= List of members of the House of Oldenburg =

Agnatic male descendants born inside legitimate marriages - both dynastic and morganatic - of Elimar I, Count of Oldenburg of the House of Oldenburg:

- Elimar I, Count of Oldenburg (1040–1108)
  - Elimar II, Count of Oldenburg (1070–1142)
    - Henry I of Oldenburg, Count of Wildeshausen (1102–1167)
      - Gerard of Oldenburg, Prince Archbishop of Bremen and Hamburg and Osnabrück († 1219)
      - Henry II, Count of Wildeshausen († 1197)
        - Henry III of Oldenburg, Count of Bruchhausen († 1234)
          - Henry V, Count of New Bruchhausen and Wildeshausen († 1270)
            - Gerhard I, Count of New Bruchhausen and Wildeshausen († 1310)
          - Burchard of Oldenburg, Canon of Verdun († 1262)
          - Ludolf, Count of Old Bruchhausen († 1278)
            - Otto, Count of Old Bruchhausen († 1298)
        - Wilbrand of Oldenburg, Prince Bishop of Utrecht and Paderborn († 1233)
        - Egilmar of Oldenburg, Canon of Münster († 1217)
        - Burchard of Oldenburg, Count of Wildeshausen († 1233)
          - Henry IV of Oldenburg, Count of Wildeshausen (1233–1271)
          - Wulbrand of Oldenburg († 1230)
          - Ludolph of Oldenburg, Canon of Utrecht († 1279)
      - Otto of Oldenburg, Prince Bishop of Münster († 1218)
    - Christian I, Count of Oldenburg († 1167)
      - Maurice, Count of Oldenburg (1145–1211)
        - Otto I, Count of Oldenburg (1175–1251)
          - Henry of Oldenburg († 1255)
        - Christian II, Count of Oldenburg (1184–1233)
          - John I, Count of Oldenburg (1204–1270)
            - Christian III, Count of Oldenburg (1234–1285)
              - John II, Count of Oldenburg (1272–1315)
                - Christian IV, Count of Oldenburg († 1334)
                - John III, Count of Oldenburg († 1344)
                  - John IV, Count of Oldenburg († 1356)
                    - Conrad of Oldenburg († 1357)
                    - Otto of Oldenburg (1356–1357)
                  - Christian of Oldenburg († 1368)
                  - Wilhelm of Oldenburg (1331–1367)
                  - Otto of Oldenburg (1331–1345)
                - Conrad I, Count of Oldenburg (1300–1347)
                  - Christian V, Count of Oldenburg (1342–1399)
                    - Christian VI, Count of Oldenburg (1394–1421)
                    - Dietrich, Count of Oldenburg (1390–1440)
                      - King Christian I of Denmark (1426–1481)
                        - Prince Olav of Denmark (1450–1451)
                        - Prince Canute of Denmark (1451–1455)
                        - King John of Denmark (1455–1513)
                          - Prince John of Denmark (1479–1480)
                          - Prince Ernest of Denmark (1480-1500)
                          - King Christian II of Denmark (1481–1559)
                            - Prince Christian of Denmark (1516)
                            - Prince John of Denmark (1518–1531)
                            - Prince Maximilian of Denmark (1519)
                            - Prince Philip Ferdinan of Denmark (1519–1520)
                          - Prince Jacob of Denmark (1484–1566)
                          - Prince Francis of Denmark (1497–1511)
                        - King Frederick I of Denmark (1471–1533)
                          - King Christian III of Denmark (1503–1559)
                            - King Frederick II of Denmark (1534–1588)
                              - King Christian IV of Denmark (1577–1648)
                                - Prince Friedrich of Denmark (1599)
                                - Prince Christian of Denmark (1603–1647)
                                - King Frederick III of Denmark (1609–1670)
                                  - King Christian V of Denmark (1646–1699)
                                    - King Frederick IV of Denmark (1671–1730)
                                      - Prince Christian of Denmark (1697–1698)
                                      - King Christian VI of Denmark (1699–1746)
                                        - King Frederick V of Denmark (1723–1766)
                                          - Prince Christian of Denmark (1745–1747)
                                          - King Christian VII of Denmark (1749–1808)
                                            - King Frederick VI of Denmark (1768–1839)
                                              - Prince Christian of Denmark (1791)
                                              - Prince Christian of Denmark (1797)
                                          - Prince Frederick of Denmark (1753–1805)
                                            - King Christian VIII of Denmark (1786–1848)
                                              - Prince Christian Friedrich of Denmark (1807)
                                              - King Frederick VII of Denmark (1808–1863)
                                            - Prince Ferdinand of Denmark (1792–1863)
                                      - Prince Frederik Charles of Denmark (1701–1702)
                                      - Prince George of Denmark (1703–1704)
                                      - Prince Frederik Christian of Denmark (1726–1727)
                                      - Prince Charles of Denmark (1728–1729)
                                    - Prince Christian William of Denmark (1672–1673)
                                    - Prince Christian of Denmark (1675–1695)
                                    - Prince Charles of Denmark (1680–1729)
                                    - Prince William of Denmark (1687–1705)
                                  - Prince Frederick of Denmark (1651–1652)
                                  - Prince George, Duke of Cumberland (1653–1708)
                                    - Prince William, Duke of Gloucester (1689–1700)
                                    - Prince George of Cumberland (1692)
                                - Prince Ulrik of Denmark, Prince Bishop of Schwerin (1611–1633)
                                - Count Valdemar Christian of Schleswig-Holstein (1622–1656)
                                - Count Friedrich Christian of Schleswig-Holstein (1625–1627)
                              - Prince Ulrik of Denmark, Prince Bishop of Schwerin and Bishop of Schleswig
                              - Prince John of Denmark (1583–1602)
                            - King Magnus of Livonia (1540–1583)
                            - John II, Duke of Schleswig-Holstein-Sonderburg (1545–1622)
                              - Christian, Duke of Schleswig-Holstein-Sonderburg-Ærø (1570–1633)
                              - Alexander, Duke of Schleswig-Holstein-Sonderburg (1573–1627)
                                - Johann Christian, Duke of Schleswig-Holstein-Sonderburg (1607–1653)
                                  - Prince Johann Friedrich of Schleswig-Holstein (1639–1649)
                                  - Christian Adolf I, Duke of Schleswig-Holstein-Sonderburg-Franzhagen (1641–1702)
                                    - Leopold Christian, Duke of Schleswig-Holstein-Sonderburg-Franzhagen (1678–1707)
                                      - Christian Ludwig of Schleswig-Holstein-Sonderburg-Franzhagen (1704)
                                      - Leopold Karl of Schleswig-Holstein-Sonderburg-Franzhagen (1705–1737)
                                      - Christian Adolf of Schleswig-Holstein-Sonderburg-Franzhagen (1706–1711)
                                    - Ludwig Karl, Duke of Schleswig-Holstein-Sonderburg-Franzhagen (1684–1708)
                                      - Christian Adolph II, Duke of Schleswig-Holstein-Sonderburg-Franzhagen (1708–1709)
                                    - Prince Johann Franz of Schleswig-Holstein-Sonderburg-Franzhagen (1685–1687)
                                - Prince Alexander Heinrich of Schleswig-Holstein-Sonderburg (1608–1667)
                                  - Ferdinand Leopold of Schleswig-Holstein-Sonderburg (1647–1702)
                                  - Alexander Rudolf of Schleswig-Holstein-Sonderburg (1651–1727)
                                  - Georg Christian of Schleswig-Holstein-Sonderburg (1653–1696)
                                  - Leopold of Schleswig-Holstein-Sonderburg (1657–1658)
                                - Ernest Günther of Schleswig-Holstein-Sonderburg-Augustenburg (1609–1689)
                                  - Frederick, Duke of Schleswig-Holstein-Sonderburg-Augustenburg (1652–1692)
                                  - Prince Philip Ernst of Schleswig-Holstein-Sonderburg-Augustenburg (1655–1677)
                                  - Ernest August, Duke of Schleswig-Holstein-Sonderburg-Augustenburg (1660–1731)
                                  - Prince Frederick William of Schleswig-Holstein-Sonderburg-Augustenburg (1668–1714)
                                    - Christian August I, Duke of Schleswig-Holstein-Sonderburg-Augustenburg (1696–1754)
                                      - Frederick Christian I, Duke of Schleswig-Holstein-Sonderburg-Augustenburg (1721–1794)
                                        - Frederick Christian II, Duke of Schleswig-Holstein-Sonderburg-Augustenburg (1765–1814)
                                          - Christian August II, Duke of Schleswig-Holstein-Sonderburg-Augustenburg (1798–1869)
                                            - Prince Alexander Friedrich Georg of Schleswig-Holstein-Sonderburg-Augustenburg (1821–1823)
                                            - Frederick VIII, Duke of Schleswig-Holstein (1829–1880)
                                              - Prince Friedrich of Schleswig-Holstein (1857–1858)
                                              - Prince Gerhard of Schleswig-Holstein (1862)
                                              - Ernst Gunther, Duke of Schleswig-Holstein (1863–1921)
                                            - Prince Christian of Schleswig-Holstein (1831–1917)
                                              - Prince Christian Victor of Schleswig-Holstein (1867–1900)
                                              - Albert, Duke of Schleswig-Holstein (1869–1931)
                                              - Prince Frederick Harald of Schleswig-Holstein (1876)
                                          - Prince Friedrich Emil August of Noer (1800–1865)
                                            - Count Friedrich Christian Karl August of Noer (1830–1881)
                                            - Count Christian Emil August of Noer (1832–1834)
                                        - Prince Friedrich Karl Emil of Schleswig-Holstein-Sonderburg-Augustenburg (1767–1841)
                                          - Prince Friedrich August Emil of Schleswig-Holstein-Sonderburg-Augustenburg (1802–1843)
                                          - Prince Georg Erich of Schleswig-Holstein-Sonderburg-Augustenburg (1805–1849)
                                          - Prince August of Schleswig-Holstein-Sonderburg-Augustenburg (1805–1807)
                                          - Prince Julius of Schleswig-Holstein-Sonderburg-Augustenburg (1807)
                                          - Prince Heinrich Karl Woldemar of Schleswig-Holstein-Sonderburg-Augustenburg (1810–1871)
                                        - Charles August, Crown Prince of Sweden (1768–1810)
                                        - Prince Karl Wilhelm of Schleswig-Holstein-Sonderburg-Augustenburg (1770–1771)
                                      - Prince Emil August of Schleswig-Holstein-Sonderburg-Augustenburg (1722–1786)
                                      - Prince Christian Ulrich of Schleswig-Holstein-Sonderburg-Augustenburg (1723)
                                    - Prince Friedrich Karl of Schleswig-Holstein-Sonderburg-Augustenburg (1701–1702)
                                - Prince Georg Friedrich of Schleswig-Holstein-Sonderburg (1611–1676)
                                - August Philipp, Duke of Schleswig-Holstein-Sonderburg-Beck (1612–1675)
                                  - August, Duke of Schleswig-Holstein-Sonderburg-Beck (1652–1689)
                                    - Frederick William I, Duke of Schleswig-Holstein-Sonderburg-Beck (1682-1719)
                                  - Frederick Louis, Duke of Schleswig-Holstein-Sonderburg-Beck(1653–1728)
                                    - Frederick William II, Duke of Schleswig-Holstein-Sonderburg-Beck (1687-1749)
                                      - Frederick William III, Duke of Schleswig-Holstein-Sonderburg-Beck (1723–1757)
                                    - Prince Frederick Louis of Schleswig-Holstein-Sonderburg-Beck (1688)
                                    - Charles Louis, Duke of Schleswig-Holstein-Sonderburg-Beck (1690-1774)
                                      - Duke Karl Frederick of Schleswig-Holstein-Sonderburg-Beck (1732-1772)
                                    - Prince Philip William of Schleswig-Holstein-Sonderburg-Beck (1693-1729)
                                    - Peter August, Duke of Schleswig-Holstein-Sonderburg-Beck (1697–1775)
                                      - Prince Karl of Schleswig-Holstein-Sonderburg-Beck (1724–1726)
                                      - Prince Karl Anton August of Schleswig-Holstein-Sonderburg-Beck (1727–1759)
                                        - Friedrich Karl Ludwig, Duke of Schleswig-Holstein-Sonderburg-Beck (1757–1816)
                                          - Friedrich Wilhelm, Duke of Schleswig-Holstein-Sonderburg-Beck-Glücksburg (1785–1831)
                                            - Karl, Duke of Schleswig-Holstein-Sonderburg-Glücksburg (1813–1878)
                                            - Friedrich, Duke of Schleswig-Holstein-Sonderburg-Glücksburg (1814–1885)
                                              - Frederick Ferdinand, Duke of Schleswig-Holstein (1855–1934)
                                                - William Frederick, Duke of Schleswig-Holstein (1891–1965)
                                                  - John Albert, Duke of Schleswig-Holstein (1917–1944)
                                                  - Prince William Alfred of Schleswig-Holstein (1919–1926)
                                                  - Peter, Duke of Schleswig-Holstein (1922–1980)
                                                    - Christoph, Duke of Schleswig-Holstein (1949–2023)
                                                      - Friedrich Ferdinand, Duke of Schleswig-Holstein (b. 1985)
                                                        - Prince Alfred of Schleswig-Holstein (b. 2019)
                                                        - Prince Albert of Schleswig-Holstein (b. 2020)
                                                      - Prince Constantin of Schleswig-Holstein (b. 1986)
                                                        - Prince Tassilo of Schleswig-Holstein (b. 2023)
                                                      - Prince Leopold of Schleswig-Holstein (b. 1991)
                                                    - Prince Alexander of Schleswig-Holstein (b. 1953)
                                                      - Prince Julian of Schleswig-Holstein (b. 1997)
                                              - Prince Albrecht of Schleswig-Holstein-Sonderburg-Glücksburg (1863–1948)
                                                - Prince Friedrich Wilhelm of Schleswig-Holstein-Sonderburg-Glücksburg (1909–1940)
                                                - Prince Johann Georg of Schleswig-Holstein-Sonderburg-Glücksburg (1911–1941)
                                                - Prince Friedrich Ferdinand of Schleswig-Holstein-Sonderburg-Glücksburg (1913–1989)
                                            - Prince Wilhelm of Schleswig-Holstein-Sonderburg-Glücksburg (1816–1893)
                                            - King Christian IX of Denmark (1818–1906)
                                              - King Frederik VIII of Denmark (1843–1912)
                                                - King Christian X of Denmark (1870–1947)
                                                  - King Frederik IX of Denmark (1899–1972)
                                                  - Knud, Hereditary Prince of Denmark (1900–1976)
                                                    - Count Ingolf of Rosenborg (b. 1940)
                                                    - Count Christian of Rosenborg (1942–2013)
                                                - King Haakon VII of Norway (1872–1957)
                                                  - King Olav V of Norway (1903–1991)
                                                    - King Harald V of Norway (b. 1937)
                                                      - Haakon, Crown Prince of Norway (b. 1973)
                                                        - Prince Sverre Magnus of Norway (b. 2005)
                                                - Prince Harald of Denmark (1876–1949)
                                                  - Prince Gorm of Denmark (1919–1991)
                                                  - Count Oluf of Rosenborg (1923–1990)
                                                    - Count Ulrik Harald Gunnar Oluf of Rosenborg (b. 1950)
                                                      - Count Philip Oluf Axel Ulrik of Rosenborg (b. 1986)
                                                - Prince Gustav of Denmark (1887–1944)
                                              - King George I of Greece (1845–1913)
                                                - King Constantine I of Greece (1868–1923)
                                                  - King George II of Greece (1890–1947)
                                                  - King Alexander I of Greece (1893–1920)
                                                  - King Paul I of Greece (1901–1964)
                                                    - King Constantine II of Greece (b. 1940)
                                                      - Pavlos, Crown Prince of Greece (b. 1967)
                                                        - Prince Constantine Alexios of Greece and Denmark (b. 1998)
                                                        - Prince Achileas-Andreas of Greece and Denmark (b. 2000)
                                                        - Prince Odysseas-Kimon of Greece and Denmark (b. 2004)
                                                        - Prince Aristide Stavros of Greece and Denmark (b. 2008)
                                                      - Prince Nikolaos of Greece and Denmark (b. 1969)
                                                      - Prince Philippos of Greece and Denmark (b. 1986)
                                                - Prince George of Greece and Denmark (1869–1957)
                                                  - Prince Peter of Greece and Denmark (1908–1980)
                                                - Prince Nicholas of Greece and Denmark (1872–1938)
                                                - Prince Andrew of Greece and Denmark (1882–1944)
                                                  - Prince Philip, Duke of Edinburgh (1921–2021)
                                                    - King Charles III (b. 1948)
                                                      - William, Prince of Wales (b. 1982)
                                                        - Prince George of Wales (b. 2013)
                                                        - Prince Louis of Wales (b. 2018)
                                                      - Prince Harry, Duke of Sussex (b. 1984)
                                                        - Prince Archie of Sussex (b. 2019)
                                                    - Andrew Mountbatten-Windsor (b. 1960)
                                                    - Prince Edward, Duke of Edinburgh (b. 1964)
                                                      - Prince James of Edinburgh (b. 2007)
                                                - Prince Christopher of Greece and Denmark (1888–1940)
                                                  - Prince Michael of Greece and Denmark (b. 1939)
                                              - Prince Valdemar of Denmark (1858–1939)
                                                - Prince Aage, Count of Rosenborg (1887–1940)
                                                  - Count Valdemar of Rosenborg (1915–1995)
                                                - Prince Axel of Denmark (1888–1964)
                                                  - Prince Georg of Denmark (1920–1986)
                                                  - Count Flemming of Rosenborg (1922–2002)
                                                    - Count Axel of Rosenborg (b. 1950)
                                                      - Count Carl Johan of Rosenborg (b. 1979)
                                                        - Count Valdemar of Rosenborg (b. 2014)
                                                      - Count Alexander Flemming of Rosenborg (b. 1993)
                                                    - Count Birger of Rosenborg (b. 1950)
                                                    - Count Carl Johan of Rosenborg (b. 1952)
                                                - Prince Erik, Count of Rosenborg (1890–1950)
                                                  - Count Christian Edward of Rosenborg (1932–1997)
                                                    - Count Valdemar Christian of Rosenborg (b. 1965)
                                                      - Count Nicolai Christian Valdemar of Rosenborg (b. 1997)
                                                - Prince Viggo, Count of Rosenborg (1893–1970)
                                            - Prince Julius of Schleswig-Holstein-Sonderburg-Glücksburg (1824–1903)
                                            - Prince Johann of Schleswig-Holstein-Sonderburg-Glücksburg (1825–1911)
                                            - Prince Nikolaus of Schleswig-Holstein-Sonderburg-Glücksburg (1828–1849)
                                      - Prince Peter of Schleswig-Holstein-Sonderburg-Beck (1743–1751)
                                      - Prince Alexander of Schleswig-Holstein-Sonderburg-Beck (1744)
                                    - Prince Maximilian Wilhelm of Schleswig-Holstein-Sonderburg-Beck (1664–1692)
                                    - Prince Anton Günther of Schleswig-Holstein-Sonderburg-Beck (1666–1744)
                                    - Prince Ernst Kasimir of Schleswig-Holstein-Sonderburg-Beck (1668–1695)
                                    - Prince Karl Gustav of Schleswig-Holstein-Sonderburg-Beck (1672)
                                - Prince Adolf of Schleswig-Holstein-Sonderburg (1613–1616)
                                - Prince Wilhelm Anton of Schleswig-Holstein-Sonderburg (1616)
                                - Philip Louis, Duke of Schleswig-Holstein-Sonderburg-Wiesenburg (1620-1689)
                                  - Friedrich, Duke of Schleswig-Holstein-Sonderburg-Wiesenburg (1651–1724)
                                    - Leopold, Duke of Schleswig-Holstein-Sonderburg-Wiesenburg (1674–1744)
                                  - Prince Georg Wilhelm of Schleswig-Holstein-Sonderburg-Wiesenburg(1652)
                                  - Prince Karl Ludwig of Schleswig-Holstein-Sonderburg-Wiesenburg(1654–1690)
                                  - Prince Johann Georg of Schleswig-Holstein-Sonderburg-Wiesenburg(1658)
                                  - Prince Leopold Georg of Schleswig-Holstein-Sonderburg-Wiesenburg(1660)
                                  - Prince Wilhelm Christian of Schleswig-Holstein-Sonderburg-Wiesenburg(1661–1711)
                              - Prince August of Schleswig-Holstein-Sonderburg (1574–1596)
                              - John Adolph, Duke of Schleswig-Holstein-Sønderburg-Norburg (1576–1624)
                              - Frederick, Duke of Schleswig-Holstein-Sønderburg-Norburg (1581–1658)
                                - Johann Bogislaw, Duke of Schleswig-Holstein-Norburg (1629–1679)
                                - Prince Christian August of Schleswig-Holstein-Sonderburg-Norburg (1639–1687)
                                - Prince Rudolf Friedrich of Schleswig-Holstein-Sonderburg-Norburg (1645–1688)
                                  - Prince Karl of Schleswig-Holstein-Sonderburg-Norburg (1681–1682)
                                - Prince Ernst Leopold von Schleswig-Holstein-Sonderburg-Norburg (1685–1722)
                              - Philip, Duke of Schleswig-Holstein-Sonderburg-Glücksburg
                                - Prince Johann of Schleswig-Holstein-Glücksburg (1625-1640)
                                - Prince Franz of Schleswig-Holstein-Glücksburg (1626-1651)
                                - Christian, Duke of Schleswig-Holstein-Glücksburg (1627-1698)
                                  - Prince Friedrich August of Schleswig-Holstein-Glücksburg (1664)
                                  - Philipp Ernst, Duke of Schleswig-Holstein-Glücksburg (1673-1729)
                                    - Friedrich, Duke of Schleswig-Holstein-Sonderburg-Glücksburg (1701–1766)
                                      - Friedrich Heinrich Wilhelm, Duke of Schleswig-Holstein-Sonderburg-Glücksburg (1747–1779)
                                      - Prince Simon Ludwig of Schleswig-Holstein-Glücksburg (1756–1760)
                                    - Prince Christian Philip of Schleswig-Holstein-Glücksburg (1702–1703)
                                    - Prince Karl Ernst of Schleswig-Holstein-Glücksburg (1706–1761)
                                    - Prince Christian Ernst of Schleswig-Holstein-Glücksburg (1724–1726)
                                - Prince Karl Albrecht of Schleswig-Holstein-Glücksburg (1629-1631)
                                - Prince Adolf of Schleswig-Holstein-Glücksburg (1631-1658)
                              - Prince Albrecht of Schleswig-Holstein-Sonderburg (1585–1613)
                              - Prince Johann Georg of Schleswig-Holstein-Sonderburg (1594–1613)
                              - Joachim Ernst, Duke of Schleswig-Holstein-Sonderburg-Plön (1595–1671)
                                - Johann Adolf, Duke of Schleswig-Holstein-Sonderburg-Plön (1634–1704)
                                  - Adolf August, Duke of Schleswig-Holstein-Sonderburg-Plön (1680–1704)
                                    - Leopold August, Duke of Schleswig-Holstein-Sonderburg-Plön (1702–1706)
                                  - Prince Joachim Ernst of Schleswig-Holstein-Sonderburg-Plön (1681–1682)
                                  - Prince Johann Ulrich of Schleswig-Holstein-Sonderburg-Plön (1684)
                                  - Prince Christian Karl of Schleswig-Holstein-Sonderburg-Plön (1690–1704)
                                - Prince August of Schleswig-Holstein-Sonderburg-Plön (1635–1699)
                                  - Joachim Friedrich, Duke of Schleswig-Holstein-Sonderburg-Plön (1668–1722)
                                  - Prince Christian Charles of Schleswig-Holstein-Sonderburg-Plön-Norburg (1674–1706)
                                    - Friedrich Karl, Duke of Schleswig-Holstein-Sonderburg-Plön (1706–1761)
                                      - Prince Christian Karl of Schleswig-Holstein-Sonderburg-Plön (1738–1740)
                                - Prince Joachim Ernst of Schleswig-Holstein-Sonderburg-Plön (1637–1700)
                                  - Prince Jakob August Renatus of Schleswig-Holstein-Sonderburg-Plön (1682)
                                  - Prince Johann Ernst Ferdinand of Schleswig-Holstein-Sonderburg-Plön (1684–1729)
                                - Prince Bernhard of Schleswig-Holstein-Sonderburg-Plön (1639–1676)
                                - Prince Karl Heinrich of Schleswig-Holstein-Sonderburg-Plön (1642–1655)
                              - Prince Bernhard of Schleswig-Holstein-Sonderburg (1601)
                          - John II, Duke of Schleswig-Holstein-Haderslev (1521–1580)
                          - Adolf, Duke of Schleswig-Holstein-Gottorp (1526–1586)
                            - Frederick II, Duke of Schleswig-Holstein-Gottorp (1568–1587)
                            - Philip, Duke of Schleswig-Holstein-Gottorp (1570–1590)
                            - John Adolf, Duke of Schleswig-Holstein-Gottorp (1575–1616)
                              - Frederick III, Duke of Schleswig-Holstein-Gottorp (1597–1659)
                                - Prince Johann Adolf of Schleswig-Holstein-Gottorp (1632–1633)
                                - Prince Friedrich of Schleswig-Holstein-Gottorp (1635–1654)
                                - Prince Adolf Gustav of Schleswig-Holstein-Gottorp (1637)
                                - Prince Johann Georg of Schleswig-Holstein-Gottorp, Prince Bishop of Lübeck (1638–1655)
                                - Christian Albert, Duke of Schleswig-Holstein-Gottorp (1641–1695)
                                  - Frederick IV, Duke of Schleswig-Holstein-Gottorp (1671–1702)
                                    - Charles Frederick, Duke of Schleswig-Holstein-Gottorp (1700–1739)
                                      - Emperor Peter III of Russia (1728–1762)
                                        - Emperor Paul I of Russia (1754–1801)
                                          - Emperor Alexander I of Russia (1777–1825)
                                          - Grand Duke Konstantin Pavlovich of Russia (1779–1831)
                                          - Emperor Nicholas I of Russia (1796-1855)
                                            - Emperor Alexander II of Russia (1818-1881)
                                              - Grand Duke Nicholas Alexandrovich of Russia (1843-1865)
                                              - Emperor Alexander III of Russia (1845-1894)
                                                - Emperor Nicholas II of Russia (1868-1918)
                                                  - Grand Duke Alexei Nikolaevich of Russia (1904-1918)
                                                - Grand Duke Alexander Alexandrovich of Russia (1869-1870)
                                                - Grand Duke George Alexandrovich of Russia (1871-1899)
                                                - Grand Duke Michael Alexandrovich of Russia (1878-1918)
                                                  - George Mikhailovich, Count Brasov (1910-1931)
                                              - Grand Duke Vladimir Alexandrovich of Russia (1847–1909)
                                                - Grand Duke Alexander Vladimirovich of Russia (1875-1877)
                                                - Grand Duke Cyril Vladimirovich of Russia (1876-1938)
                                                  - Grand Duke Vladimir Kirillovich of Russia (1917-1992)
                                                - Grand Duke Boris Vladimirovich of Russia (1877-1943)
                                                - Grand Duke Andrei Vladimirovich of Russia (1879-1956)
                                                  - Prince Vladimir Romanovsky-Krasinsky (1902-1974)
                                              - Grand Duke Alexei Alexandrovich of Russia (1850–1908)
                                                - Count Alexei Alexeevich Belevsky-Zhukovsky (1871-1931)
                                                  - Count Sergei Alexeevich Belevsky-Zhukovsky (1903-1956)
                                              - Grand Duke Sergei Alexandrovich of Russia (1857-1905)
                                              - Grand Duke Paul Alexandrovich of Russia (1860-1919)
                                                - Grand Duke Dmitri Pavlovich of Russia (1891-1941)
                                                  - Prince Paul Dimitrievich Romanovsky-Ilyinsky (1928-2004)
                                                    - Prince Dimitri Pavlovich Romanovsky-Ilyinsky (b. 1954)
                                                    - Prince Michael Pavlovich Romanovsky-Ilyinsky (b. 1961)
                                                - Prince Vladimir Pavlovich Paley (1897-1918)
                                              - Prince George Alexandrovich Yurievsky (1872-1913)
                                                - Prince Alexander Georgijevich Yurievsky (1900-1988)
                                                  - Prince George Alexandrovich Yurievsky (b. 1961)
                                              - Prince Boris Alexandrovich Yurievsky (1876)
                                            - Grand Duke Konstantin Nikolayevich of Russia (1827-1892)
                                              - Grand Duke Nikolai Konstantinovich of Russia (1850-1918)
                                                - Prince Artemy Nikolaevich Romanovsky-Iskander (1883-1919)
                                                - Prince Alexander Nikolaevich Romanovsky-Iskander (1889-1957)
                                                  - Prince Kyrill Alexandrovich Romanovsky-Iskander (1915-1992)
                                              - Grand Duke Konstantin Konstantinovich of Russia (1858-1915)
                                                - Prince John Konstantinovich of Russia (1886-1918)
                                                  - Prince Vsevolod Ivanovich of Russia (1914-1973)
                                                - Prince Gabriel Constantinovich of Russia (1887-1955)
                                                - Prince Constantine Constantinovich of Russia (1891-1918)
                                                - Prince Oleg Konstantinovich of Russia (1892-1914)
                                                - Prince Igor Konstantinovich of Russia (1894-1918)
                                                - Prince George Konstantinovich of Russia (1903-1938)
                                              - Grand Duke Dimitri Konstantinovich of Russia (1860-1919)
                                              - Grand Duke Vyacheslav Konstantinovich of Russia (1862-1879)
                                            - Grand Duke Nicholas Nikolaevich of Russia (1831–1891)
                                              - Grand Duke Nicholas Nikolaevich of Russia (1856-1929)
                                              - Grand Duke Peter Nikolaevich of Russia (1864-1931)
                                                - Prince Roman Petrovich of Russia (1896-1978)
                                                  - Prince Nicholas Romanovich (1922-2014)
                                                  - Prince Dimitri Romanov (1926-2016)
                                            - Grand Duke Michael Nicolaevich of Russia (1832-1909)
                                              - Grand Duke Nicholas Mikhailovich of Russia (1859–1919)
                                              - Grand Duke Michael Mikhailovich of Russia (1861–1929)
                                                - Count Michael de Torby (1898-1959)
                                              - Grand Duke George Mikhailovich of Russia (1863–1919)
                                              - Grand Duke Alexander Mikhailovich of Russia (1866-1933)
                                                - Prince Andrew Alexandrovich of Russia (1897-1981)
                                                  - Prince Michael Andreevich (1920-2008)
                                                  - Prince Andrew Andreevich (1923-2021)
                                                    - Prince Alexis Andreevich (b. 1953)
                                                    - Prince Peter Andreevich (b. 1961)
                                                    - Prince Andrew Andreevich (b. 1963)
                                                - Prince Feodor Alexandrovich of Russia (1898–1968)
                                                  - Prince Michael Feodorovich (1924-2008)
                                                    - Prince Michael Mikhailovich (1959-2001)
                                                - Prince Nikita Alexandrovich of Russia (1900–1974)
                                                  - Prince Nikita Nikitich (1923-2007)
                                                    - Prince Feodor Nikitich (1974-2007)
                                                  - Prince Alexander Nikitich (1929-2002)
                                                - Prince Dmitri Alexandrovich (1901-1980)
                                                - Prince Rostislav Alexandrovich of Russia (1902-1978)
                                                  - Prince Rostislav Rostislavovich (1938-1999)
                                                    - Prince Rostislav Rostislavovich (b. 1985)
                                                      - Prince Rostislav Rostislavovich (b. 2013)
                                                      - Prince Mikhail Rostislavovich (b. 2015)
                                                    - Prince Nikita Rostislavovich (b. 1987)
                                                  - Prince Nicholas Rostislavovich (1945-2000)
                                                    - Prince Nicholas Nicolaevich (b. 1968)
                                                      - Prince Cory Nicolaevich (1994-1998)
                                                    - Prince Daniel Nicolaevich (b. 1972)
                                                      - Prince Jackson Daniel Danielaevich (b. 2009)
                                                - Prince Vasili Alexandrovich of Russia (1907–1989)
                                              - Grand Duke Sergei Mikhailovich of Russia (1869–1918)
                                              - Grand Duke Alexei Mikhailovich of Russia (1875–1895)
                                          - Grand Duke Michael Pavlovich of Russia (1798–1849)
                                  - Prince Christian August of Schleswig-Holstein-Gottorp (1673-1726)
                                    - Charles Augustus of Schleswig-Holstein-Gottorp, Prince Bishop of Lübeck (1706–1727)
                                    - King Adolf Frederick of Sweden (1710-1771)
                                      - King Gustav III of Sweden (1746–1792)
                                        - King Gustav IV Adolf of Sweden (1778–1837)
                                          - Prince Gustav of Sweden (1799–1877)
                                        - Prince Charles Gustav, Duke of Småland (1782–1783)
                                      - King Charles XIII of Sweden (1748–1818)
                                        - Charles Adolf, Duke of Värmland (1798)
                                      - Prince Frederick Adolf, Duke of Östergötland (1750–1803)
                                    - Frederick Augustus I, Duke of Oldenburg (1711–1785)
                                      - William, Duke of Oldenburg (1754–1823)
                                    - Prince William Christian of Schleswig-Holstein-Gottorp (1716–1719)
                                    - Prince Frederick Conrad of Schleswig-Holstein-Gottorp (1718)
                                    - Prince George Ludwig of Schleswig-Holstein-Gottorp (1719-1763)
                                      - Prince Frederick of Schleswig-Holstein-Gottorp (1751-1752)
                                      - Prince William of Schleswig-Holstein-Gottorp (1753-1772)
                                      - Peter I, Grand Duke of Oldenburg (1755-1829)
                                        - Augustus, Grand Duke of Oldenburg (1783-1853)
                                          - Peter II, Grand Duke of Oldenburg (1827-1900)
                                            - Frederick Augustus II, Grand Duke of Oldenburg (1852-1931)
                                              - Nikolaus, Duke of Oldenburg (1897-1970)
                                                - Anton Günther, Duke of Oldenburg (1923-2014)
                                                  - Christian, Duke of Oldenburg (b. 1955)
                                                    - Prince Alexander of Oldenburg (b. 1990)
                                                    - Prince Philipp of Oldenburg (b. 1991)
                                                    - Prince Anton Friedrich of Oldenburg (b. 1993)
                                                - Prince Peter Friedrich of Oldenburg (1926-2016)
                                                  - Prince Friedrich August of Oldenburg (b. 1952)
                                                  - Prince Nikolaus of Oldenburg (b. 1955)
                                                    - Prince Christoph of Oldenburg (b. 1985)
                                                    - Prince Georg of Oldenburg (b. 1990)
                                                    - Prince Oscar of Oldenburg (b. 1991)
                                                  - Prince Georg Moritz of Oldenburg (b. 1957)
                                                - Prince Egilmar Friedrich of Oldenburg (1934-2013)
                                                - Prince Friedrich August of Oldenburg (1936–2017)
                                                  - Prince Paul-Wladimir of Oldenburg (b. 1969)
                                                    - Prince Kirill of Oldenburg (b. 2002)
                                                    - Prince Carlos of Oldenburg (b. 2004)
                                                    - Prince Paul of Oldenburg (b. 2005)
                                                    - Prince Louis of Oldenburg (b. 2012)
                                                - Prince Huno of Oldenburg (b. 1940)
                                                - Prince Johann of Oldenburg (b. 1940)
                                                  - Prince Konstantin Nikolaus of Oldenburg (b. 1975)
                                              - Prince Frederick Augustus of Oldenburg (1917)
                                            - Prince George Ludwig of Oldenburg (1855–1939)
                                          - Prince Alexander Frederick of Oldenburg (1834–1835)
                                          - Prince August Nicholas of Oldenburg (1836–1837)
                                          - Prince Elimar Anthony of Oldenburg (1844–1895)
                                            - Count Gustav Gregor Alexander of Welsburg (1878–1927)
                                              - Count Georg Elimar Albrecht of Welsburg (1906–1984)
                                                - Count Alexander Thankmar Paul of Welsburg (b. 1938)
                                                - Count Christian Alosius Percy of Welsburg (b. 1939)
                                              - Count Alexander Anton Gustav of Welsburg (1908–1945)
                                              - Count Percy Friedrich of Welsburg (1913–1994)
                                                - Count Patrick Hubert of Welsburg (b. 1943)
                                        - Prince George of Oldenburg (1784–1812)
                                          - Prince Peter Paul Alexander of Oldenburg (1810–1829)
                                          - Prince Peter Constantine Frederick of Oldenburg (1812–1881)
                                            - Prince Nicholas of Oldenburg (1840–1886)
                                            - Prince Alexander of Oldenburg (1844–1932)
                                              - Prince Peter of Oldenburg (1868–1924)
                                            - Prince George of Oldenburg (1848–1871)
                                            - Prince Constantine of Oldenburg (1850–1906)
                                              - Count Nikolai Konstantinovich of Zarnekau (1886–1976)
                                              - Count Aleksai Konstantinovich of Zarnekau (1887–1918)
                                              - Count Petr Konstantinovich of Zarnekau (1889–1961)
                                                - Count Konstantin Petrovich of Zarnekau (1916–1977)
                                                  - Count Petr Konstantinovich of Zarnekau (b. 1948)
                                                    - Count Nikolai Petrovich of Zarnekau (b. 1968)
                                - Prince Gustav Ulrich of Schleswig-Holstein-Gottorp (1642–1642)
                                - Prince August Friedrich of Schleswig-Holstein-Gottorp, Prince Bishop of Lübeck (1646–1705)
                                - Prince Adolf of Schleswig-Holstein-Gottorp (1647)
                              - Prince Adolf of Schleswig-Holstein-Gottorp (1600–1631)
                              - Prince John of Schleswig-Holstein-Gottorp, Prince Bishop of Lübeck (1606–1655)
                                - Prince Julius Adolf Friedrich of Schleswig-Holstein-Gottorp (1643–1644)
                                - Prince Johann Julius Friedrich of Schleswig-Holstein-Gottorp (1646–1647)
                                - Prince Johann August of Schleswig-Holstein-Gottorp (1647–1686)
                              - Prince Christian of Schleswig-Holstein-Gottorp (1609)
                            - Prince John Frederick of Schleswig-Holstein-Gottorp, Prince Archbishop of Bremen and Prince Bishop of Lübeck and Verden (1579-1634)
                          - Prince Frederick of Denmark, Prince Archbishop of Hildesheim and Bishop of Schleswig (1529-1556)
                      - Maurice III, Count of Oldenburg–Delmenhorst (1428–1464)
                        - Jakob, Count of Oldenburg–Delmenhorst (1463–1483)
                      - Gerhard VI, Count of Oldenburg (1428–1464)
                        - Gerhard of Oldenburg (1454–1470)
                        - Dietrich of Oldenburg (1456–1463)
                        - Adolph, Count of Oldenburg-Delmenhorst (1458–1500)
                        - Christian of Oldenburg (1459–1492)
                        - John V, Count of Oldenburg (1460–1526)
                          - John VI, Count of Oldenburg (1501–1548)
                          - George, Count of Oldenburg (1503–1551)
                          - Christopher, Count of Oldenburg, Canon of Bremen and Cologne (1504–1566)
                          - Anthony I, Count of Oldenburg (1505–1573
                            - John VII, Count of Oldenburg (1540–1603)
                              - Johann Friedrich of Oldenburg (1578–1580)
                              - Anthony Günther, Count of Oldenburg (1583–1667)
                            - Christian, Canon of Cologne (1544–1570)
                            - Anthony II, Count of Oldenburg-Delmenhorst (1550–1619)
                              - Anthony Henry, Count of Oldenburg-Delmenhorst (1604–1622)
                              - Christian IX, Count of Oldenburg-Delmenhorst (1612–1647)
                          - Maurice of Oldenburg
                        - Otto of Oldenburg, Canon of Bremen and Cologne (1464–1500)
                - Conrad II, Count of Oldenburg (1342–1401)
                  - Johann of Oldenburg († 1393)
                  - Maurice II, Count of Oldenburg (1381–1420)
              - Christian of Oldenburg († 1314)
              - Otto of Oldenburg, Prince Archbishop of Bremen (1286–1348)
            - Maurice of Oldenburg († 1319)
            - Otto II, Count of Oldenburg–Delmenhorst (1250–1304)
              - Johann I, Count of Oldenburg–Delmenhorst (1294–1347)
                - Christian, Count of Oldenburg–Delmenhorst (1335–1367)
                  - Otto IV, Count of Oldenburg–Delmenhorst (1367–1418)
                    - Nicholas, Count of Oldenburg–Delmenhorst, Prince Archbishop of Bremen († 1217)
                  - Johann of Oldenburg–Delmenhorst († 1354)
                - Bernhard of Oldenburg-Delmenhorst, Canon of Hildesheim
                - Johann of Oldenburg-Delmenhorst, Canon of Minden
              - Christian I, Count of Oldenburg–Delmenhorst (1294–1355)
                - Otto III, Count of Oldenburg–Delmenhorst (1337–1374)
                - Wertslaw of Oldenburg–Delmenhorst, Canon of Verden († 1379)
                - Johann of Oldenburg–Delmenhorst, Canon of Cologne
                - Christian of Oldenburg–Delmenhorst, Canon of Bremen
          - Otto of Oldenburg, Abbot of St. Paul in Bremen (1204–1285)
      - Christian of Oldenburg († 1192)
    - Otto of Oldenburg (1130–1184)

Family tree focused on agnatic male descendants born out of wedlock, therefore legitimized or illegitimate, of Elimar I, Count of Oldenburg:

- Elimar I, Count of Oldenburg (1040–1108)
  - Elimar II, Count of Oldenburg (1070–1142)
    - Christian I, Count of Oldenburg († 1167)
      - Maurice, Count of Oldenburg (1145–1211)
        - Christian II, Count of Oldenburg (1184–1233)
          - John I, Count of Oldenburg (1204–1270)
            - Christian III, Count of Oldenburg (1234–1285)
              - John II, Count of Oldenburg (1272–1315)
                - Conrad I, Count of Oldenburg (1300–1347)
                  - Christian V, Count of Oldenburg (1342–1399)
                    - Dietrich, Count of Oldenburg (1390–1440)
                      - King Christian I of Denmark (1426–1481)
                        - King Frederick I of Denmark (1471–1533)
                          - King Christian III of Denmark (1503–1559)
                            - King Frederick II of Denmark (1534–1588)
                              - King Christian IV of Denmark (1577–1648)
                                - King Frederick III of Denmark (1577–1648)
                                  - Ulrik Frederik Gyldenløve, Count of Løvendal (1638–1704)
                                    - Count Carl Danneskiold-Løvendal (1660-1689)
                                    - Count Woldemar Danneskiold-Løvendal (1660–1740)
                                      - Count Ulrich Friedrich Danneskiold-Løvendal (1694–1754)
                                      - Count Ulrich Friedrich Woldemar Danneskiold-Løvendal (1700–1755)
                                        - Count Woldemar Henrik Danneskiold-Løvendal (1723-1724)
                                        - Count Frederik Woldemar Danneskiold-Løvendal (1724-1740)
                                        - Count Franz Xaver Danneskiold-Løvendal (1742–1808)
                                          - Count Carl Woldemar Danneskiold-Løvendal (1773–1829)
                                    - Count Ulrik Frederik Danneskiold-Laurvig (1678)
                                    - Count Christian Anton Danneskiold-Laurvig (1679-1679)
                                    - Count Frederik Christian Danneskiold-Laurvig (1681-1696)
                                    - Ferdinand Anton Gyldenløve, Count of Laurvig (1688–1754)
                                      - Count Frederik Ludwig Danneskiold-Laurvig (1717–1762)
                                        - Count Christian Frederik Danneskiold-Laurvig (1717–1762)
                                      - Count Ulrich Ferdinand Danneskiold-Laurvig (1720)
                                      - Count Christian Conrad Danneskiold-Laurvig (1723–1783)
                                  - King Christian V of Denmark (1646–1699)
                                    - King Frederick IV of Denmark (1646–1699)
                                      - King Christian VI of Denmark (1646–1699)
                                        - King Frederick V of Denmark (1723–1766)
                                          - Ulrik Frederik de Hansen (1751–1752)
                                      - Frederik Gyldenløve (1704–1705)
                                    - Christian Gyldenløve, Count of Samsøe (1674–1703)
                                      - Count Christian Danneskiold-Samsøe (1702-1728)
                                        - Count Frederik Christian Danneskiold-Samsøe (1722-1778)
                                          - Count Christian Conrad Danneskiold-Samsøe (1774-1823)
                                            - Count Frederik Christian Danneskiold-Samsøe (1798-1869)
                                            - Count Christian Conrad Sophus Danneskiold-Samsøe (1800-1886)
                                              - Count Christian Danneskiold-Samsøe (1838-1914)
                                                - Count Christian Emil Robert Danneskiold-Samsøe (1884-1886)
                                                - Count Aage Conrad Danneskiold-Samsøe (1886-1945)
                                              - Count Christian Ernest Danneskiold-Samsøe (1840-1908)
                                            - Count Magnus Otto Sophus Danneskiold-Samsøe (1804-1894)
                                              - Count Christian Conrad Sophus Danneskiold-Samsøe (1836-1908)
                                                - Count Christian Valdemar Danneskiold-Samsøe (1864-1931)
                                                  - Count James Christian Carl Sophus Danneskiold-Samsøe (1900-1966)
                                                    - Count Valdemar Dale Danneskiold-Samsøe (1935-2016)
                                                      - Count Mikkel Archibald Valdemar Christian Danneskiold-Samsøe (b. 1971)
                                                      - Count Frederik Valdemar Mikkel Hannibal Danneskiold-Samsøe (b. 1985)
                                                      - Count Christian Valdemar Gustav Mikkel Danneskiold-Samsøe (b. 1987)
                                                      - Count Kevin Christopher Christian Mikkel Danneskiold-Samsøe (b. 1990)
                                                      - Count Sofus Charles Valdemar Mikkel Danneskiold-Samsøe (b. 1992)
                                                      - Count Oliver James Mikkel Alexander Danneskiold-Samsøe (2000-2016)
                                                - Count Viggo Danneskiold-Samsøe (1874-1936)
                                                  - Count Knud Danneskiold-Samsøe (1900-1969)
                                                  - Count Hans Christian Erik Viggo Danneskiold-Samsøe (1915-1975)
                                                    - Count Carl Christian Erik Leopold Danneskiold-Samsøe (b. 1945)
                                                    - Count Frederik Jost Conrad Erling Danneskiold-Samsøe (b. 1946)
                                                    - Count Christian Jürg Heinrich Caspar Danneskiold-Samsøe (b. 1951)
                                                    - Count Kaj Ulf Carl Johan Danneskiold-Samsøe (b. 1959)
                                                    - Count Ulrik Otto Hubert Viggo Danneskiold-Samsøe (b. 1965)
                                                      - Count Philip Christian Ulrik Manuel Danneskiold-Samsøe (b. 1989)
                                                      - Count Niklas Christian Sophus Laszlo Danneskiold-Samsøe (b. 1990)
                                                  - Count Niels Frederik Kjeld Viggo Danneskiold-Samsøe (1916-1994)
                                                    - Count Ulrik Christian Lauritz Danneskiold-Samsøe (b. 1945)
                                                      - Count Niels Danneskiold-Samsøe (b. 1982)
                                                    - Count Otto Frederik Aage Danneskiold-Samsøe (b. 1947)
                                                      - Count Rolf Danneskiold-Samsøe (b. 1976)
                                                      - Count Helge Danneskiold-Samsøe (b. 1981)
                                                    - Count Kjeld Viggo Gerhard Danneskiold-Samsøe (b. 1952)
                                                  - Count Oluf Erling Christoffer Viggo Danneskiold-Samsøe (1917)
                                                  - Count Ubbe Eyvind Gregers Sophus Viggo Danneskiold-Samsøe (1921-1978)
                                                    - Count Jakob Frederik Christian Danneskiold-Samsøe (b. 1968)
                                                      - Count Julius Valentin Danneskiold-Samsøe (b. 1991)
                                                    - Count Johan Conrad Sophus Danneskiold-Samsøe (b. 1970)
                                                      - Count Valdemar August Theodor Danneskiold-Samsøe (b. 2008)
                                                      - Count Vilfred Arthur Cornelius Danneskiold-Samsøe (b. 2012)
                                                - Count Knud Danneskiold-Samsøe (1876-1957)
                                              - Count Frederik Vilhelm Steen Danneskiold-Samsøe (1837-1895)
                                                - Count Frederik Sophus Christian Ludvig Danneskiold-Samsøe (1864-1944)
                                                - Count Einar Carl Otto Danneskiold-Samsøe (1868-1908)
                                                - Count Axel Edzard Ernest Danneskiold-Samsøe (1871-1925)
                                                  - Count Palle Julian Danneskiold-Samsøe (1906-1968)
                                                    - Count Thomas Godske Danneskiold-Samsøe (b. 1946)
                                                      - Count Mikkel Frederik Danneskiold-Samsøe (b. 1985)
                                              - Count Otto Ludvig August Balthazar Danneskiold-Samsøe (1841-1896)
                                                - Count Adam Sophus Danneskiold-Samsøe (1874-1961)
                                                  - Count Adam Otto Danneskiold-Samsøe (1910-1981)
                                                    - Count Bent Otto Aksel Danneskiold-Samsøe (b. 1943)
                                                    - Count Adam Peter Wilhelm Danneskiold-Samsøe (b. 1946)
                                                  - Count Ludvig Danneskiold-Samsøe (1926-1990)
                                          - Count Ulrik Adolph Danneskiold-Samsøe (1723-1751)
                                      - Count Friedrich Danneskiold-Samsøe (1703–1770)
                                        - Count Christian Ulrich Danneskiold-Samsøe (1725-1726)
                                    - Ulrik Christian Gyldenløve, Count of Samsø (1678–1719)
                                - Christian Ulrik Gyldenløve (1611–1640)
                                - Hans Ulrik Gyldenløve (1615–1645)
                                - Ulrik Christian Gyldenløve (1630–1658)
                          - Adolf, Duke of Schleswig-Holstein-Gottorp (1526–1586)
                            - Duke of Schleswig-Holstein-Gottorp (1575–1616)
                              - John Adolf, Duke of Schleswig-Holstein-Gottorp (1597–1659)
                                - Christian Albert, Duke of Schleswig-Holstein-Gottorp (1641–1695)
                                  - Frederick IV, Duke of Schleswig-Holstein-Gottorp (1671–1702)
                                    - Charles Frederick, Duke of Schleswig-Holstein-Gottorp (1700–1739)
                                      - Emperor Peter III of Russia (1728–1762)
                                        - Emperor Paul I of Russia (1754–1801)
                                          - Emperor Nicholas I of Russia (1796-1855)
                                            - Grand Duke Nicholas Nikolaevich of Russia (1831–1891)
                                              - Vladimir Nikolaevich Nikolaev (1873–1942) with issue
                                              - Nicholas Nikolaevich Nikolaev (1875–1902) with issue
                      - Gerhard VI, Count of Oldenburg (1428–1464)
                        - John V, Count of Oldenburg (1460–1526)
                          - Anthony I, Count of Oldenburg (1505–1573
                            - John VII, Count of Oldenburg (1540–1603)
                              - Anthony Günther, Count of Oldenburg (1583–1667)
                                - Anton I, Imperial Count of Aldenburg (1633–1680)
                                  - Anton II, Imperial Count of Aldenburg (1681–1738)

== See also ==
- House of Oldenburg
- List of members of the House of Schleswig-Holstein-Sonderburg-Glücksburg
