= Elimar =

Elimar is a given name. Notable people with the name include:

- Elimar I, Count of Oldenburg (r. 1040–1112)
- Elimar II, Count of Oldenburg (r. 1108–1142)
- Duke Elimar of Oldenburg (1844–1895)
- Elimar Díaz (born 1989), Venezuelan politician
- Elimar Freiherr von Fürstenberg (1910–1981), German politician
- Elimar Klebs (1852–1918), German historian
- Elimar Kloos, German boxer
