= House of Oldenburg =

European dynasty of German origin

- Country: List: Russian Empire, Kingdom of Denmark, Kingdom of Norway, Kingdom of Sweden, Kingdom of Greece, United Kingdom, Grand Duchy of Oldenburg, Duchy of Saxe-Lauenburg, Duchy of Schleswig, Duchy of Holstein
- Founded: 1101; 925 years ago
- Founder: Elimar I, Count of Oldenburg
- Current head: Friedrich Ferdinand, Prince of Schleswig-Holstein (heir of the last extant ducal branch of the House of Schleswig-Holstein-Sonderburg)
- Final ruler: Russia: Nicholas II (1894–1917) Sweden: Charles XIII (1809–1818) Greece: Constantine II (1964–1973) Oldenburg: Friedrich August II (1900–1918) Schleswig, Holstein and Saxe-Lauenburg: Christian IX (1863–1864) Denmark: Margrethe II (agnatic; 1972–2024)
- Titles: List: Current: King of Norway; King of the United Kingdom; King of Denmark (cognatic) Former: Emperor of Russia; King of Sweden; King of the Hellenes; King of Iceland; King of Livonia; Grand Duke of Oldenburg; Duke of Saxe-Lauenburg; Duke of Schleswig; Duke of Holstein; Duke of Oldenburg; Count of Oldenburg
- Deposition: Russia: February Revolution, 1917 Greece: 1974 Greek republic referendum, 1974 Oldenburg: German Revolution, 1918 Schleswig, Holstein and Saxe-Lauenburg: Second Schleswig War, 1864
- Branches: List: Comital line (extinct); Haderslev (extinct); Gottorp; Sonderburg; Danneskiold (illegitimate)

The House of Oldenburg is a German dynasty whose members rule or have ruled in Denmark, Iceland, Greece, Norway, Russia, Sweden, the United Kingdom, Livonia, Schleswig, Holstein, and Oldenburg. The current kings of Norway and the United Kingdom are patrilineal descendants of the Glücksburg branch of this house.

The dynasty rose to prominence when Count Christian of Oldenburg was elected King of Denmark in 1448, of Norway in 1450, and of Sweden in 1457. Elimar I, Count of Oldenburg is the earliest known direct male-line ancestor of King Haakon VIII and King Charles III. King Frederik X is also part of the House of Oldenburg, cognatically.

== History ==
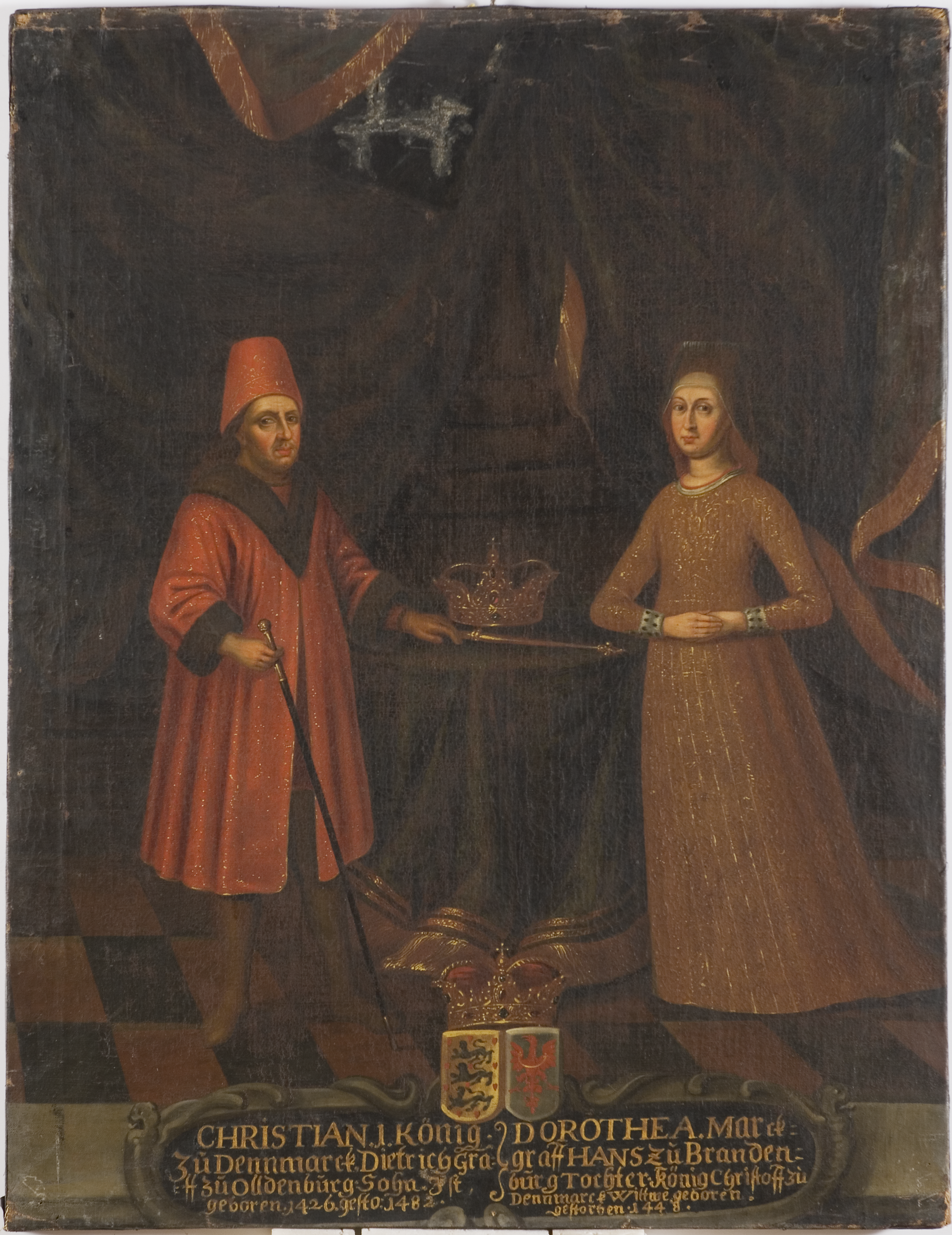
King Christian I and Queen Dorothea of Denmark started the royal dynasty in 1450 with the birth of their first child

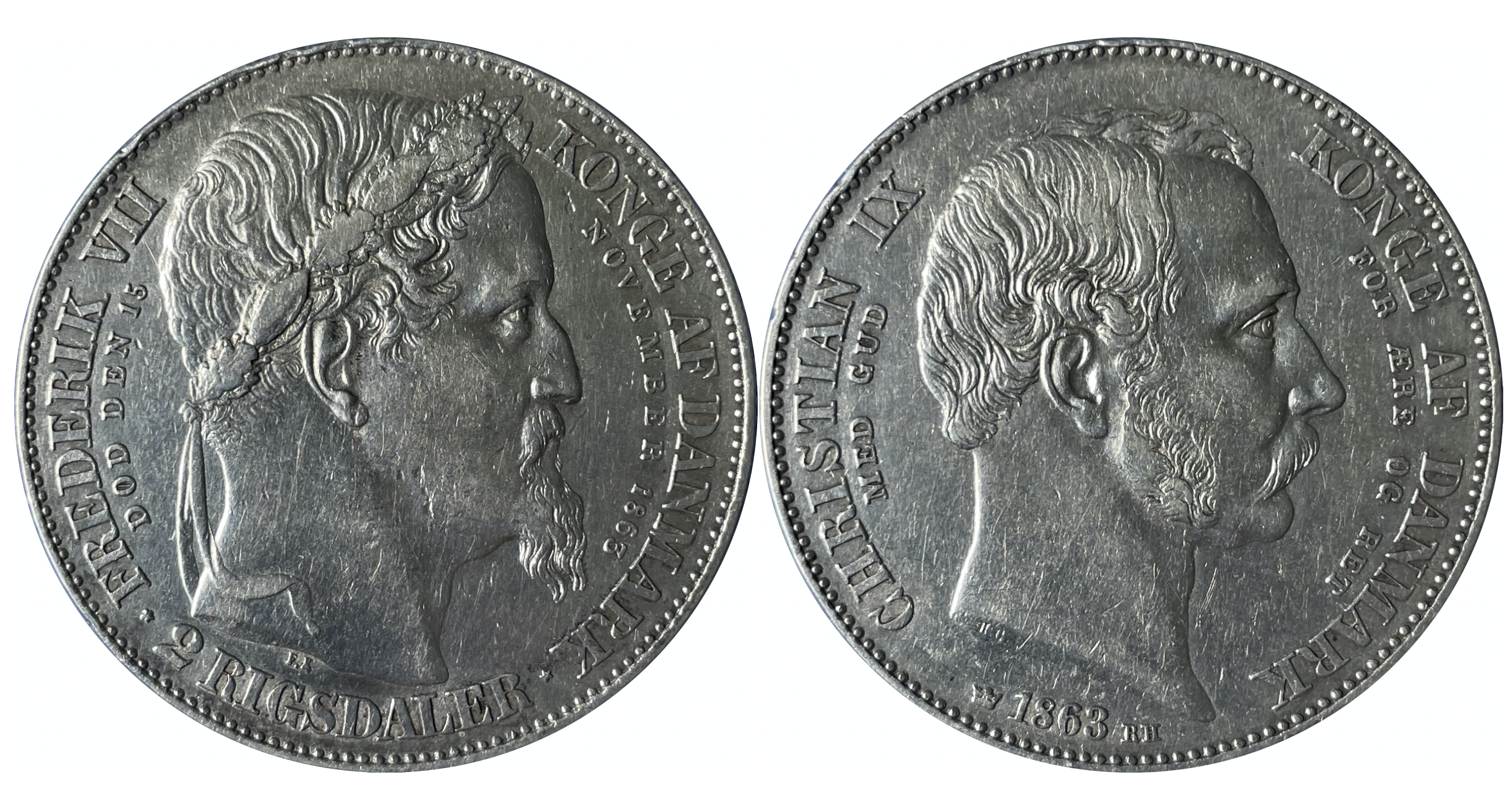
2 rigsdaler – death of Frederik VII and accession of Christian IX marking the transfer of the throne to the Glucksburg branch of the House of Oldenburg

Count Elimar I was first mentioned in 1091. The ancestral home of the family is Oldenburg Castle. In the 12th century, Rastede Monastery near Oldenburg became their house monastery and later their country seat to this day. Marriages of medieval counts of Oldenburg paved the way for their heirs to become kings of the three Scandinavian kingdoms. Through marriage with a descendant of King Valdemar I of Sweden and of King Eric IV of Denmark, a claim to Sweden and Denmark was staked as early as 1350.

At that time, the chief competitor to succeed Margaret I of Denmark (1353–1412), queen of Denmark, Sweden, and Norway, to the Northern thrones was the House of Mecklenburg, while other aspirants included the Duke of Saxe-Lauenburg. In 1423, Theodoric of Oldenburg married Hedwig of Holstein, a descendant of King Magnus Ladulås of Sweden, of King Haakon V of Norway, and of the kings Eric V and Abel of Denmark. Their son Christian (the abovementioned) became the king of all three kingdoms of the whole Kalmar Union.

== Main line ==
- Counts of Oldenburg (1101–1448, 1667–1773)
- Kings of Denmark (1448–1863)
- Kings of Norway (1450–1814)
- Kings of Sweden (1457–1464, 1497–1501, 1520–1521)
- Dukes of Schleswig (1460–1864) (divided among various rulers 1544–1721)
- Counts (1460–1574) and Dukes (1574–1864) of Holstein (divided among various rulers 1544–1773)
- Dukes of Saxe-Lauenburg (1815–1863)

== Branches ==
- Oldenburg comital line (1448–1667), extinct in 1667
- Schleswig-Holstein-Haderslev (1544–1580), extinct in 1580
- Schleswig-Holstein-Gottorp
  1. Dukes of Holstein-Gottorp (1544–1739)
  - Holstein-Gottorp-Romanov (commonly still called Romanov)
    1. Dukes of Holstein-Gottorp (1739–1773)
    2. Emperors of Russia (1762, 1796–1917)
  - Holstein-Gottorp (Swedish line), extinct in 1877
    1. Kings of Sweden (1751–1818)
    2. King of Norway (1814–1818)
  - Holstein-Gottorp (Grand ducal line)
    1. Dukes and Grand Dukes of Oldenburg (1774–1918)
- Schleswig-Holstein-Sonderburg
  - Schleswig-Holstein-Sonderburg-Augustenburg, extinct in 1931
    1. Dukes of Schleswig-Holstein (claimant in 1863, then titular dukes until 1931)
  - Schleswig-Holstein-Sonderburg-Glücksburg (name changed from Schleswig-Holstein-Sonderburg-Beck in 1825)
    1. Dukes of Schleswig-Holstein (titular dukes since 1931)
    2. Kings and queens of Denmark (1863–2024)
    3. Dukes of Saxe-Lauenburg (1863–1864)
    4. King of Iceland (1918–1944)
    5. Kings of Norway (1905–present)
    6. Kings of the Hellenes (1863–1924, 1935–1973)
    7. Kings of the United Kingdom and other Commonwealth Realms (2022–present)
- Danneskiold (illegitimate branch)
  - Danneskiold-Løvendal, extinct in 1829
  - Danneskiold-Laurvig, extinct in 1783
  - Danneskiold-Samsøe

== Family tree of the House of Oldenburg (Counts of Oldenburg) ==
House of Oldenburg

House of Oldenburg
Elimar I Count of Oldenburg r. 1091–1108 c. 1060–1112
Elimar II; Count of Oldenburg r. 1108–1142
Christian I the Quarrelsome; Count of Oldenburg r. 1143–1167 ?–1167
Maurice; Count of Oldenburg r. 1169–1211 c. 1150 – c. 1211
Christian II; Count of Oldenburg r. 1209–1233 ?–1233	Otto I Count of Oldenburg r. 1209–1251 c. 1175–1251
John I Count of Oldenburg r. 1233–1270 c. 1210 – c. 1270
Christian III; Count of Oldenburg r. 1270–1285 ?–1285
John II; Count of Oldenburg r. 1285–1301 ? – c. 1314/16
Christian IV; Count of Oldenburg r. 1301–1323	John III; Count of Oldenburg r. 1305–1345	Conrad I Count of Oldenburg r. 1324–1347 ?–1347
John IV; Count of Oldenburg r. 1345–1356	Conrad II; Count of Oldenburg r. 1368–1401 ?–1401	Christian V Count of Oldenburg r. 1368–1398 c. 1342 – c. 1399
Maurice II; Count of Oldenburg r. 1401–1420	Dietrich; Fortunatus; Count of Oldenburg r. 1403–1440; 1398–1440	Christian VI; Count of Oldenburg r. 1403–1421
Christian I King of Denmark r. 1448–1481; King of Norway r. 1450–1481; King of Sweden r. 1457–1464; 1426–1481	Gerhard VI; Count of Oldenburg r. 1450–1482; 1430–1500
Kings of Denmark
Adolph; Count of Oldenburg- Delmenhorst r. 1482–1500 before 1463–1500	John V Count of Oldenburg r. 1500–1526; 1460–1526
John VI; Count of Oldenburg r. 1526–1529; 1501–1548	George; Count of Oldenburg r. 1526–1529	Christopher; Count of Oldenburg r. 1526–1566 c. 1504–1566	Anthony I Count of Oldenburg r. 1526–1573; 1505–1573
John VII; Count of Oldenburg r. 1573–1603; 1540–1603	Anthony II; Count of Oldenburg r. 1573–1619
Anthony; Günther; Count of Oldenburg r. 1603–1667; 1583–1667

=== Oldenburg descent from the Danish royal line ===
House of Estridsen
Valdemar II of Denmark
Christopher I of Denmark	Abel, King of Denmark	Eric IV of Denmark
Eric V of Denmark	Sophie, Princess of Anhalt-Bernburg	Sophia, Queen of Sweden
Richeza of Denmark	Bernhard II, Prince of Anhalt-Bernburg	Ingeborg, Countess of Holstein-Plön
Sophie of Mecklenburg-Werle	Bernhard III, Prince of Anhalt-Bernburg	Gerhard IV, Count of Holstein-Plön
Henry II, Count of Holstein-Rendsburg	Catherine of Anhalt-Bernburg	Ingeborg, Countess of Oldenburg
Gerhard VI, Count of Holstein-Rendsburg	Catherine Elisabeth of Brunswick-Lüneburg	Christian V, Count of Oldenburg
Hedvig of Holstein	Dietrich, Count of Oldenburg
Christian I
House of Oldenburg

== Family tree of the House of Oldenburg (Senior line) ==
House of Oldenburg

King of Denmark (1448–1533, 1534–2024)

King of Norway (1450–1481, 1483–1523, 1524–1533, 1537–1814, 1905–present)

King of the Kalmar Union (1457–1464, 1497–1501, 1520–1521)

King of Denmark–Norway (1524–1533, 1537–1814)

King of the Hellenes (1863–1924, 1935–1973)

King of the United Kingdom (2022–present)

House of Oldenburg
Elimar I Count of Oldenburg r. 1091–1108 c. 1040–1112
Elimar II; Count of Oldenburg r. 1108–1142
Christian I the Quarrelsome; Count of Oldenburg r. 1143–1167 ?–1167
Maurice; Count of Oldenburg r. 1169–1211 c. 1145 – c. 1211
Christian II; Count of Oldenburg r. 1209–1233 ?–1233
John I Count of Oldenburg r. 1233–1270 c. 1204 – c. 1270
Christian III; Count of Oldenburg r. 1270–1285 ?–1285
John II; Count of Oldenburg r. 1285–1301 ?– c. 1314/6
Conrad I Count of Oldenburg r. 1324–1347 ?–1347
Christian V Count of Oldenburg r. 1368–1398 c. 1342 – c. 1399
Dietrich; Fortunatus; Count of Oldenburg r. 1403–1440; 1398–1440
Christian I King of Denmark r. 1448–1481; King of Norway r. 1450–1481; King of Sweden r. 1457–1464; 1426–1481
John; King of Denmark r. 1481–1513; King of Norway r. 1483–1513; King of Sweden r. 1497–1501; 1455–1513	Frederick I King of Denmark r. 1523–1533; King of Norway r. 1524–1533; 1471–1533
House of Schleswig- Holstein-Haderslev	House of Schleswig- Holstein-Gottorp
Christian II; King of Denmark and Norway r. 1513–1523; King of Sweden r. 1520–1521; 1481–1559	Christian III; King of Denmark r. 1534–1559; King of Norway r. 1537–1559; 1503–1559	John the Elder; Duke of Schleswig- Holstein-Haderslev r. 1544–1580; 1521–1580	Adolf; Duke of Schleswig- Holstein-Gottorp r. 1544–1586; 1526–1586
House of Schleswig- Holstein-Sonderburg
Frederick II; King of Denmark and Norway r. 1559–1588; 1534–1588	John the Younger; Duke of Schleswig- Holstein-Sonderburg r. 1564–1622; 1545–1622
House of Schleswig- Holstein-Sonderburg- Norburg	House of Schleswig- Holstein-Sonderburg- Plön
Christian IV; King of Denmark and Norway r. 1588–1648; 1577–1648	Alexander; Duke of Schleswig- Holstein-Sonderburg r. 1622–1627; 1573–1627	John Adolph; Duke of Schleswig- Holstein-Sonderburg- Norburg r. 1622–1624; 1576–1624	Frederick; Duke of Schleswig- Holstein-Sonderburg- Norburg r. 1624–1658; 1581–1658	Joachim Ernest I Duke of Schleswig- Holstein-Sonderburg- Plön r. 1622–1671; 1595–1671
House of Schleswig- Holstein-Sonderburg- Augustenburg	House of Schleswig- Holstein-Sonderburg- Beck	House of Schleswig- Holstein-Sonderburg- Plön-Rethwisch
Frederick III; King of Denmark and Norway r. 1648–1670; 1609–1670	John Christian; Duke of Schleswig- Holstein-Sonderburg r. 1627–1627; 1607–1653	Ernest Günther I Duke of Schleswig- Holstein-Sonderburg -Augustenburg r. 1627–1689; 1609–1689	August Philip; Duke of Schleswig- Holstein-Sonderburg- Beck r. 1646–1675; 1612–1675	John Bogislaw; Duke of Schleswig- Holstein-Sonderburg- Norburg r. 1658–1669; 1629–1669	Joachim Ernest II; Duke of Schleswig- Holstein-Sonderburg- Plön-Rethwisch r. 1671–1700; 1637–1700	John Adolphus; Duke of Schleswig- Holstein-Sonderburg- Plön r. 1671–1704; 1634–1704	Augustus; Duke of Schleswig- Holstein-Sonderburg- Plön-Norburg r. 1679–1699; 1635–1699
House of Schleswig- Holstein-Sonderburg- Franzhagen
Christian V King of Denmark and Norway r. 1670–1699; 1646–1699	Christian Adolf I Duke of Schleswig- Holstein-Sonderburg r. 1653–1668; Duke of Schleswig- Holstein-Sonderburg- Franzhagen r. 1676–1702; 1641–1702	Frederick; Duke of Schleswig- Holstein-Sonderburg -Augustenburg r. 1689–1692; 1652–1692	Ernest August; Duke of Schleswig- Holstein-Sonderburg -Augustenburg r. 1692–1731; 1660–1731	Frederick William; 1668–1714	August; Duke of Schleswig- Holstein-Sonderburg- Beck r. 1675–1689; 1652–1689	Frederick Louis; Duke of Schleswig- Holstein-Sonderburg- Beck r. 1719–1728; 1653–1728	John Ernest; Ferdinand; Duke of Schleswig- Holstein-Sonderburg- Plön-Rethwisch r. 1700–1729; 1684–1729	Adolphus Augustus; 1680–1704	Joachim Frederick; Duke of Schleswig- Holstein-Sonderburg- Plön r. 1706–1722; 1668–1722	Christian Charles; 1674–1706
Frederick IV; King of Denmark and Norway r. 1699–1730; 1671–1730	Christian Leopold; Duke of Schleswig- Holstein-Sonderburg- Franzhagen r. 1702–1707; 1678–1707	Louis Charles; Duke of Schleswig- Holstein-Sonderburg- Franzhagen r. 1707; 1684–1707	Christian August I Duke of Schleswig- Holstein-Sonderburg -Augustenburg r. 1731–1754; 1696–1754	Frederick William I Duke of Schleswig- Holstein-Sonderburg- Beck r. 1689–1719; 1682–1719	Frederick William II; Duke of Schleswig- Holstein-Sonderburg- Beck r. 1728–1749; 1687–1749	Charles Louis; Duke of Schleswig- Holstein-Sonderburg- Beck r. 1757–1774; 1690–1774	Peter August; Duke of Schleswig- Holstein-Sonderburg- Beck r. 1774–1775; 1697–1775	Leopold Augustus; Duke of Schleswig- Holstein-Sonderburg- Plön r. 1704–1706; 1702–1706	Frederick Charles; Duke of Schleswig- Holstein-Sonderburg- Plön r. 1722–1761; 1706–1761
Christian VI; King of Denmark and Norway r. 1730–1746; 1699–1746	Christian Adolf II; Duke of Schleswig- Holstein-Sonderburg- Franzhagen r. 1707–1709; 1707–1709	Frederick Christian I Duke of Schleswig- Holstein-Sonderburg -Augustenburg r. 1754–1794; 1721–1794	Frederick William III; Duke of Schleswig- Holstein-Sonderburg- Beck r. 1749–1757; 1723–1757	Charles Anthony; August; 1727–1759
Frederick V King of Denmark and Norway r. 1746–1766; 1723–1766	Frederick Christian II; Duke of Schleswig- Holstein-Sonderburg -Augustenburg r. 1794–1814; 1765–1814	Frederick Charles; Louis; Duke of Schleswig- Holstein-Sonderburg- Beck r. 1775–1816; 1757–1816
House of Schleswig- Holstein-Sonderburg- Glücksburg
Christian VII; King of Denmark and Norway r. 1766–1808; 1749–1808	Frederick; Regent of Denmark- Norway; 1772–1784; 1753–1805	Christian August II; Duke of Schleswig- Holstein-Sonderburg -Augustenburg r. 1814–1863; 1798–1869	Frederick William; Duke of Schleswig- Holstein-Sonderburg- Beck r. 1816–1825; Duke of Schleswig- Holstein-Sonderburg- Glücksburg r. 1825–1831; 1785–1831
Danish Royal Family
Frederick VI; King of Denmark r. 1808–1839; King of Norway r. 1808–1814; 1768–1839	Christian VIII; King of Denmark r. 1839–1848; King of Norway r. 1814; 1786–1848	Frederick VIII; Duke of Schleswig- Holstein r. 1863–1880; 1829–1880	Christian; House of Schleswig-Holstein-Sonderburg-Augustenburg; 1831–1917	Charles; Duke of Schleswig- Holstein-Sonderburg- Glücksburg r. 1831–1878; 1813–1878	Frederick; Duke of Schleswig- Holstein-Sonderburg- Glücksburg r. 1878–1885; 1814–1885	Christian IX; King of Denmark r. 1863–1906; 1818–1906
Greek Royal Family
Frederick VII; King of Denmark r. 1848–1863; 1808–1863	Ernst Günther II; Duke of Schleswig-Holstein r. 1880–1921; 1863–1921	Albert; Duke of Schleswig- Holstein r. 1921–1931; 1869–1931	Frederick Ferdinand; Duke of Schleswig-Holstein r. 1885–1934; 1855–1934	Frederik VIII; King of Denmark r. 1906–1912; 1843–1912	George I King of the Hellenes r. 1863–1913; 1845–1913
Norwegian Royal Family
William Frederick; Duke of Schleswig-Holstein r. 1934–1965; 1891–1965	Christian X King of Denmark r. 1912–1947; King of Iceland r. 1918–1944; 1870–1947	Haakon VII; King of Norway r. 1905–1957; 1872–1957	Constantine I King of the Hellenes r. 1913–1917, 1920–1922; 1868–1923	Andrew; Prince of Greece and Denmark; 1882–1944
House of Mountbatten
Peter Frederick; Duke of Schleswig-Holstein r. 1965–1980; 1922–1980	Frederik IX; King of Denmark r. 1947–1972; 1899–1972	Olav V King of Norway r. 1957–1991; 1903–1991	George II; King of the Hellenes r. 1922–1924, 1935–1947; 1890–1947	Alexander; King of the Hellenes r. 1917–1920; 1893–1920	Paul; King of the Hellenes r. 1947–1964; 1901–1964	Philip; Duke of Edinburgh; 1921–2021
Christopher; Duke of Schleswig-Holstein r. 1980–2023; 1949–2023	Margrethe II; Queen of Denmark r. 1972–2024; 1940–present	Harald V King of Norway r. 1991–2026; 1937–2026	Constantine II; King of the Hellenes r. 1964–1973; 1940–2023	Charles III; King of the United Kingdom r. 2022–present 1948–present
Friedrich Ferdinand; Duke of Schleswig-Holstein r. 2023–present 1985–present	Haakon VIII; King of Norway r. 2026–present 1973–present

== List of head of the House of Oldenburg ==
- Main line of Oldenburg (1101–1863, Counts of Oldenburg: 1101–1448, Kings of Denmark: 1448–1863)
  - Elimar I (1040–1112, Reign: 1091–1108) – Count of Oldenburg
  - Elimar II (1070–1142, Reign: 1108–1142) – Count of Oldenburg
  - Christian I (1123–1167, Reign: 1142–1167) – Count of Oldenburg
  - Maurice (1145–1209, Reign: 1167–1209) – Count of Oldenburg
  - Otto I (1175–1251, Reign: 1209–1251) – Count of Oldenburg
  - Christian II (1184–1233, Reign: 1209–1233) – Count of Oldenburg
  - John I (1204–1270, Reign: 1233–1270) – Count of Oldenburg
  - Christian III (?–1285, Reign: 1270–1285) – Count of Oldenburg
  - Otto II (?–1112, Reign: 1272–1278) – Count of Oldenburg
  - John II (?–1315, Reign: 1285–1315) – Count of Oldenburg
  - Christian IV (?–1323, Reign: 1315–1323) – Count of Oldenburg
  - John III (1295–1345, Reign: 1315–1345) – Count of Oldenburg
  - Conrad I (?–1347, Reign: 1324–1347) – Count of Oldenburg
  - John IV (?–1356, Reign: 1345–1356) – Count of Oldenburg
  - Conrad II (?–1401, Reign: 1347–1401) – Count of Oldenburg
  - Christian V (1342–1399, Reign: 1368–1398) – Count of Oldenburg
  - Maurice II (1381–1420, Reign: 1401–1420) – Count of Oldenburg
  - Cristian VI (1394–1421, Reign: 1403–1421) – Count of Oldenburg
  - Dietrich (1390–1440, Reign: 1403–1440) – Count of Oldenburg
  - Christian I (1426–1481) – Count of Oldenburg (Reign: 1440–1448), King of Denmark (Reign: 1448–1481)
  - John (1455–1513, Reign: 1481–1513) – King of Denmark
  - Christian II (1481–1559, Reign: 1513–1523) – King of Denmark
  - Frederick I (1471–1533, Reign: 1523–1533) – King of Denmark
  - Christian III (1503–1559, Reign: 1534–1559) – King of Denmark
  - Frederick II (1534–1588, Reign: 1559–1588) – King of Denmark
  - Christian IV (1577–1648, Reign: 1588–1648) – King of Denmark
  - Frederick III (1609–1670, Reign: 1648–1670) – King of Denmark
  - Christian V (1646–1699, Reign: 1670–1699) – King of Denmark
  - Frederick IV (1671–1730, Reign: 1699–1730) – King of Denmark
  - Christian VI (1699–1746, Reign: 1730–1746) – King of Denmark
  - Frederick V (1723–1766, Reign: 1746–1766) – King of Denmark
  - Christian VII (1749–1808, Reign: 1766–1808) – King of Denmark
  - Frederick VI (1768–1839, Reign: 1808–1839) – King of Denmark
  - Christian VIII (1786–1848, Reign: 1839–1848) – King of Denmark
  - Frederick VII (1808–1863, Reign: 1848–1863) – King of Denmark
- Schleswig-Holstein-Sonderburg (1863–)
  - Schleswig-Holstein-Sonderburg-Augustenburg (1863–1931)
    - Christian August II (1798–1869, Reign: 1863–1869) – Duke of Schleswig-Holstein-Sonderburg-Augsthenburg
    - Frederick VIII (1829–1880, Reign: 1869–1880) – Duke of Schleswig-Holstein (nominally)
    - Ernst Günther II (1863–1921, Reign: 1880–1921) – Duke of Schleswig-Holstein (nominally)
    - Albert (1869–1931, Reign: 1921–1931) – Duke of Schleswig-Holstein (nominally)
  - Schleswig-Holstein-Sonderburg-Glücksburg (1931–)
    - Friedrich Ferdinand (1855–1934, Reign: 1931–1934) – Duke of Schleswig-Holstein (nominally)
    - Wilhelm Friedrich (1891–1965, Reign: 1934–1965) – Duke of Schleswig-Holstein (nominally)
    - Peter (1922–1980, Reign: 1965–1980) – Duke of Schleswig-Holstein (nominally)
    - Christoph (1949–2023, Reign: 1980–2023) – Duke of Schleswig-Holstein (nominally)
    - Friedrich Ferdinand (1985–present, Reign: 2023–present) – Duke of Schleswig-Holstein (nominally)

== Line of succession ==
By agnatic primogeniture:

- Frederick I of Denmark (1471–1533)
  - Christian III of Denmark (1503–1559)
    - John II, Duke of Schleswig-Holstein-Sonderburg (1545–1622)
      - Alexander, Duke of Schleswig-Holstein-Sonderburg (1573–1627)
        - August Philipp, Duke of Schleswig-Holstein-Sonderburg-Beck (1612–1675)
          - Frederick Louis, Duke of Schleswig-Holstein-Sonderburg-Beck (1653–1728)
            - Peter August, Duke of Schleswig-Holstein-Sonderburg-Beck (1697–1775)
              - Prince Karl Anton August of Schleswig-Holstein-Sonderburg-Beck (1727–1759)
                - Friedrich Karl Ludwig, Duke of Schleswig-Holstein-Sonderburg-Beck (1757–1816)
                  - Friedrich Wilhelm, Duke of Schleswig-Holstein-Sonderburg-Glücksburg (1785–1831)
                    - Friedrich, Duke of Schleswig-Holstein-Sonderburg-Glücksburg (1814–1885)
                      - Friedrich Ferdinand, Duke of Schleswig-Holstein (1855–1934)
                        - Wilhelm Friedrich, Duke of Schleswig-Holstein (1891–1965)
                          - Peter, Duke of Schleswig-Holstein (1922–1980)
                            - Christoph, Prince of Schleswig-Holstein (1949–2023)
                              - Friedrich Ferdinand, Prince of Schleswig-Holstein (b. 1985)
                                - (1) Alfred, Hereditary Prince of Schleswig-Holstein (b. 2019)
                                - (2) Prince Albert of Schleswig-Holstein (b. 2020)
                              - (3) Prince Constantin of Schleswig-Holstein (b. 1986)
                                - (4) Prince Tassilo of Schleswig-Holstein (b. 2023)
                              - (5) Prince Leopold of Schleswig-Holstein (b. 1991)
                            - (6) Prince Alexander of Schleswig-Holstein (b. 1953)
                              - (7) Prince Julian of Schleswig-Holstein (b. 1997)
                    - Christian IX of Denmark (1818–1906)
                      - Frederick VIII of Denmark (1843–1912)
                        - Christian X of Denmark (1870–1947)
                          - Knud, Hereditary Prince of Denmark (1900–1976)
                            - (8) Count Ingolf of Rosenborg (b. 1940)
                        - Haakon VII of Norway (1872–1957)
                          - Olav V of Norway (1903–1991)
                            - Harald V of Norway (1937–2026)
                              - (9) Haakon VIII of Norway (b. 1973)
                                - (10) Prince Sverre Magnus of Norway (b. 2005)
                        - Prince Harald of Denmark (1876–1949)
                          - Count Oluf of Rosenborg (1923–1990)
                            - (11) Count Ulrik of Rosenborg (b. 1950)
                              - (12) Count Philip of Rosenborg (b. 1986)
                      - George I of Greece (1845–1913)
                        - Constantine I of Greece (1868–1923)
                          - Paul of Greece (1901–1964)
                            - Constantine II of Greece (1940–2023)
                              - (13) Pavlos, Crown Prince of Greece (b. 1967)
                                - (14) Prince Constantine Alexios of Greece and Denmark (b. 1998)
                                - (15) Prince Achileas Andreas of Greece and Denmark (b. 2000)
                                - (16) Prince Odysseas Kimon of Greece and Denmark (b. 2004)
                                - (17) Prince Aristide Stavros of Greece and Denmark (b. 2008)
                              - (18) Prince Nikolaos of Greece and Denmark (b. 1969)
                              - (19) Prince Philippos of Greece and Denmark (b. 1986)
                                - (20) Prince Kimon Thomas Konstantinos of Greece and Denmark (b. 2026)
                        - Prince Andrew of Greece and Denmark (1882–1944)
                          - Prince Philip, Duke of Edinburgh (1921–2021)
                            - (21) Charles III of the United Kingdom (b. 1948)
                              - (22) William, Prince of Wales (b. 1982)
                                - (23) Prince George of Wales (b. 2013)
                                - (24) Prince Louis of Wales (b. 2018)
                              - (25) Prince Harry, Duke of Sussex (b. 1984)
                                - (26) Prince Archie of Sussex (b. 2019)
                            - (27) Andrew Mountbatten-Windsor (b. 1960)
                            - (28) Prince Edward, Duke of Edinburgh (b. 1964)
                              - (29) James Mountbatten-Windsor, Earl of Wessex (b. 2007)
                      - Prince Valdemar of Denmark (1858–1939)
                        - Prince Axel of Denmark (1888–1964)
                          - Count Flemming of Rosenborg (1922–2002)
                            - (30) Count Axel of Rosenborg (b. 1950)
                              - (31) Count Carl Johan of Rosenborg (b. 1979)
                                - (32) Count Valdemar of Rosenborg (b. 2014)
                              - (33) Count Alexander Flemming of Rosenborg (b. 1993)
                            - (34) Count Birger of Rosenborg (b. 1950)
                            - (35) Count Carl Johan of Rosenborg (b. 1952)
                        - Prince Erik, Count of Rosenborg (1890–1950)
                          - Count Christian of Rosenborg (1932–1997)
                            - (36) Count Valdemar of Rosenborg (b. 1965)
                              - (37) Count Nicolai of Rosenborg (b. 1997)
  - Adolf, Duke of Holstein-Gottorp (1526–1586)
    - John Adolf, Duke of Holstein-Gottorp (1575–1616)
      - Frederick III, Duke of Holstein-Gottorp (1597–1659)
        - Christian Albert, Duke of Holstein-Gottorp (1641–1695)
          - Frederick IV, Duke of Holstein-Gottorp (1671–1702)
            - Charles Frederick, Duke of Holstein-Gottorp (1700–1739)
              - Peter III of Russia (1728–1762)
                - Paul I of Russia (1728–1762)
                  - Nicholas I of Russia (1796–1855)
                    - Alexander II of Russia (1818–1881)
                      - Nicholas Alexandrovich, Tsesarevich of Russia (1843–1865)
                      - Alexander III of Russia (1845–1894)
                        - Nicholas II of Russia (1868–1918)
                      - Grand Duke Paul Alexandrovich of Russia (1860–1919)
                        - Grand Duke Dmitri Pavlovich of Russia (1891–1941)
                          - Prince Paul Dimitrievich Romanovsky-Ilyinsky (1928–2004)
                            - (38) Prince Dimitri Pavlovich Romanovsky-Ilyinsky (b. 1954)
                            - (39) Prince Michael Pavlovich Romanovsky-Ilyinsky (b. 1961)
                    - Grand Duke Michael Nicolaevich of Russia (1832–1909)
                      - Grand Duke Alexander Mikhailovich of Russia (1866–1933)
                        - Prince Andrei Alexandrovich of Russia (1897–1981)
                          - Andrew Andreevich, Prince of Russia (1923–2021)
                            - (40) Alexis Andreevich, Prince of Russia (b. 1953)
                            - (41) Prince Peter Andreevich of Russia (b. 1961)
                            - (42) Prince Andrew Andreevich of Russia (b. 1963)
                        - Prince Rostislav Alexandrovich of Russia (1902–1978)
                          - Prince Rostislav Rostislavovich of Russia (1938–1999)
                            - (43) Prince Rostislav Rostislavovich of Russia (b. 1985)
                            - (44) Prince Nikita Rostislavovich of Russia (b. 1987)
                          - Prince Nicholas Rostislavovich of Russia (1945–2000)
                            - (45) Prince Nicholas Nicolaevich of Russia (b. 1968)
                            - (46) Prince Daniel Nicolaevich of Russia (b. 1972)
                              - (47) Prince Jackson Daniel Danielaevich of Russia (b. 2009)
          - Prince Christian August of Holstein-Gottorp (1673–1726)
            - Prince Georg Ludwig of Holstein-Gottorp (1719–1763)
              - Peter I, Grand Duke of Oldenburg (1755–1829)
                - Augustus, Grand Duke of Oldenburg (1783–1853)
                  - Peter II, Grand Duke of Oldenburg (1827–1900)
                    - Frederick Augustus II, Grand Duke of Oldenburg (1852–1931)
                      - Nikolaus, Hereditary Grand Duke of Oldenburg (1897–1970)
                        - Anton Günther, Duke of Oldenburg (1923–2014)
                          - (48) Christian, Duke of Oldenburg (b. 1955)
                            - (49) Alexander, Hereditary Duke of Oldenburg (b. 1990)
                            - (50) Duke Philipp of Oldenburg (b. 1991)
                            - (51) Duke Anton Friedrich of Oldenburg (b. 1993)
                        - Duke Peter of Oldenburg (1926–2016)
                          - (52) Duke Nikolaus of Oldenburg (b. 1955)
                            - (53) Duke Christoph of Oldenburg (b. 1985)
                            - (54) Duke Georg of Oldenburg (b. 1990)
                            - (55) Duke Oscar of Oldenburg (b. 1991)
                        - Duke Friedrich August of Oldenburg (1936–2017)
                          - (56) Duke Paul-Wladimir of Oldenburg (b. 1969)
                            - (57) Duke Kirill of Oldenburg (b. 2002)
                            - (58) Duke Carlos of Oldenburg (b. 2004)
                            - (59) Duke Paul of Oldenburg (b. 2005)
                            - (60) Duke Louis of Oldenburg (b. 2012)
                        - (61) Duke Huno of Oldenburg (b. 1940)
                        - Duke Johann of Oldenburg (1940–2025)
                          - (62) Duke Konstantin Nikolaus of Oldenburg (b. 1975)

== Historical images ==
The County of Oldenburg

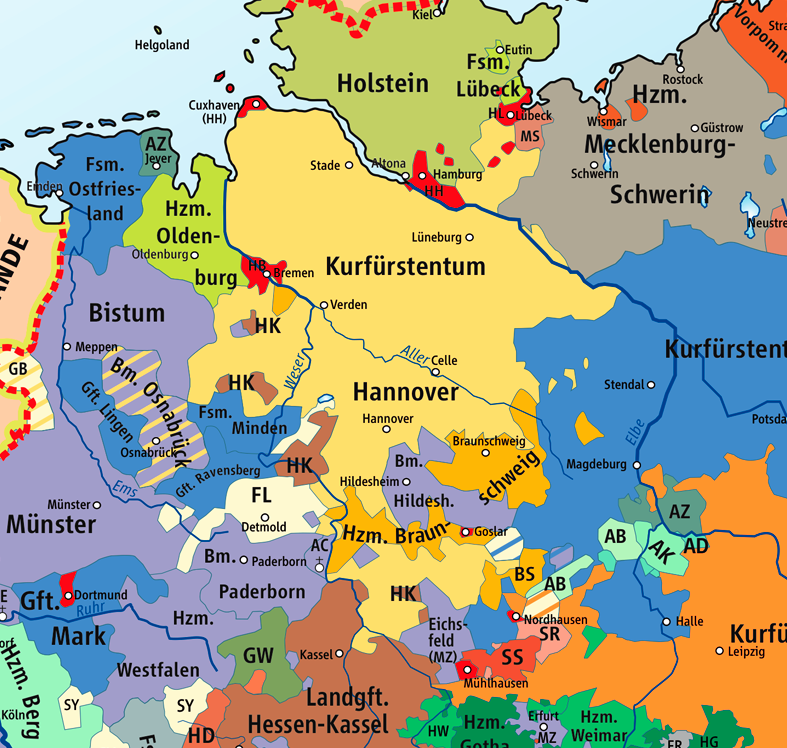
The Duchy of Oldenburg in 1789 (in the northwest, Hzm. Oldenburg, light green)

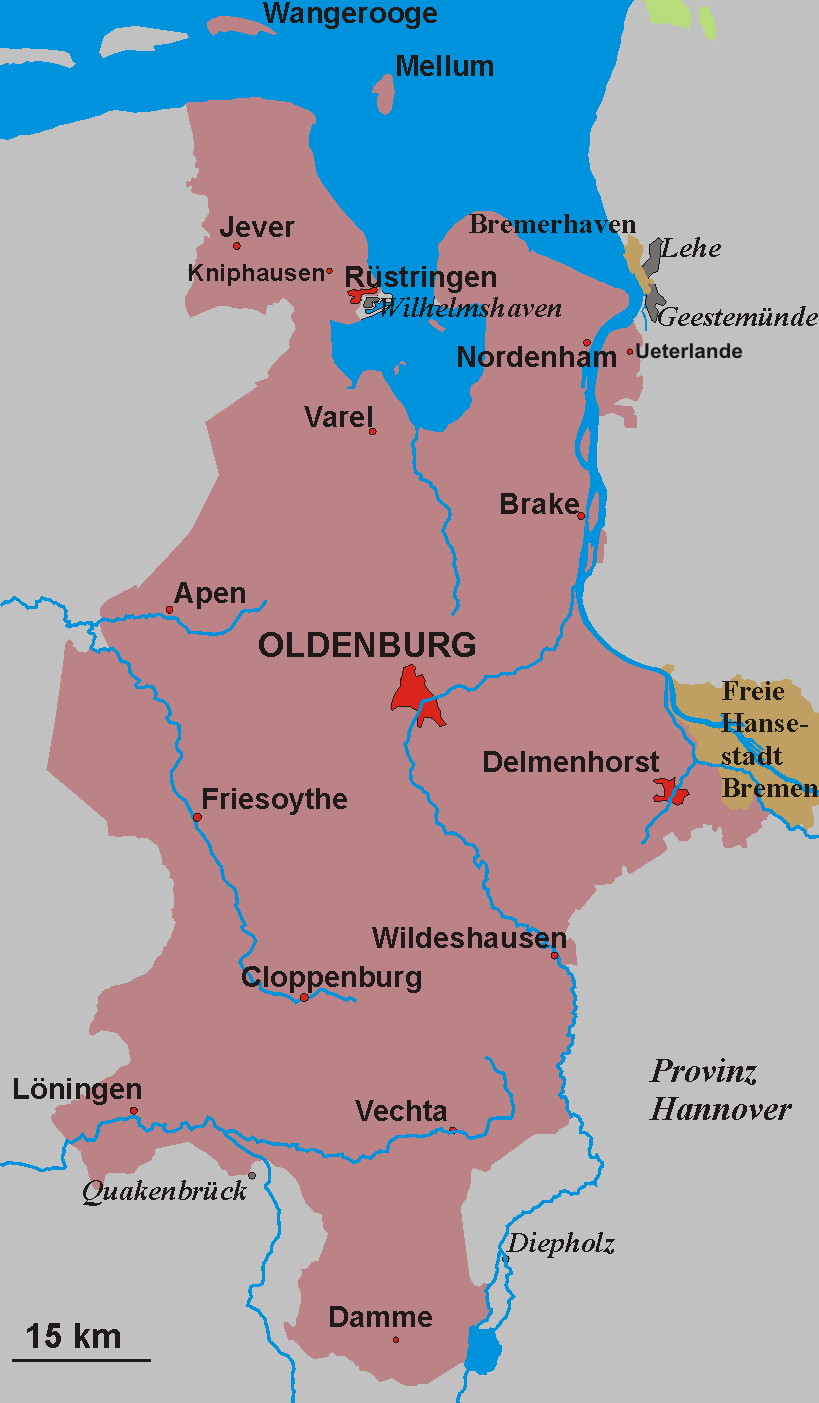
The Grand Duchy of Oldenburg bordered Bremen and the Kingdom of Hanover and included the islands of Wangerooge and Mellum

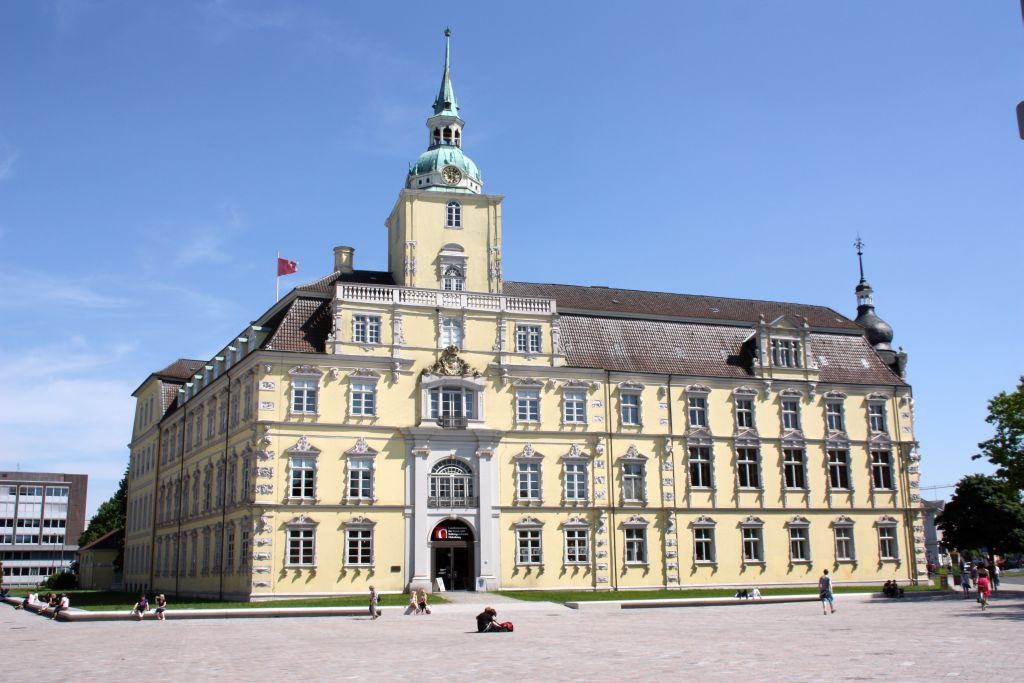
Oldenburg Palace in Oldenburg

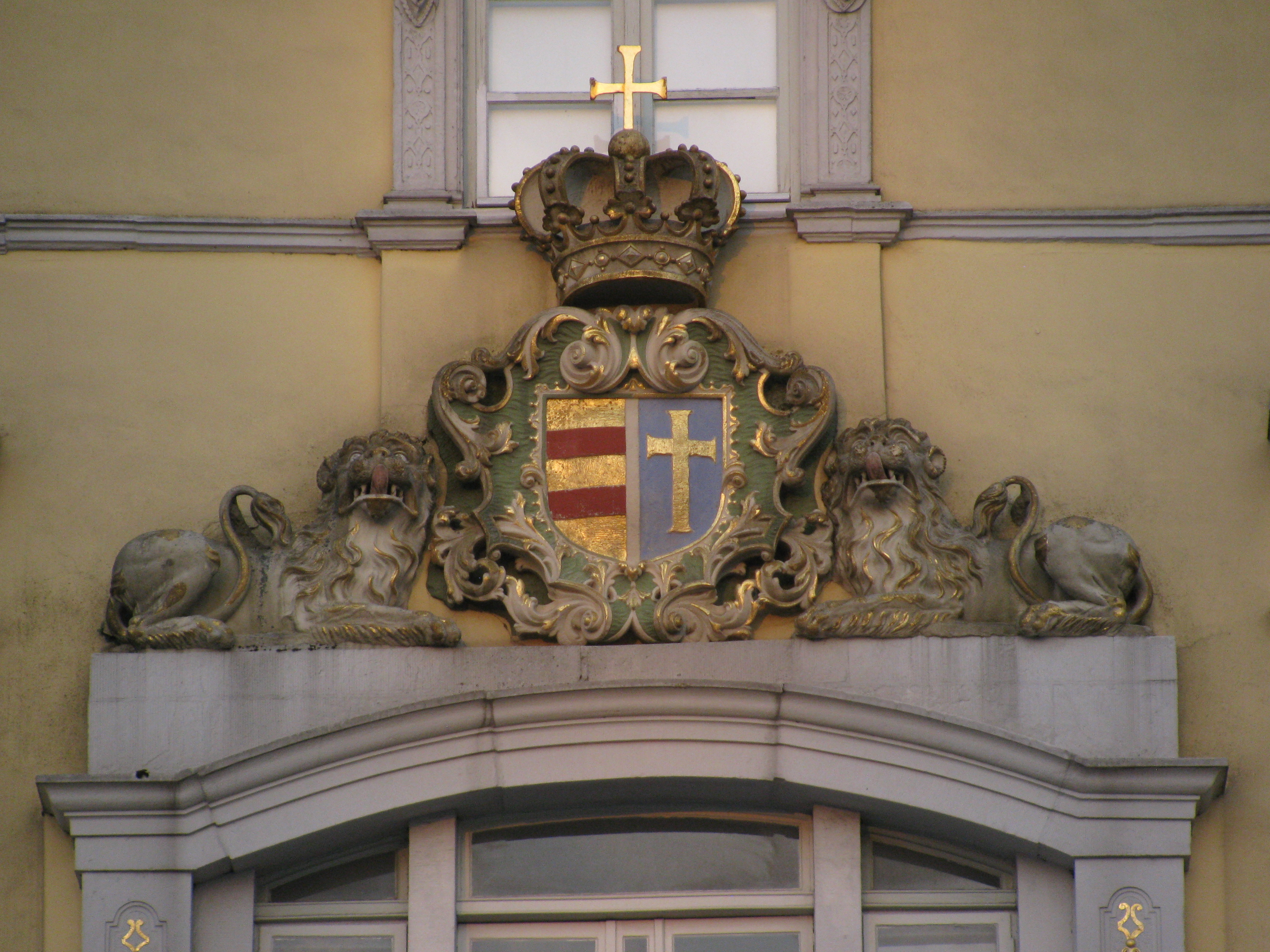
Coat of arms of the counts of Oldenburg at Oldenburg Palace: red stripes on gold for Oldenburg; golden cross on blue for Delmenhorst

== Prominent members ==
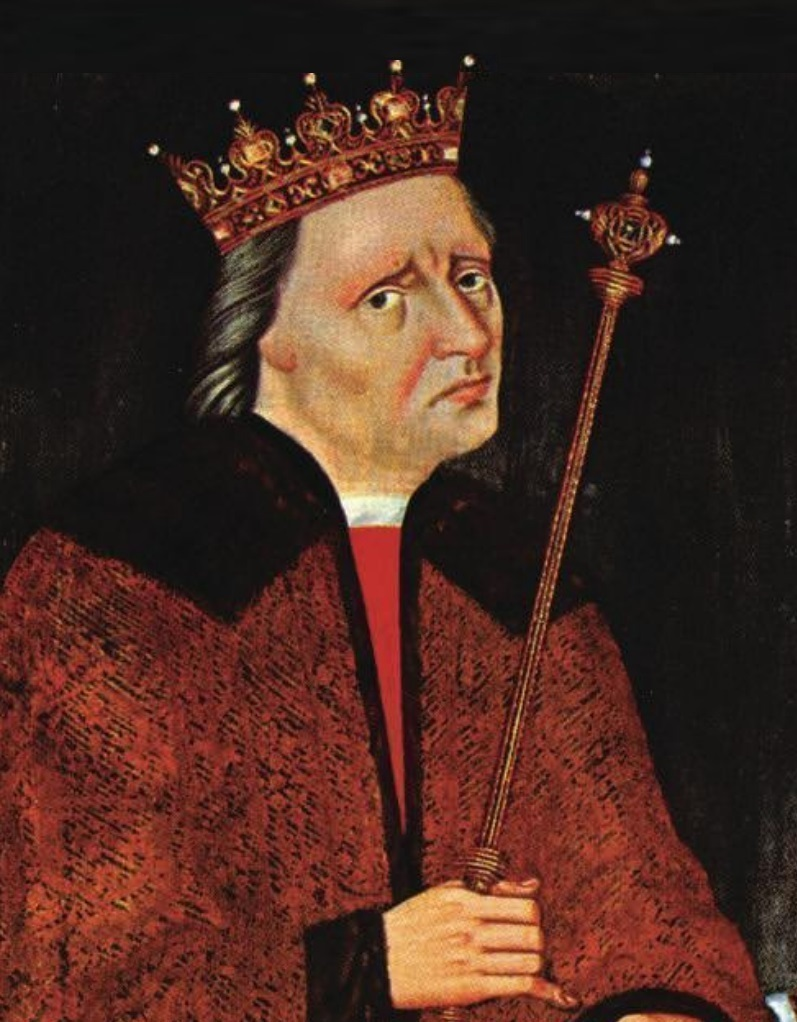
First Oldenburg king Christian I of Denmark, Norway and Sweden (1426–1481)

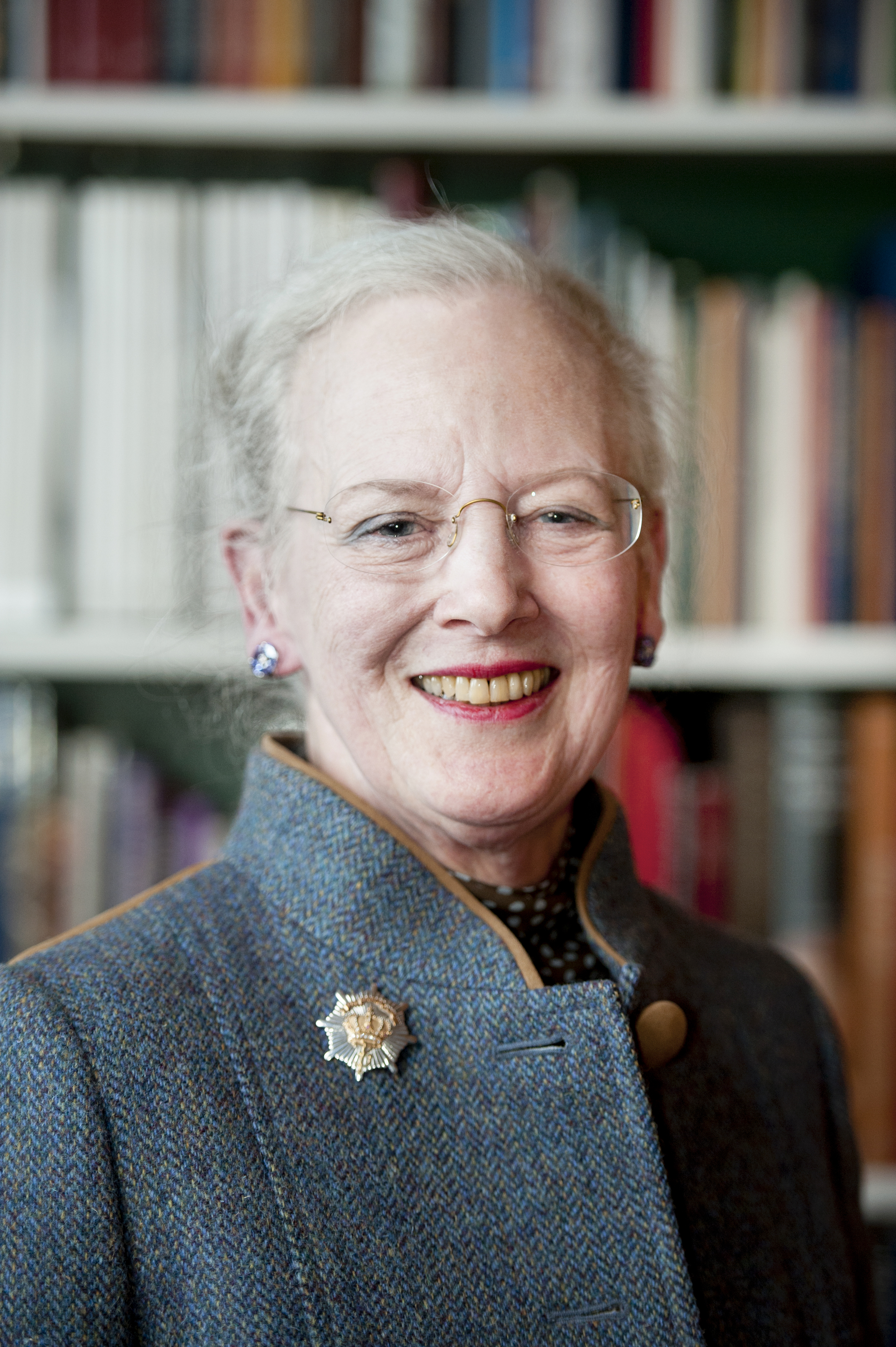
Queen Margrethe II of Denmark (b. 1940)

King Charles III of the United Kingdom (b. 1948)

King Haakon VIII of Norway (b. 1973)

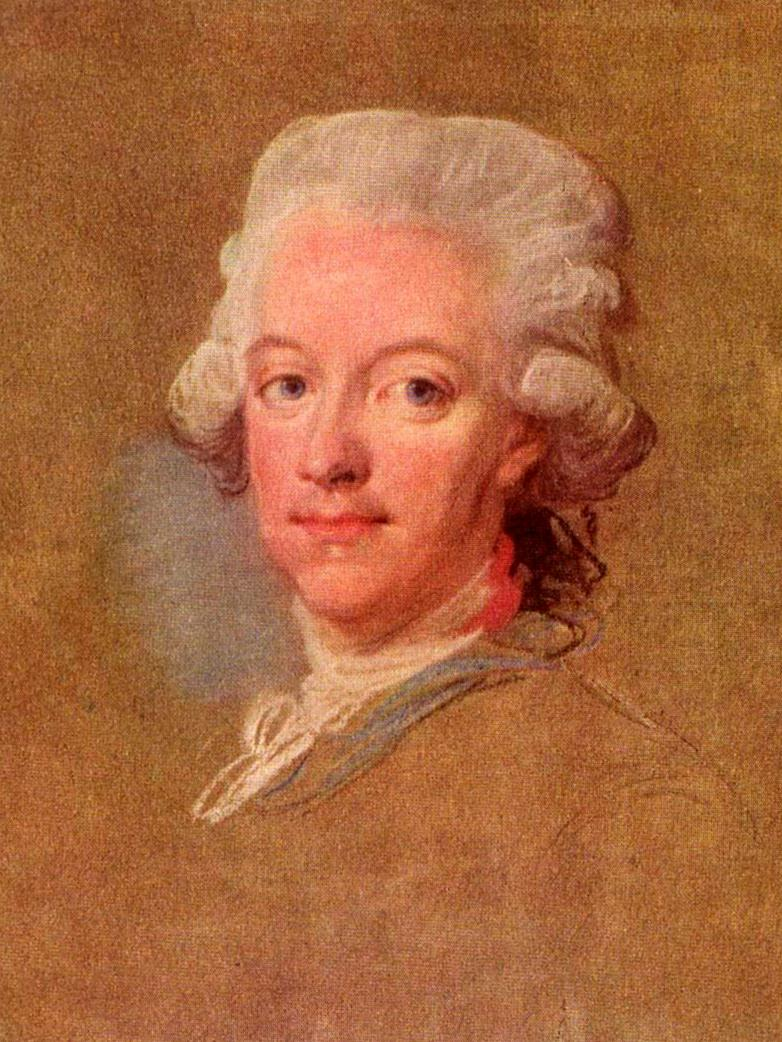
Sweden's most prominent Oldenburg king Gustav III (1746–1792)

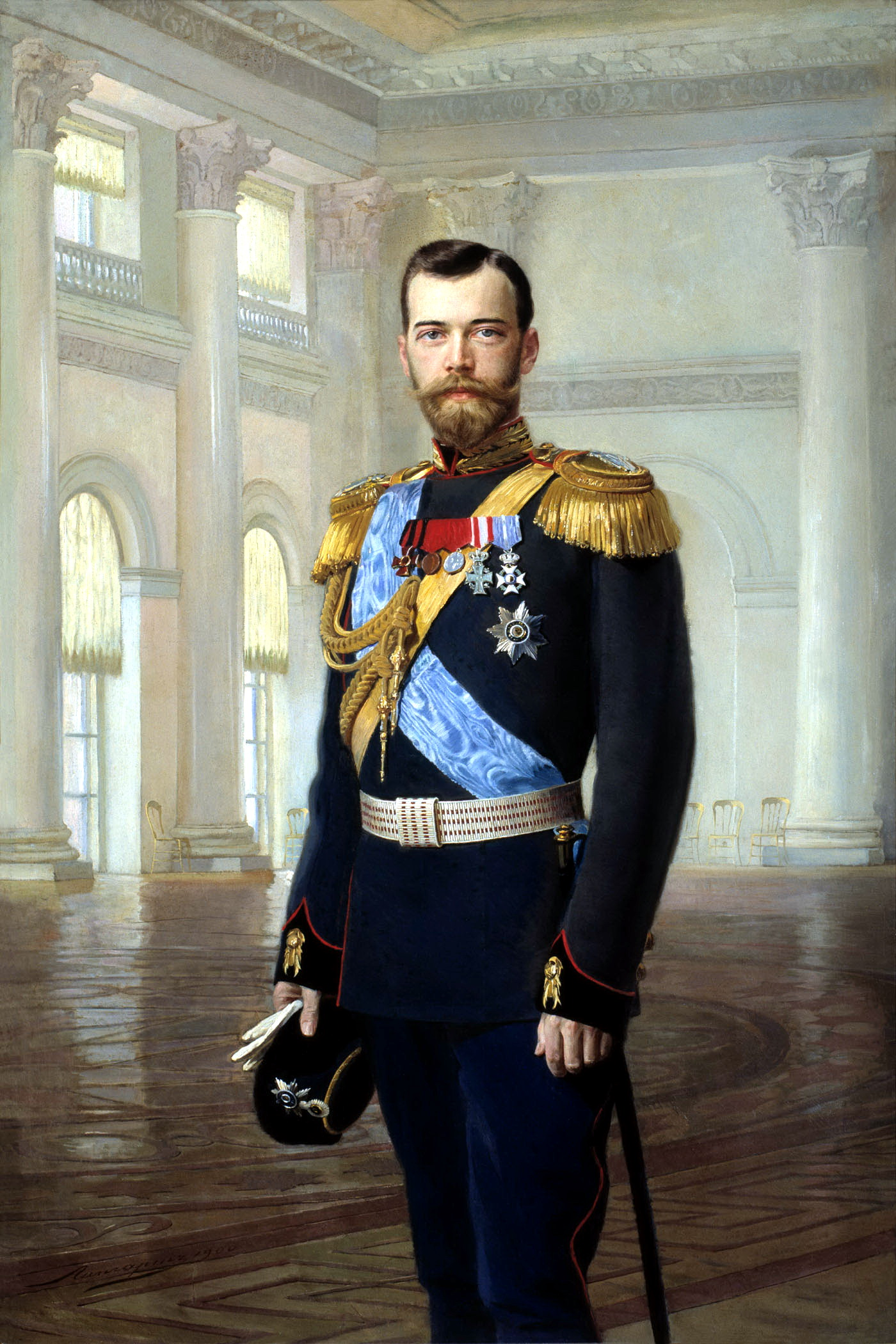
Nicholas II (1868–1918), last Emperor of Russia

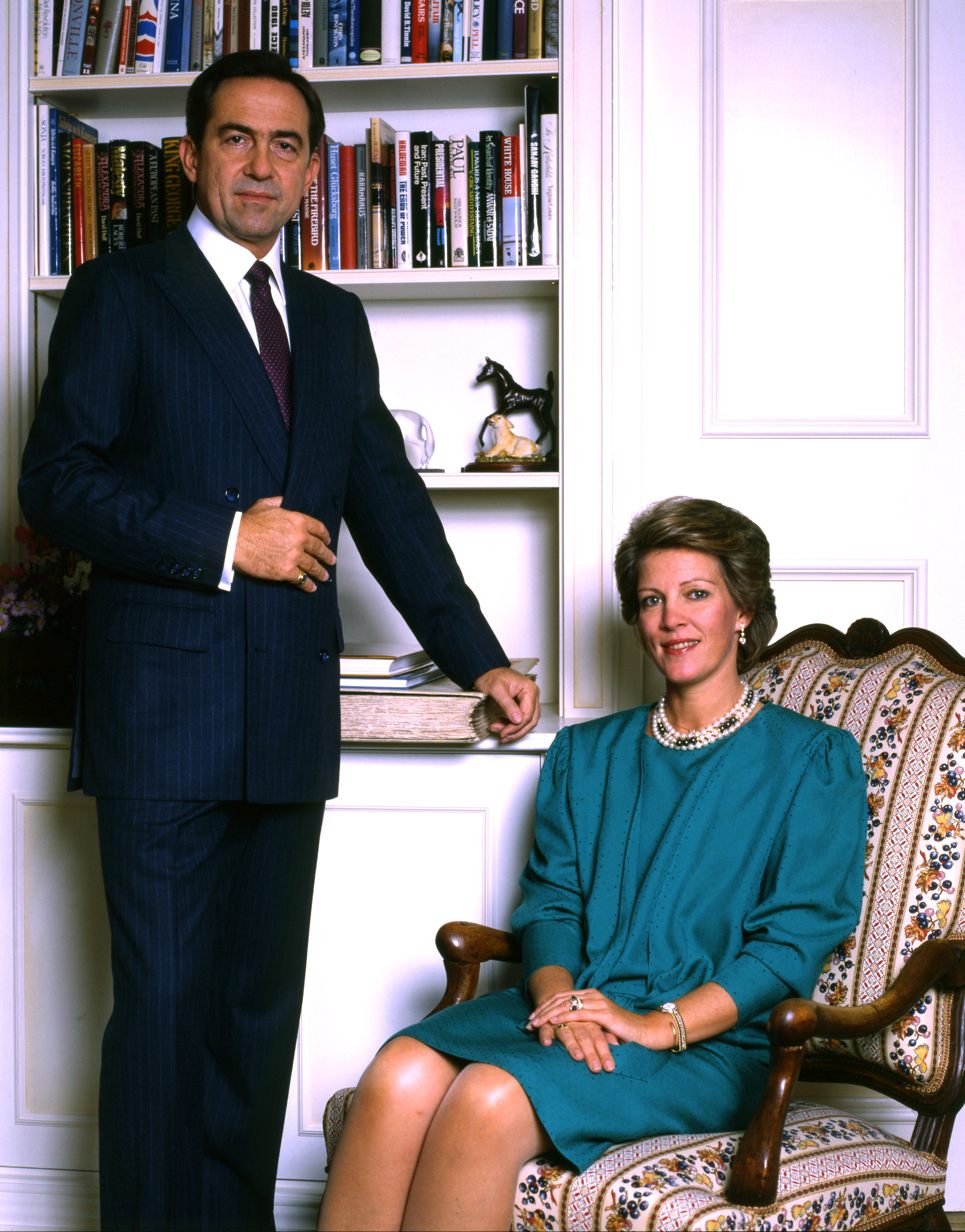
King Constantine II (1940–2023) and Queen Anne-Marie (b. 1946) of Greece, both Oldenburgs, she being a princess of Denmark

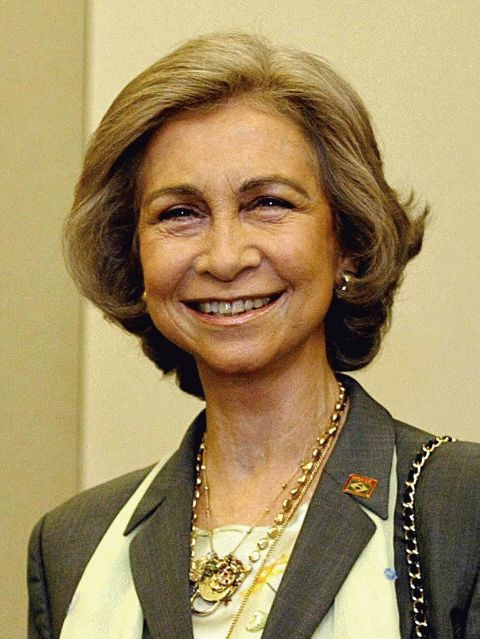
Queen Sofía of Spain, Princess of Greece and Denmark (b. 1938)

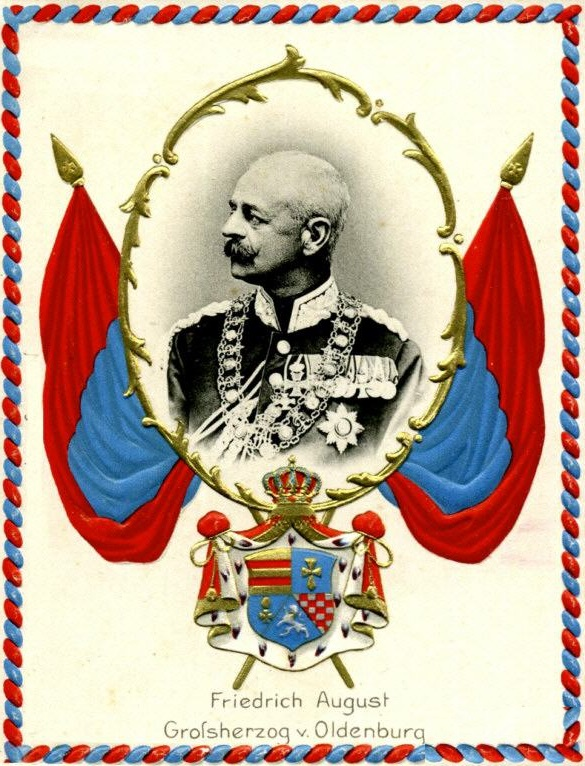
Frederick Augustus II (1852–1931), last ruling Grand Duke of Oldenburg

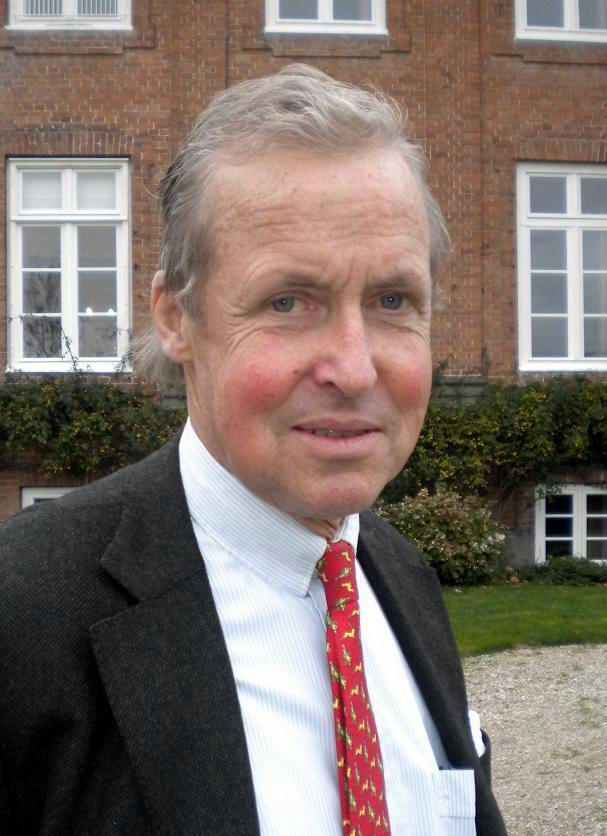
Christoph, Prince of Schleswig-Holstein (1949–2023), head of the House of Oldenburg for 43 years from 1980

== See also ==
- Counts, dukes and grand dukes of Oldenburg
- List of rulers of Schleswig-Holstein (contains more information about the partitions of Schleswig and Holstein)
- List of members of the House of Oldenburg (male descendants)
- Family tree of Oldenburg monarchs of Denmark
  - Oldenborg Dynasty Family Tree (in Czech)
- Genealogy of the House of Oldenburg from 1040 to the present day (in German)
- Schleswig-Holstein-Sonderburg, for the minor branches of the House of Oldenburg
- Coat of arms of Oldenburg
- Armorial of the House of Oldenburg (in French)

== Footnotes ==
House of Oldenburg
Preceded by House of Romanov	Imperial house of Russia; 1762–1917	Vacant February Revolution
Preceded by House of Wittelsbach	Royal house of Greece; 1863–1973	Monarchy abolished
Preceded by House of Palatinate-Neumarkt	Royal house of Denmark; 1448–present	Present house (branch: Glücksburg)
Preceded by House of Bernadotte	Royal house of Norway; 1905–present	Present house (branch: Glücksburg)
Vacant Title last held by House of Bonde	Royal house of Norway; 1450–1818	Succeeded by House of Bernadotte
Vacant Title last held by House of Bonde	Royal house of Sweden; 1457–1464	Vacant Title next held by House of Bonde
Vacant Title last held by House of Bonde	Royal house of Sweden; 1497–1501	Vacant
Vacant	Royal house of Sweden; 1520–1521	Vacant Title next held by House of Vasa
Preceded by House of Schaumburg	Comital House of Holstein; 1460–1474	County raised to duchy
Preceded by House of Schaumburg	Ducal house of Schleswig; 1474–1864	Second Schleswig War
County raised to duchy	Ducal House of Holstein; 1474–1864	Second Schleswig War
Vacant Title last held by House of Hanover	Ducal House of Saxe-Lauenburg; 1814–1864	Vacant Title next held by House of Hohenzollern
