= Hildebold of Wunstorf =

Prince-Archbishop of Bremen

Hildebold of Wunstorf (? - 11 October 1273), also Hildbold, was the Prince-Archbishop of Bremen from 1258 until his death.

== Life ==
He was a son of Hildebold II, Count of Wunstorf and Hedwig of Oldenburg, daughter of Maurice I. He was appointed as Domherr of Bremen in 1241 and, from 1250, as archdeacon of Rüstringen.

=== Bremen Diocesan Feud ===
Hildebold was elected following an ambivalent vote. The Bremen cathedral chapter at St. Peter's Cathedral in Bremen were overwhelmingly on his side, but the Hamburg Cathedral Chapter and several Bremen canons had voted for the dean (Dompropst), Gerhard von der Lippe, a great nephew of the deceased prince-archbishop, Gerhard II of Lippe. Gerhard had the support of his uncle, the Paderborn prince-bishop, Simon, who as coadjutor of Gebhard II had the castles of Langwedel and Vörde in his possession. Hildebold was able, however, with the aid of the ministeriales and for a payment of 800 marks, to gain ownership of both castles. Simon, with the help of the troops from Stedingen, advanced against Hildebold until he suffered a heavy defeat at the Battle of Munderloh against Hildebold who was militarily supported by his cousin John I, Count of Oldenburg. After Hildebold had succeeded in gaining the prince-archbishopric and the archdiocesan see, he immediately travelled to Rome where he was able to successfully prevail against his opposition. On 17 April 1259 he was ordained by Pope Alexander IV and given the Pallium.

=== Political activity ===
He became involved in a dispute with the city of Bremen over the construction of Versfleth Castle. The Bremen citizens accused him of wanting to use the castle to threaten the free movement of shipping on the Weser. The castle was captured by Bremen in 1262 and slighted. In a treaty on 14 August 1262, Hildebold had to guarantee Bremen that he would not have any more castles built between Bremen and the mouth of the Weser.

He also came into conflict with Hamburg after he awarded the town of Stade the right to charge tolls and staple rights. The dispute was decided in favour of Hamburg when a privilege was confirmed by Emperor Frederick I, that Hamburg's shipping could use the River Elbe without being charged tolls. Even his attempt to end the independence of Hamburg's cathedral chapter failed. Pope Clemens IV issued several decrees which confirmed the independence of the Hamburg cathedral chapter.

After the Wildeshausen line of the House of Oldenburg died out in 1270 Hildebold inherited the County of Wildeshausen, which, from then on, remained in the hands of Bremen.

== Death ==
Hildebold died on 11 October 1273 in Bremen and was buried in Bremen Cathedral. He was followed in office by Gilbert of Brunckhorst, a cousin on his mother's side.

== Literature ==
- Wilhelm von Bippen (1880). "Hildebold". Allgemeine Deutsche Biographie (in German). Vol. 12. Leipzig: Duncker & Humblot. pp. 398–399.
- Günter Glaeske (1972). "Hildebold". Neue Deutsche Biographie (in German). Vol. 9. Berlin: Duncker & Humblot. p. 119. (full text online).

Hildebold of Wunstorf House of Wunstorf Born: unknown Died: 3 November 1207 in Bremen
Regnal titles
Catholic Church titles
Preceded by Gebhard II	Prince-Archbishop of Hamburg-Bremen; 1258–1273	Vacant Title next held by Gilbert 1274–1306
