= Christian I of Oldenburg =

Count of Oldenburg from 1143 to 1167

Christian I, known as "the Quarrelsome" (died 1167), was Count of Oldenburg from 1143 to 1167. He was son of Elimar II, Count of Oldenburg and wife Eilika von Werl-Rietberg, daughter of Count Heinrich von Rietberg.

== Marriage and issue ==
He married Kunigunde and had two sons: Maurice, Count of Oldenburg (c. 1145 - c. 1211) and Christian the Crusader (de).

Christian I of Oldenburg House of Oldenburg
Regnal titles
Preceded by Elimar II	Count of Oldenburg; 1143–1167	Succeeded by Maurice
