= Christian II of Oldenburg =

German nobleman, Count of Oldenburg (died 1233)

Christian II
- Count of Oldenburg
- Died: 1233
- Noble family: House of Oldenburg
- Spouse: Agnes of Altena-Isenburg
- Issue: Otto of Oldenburg; John I, Count of Oldenburg
- Father: Maurice, Count of Oldenburg
- Mother: Salome of Wickerode

Christian II, Count of Oldenburg (died 1233) was a German nobleman. He was the ruling Count of Oldenburg from 1209 until his death.

== Life ==
He was a son of Maurice I of Oldenburg (died 1211) and his wife Salome of Wickerode.

After his father's death, he ruled jointly with his brother Otto I. They ruled harmoniously and managed significantly to expand the rights and territory of Oldenburg in Frisia.

Christian II managed to end the sovereignty of the Archbishopric of Bremen over Oldenburg; in return, he assisted Bremen against the rebellious farmers in Stedingen. He also fought many feuds against his liege lords, against his cousins, and against Hoya.

== Marriage and issue ==
He married Agnes, a daughter of Count Arnold of Altena-Isenburg with Mechtild of Holland and had two sons:

- Otto of Oldenburg (d. c. 1280), abbot in Bremen (de).
- John I, Count of Oldenburg-Delmenhorst

== See also ==
- List of rulers of Oldenburg

Christian II of Oldenburg House of Oldenburg Died: 1233
Regnal titles
Preceded by Maurice	Count of Oldenburg; 1209–1233 with his brother Otto I (1209–1251)	Succeeded by Otto I with John I
