= John I of Oldenburg =

13th century Count of Oldenburg

John I, Count of Oldenburg
- Born: c. 1210
- Died: c. 1270
- Noble family: House of Oldenburg
- Spouse: Richeza of Hoya-Stumpenhausen
- Issue Detail: Christian III, Count of Oldenburg
- Father: Christian II, Count of Oldenburg
- Mother: Agnes of Altena-Isenburg

John I, Count of Oldenburg (c. 1210 – c. 1270) was a ruling Count of Oldenburg from 1233 until his death.

== Life ==
His father, Christian II, had ruled jointly with his uncle, Otto I. After Christian II died in 1233, Otto I acted as guardian for the underage John I. When John I came of age, he ruled jointly with Otto I. After Otto I died in 1251, John I ruled alone.

In 1244, Otto I and John I together founded the Cistercian Rosenthal monastery in Menslage. In 1251, the monastery moved to a fort in the Börsteler Forest, which John I already owned.

In 1258 and 1259, he fought in the Bremen Prince-Archbishopric Feud on the side of his cousin Hildebold of Wunstorf against Rüstringen, Östringen and Stedingen. When the feud had ended, he kept the territories he had conquered.

After a dispute with the City of Bremen, he had to cede the castle in Berne. As a replacement, John I and his uncle built a castle in Delmenhorst, which provoked a strong reaction from Stedingen.

Like his predecessors, he had many disputes with his relatives, the Counts of Oldenburg-Wildeshausen. Ultimately, their county was divided between the bishops of Münster and Bremen. This resulted in Oldenburg and Delmenhorst being almost completely surrounded by these territories, and led to centuries of disputes between the Counts of Oldenburg and the two Prince-Bishops.

John I was a direct patrilineal ancestor of the British King Charles III and of many Kings of Denmark and Tsars of Russia.

== Marriage and issue ==
He married Richeza, a daughter of Count Henry II of Hoya, and had the following children:

- Heilwig, married Ekbert, Count of Bentheim-Tecklenburg (d. c. 1309/11)
- Christian III, Count of Oldenburg (c. 1250 – 1285)
- Maurice (d. 1319), priest in Wildeshausen
- Otto II (d. 1304)

== See also ==
- List of rulers of Oldenburg

== Footnotes ==
John I of Oldenburg House of Oldenburg Born: c. 1204 Died: c. 1270
Regnal titles
Preceded by Christian II with Otto I	Count of Oldenburg; 1233–1270 with his uncle Otto I (1209–1251)	Succeeded by Christian III
