= Maurice, Count of Oldenburg =

German noble (c. 1150–1211)

Maurice I (German: Moritz I.; c. 1150 – c. 1211) was Count of Oldenburg from 1169 through 1211. He was the son of Count Christian I of Oldenburg and his wife Kunigunde.

== Marriage and issue ==
He married Salome, the daughter of Otto II, Count of Wickrath, and had:

- Christian II, Count of Oldenburg 1211–1233
- Otto I, Count of Oldenburg 1209–1251
- Kunigunde of Oldenburg (married before 1230 to Giselbert III of Bronckhorst)

Maurice, Count of Oldenburg House of Oldenburg
Regnal titles
Preceded by Christian the Quarrelsome	Count of Oldenburg; 1169–1211	Succeeded by Christian II with Otto I
