= Counts, dukes and grand dukes of Oldenburg =

Monarchy of Oldenburg
- State

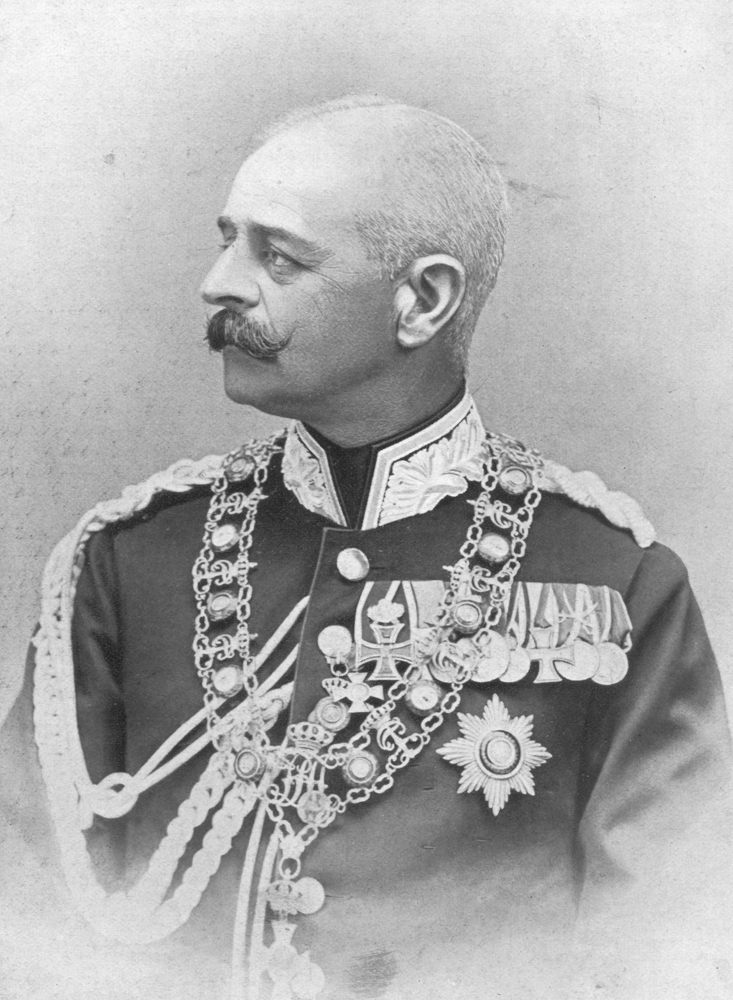

Details
- Style: His Royal Highness
- First monarch: Elimar I (As Count)
- Last monarch: Frederick Augustus II (As Grand Duke)
- Formed: 1101
- Abolished: 9 November 1918
- Residence: Rastede Castle
- Pretender: Christian

Shield of the Counts of Oldenburg

Shield of the Counts of Oldenburg-Delmenhorst

Shield of the Grand Dukes of Oldenburg

This is a list of the counts, dukes, grand dukes, and prime ministers of Oldenburg.

== Counts of Oldenburg ==
- 1088/1101–1108 Elimar I
- 1108–1143 Elimar II
- 1143–1168 Christian I the Quarrelsome
- 1168–1211 Maurice I
- 1209–1251 Otto I, joint rule with Christian II and later with John I
- 1211–1233 Christian II
- 1233–1272 John I
- 1272–1278 Christian III
- 1272–1301 Otto II, Count of Oldenburg-Delmenhorst
- 1278–1305 John II
- 1302–1323 Christian IV
- 1305–1345 John III
- 1331–1356 John IV
- 1345–1347 Conrad I
- 1368–1386 Conrad II
- 1386–1420 Maurice II
- 1368–1398 Christian V
- 1398–1423 Christian VI
- 1423–1440 Dietrich the Lucky
- 1440–1448 Christian VII
- 1448–1483 Gerhard VI "the Quarrelsome"
- 1483–1500 Adolph, Count of Oldenburg-Delmenhorst
- 1500–1526 John V
- 1526–1529 John VI, joint rule with his brothers George, Christopher and Anthony I, forced to resign in 1529
- 1526–1529 George, joint rule with his brothers John VI, Christopher and Anthony I, forced to resign in 1529
- 1526–1566 Christopher, joint rule with his brothers John VI, George and Anthony I
- 1526–1573 Anthony I, joint rule with his brothers John VI, George and Christopher
- 1573–1603 John VII
- 1573–1619 Anthony II, Count of Oldenburg-Delmenhorst
- 1603–1667 Anthony Günther
- 1667–1670 Frederick I, in personal union as Frederick III King of Denmark-Norway
- 1670–1699 Christian VIII, in personal union as Christian V King of Denmark-Norway
- 1699–1730 Frederick II, in personal union as Frederick IV King of Denmark-Norway
- 1730–1746 Christian IX, in personal union as Christian VI King of Denmark-Norway
- 1746–1766 Frederick III, in personal union as Frederick V King of Denmark-Norway
- 1766–1773 Christian X, in personal union as Christian VII King of Denmark-Norway, ceded the county to the Holstein-Gottorp line
- 1773 Paul I, ceded the county to his cousin of the Holstein-Gottorp line
- 1773–1774 Frederick Augustus I (elevated to Duke in 1774), in personal union Prince-Bishop of Lübeck

== Dukes of Oldenburg ==
Name	Portrait	Birth	Marriage(s)	Death
Frederick Augustus I 1774–6 July 1785		20 September 1711; Gottorp, Schleswig son of Christian August of Holstein-Gottorp and Albertina Frederica	Ulrike Friederike Wilhelmine of Hesse-Kassel; Kassel; 21 November 1752 three children	6 July 1785; Oldenburg aged 73
William I 1785–1810		3 January 1754; Eutin son of Frederick August I and Ulrike	Never married	2 July 1823; Schloss Plön aged 69

To France in 1810–1813

Name	Portrait	Birth	Marriage(s)	Death
William I 1813–1815		3 January 1754; Eutin son of Frederick Augustus I and Ulrike	Never married	2 July 1823; Schloss Plön aged 69

== Grand Dukes of Oldenburg ==
Name	Portrait	Birth	Marriage(s)	Death
William I 1815–2 July 1823		3 January 1754; Eutin son of Frederick Augustus I and Ulrike	Never married	2 July 1823; Schloss Plön aged 69
Peter I 1823–21 May 1829		17 January 1755; Rastede nephew of Frederick Augustus I and cousin of William	Frederica of Württemberg; 6 June 1781 two children	21 May 1829; Oldenburg aged 74
Augustus I 1829–27 February 1853		13 July 1783; Rastede son of Peter I and Friederike	Adelheid of Anhalt-Bernburg-Schaumburg-Hoym; 24 July 1817 two children Ida of Anhalt-Bernburg-Schaumburg-Hoym; 24 June 1825 one child Cecilia of Sweden; 5 May 1831 three children	27 February 1853; Oldenburg aged 69
Peter II; 1853–13 June 1900		8 July 1827; Oldenburg son of Augustus I and Ida	Elisabeth of Saxe-Altenburg; 10 February 1852 two children	13 June 1900; Rastede aged 72
Frederick Augustus II; 1900–11 November 1918		16 November 1852; Oldenburg son of Peter II and Elisabeth	Elisabeth Anna of Prussia; 18 February 1878 two children Elisabeth of Mecklenburg-Schwerin; 24 October 1896; 5 children	24 February 1931; Rastede aged 78

== Full style ==
- Grand Duke of Oldenburg, Heir in Norway, Duke of Schleswig, Holstein, Stormarn, Ditmarshes & Oldenburg, Prince of Lübeck and Birkenfeld, Lord of Jever and Kniphausen

== Prime ministers of the Republic of Oldenburg ==
- 1918–1919 Bernhard Kuhnt (USPD)
- 1919–1923 Theodor Tantzen (DDP)
- 1923–1930 Eugen von Finckh (no party)
- 1930–1932 Friedrich Cassebohm
- 1932–1933 Carl Röver (NSDAP)
- 1933–1945 Georg Joel (NSDAP)
- 1945–1946 Theodor Tantzen (FDP)

To Lower Saxony in 1946

== See also ==
- List of consorts of Oldenburg
