= Count Oluf of Rosenborg =

Danish noble (1923–1990)

Count Oluf
- Born: His Royal Highness Prince Oluf Christian Carl Axel of Denmark; 10 March 1923; Copenhagen, Denmark
- Died: 19 December 1990 (aged 67); Copenhagen, Denmark
- Spouse: Dorrit Puggaard-Müller (m. 1948, div. 1977); Lis Wulff-Juergensen (m. 1982, div. 1983)
- Issue: Count Ulrik Harald; Countess Charlotte, Mrs. Wulff
Names
- Oluf Christian Carl Axel
- House: Glücksburg
- Father: Prince Harald of Denmark
- Mother: Princess Helena of Schleswig-Holstein-Sonderburg-Glücksburg

Count Oluf of Rosenborg (Oluf Christian Carl Axel; 10 March 1923 – 19 December 1990), a former Danish prince, was the youngest child and son of Prince Harald of Denmark by his wife, Princess Helena of Schleswig-Holstein-Sonderburg-Glücksburg.

== Early life ==
Oluf is a Danish form of Olaf.

He gained the rank of Wing Commander in the Royal Danish Air Force and was appointed a Knight of the Order of the Elephant of Denmark.

Oluf renounced his rights to the throne and took the title Count of Rosenborg on 13 January 1948 when he married Annie Helene Dorrit Puggaard-Müller (Copenhagen, 8 September 1926 - 14 May 2013) in Copenhagen on 4 February 1948, daughter of Gunnar Puggaard-Müller (Frederiksberg, Copenhagen, 9 July 1889 - Bybjerggaard, Hundested, 21 May 1983), Cand.jur., Head of Office in the Ministry of Finance in Bybjerggaard, Kikhavn, Hundested, and wife (m. 12 April 1921) Gerda Annie Nielsen (Copenhagen, 26 July 1899 - ?), paternal granddaughter of Johan Sophus Müller (Flensborggaard, Glumsø S., 4 August 1857 - 13 May 1934, buried in Ordrup Kirkegård in 1934), cand. theol., parish priest, and wife (m. Copenhagen, 17 June 1885) Alice Helene Puggaard (Sverige, Halland, Falkenberg, Hjuleberg, 13 January 1858 - July 1913, buried in Ordrup Kirkegård on 3 August 1913) and maternal granddaughter of Louis Nielsen (Korsør, 8 March 1865 - 1936), Major-General in the Royal Danish Army in Copenhagen, and wife (m. 1889) Anny Jordan. They had two children and divorced on 20 January 1977. He married secondly Lis Wulff-Juergensen (b. Frederiksborg, 30 June 1935) in 1982, they divorced in 1983, without issue.

Oluf and his first wife had two children:

- Ulrik Harald Gunnar Oluf, Count of Rosenborg (b. Copenhagen, 17 December 1950), Director in Lyngby, married firstly Tove Waigner-Larsen (Copenhagen, 14 December 1950 - Copenhagen, 23 April 2010), daughter of Axel Waigner-Larsen and wife Karen Dorothea Nielsen, in Copenhagen on 4 April 1981. They have two children. He married secondly Mrs. Judith Sandwick on 26 May 2012.
  - Katharina Dorthea Helene, Countess of Rosenborg (b. Hvidovre, 1 May 1981).
  - Philip Oluf Axel Ulrik, Count of Rosenborg (b. Hvidovre or Gentofte, 8 May 1986), married Mette Kragh in 2024.
- Charlotte Helene Annie Dorrit, Countess of Rosenborg (b. Ordrup, 11 April 1953), married firstly Jens Philipsen on 12 November 1977. They divorced in 1978 without issue. She married secondly Torben Wulff af Gyldenfeldt (b. Solbjerg, 15 September 1954) at Lyngby on 11 April 1981. They have two children:
  - Johan Henrik Oluf Torben Wulff (b. 17 July 1980).
  - Beate Inge Dorrit Charlotte Wulff (b. 17 January 1983).

== Ancestry ==
Ancestors of Count Oluf of Rosenborg

8. Christian IX of Denmark
4. Frederick VIII of Denmark
9. Princess Louise of Hesse-Kassel
2. Prince Harald of Denmark
10. Charles XV of Sweden
5. Princess Louise of Sweden
11. Princess Louise of the Netherlands
1. Prince Oluf of Denmark
12. Friedrich, Duke of Schleswig-Holstein-Sonderburg-Glücksburg
6. Friedrich Ferdinand, Duke of Schleswig-Holstein
13. Princess Adelheid of Schaumburg-Lippe
3. Princess Helena of Schleswig-Holstein-Sonderburg-Glücksburg
14. Frederick VIII, Duke of Schleswig-Holstein
7. Princess Karoline Mathilde of Schleswig-Holstein-Sonderburg-Augustenburg
15. Princess Adelheid of Hohenlohe-Langenburg
