= Elimar I of Oldenburg =

Count of Oldenburg from 1091 to 1108

Elimar I

Count of Oldenburg
- Reign: c. 1091-1108
- Successor: Elimar II, Count of Oldenburg
- Born: c. 1060
- Died: 1112
- Noble family: House of Oldenburg
- Spouse: Richenza
- Issue: Christian; Elimar II, Count of Oldenburg; Gertrud

Egilmar I (c. 1060–1112) was the first Count of Oldenburg and thus founder of the House of Oldenburg. He reigned from c. 1091 to 1108.

== History ==
Count Egilmar I is mentioned for the first time as a witness in a document from Archbishop Liemar of Hamburg-Bremen, which is dated 1091. The document refers to a court hearing that had probably taken place a few years earlier and in which Egilmar is mentioned as "still growing up at the time". According to another document from 1108, Count Egilmar I was accepted into the prayer society of the Iburg monastery in exchange for a membership fee of 90 bunch eels to be picked up at Aldenburg (lat. "apud Aldenburch"). This is the first mention of Schloss Oldenburg ("the old castle"), the ancestral seat of the family. In this document, which was probably written by his own brother, Egilmar I is titled as "comes in confinio Saxonie et Frisie potens et manens", i.e. as a powerful count living on the border between Saxony and Friesland.

Numerous family members of Count Egilmar I emerge from the document from 1108. Present were his wife Riche(n)za, his sons Christian and Egilmar II, his daughter Gertrud and his brother, the cleric Giselbert.

Elimar's wife Richenza (also called Rikissa or Rixa) was the daughter of Dedi or Adalger, according to the Annals of Stade, and according to the same source, her mother was Ida of Elthorp (the Annales Stadenses also record that "Rikencen, filie Ide de Elthrope" was the wife of "comes Eilmari de Aldenburg"). According to Albert of Stade, Ida of Elthorp was the "niece of an emperor and a pope". It was argued that Ida's father was the brother of Emperor Henry III and Ida's mother was the sister of Pope Leo IX (whose secular name was Bruno). However, the exact assignment is a puzzle that has occupied genealogists for more than 100 years. The same applies to Richenza's father, since her mother was married three times. Her father Dedi or Dedo was probably not a contemporaneous count of Dithmarschen of that name, but the Saxon Count Palatine Dedi of Goseck, who was murdered in 1056. Richenza would then have been a niece of his brother Archbishop Adalbert of Bremen (1043–1072), the archdiocese to which Oldenburg belonged, which would have favored the rise of her husband and descendants.

The name of Elimar is found in a charter dating from 1108. His wife claimed that he was descended from Wittekind, a notable defender of the Saxons and the chief opponent of Charlemagne during the Saxon Wars of 777 to 785, but there is no further evidence for this.

Elimar and Rixa had three children, including Elimar II, who succeeded him as Count of Oldenburg.

Elimar I is the earliest known direct male ancestor of King Charles III, King Haakon VIII of Norway, and Pavlos, Crown Prince of Greece.

== Sources ==
- Ǿstergård, Uffe (2015). "Nation-Building and Nationalism in the Oldenburg Empire". In Berger, Stefan; Miller, Alexei (eds.). Nationalizing Empires. Central European University Press. pp. 461–510.
- Hans Friedl et al. (editors): Biographisches Handbuch zur Geschichte des Landes Oldenburg. (Biographical handbook on the history of the state of Oldenburg), publisher: Isensee-Verlag, Oldenburg 1992, p. 166, 338, ISBN 3-89442-135-5.
- Bernd Ulrich Hucker: Brudermord im Hause Oldenburg – Kampf um Herrschaft und Macht im 12. Jahrhundert, in: Die frühen Oldenburger Grafen (Fratricide in the house of Oldenburg - struggle for rule and power in the 12th century, in: The early Oldenburg counts), p. 47–64, with comprehensive references to older literature, pp. 64–68. Publisher: Isensee-Verlag, Oldenburg 2008, ISBN 978-3-89995-534-7.
- Dieter Riemer: Graf Huno auf der Spur. In: Die frühen Oldenburger Grafen. (On the Trail of Count Huno, in: The Early Oldenburg Counts.), p. 6–46. Isensee-Verlag, Oldenburg 2008, ISBN 978-3-89995-534-7.
- Dieter Riemer: Grafen und Herren im Erzstift Bremen im Spiegel der Geschichte Lehes. (Counts and lords in the archbishopric of Bremen reflected in the history of Lehe.), dissertation phil. Oldenburg, publisher: W. Mauke Söhne, Hamburg-Bremerhaven 1995, ISBN 3-923-725-89-2

Elimar I of Oldenburg House of Oldenburg
Regnal titles
New title	Count of Oldenburg; 1091–1108	Succeeded by Elimar II
