= Elimar II of Oldenburg =

Count of Oldenburg (1108 to 1142)

Elimar II

Count of Oldenburg
- Reign: c. 1108-1142
- Predecessor: Elimar I, Count of Oldenburg
- Successor: Christian I, Count of Oldenburg
- Noble family: House of Oldenburg
- Spouse: Eilika of Werl-Rietberg
- Issue: Christian I, Count of Oldenburg Eilika of Oldenburg
- Father: Elimar I, Count of Oldenburg

Elimar II (also Egilmar) was Count of Oldenburg from 1108 through 1142. He was the son of Elimar I, Count of Oldenburg and his wife Richenza.

== Marriage and issue ==
Elimar married before 1102 Eilika of Werl-Rietberg, daughter of Henry, Count of Rietberg, and had:

- Henry I, Count of Oldenburg (de)
- Christian I, Count of Oldenburg
- Eilika of Oldenburg (ca. 1120 -) married Henry I, Count of Tecklenburg

Elimar II of Oldenburg House of Oldenburg
Regnal titles
Preceded by Elimar I	Count of Oldenburg; 1108–1142	Succeeded by Christian I, the Quarrelsome
