= Amalia of Oldenburg =

Queen of Greece from 1836 to 1862

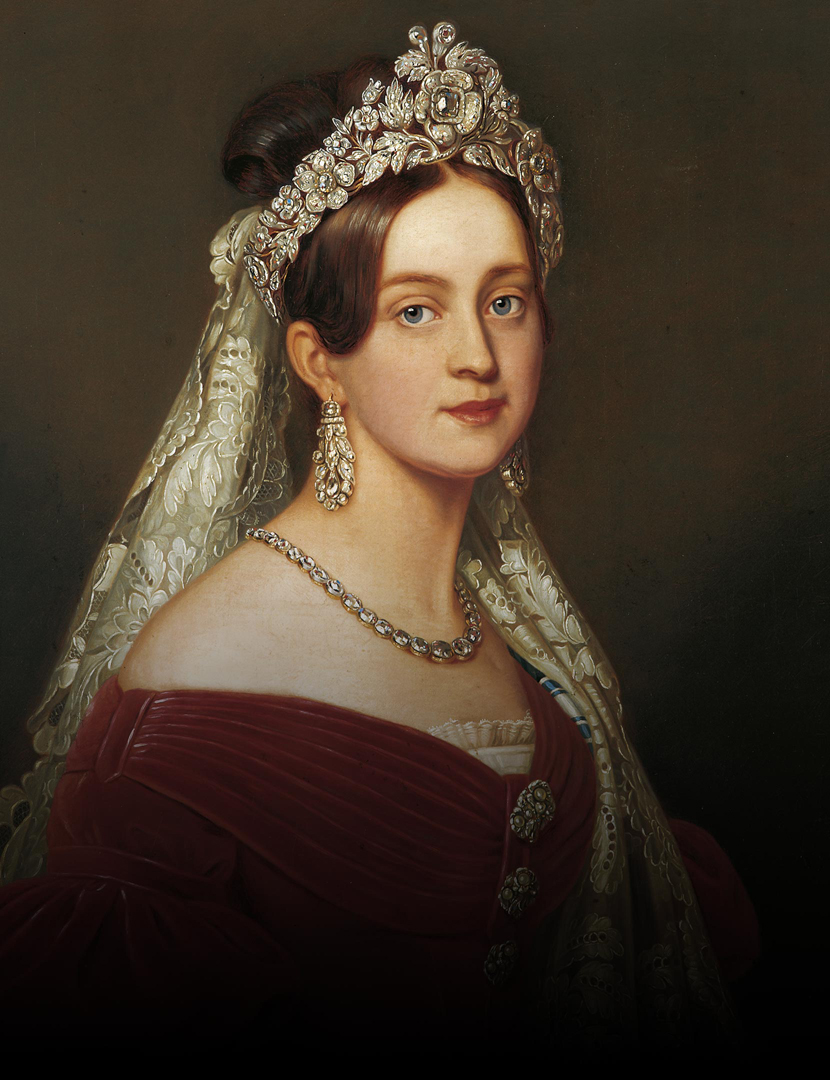

Queen consort of Greece
- Tenure: 22 December 1836 – 24 October 1862
- Born: 21 December 1818; Oldenburg, Grand Duchy of Oldenburg
- Died: 20 May 1875 (aged 56); Bamberg, Kingdom of Bavaria
- Burial: Theatinerkirche (Munich)
- Spouse: Otto of Greece (m. 1836; died 1867)
Names
- German: Amalie Marie Friederike; Greek: Αμαλία Μαρία Φρειδερίκη
- House: Holstein-Gottorp
- Father: Augustus, Grand Duke of Oldenburg
- Mother: Princess Adelheid of Anhalt-Bernburg-Schaumburg-Hoym

Styles of Queen Amalia of Greece
- Reference style: Her Majesty
- Spoken style: Your Majesty

Amalia of Oldenburg (Greek: Αμαλία; 21 December 1818 – 20 May 1875) was a Oldenburg princess who became Queen of Greece from 1836 to 1862 as the wife of King Otto Friedrich Ludwig. During her tenure as queen, she was dedicated to social improvement and the founding of many gardens in Athens, and she was the first to introduce the Christmas tree to Greece.

She became the target of harsh attacks and her image suffered further as she proved unable to provide an heir to the throne. She and her husband were expelled from Greece in 1862, after an uprising. She spent the rest of her years in exile in Bavaria.

She acted as Regent of Greece in 1850–1851, and a second time in 1861–1862 during the absence of Otto.

To Amalia is attributed the creation of the "romantic folksy court dress," which became Greece's national costume.

== Early life and marriage ==
=== Early years and family life ===
Duchess Amalia Maria Frederica was born on 21 December 1818 in Oldenburg to Duke Paul Frederick Augustus of Oldenburg and his wife Princess Adelheid of Anhalt-Bernburg-Schaumburg-Hoym as their first child. She was less than two years old when her mother died, on 13 September 1820. Her father remarried in 1825 to Princess Ida of Anhalt-Bernburg-Schaumburg-Hoym, though she soon died in 1828; his last marriage was with Princess Cecilia of Sweden in 1831.

Due to her father's marriages, Amalia had five siblings, four being born as half-brothers: Duchess Frederica, Grand Duke Peter II, Duke Alexander, Duke August, and Duke Elimar.

=== Marriage ===
On 22 December 1836, Duchess Amalia of Oldenburg married King Otto Friedrich Ludwig in Oldenburg. Born as the second son of King Ludwig I of Bavaria, Prince Otto of Bavaria had been appointed king of the newly created Kingdom of Greece in 1833. Otto visited Germany to find a bride after he had been declared to be of legal majority. He then met Amalia in Marienbad in Bohemia.

Amalia was Lutheran and Otto was Catholic, and they were wed in both a Lutheran and Catholic wedding ceremony. It was an understanding, that while they were allowed to keep their religion, any child born to them would be raised in the Orthodox religion of Greece. On 14 February 1837 she arrived in Athens, in Greece.

== Queen of Greece ==
In the early years of the new monarchy, Queen Amalia brought progress to the impoverished country. She worked actively towards social improvement and the creation of many gardens in Athens, and she gained respect from the Greek Populus through her displays of patriotism. Queen Amalia was the first to introduce the Christmas tree to Greece.

During her first years in Greece, Athens was a relatively small town; the king and queen resided in a small house while the Old Royal Palace was being built. Having few exceptions, the Royal Household was made up of mostly Germans. The queen's chamberlain and principal lady-in-waiting were the German couple Clemens von Weichs-Glon and Dorothea von Weichs-Glon, her favourite companion being Julie von Nordenpflycht. The queen's sister, Princess Frederike, lived with her in Greece for several years until she left after the September revolution of 1843.

The diarist Christiane Lüth described the queen in 1839–40:

The Queen was small, beautiful and with a lovely figure. She was lively, almost too lively, spoke of various subjects and complimented Greece in favor of the Nordic countries, and was certain that we would very soon be accustomed to this beautiful nation with its lovely climate. [...] The Queen was very superstitious, she did not sit down thirteen people at dinner, and was convinced that a white or a black lady appeared before her when an event of importance occurred in Bavaria or Oldenburg. She also believed in reincarnation, and her firm character made it hard to dissuade her from something once she had made up her mind.

Christiane Lüth describes the court in Athens as a small community full of gossip: "The least pleasant thing was that there was always a German lackey on the servant seat who heard every word said; for the entire court staff was with few exceptions German. There was endless gossip, as the Queen felt an interest for the least important things, so that everything which could be forwarded to her by lackeys, lady's maids and chamber maids was "gefundenes fressen" (fig. "low hanging fruit") and that the queen was a "master" of gossip.

Queen Amalia loved to dance and ride, arranged balls at court and could be seen riding in and around Athens, and in other leisure activities which was common for upper-class women in Western Europe but new in Greece, where women had normally lived in seclusion during the Ottoman Empire.

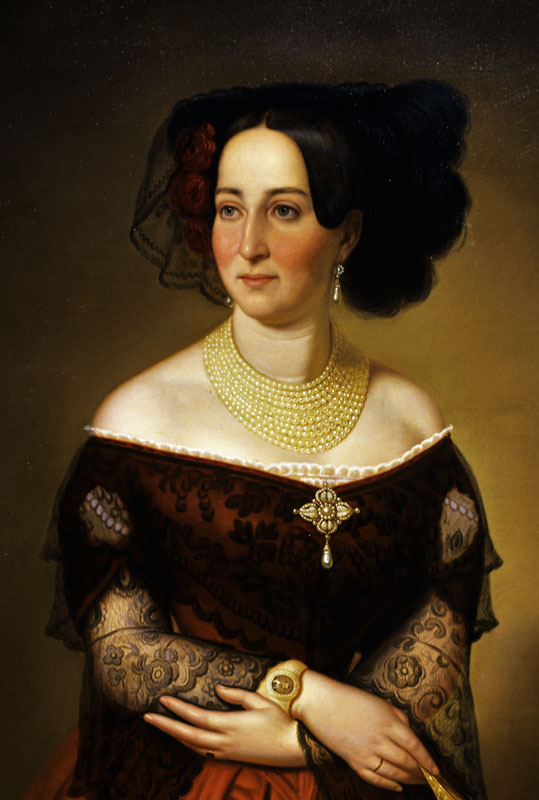
A portrait of Queen Amalia of Greece in 1859: Spyridon Hatzigiannopoulos

=== Succession crisis and political activity ===
As King Otto and his Bavarian advisers became more enmeshed in political struggles with Greek political forces, the queen became more politically involved, also. She became the target of harsh attacks when she became involved in politics. She remained a Protestant in an almost universally Orthodox country throughout her husband's reign.

Christiane Lüth describes the role of the queen during the 3 September 1843 Revolution:

Uhlan continually circled around the [p]alace on horseback, to ensure that no one escaped, and all of the military stood in a threatening position ready to fire on command. Thousands of people filled the great square and you could hear them call: "Live the Constitution!" [...] The Queen was with the King all the time and told him, that there was but two alternatives: entweder underschreiben oder entsagen (either sign or abdicate).

Lüth described the queen as nervous and pessimistic during the days following the revolution. She did not wish to hear sermon and had her books packed ready to leave if necessary, and advised her sister Princess Friederike to leave Greece since she could no longer guarantee her safety. The king and queen wrote to King Louis of Bavaria to ask for his assistance, but the queen remarked that they could not expect a response for six weeks, and by that time „und Gott weiss wo wir dann sind“ ['God knows how things stand']. On the queen's name day no ball was given at the Palace: "... it was not seen wise, one would not risk having a Gustav III Masquerade. There are daily rumours that Athens will be set alight on all four corners, so to speak, and everyone massacered."

Initially, Queen Amalia's Lutheran religion was not given much attention, but the aversion to it grew when she did not give birth to a child which could be raised Orthodox. One of the biggest crises of Otto's reign, as well as Amalia's unpopularity, was the succession crisis. The cause of the childlessness of Otto and Amalia has been the cause of debate. During this time period, infertility was commonly considered the fault of the woman, and Amalia's frequent dancing and riding were blamed for it. She was exposed to various fertility treatments until her 35th birthday. Otto's brothers were given the right to the throne after him, but it was rumoured that queen Amalia wished to have her own half-brother Elimar of Oldenburg appointed heir instead.

The queen was eventually given more influence. Amalia was given the right to govern as regent in the case of the absence or incapability of the monarch or the heir to the throne. She acted as Regent of Greece in 1850-1851 when Otto was in Germany for health reasons, and a second time in 1861–1862, when Otto visited his family in Bavaria to discuss the succession crisis.

Her political influence was controversial. Her favorites were considered to have influence over her, notably her principal lady-in-waiting Baroness Wilhelmine von Plüskow was widely rumored to influence state affairs, particularly in matters relating to Austria, through both the queen and the king, which exposed her to controversy.

=== Fashion influence ===
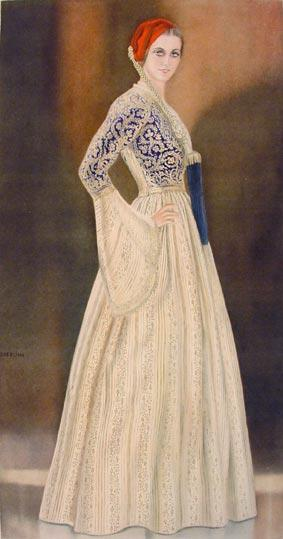
Type of Amalia dress

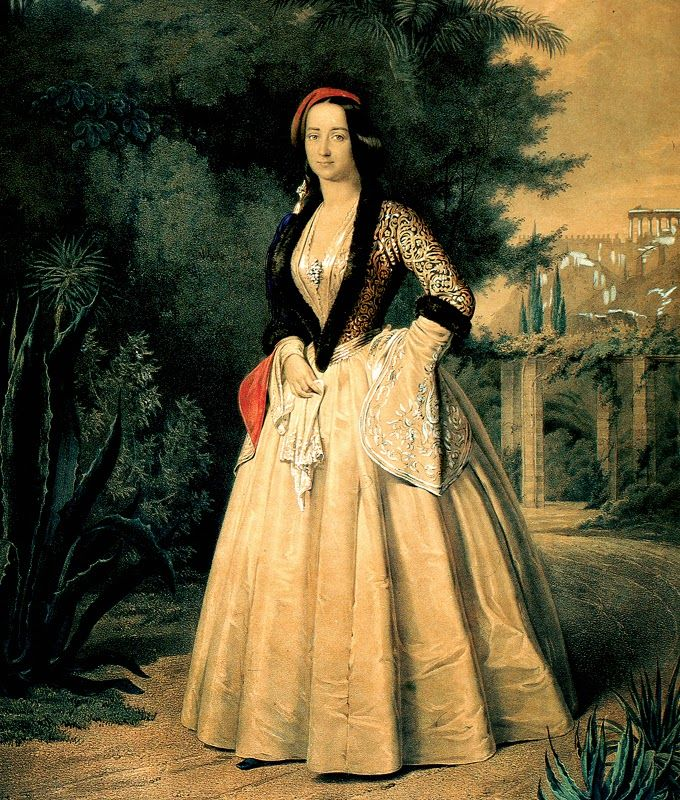
Amalia wearing Amalia dress

When she arrived in Greece as a queen in 1837, she had an immediate impact on social life and fashion. She realised that her attire ought to emulate that of her new people, and so she created a romantic folksy court dress, which became a national Greek costume still known as the Amalía dress.

It follows the Biedermeier style with a loose-fitting, white cotton or silk shirt, often decorated with lace at the neck and cuffs, over which a richly embroidered jacket or vest is worn, usually of dark blue or claret velvet. The skirt was ankle-length, unpressed-pleated silk, the color usually azure. It was completed with a soft cap or fez with a single, long, golden silk tassel, traditionally worn by married women, or with the kalpaki (a toque) of the unmarried woman, and sometimes with a black veil for church. This dress became the usual attire of all Christian townswomen in both Ottoman Empire-occupied and liberated Balkan lands as far north as Belgrade.

=== Assassination attempt ===
In February 1861, a university student named Aristeidis Dosios (son of politician Konstantinos Dosios) unsuccessfully attempted to assassinate the queen. He was sentenced to death, though Queen Amalia intervened and he was pardoned, and sentenced to life imprisonment. He was hailed as a hero for his attempt by certain factions, but the attempt also provoked among the people spontaneous feelings of sympathy towards the royal couple.

=== Expulsion ===
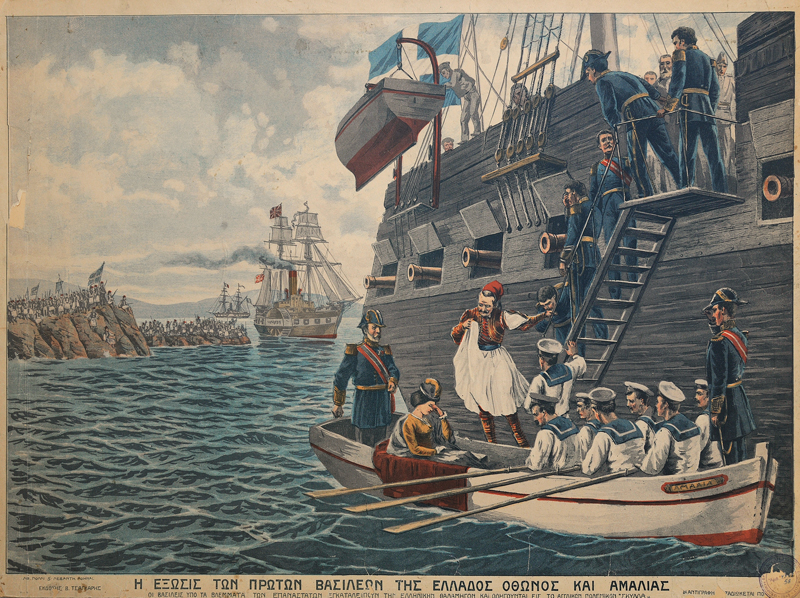
The expulsion of King Otto and Queen Amalia in 1862, as portrayed in a popular colour lithography

In 1862, just over a year after the assassination attempt, an uprising took place in Athens while the royal couple were on a visit to the Peloponnese. The Great Powers, who had supported Otto, urged them not to resist, and Otto's reign came to an end. They left Greece aboard a British warship, with the Greek royal regalia that they had brought with them. It was reported in the press that the royal courtiers weren’t aspersed, however, the queen's controversial favorite, Wilhelmine von Plüskow, was exposed to sarcasm from the crowd when she left.

It has been suggested that the king would not have been overthrown had Amalia borne an heir, as succession was also a major unresolved question at the time of uprising. It is also true, however, that the Constitution of 1843 made provision for Otto to be succeeded by his two younger brothers and their descendants.

== Exile and death ==
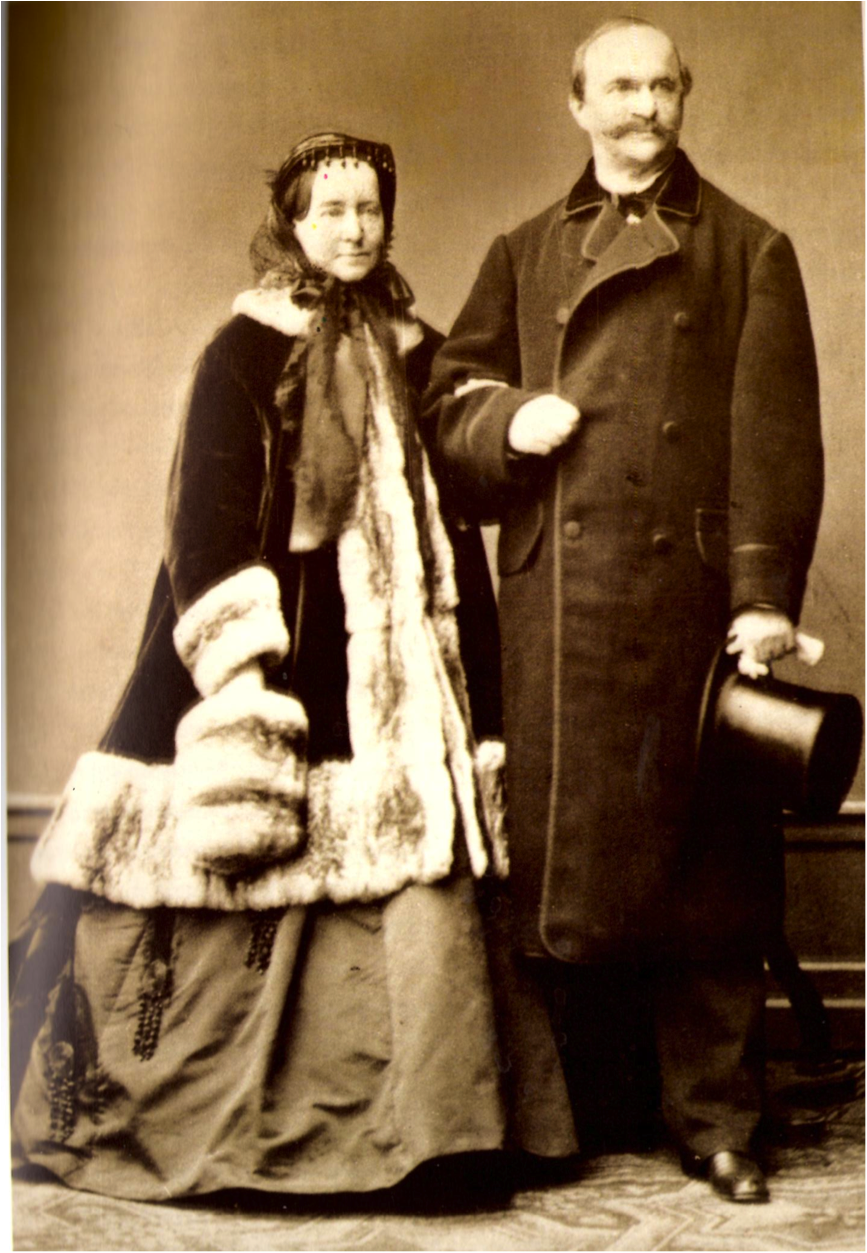
Amalia with her husband Otto, 1867

Otto and Amalia spent the rest of their years in exile, at home in Bavaria. They decided to speak Greek each day between 6 and 8 o'clock to remember their time in Greece.

Otto died in 1867. Queen Amalia survived her husband by almost eight years and died in Bamberg on 20 May 1875. She was buried beside the king at the Theatinerkirche in Munich.

The cause of the royal couple's infertility remained contested even after an autopsy was performed on the queen.

== Legacy ==
Queen Amalia founded the National Gardens of Athens in 1839, and an orphanage in Amaléion in 1855.

The town of Amaliada in Elis and the village of Amaliapolis in Magnesia were named after the queen, as was the columbine Aquilegia amaliae.

=== Archives ===
Queen Amalia's letters to her sister-in-law, Princess Mathilde Caroline of Bavaria, Grand Duchess of Hesse, written between 1837 and 1861, are preserved in the Hessian State Archive (Hessisches Staatsarchiv Darmstadt) in Darmstadt, Germany.

Queen Amalia's letters to her brother Peter II, Grand Duke of Oldenburg, written between 1861 and 1862, are preserved in the Niedersächsisches Landesarchiv in Oldenburg, Germany.

== Titles ==
- 21 December 1818 – 20 May 1875: Her Highness Duchess Amalie of Oldenburg, Princess of Holstein-Gottorp
- 22 December 1836 – 23 October 1862: Her Majesty The Queen of Greece
- 23 October 1862 – 20 May 1875: Her Majesty Queen Amalia of Greece

== Ancestry ==
Ancestors of Amalia of Oldenburg

8. Prince Georg Ludwig of Holstein-Gottorp
4. Peter I, Grand Duke of Oldenburg
9. Sofie Charlotte of Schleswig-Holstein-Sonderburg-Beck
2. Augustus, Grand Duke of Oldenburg
10. Frederick II Eugene, Duke of Württemberg
5. Duchess Frederica of Württemberg
11. Princess Friederike of Brandenburg-Schwedt
1. Amalia of Oldenburg
12. Charles Louis, Prince of Anhalt-Bernburg-Schaumburg-Hoym
6. Victor II, Prince of Anhalt-Bernburg-Schaumburg-Hoym
13. Princess Amalie Eleonore of Solms-Braunfels
3. Princess Adelheid of Anhalt-Bernburg-Schaumburg-Hoym
14. Charles Christian, Prince of Nassau-Weilburg
7. Amelia of Nassau-Weilburg
15. Princess Carolina of Orange-Nassau

Amalia of Oldenburg House of Oldenburg Born: 21 December 1818 Died: 20 May 1875
Greek royalty
New title	Queen consort of Greece; 22 December 1836 – 23 October 1862	Vacant Title next held by Olga Constantinovna of Russia as Queen of the Hellenes
