= Duke Elimar of Oldenburg =

German duke

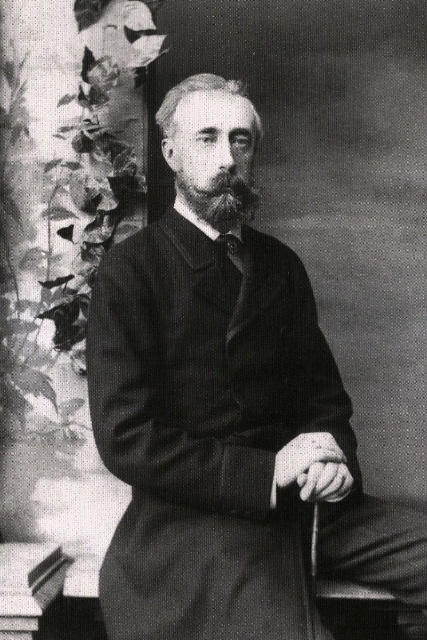
- Duke Elimar, late 1870s
- Born: 23 January 1844; Oldenburg
- Died: 17 October 1895 (aged 51); Erlau
- Spouse: Baroness Natalia Vogel von Friesenhof (m. 1876)
- Issue: Countess Alexandrine Gustava von Welsburg; Count Gustav Gregor von Welsburg
Names
- Anton Gunther Friedrich Elimar
- House: House of Holstein-Gottorp
- Father: Augustus, Grand Duke of Oldenburg
- Mother: Cecilia of Sweden

Anton Gunther Friedrich Elimar (23 January 1844 – 17 October 1895) was a duke of Oldenburg, and the son of Augustus, Grand Duke of Oldenburg and Princess Cecilia of Sweden.

== Family ==
Anton Gunther Friedrich Elimar was a child of Augustus, Grand Duke of Oldenburg and his third wife, Princess Cecilia of Sweden, daughter of King Gustav IV Adolf of Sweden. His eldest half-sister Amalia was the first modern Queen-consort of Greece.

Elimar wanted to please his father, but unlike his other half-sister and half-brothers he wanted to have a good education. He went to public academies which made his father concerned. When his father died Elimar felt lonely but continued to study at public academies.

== Marriage ==
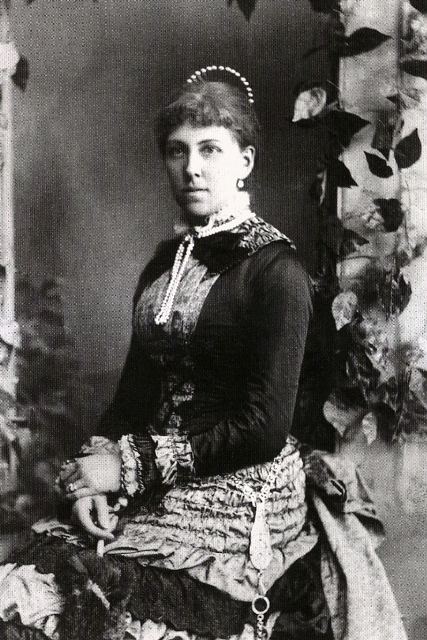
His wife, Baroness Natalia Vogel von Friesenhof, late 1870s.

On 9 November 1876 he married morganatically Baroness Natalia Vogel von Friesenhof in Vienna, daughter of Baron Gustav Vogel von Friesenhof (1807-1889) and his wife, Alexandrine Goncharova (1811-1891). Her mother, being the sister Natalia Goncharova, made her Alexandre Pushkin's niece and cousin of Natalia Alexandrovna Pushkina, Countess of Merenberg (1836-1913), herself the morganatic wife of Prince Nikolaus Wilhelm of Nassau. Upon marriage, she held the title Countess von Welsburg. The couple had two children:

- Countess Alexandrine Gustava Friederike von Welsburg (11 October 1877, Vienna - 13 April 1901, Austria); died unmarried at the age of 23.
- Count Gustav Gregor Alexander von Welsburg (29 August 1878, Hungary - 29 November 1927, Switzerland); married Countess Salbourg Luise von Hahn (1885-1923), daughter of Friedrich Franz, Count von Hahn (1859-1916) and his wife, Countess Therese Henckel von Donnersmarck (1859-1928). They had three sons and one daughter.

In their former castle in Brodzany (Slovakia) is the now Pushkin's museum.

== Honours ==
- Oldenburg: Grand Cross of the Order of Duke Peter Friedrich Ludwig, with Golden Crown, 23 January 1844
- Baden:
  - Knight of the House Order of Fidelity, 1860
  - Grand Cross of the Zähringer Lion, 1860
- Grand Duchy of Hesse: Grand Cross of the Ludwig Order, 7 November 1860
- Kingdom of Prussia:
  - Grand Cross of the Red Eagle, 18 October 1861
  - Knight's Cross of the Royal House Order of Hohenzollern, with Swords, 20 September 1866
- Kingdom of Hanover: Grand Cross of the Royal Guelphic Order, 1862

== Ancestors ==
Ancestors of Duke Elimar of Oldenburg

8. Prince George Louis of Holstein-Gottorp
4. Peter I, Grand Duke of Oldenburg
9. Princess Sophie Charlotte of Schleswig-Holstein-Sonderburg-Beck
2. Augustus, Grand Duke of Oldenburg
10. Frederick II Eugene, Duke of Württemberg
5. Duchess Frederica of Württemberg
11. Friederike Dorothea of Brandenburg-Schwedt
1. Duke Elimar of Oldenburg
12. Gustav III of Sweden
6. Gustav IV Adolf of Sweden
13. Sophia Magdalena of Denmark
3. Cecilia of Sweden
14. Margrave Charles Louis of Baden
7. Frederica of Baden
15. Landgravine Amalie of Hesse-Darmstadt
