= Peter of Oldenburg =

Peter of Oldenburg may refer to:

- Peter I, Grand Duke of Oldenburg (1755–1829), Regent of the Duchy of Oldenburg
- Peter II, Grand Duke of Oldenburg (1827–1900), Grand Duke of Oldenburg
- Duke Peter Georgievich of Oldenburg (1812–81), Duke of the House of Oldenburg
- Duke Peter Alexandrovich of Oldenburg (1868–1924), first husband of Grand Duchess Olga Alexandrovna of Russia
- Peter Friedrich Wilhelm, Duke of Oldenburg (1754–1823), Duke of Oldenburg
