= Peter II of Oldenburg =

Grand Duke of Oldenburg from 1853 to 1900

Peter II
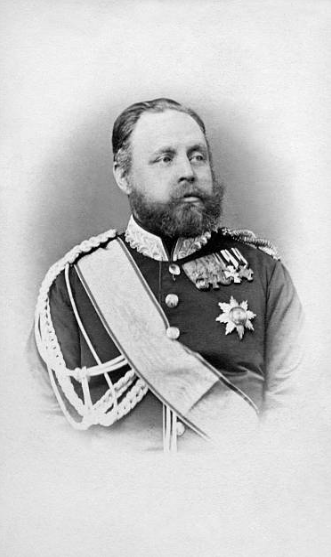
- Peter II in 1880

Grand Duke of Oldenburg
- Reign: 27 February 1853 – 13 June 1900
- Predecessor: Augustus
- Successor: Frederick Augustus II
- Born: 8 July 1827; Oldenburg
- Died: 13 June 1900 (aged 72); Rastede
- Burial: Ducal Mausoleum, Gertrudenfriedhof, Oldenburg
- Spouse: Elisabeth of Saxe-Altenburg (m. 1852; died 1896)
- Issue: Frederick Augustus II; Duke Georg Ludwig
Names
- German: Nikolaus Friedrich Peter
- House: House of Holstein-Gottorp
- Father: Augustus
- Mother: Princess Ida of Anhalt-Bernburg-Schaumburg-Hoym

Peter II (German: Nikolaus Friedrich Peter) (8 July 1827 – 13 June 1900) was the reigning Grand Duke of Oldenburg from 1853 to 1900. He claimed hereditary parts of Duchy of Holstein after the Second Schleswig War in 1864. After signing a treaty on 23 February 1867 in Kiel, he renounced his claims. In return, he received the district of Ahrensbök and the Prussian parts of the former Principality of Lübeck other than the village of Travenhorst, and was given a million taler as compensation from Prussia. Thus the Grand Duchy of Oldenburg gained access to the Baltic Sea.

== Birth and family ==
Duke Nikolaus Friedrich Peter was the only son of Augustus, Grand Duke of Oldenburg by his second wife Princess Ida of Anhalt-Bernburg-Schaumburg-Hoym. He was born on 8 July 1827 in Oldenburg.

== Early life ==
In his youth, he served as a General of Cavalry in the Prussian army. He also served as General of Infantry in the Hanoverian Army.

== Marriage ==
On 10 February 1852, Peter married Princess Elisabeth of Saxe-Altenburg. She was the fourth daughter of Joseph, Duke of Saxe-Altenburg and Amelia of Württemberg, and was a sister of Queen Marie of Hanover and Grand Duchess Alexandra Iosifovna of Russia.

They had two sons, Frederick Augustus (born in 1852) and George (1855–1939).

== Reign ==
He succeeded his father as Grand Duke in 1853. Peter ruled over a population of roughly 800,000.

Peter's family had ties to the Russian imperial family (both were descendants of Christian Albrecht of Holstein-Gottorp), so that he sided with Russia against Austria during the Crimean War. During the First Schleswig-Holstein War, he laid claim to part of the territories seized by Prussia, but in 1866 ceded his claim to the duchies. The following year, he created a military compact with Prussia, in which his troops were incorporated into the corps of Prince Frederick Charles of Prussia during the Franco-Prussian War.

In 1896, his wife Elisabeth died. She died a year after their daughter-in-law Elisabeth Anna.

After he suffered from heart trouble resulting from overwork, Peter's physicians recommended he have a long trip abroad. He died the following year, on 13 June 1900 at his summer residence in Rastede. He was succeeded as Grand Duke by his eldest son, Frederick Augustus.

== Honours ==
- Oldenburg: Grand Prior of the House and Merit Order of Duke Peter Friedrich Ludwig
- Saxe-Weimar-Eisenach: Grand Cross of the White Falcon, 25 May 1847
- (Saxe-Coburg and Gotha) (Duchy of Saxe-Altenburg) (Saxe-Meiningen) Ernestine duchies: Grand Cross of the Saxe-Ernestine House Order, June 1847
- Ascanian duchies: Grand Cross of Albert the Bear, 30 November 1847
- Kingdom of Prussia:
  - Knight of the Black Eagle, 17 May 1850; with Collar, 1868
  - Grand Cross of the Red Eagle, 8 August 1866

Iron cross 2nd class 1870

- Denmark: Knight of the Elephant, 2 April 1853
- Grand Duchy of Hesse: Grand Cross of the Ludwig Order, 3 April 1853
- Baden:
  - Knight of the House Order of Fidelity, 1853
  - Grand Cross of the Zähringer Lion, 1853
- Kingdom of Bavaria: Knight of St. Hubert, 1853
- Belgium: Grand Cordon of the Order of Leopold, 10 April 1853
- Württemberg: Grand Cross of the Württemberg Crown, 1853
- Kingdom of Hanover: Knight of St. George, 1855
- Austrian Empire: Grand Cross of St. Stephen, 1858
- Kingdom of Saxony: Knight of the Rue Crown, 1876

== Ancestry and descent ==
=== Ancestry ===
Ancestors of Peter II of Oldenburg

8. Prince Georg Ludwig of Holstein-Gottorp
4. Peter I, Grand Duke of Oldenburg
9. Princess Sophie Charlotte of Schleswig-Holstein-Sonderburg-Beck
2. Augustus, Grand Duke of Oldenburg
10. Frederick II Eugene, Duke of Württemberg
5. Duchess Frederica of Württemberg
11. Margravine Friederike Dorothea of Brandenburg-Schwedt
1. Peter II, Grand Duke of Oldenburg
12. Charles Louis, Prince of Anhalt-Bernburg-Schaumburg-Hoym
6. Victor II, Prince of Anhalt-Bernburg-Schaumburg-Hoym
13. Princess Amalie Eleonore of Solms-Braunfels
3. Princess Ida of Anhalt-Bernburg-Schaumburg-Hoym
14. Charles Christian, Prince of Nassau-Weilburg
7. Princess Amelia of Nassau-Weilburg
15. Princess Carolina of Orange-Nassau

=== Issue ===
Name	Birth	Death	Notes
Frederick Augustus II, Grand Duke of Oldenburg	16 November 1852	24 February 1931	married firstly Princess Elisabeth Anna of Prussia and secondly Duchess Elisabeth Alexandrine of Mecklenburg-Schwerin.
Duke Georg Ludwig of Oldenburg	27 June 1855	30 November 1939	

Peter II of Oldenburg House of Holstein-Gottorp Cadet branch of the House of Oldenburg Born: 8 July 1827 Died: 13 June 1900
Regnal titles
Preceded by Augustus	Grand Duke of Oldenburg; 1853–1900	Succeeded by Frederick Augustus II
