= Duchess Frederica of Württemberg =

Duchess Frederica
- Duchess Peter of Holstein-Gottorp
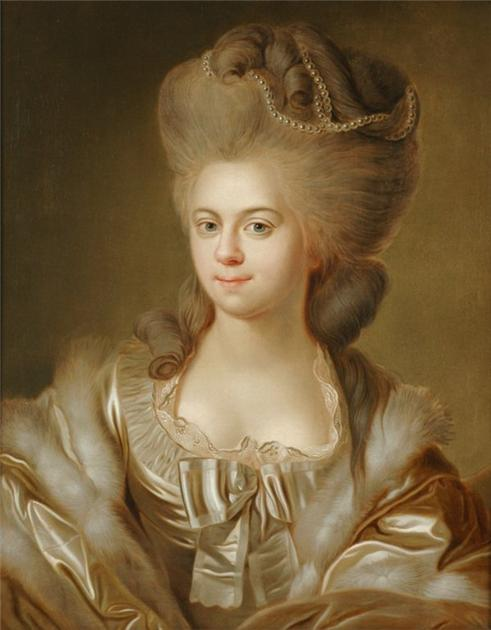
- Born: 27 July 1765; Treptow an der Rega, Kingdom of Prussia
- Died: 24 November 1785 (aged 20); Vienna, Archduchy of Austria
- Spouse: Prince Peter Frederick Louis of Holstein-Gottorp
- Issue: Augustus, Grand Duke of Oldenburg; Duke George of Oldenburg
Names
- German: Friederike Elisabeth Amalie Auguste
- House: Württemberg
- Father: Frederick II Eugene, Duke of Württemberg
- Mother: Friederike Dorothea of Brandenburg-Schwedt

Duchess Frederica of Württemberg (German: Friederike Elisabeth Amalie Auguste von Württemberg; 27 July 1765 – 24 November 1785) was a daughter of Frederick II Eugene, Duke of Württemberg and Friederike Dorothea of Brandenburg-Schwedt.

== Life ==
Frederica was born on 27 July 1765 in Treptow an der Rega (now Trzebiatów, Poland) as the seventh child and second daughter of Frederick II Eugene, Duke of Württemberg and Friederike Dorothea of Brandenburg-Schwedt. She was the sibling of King Frederick of Württemberg, Sophia Dorothea, Empress of Russia, and Elisabeth, Archduchess of Austria.

On 6 June 1781, Frederica married Prince Peter Frederick of Holstein-Gottorp. The marriage was meant to strengthen relations between Russia and Württemberg (Frederica's sister Sophia Dorothea was married to Paul I of Russia, a member of the House of Holstein-Gottorp). Her sister Sophia Dorothea encouraged the marriage, and her brother-in-law Paul I became the godfather of her sons.

=== Death ===
At the age of twenty, Frederica died from childbirth in Vienna on 24 November 1785. She also suffered from breast cancer at the time of her death. Her widowed husband Peter never remarried. He would succeed his cousin William as Grand Duke of Oldenburg in 1823, many years after Frederica's death.

== Issue ==
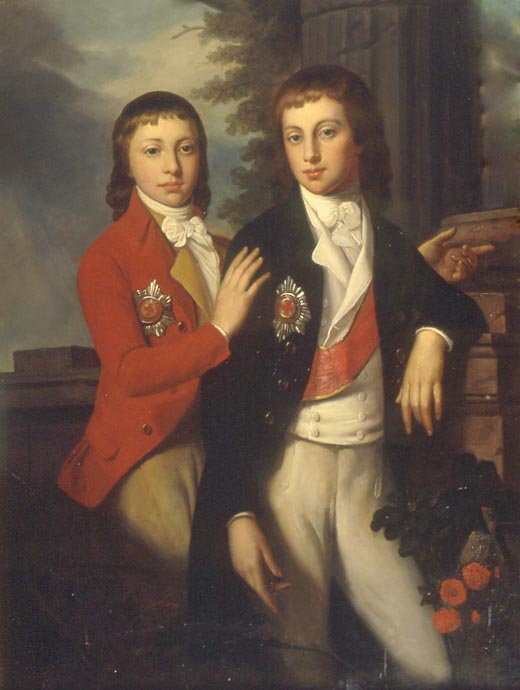
Frederica's two surviving sons: Augustus and George in the 1790s

| Name | Birth | Death | Notes |
|---|---|---|---|
| Paul Friedrich August, Grand Duke of Oldenburg | 13 July 1783 | 27 February 1853 | married firstly Princess Adelheid of Anhalt-Bernburg-Schaumburg-Hoym; had issue, including Amalia of Oldenburg who became Queen consort of Greece; secondly, he married Princess Ida of Anhalt-Bernburg-Schaumburg-Hoym; had issue; thirdly, he married Princess Cecilia of Sweden; had issue. |
| Duke Georg Peter Friedrich of Oldenburg | 9 May 1784 | 27 December 1812 | married Grand Duchess Catherine Pavlovna of Russia; had issue. |

== Ancestry ==
Ancestors of Duchess Frederica of Württemberg

8. Frederick Charles, Duke of Württemberg-Winnental
4. Charles Alexander, Duke of Württemberg
9. Margravine Eleonore Juliane of Brandenburg-Ansbach
2. Frederick II Eugene, Duke of Württemberg
10. Anselm Franz, Prince of Thurn and Taxis
5. Princess Marie Auguste of Thurn and Taxis
11. Princess Maria Ludovika of Lobkowicz
1. Duchess Frederica of Württemberg
12. Philip William, Margrave of Brandenburg-Schwedt
6. Frederick William, Margrave of Brandenburg-Schwedt
13. Princess Johanna Charlotte of Anhalt-Dessau
3. Princess Friederike of Brandenburg-Schwedt
14. Frederick William I of Prussia
7. Princess Sophia Dorothea of Prussia
15. Princess Sophia Dorothea of Hanover
