= General Washington (disambiguation) =

General Washington (1732–1799) was a Continental Army general and president of the United States from 1789 to 1797.

General Washington may also refer to:

- Jakob von Washington (1778–1848), Bavarian Army lieutenant general
- William Washington (1752–1810), Continental Army brigadier general
