= Aristeidis Dosios =

Greek economist, assassin of Queen Amalia

- Αριστείδης Δόσιος
- Born: 1844; Athens, Kingdom of Greece
- Died: April 1881 (aged 36–37); Athens, Kingdom of Greece
- Occupation(s): Writer, economist and banker
- Parent(s): Konstantinos Dosios; Leander Dossios

Aristeidis Dosios (Greek: Αριστείδης Δόσιος; c. 1844–1881) was a Greek economist, author and banker, best known for his attempted assassination of Queen Amalia. His father was the politician Konstantinos Dosios.
