= Oldenburgisches Staatstheater =

German theatre and opera house

Coordinates: 53°8′21″N 8°12′36″E

- Großherzogliches Hoftheater; Großherzogliches Residenztheater; Oldenburgisches Landestheater
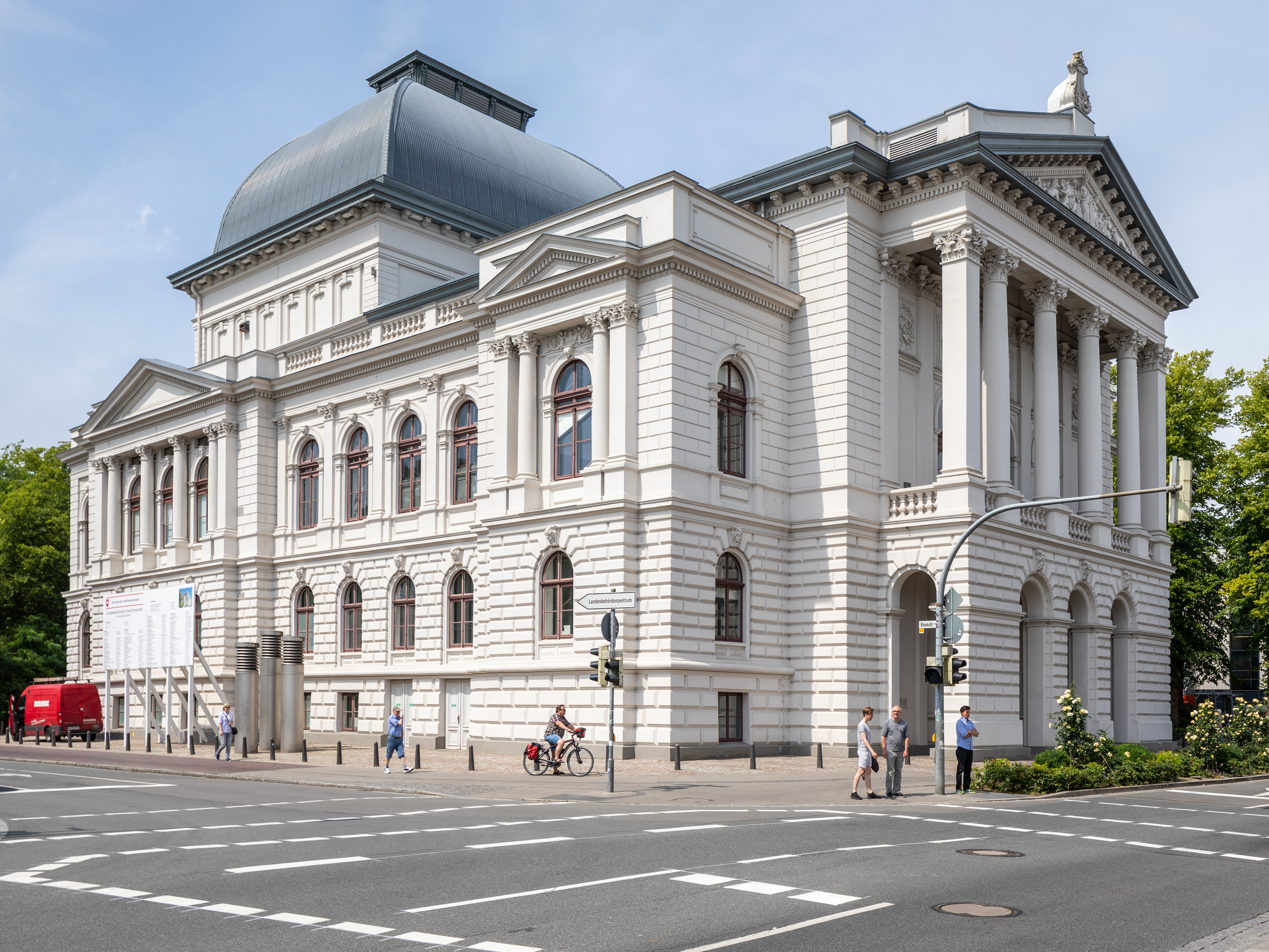
- View at the corner of Theaterwall and Roonstraße (2017)
- Interactive map of Oldenburgisches Staatstheater
- Address: venue: Theaterwall 19 office: Theaterwall 26; 26122 Oldenburg; Oldenburg (Lower Saxony); Germany
- Owner: City of Oldenburg
- Capacity: Großes Haus: 540; Kleines Haus: 350; Spielraum: 80
- Designation: Listed Baudenkmal

Construction
- Opened: February 1833; 193 years ago
- Rebuilt: 1881; 145 years ago, Gerhard Schnitger; 1893; 133 years ago, Franz Noack / Paul Moritz Zimmer
- Architect: Gerhard Schnitger (1841–1917)

Website
- www.staatstheater.de

The Oldenburgisches Staatstheater (Oldenburg State Theatre) is a German theater in the city of Oldenburg, Lower Saxony.

== Beginnings ==
The theatre was first opened in the times of the Grand Duchy of Oldenburg, on 1 February 1833. At that time it was a wooden structure built by local master carpenter Herman Wilhelm Muck, who also owned the building. Founder and first director of the theatre was Carl Christian Ludwig Starklof (1789–1850), a lawyer and writer who served as a privy councilor in Oldenburg. Also involved was actor Johann Christian Gerber (1785–1850) who had previously directed a theatre in the neighbouring city of Bremen. The founding was supported by Grand Duchess Cecilia (1807–1844). The theatre was named Großherzogliches Hoftheater (Grand Ducal Court Theatre) in 1842.

The wooden building was given up in 1881 when the theatre moved into the more imposing new Renaissance-style stone building designed by court architect Gerhard Schnitger. It was built next to the old structure.

Only ten years later, in November 1891, the new building burnt to the ground after a fire accident. The theatre company continued to work in a temporary wood building nearby while the destroyed venue was rebuilt under the supervision of Oldenburg court architect Franz Noack and Paul Moritz Zimmer, an architect from Chemnitz. The reconstruction adhered to Gerhard Schnitger’s original design, but modifications were made to replace gas lighting with electrical lighting. A large dome roof was added in order to accommodate a water tank above the stage area – an important fire protection measure at the time. Workshop space was expanded. The interior walls and ceilings were lavishly decorated with baroque-style mouldings, wall sculptures, frescoes. The new electrical lighting was integrated into the decoration. The theatre then reopened in October 1893.

== General directors since World War II ==
- Irene de Noiret and Otto Daue (both 1945/46)
- Albert Lippert (1946/47)
- Jost Dahmen (1947/48)
- Gerd Briese (1948–1954)
- Fred Schroer (1954–1957)
- Ernst Dietz (1957–1963)
- Wilhelm List-Diehl (1963–1968)
- Harry Niemann (1968–1985)
- Hans Häckermann (1985–1993)
- Stephan Mettin (1993–2001)
- Rainer Mennicken (2001–2007)
- Markus A. Müller (2007–2014)
- Christian Firmbach (2014–present)

== Sources ==
- Neumann, Karl-Heinz: Theater in Oldenburg. Wesen und Werden einer nordwestdeutschen Bühne, Oldenburg 1982, ISBN 3-87358-149-3.
- Schmidt, Heinrich (Ed.): Hoftheater, Landestheater, Staatstheater. Beiträge zur Geschichte des oldenburgischen Theaters 1833–1983, Oldenburg 1983, ISBN 3-87358-165-5.
- Krüger, Christian: Geschichte der Oper am Landestheater in Oldenburg 1921–1938. Ein Beitrag zur Musikgeschichte der Stadt Oldenburg vor dem Hintergrund der sozialen und politischen Entwicklung dieser Epoche, Oldenburg 1984, ISBN 3-87358-184-1.
