= Brodzany =

- Municipality
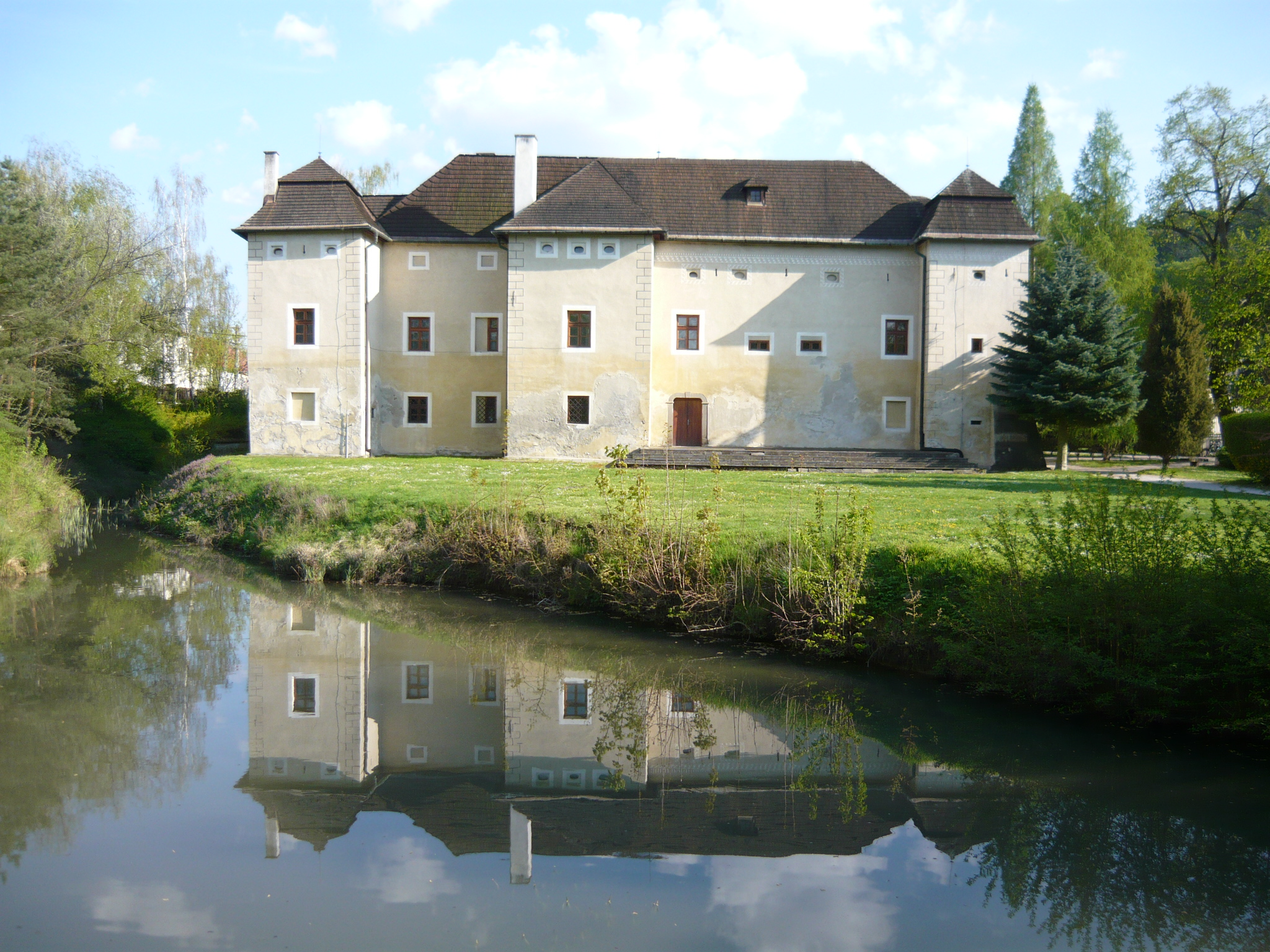
- Brodzany castle

- Flag

- Location of Brodzany in the Trenčín Region Location of Brodzany in Slovakia
- Coordinates: 48.60°N 18.35°E
- Country: Slovakia
- Region: Trenčín Region
- District: Partizánske District
- First mentioned: 1293

Area
  - Total: 18.29 km^{2} (7.06 sq mi)
- Elevation: 192 m (630 ft)

Population (2025)
  - Total: 884
- Time zone: UTC+1 (CET)
  - Summer (DST): UTC+2 (CEST)
- Postal code: 958 42
- Area code: +421 38
- Vehicle registration plate (until 2022): PE
- Website: www.brodzany.sk

Brodzany (Hungarian: Brogyán) is a village and municipality in Partizánske District in the Trenčín Region of western Slovakia.

== History ==
In historical records the village was first mentioned in 1293.

One of the owners – Duke Elimar of Oldenburg, husband of great Russian poet Alexandre Pushkin's niece. Now in Brodzany castle is Pushkin museum.

== Geography ==
The municipality lies at an altitude of 192 metres (630 ft) and covers an area of 18.29 km^{2} (7.06 sq mi) (2025).

== Population ==
Population statistic (10 years)
Year	1995	2005	2015	2025
Count	796	797	847	884
Difference		+0.12%	+6.27%	+4.36%

Population statistic
Year	2024	2025
Count	890	884
Difference		−0.67%

It has a population of 884 people (31 December 2025).

=== Ethnicity ===
Census 2021 (1+ %)
Ethnicity	Number	Fraction
Slovak	846	96.35%
Not found out	28	3.18%
Total	878	

In year 2021 was 878 people by ethnicity 846 as Slovak, 28 as Not found out, 7 as Czech, 1 as Romani, 1 as Russian, 1 as Romanian, 1 as Moravian and 1 as Hungarian.

Note on population: The difference values of population numbers in the table "Population statistic" and in the sections "Ethnicity" & "Religion" is caused by the use of various statistical methods.

=== Religion ===
Census 2021 (1+ %)
Religion	Number	Fraction
Roman Catholic Church	652	74.26%
None	177	20.16%
Not found out	24	2.73%
Evangelical Church	10	1.14%
Total	878	

In year 2021 was 878 people by religion 652 from Roman Catholic Church, 177 from None, 24 from Not found out, 10 from Evangelical Church, 3 from Paganism and natural spirituality, 3 from Ad hoc movements, 2 from Calvinist Church, 2 from Other, 1 from Jewish community, 1 from Other and not ascertained christian church, 1 from Christian Congregations in Slovakia, 1 from Greek Catholic Church and 1 from Buddhism.

== Genealogical resources ==
The records for genealogical research are available at the state archive "Statny Archiv in Nitra, Slovakia"

- Roman Catholic church records (births/marriages/deaths): 1766–1952 (parish B)

== See also ==
- List of municipalities and towns in Slovakia
