= Konstantinos Dosios =

Greek lawyer and politician (1810–1871)

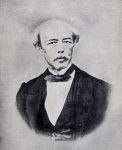
- Born: 1810; Vlasti, Ottoman Empire
- Died: 1871 (aged 60–61); Athens, Greece
- Occupations: Lawyer; politician

Konstantinos Dosios (1810–1871) was a Greek lawyer and politician in the newly established independent state of Greece and minister plenipotentiary to the church. His son Aristeidis Dosios, an economist, author and banker, became known for his attempted assassination of Queen Amalia.

== Sources ==
- http://www.christopherlong.co.uk/gen/mavrogordatogen/fg16/fg16_287.html
