= Augustus, Grand Duke of Oldenburg =

Grand Duke of Oldenburg from 1829 to 1853

Augustus I
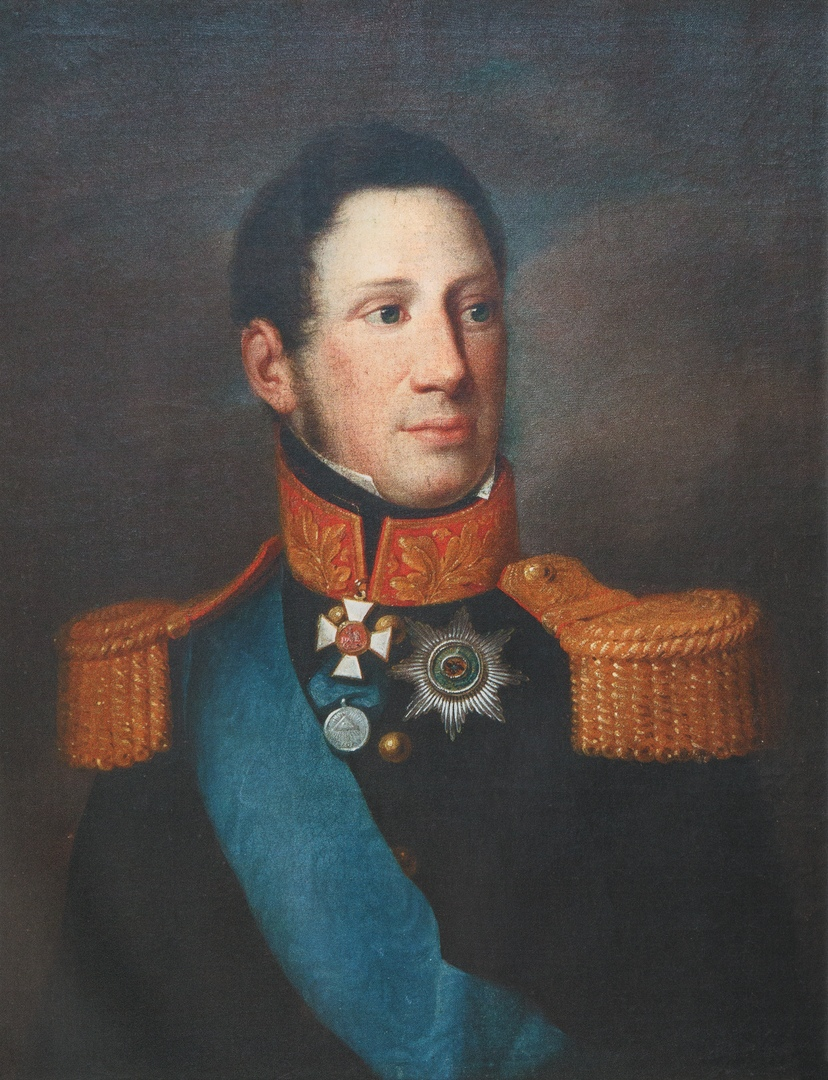

Grand Duke of Oldenburg
- Reign: 21 May 1829 – 27 February 1853
- Predecessor: Peter I
- Successor: Peter II
- Born: 13 July 1783; Rastede
- Died: 27 February 1853 (aged 69); Oldenburg
- Burial: Ducal Mausoleum, Gertrudenfriedhof, Oldenburg
- Spouse: Princess Adelheid of Anhalt-Bernburg-Schaumburg-Hoym (m. 1817; died 1820) Princess Ida of Anhalt-Bernburg-Schaumburg-Hoym (m. 1825; died 1828) Princess Cecilia of Sweden (m. 1831; died 1844)
- Issue: Amalia, Queen of Greece; Duchess Frederica, Baroness von Washington; Peter II; Duke Alexander; Duke August; Duke Elimar
Names
- German: Paul Friedrich August
- House: Holstein-Gottorp
- Father: Peter I
- Mother: Frederica of Württemberg
- Religion: Lutheranism

Augustus I or Paul Frederick Augustus (German: Paul Friedrich August von Oldenburg; 13 July 1783 – 27 February 1853) was the reigning Grand Duke of Oldenburg from 1829 to 1853.

== Birth and family ==
Augustus was born on 13 July 1783 at Schloss Rastede near Oldenburg, to the then Prince Peter Frederick Louis of Holstein-Gottorp and Duchess Frederica of Württemberg, daughter of Frederick II Eugene, Duke of Württemberg.

Augustus had one younger brother, Duke George of Oldenburg, who was a year younger than him. In 1785, his mother died in childbirth at the age of 20. His father never remarried.

== Early life ==
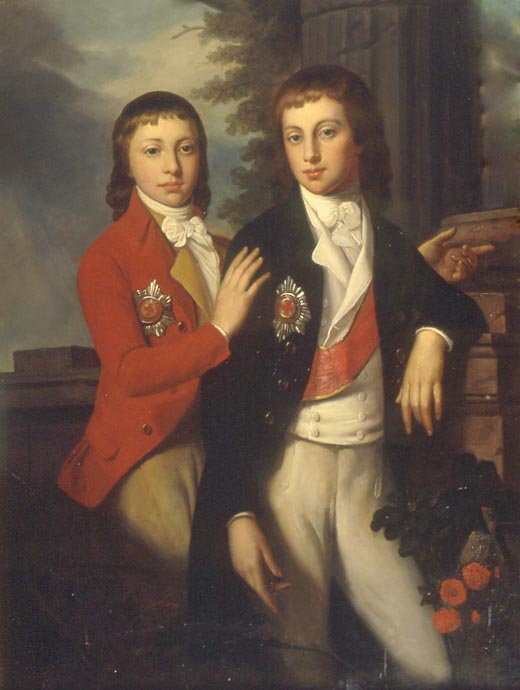
Augustus with his brother George in the 1790s.

In 1785, when Augustus was two years old, his father became Prince-Bishop of Lübeck and was furthermore appointed regent of the Duchy of Oldenburg for his incapacitated cousin William, Duke of Oldenburg.

From 1788 to 1803, the two princes were educated at home under the supervision of their father. Together with his brother, he studied at the University of Leipzig from 1803 to 1805. From 1805 to 1807 he and his brother travelled extensively in England and Scotland.

In 1808, he accompanied his father to the Congress of Erfurt, the meeting between Emperor Napoléon I of France and Tsar Alexander I of Russia. Between 1810 and 1814, Oldenburg was occupied by Napoleonic France.

In December 1810, the Duchy of Oldenburg was annexed by the French Empire and Augustus and his father traveled to Russia to stay in exile with their relatives, the Russian imperial family. This annexation was one of the causes for the diplomatic rift between former allies France and Russia, a dispute that would lead to war in 1812 and eventually to Napoleon's downfall.

From 1811 to 1816, he was Governor of Estonia where he led the work to prepare the abolition of serfdom. He participated in the Napoleonic Wars from 1812 to 1814. After the end of the Napoleonic Wars, he returned to Russia to finish his work as governor of Estonia. He returned to Oldenburg in 1816.

=== First marriage ===
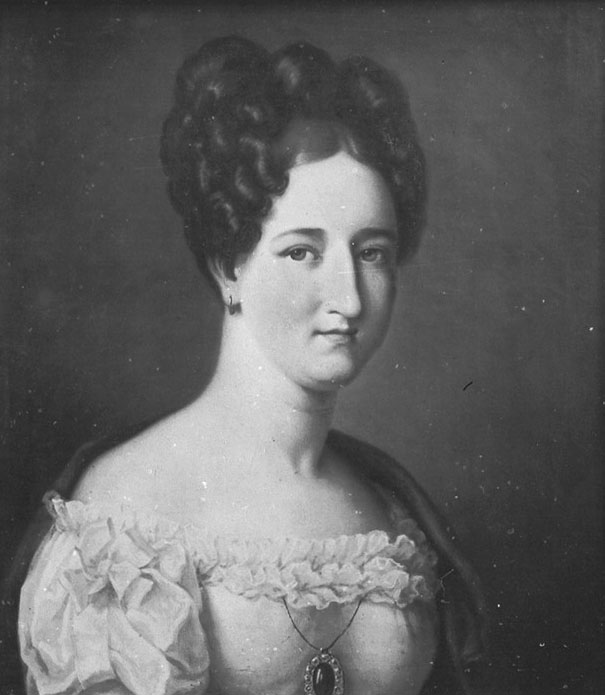
Augustus' first wife, Princess Adelheid of Anhalt-Bernburg-Schaumburg-Hoym

On 24 July 1817, at the age of 34, Augustus married Princess Adelheid of Anhalt-Bernburg-Schaumburg-Hoym. She was the daughter of Victor II, Prince of Anhalt-Bernburg-Schaumburg-Hoym, and Princess Amalie Charlotte of Nassau-Weilburg.

Augustus and Adelheid had two daughters; Amalia, who was born in 1818 and later married Prince Otto of Bavaria, the elected King of Greece, and thus became Queen consort of Greece; and Frederica, who was born in 1820 and later married Baron Maximilian Emanuel von Washington (1829–1903) son of Baron Jakob von Washington, a distant relative of the first President of the United States George Washington. However, Princess Adelheid died suddenly in 1820.

== Hereditary Prince ==
In 1823, his father succeeded as Duke of Oldenburg after the death of his cousin William, Duke of Oldenburg, and Augustus became heir apparent.

Although Oldenburg, like many other German duchies, had been elevated from a mere duchy to a grand duchy in 1815 at the Congress of Vienna, his father chose to continue the use of the lesser title of Duke, making Augustus the Hereditary Prince rather than the Hereditary Grand Duke of Oldenburg.

As Hereditary Prince, he participated extensively in the government of the duchy.

=== Second marriage ===
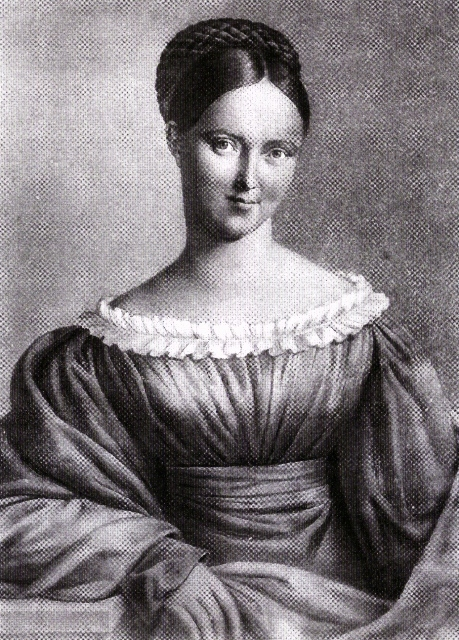
Augustus' second wife, Princess Ida of Anhalt-Bernburg-Schaumburg-Hoym

On 24 June 1825, after five years as a widower, Augustus married secondly Princess Ida of Anhalt-Bernburg-Schaumburg-Hoym, younger sister of his first wife.

Augustus and Ida had one son, Peter, who was born in 1827 and would later succeed Augustus as Grand Duke. Just like her sister, however, Princess Ida died after three years of marriage in 1828.

== Reign ==
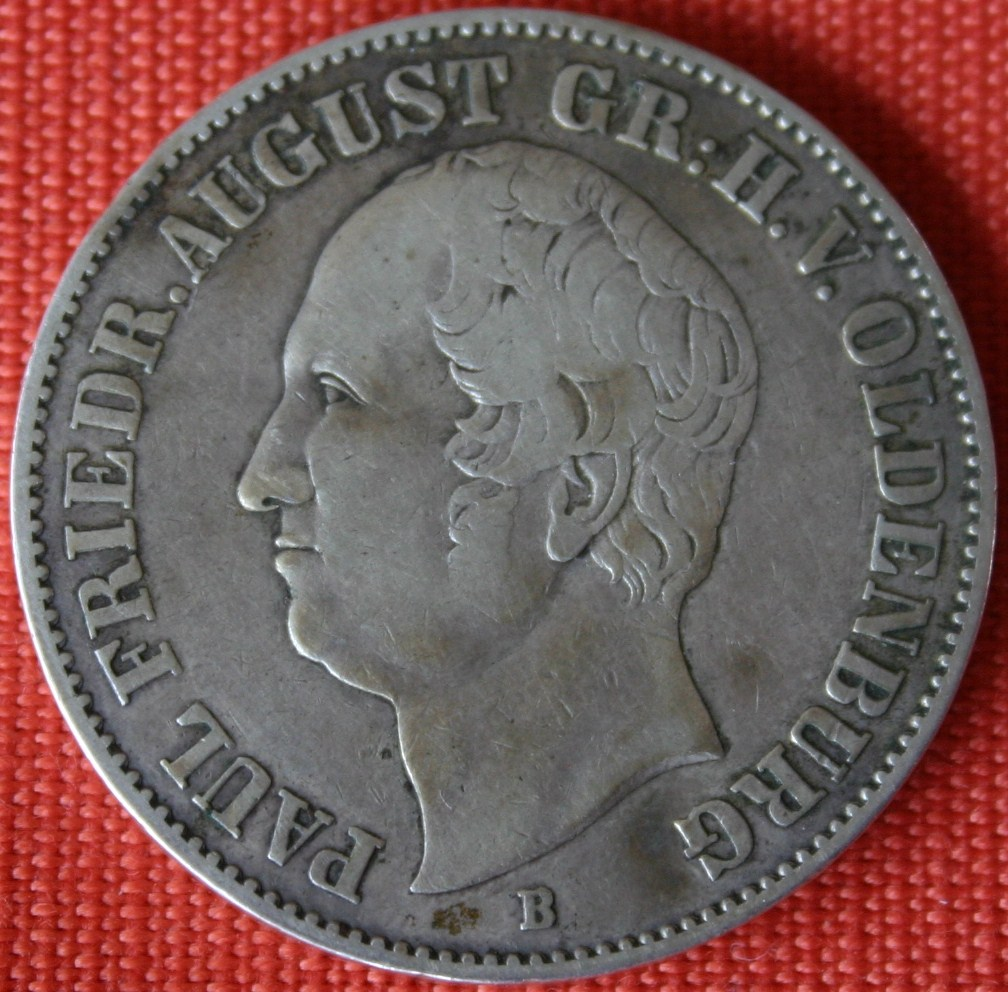
Grand Duke Augustus on a Thaler coin from 1846

Augustus succeeded his father, Grand Duke Peter I, to the throne of Oldenburg, and the Principality of Birkenfeld on 21 May 1829. Unlike his father, Augustus assumed the title of Grand Duke, and Augustus was thus the first to use the title Grand Duke of Oldenburg.

As Grand Duke, Augustus was employed in reforming the administration of his small state and showed himself a patriarchal ruler who cared for agriculture, transport, social welfare, art and science. Trade flourished along the lower Weser and Jade, and the city of Oldenburg developed into one of Northwestern Germany's cultural centres.

The Grand Duke however was reluctant to follow popular demands to introduce a constitution for the Grand Duchy. Although article 13 of the constitution of the German Confederation obliged Oldenburg to have a constitution, following the advice of his Russian relatives, the Grand Duke again and again postponed the promise of a constitution given in 1830.

Only as a consequence of the Revolutions of 1848 did the Grand Duke reluctantly give in under pressure from his advisers. On 18 February 1849, he signed the Oldenburg constitution which had already been revised by 1852.

=== Third marriage ===
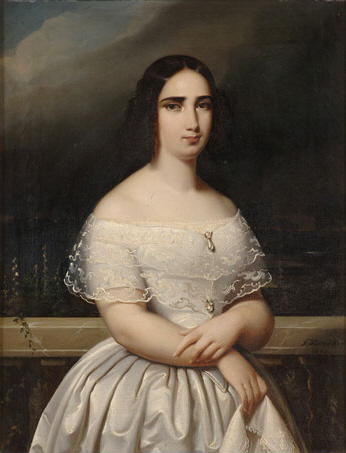
Augustus' third wife, Princess Cecilia of Sweden

On 5 May 1831, Augustus married thirdly his second cousin once removed Princess Cecilia of Sweden, daughter of the deposed King Gustav IV Adolf of Sweden. He had become Grand Duke two years earlier, making her the first Grand Duchess of Oldenburg.

Augustus and Cecilia had three sons, of which just one, Elimar, survived to adulthood.

Grand Duchess Cecilia died on 27 January 1844 in Oldenburg.

== Death and succession ==
Grand Duke Augustus died on 27 February 1853 in Oldenburg. He was buried in the Ducal Mausoleum in the Churchyard of Saint Gertrude in Oldenburg. Augustus was succeeded as Grand Duke by his eldest son, Peter.

== Legacy ==
The settlement Augustfehn in Ammerland in Lower Saxony, Germany, is named after Grand Duke Augustus.

== Honours ==
- Russian Empire:
  - Knight of the Order of St. Andrew, 26 July 1801
  - Knight of the Order of St. Alexander Nevsky, 26 July 1801
  - Knight of the Order of St. George, 3rd Class, 16 September 1812
  - Knight of the Order of St. Vladimir, 1st Class, 26 May 1816
- Denmark: Knight of the Order of the Elephant, 29 July 1829
- Saxe-Weimar-Eisenach: Grand Cross of the Order of the White Falcon, 22 April 1830
- Kingdom of Hanover: Grand Cross of the Royal Guelphic Order, 1830
- Austrian Empire: Grand Cross of the Order of St. Stephen, 1831
- Baden:
  - Grand Cross of the House Order of Fidelity, 1831
  - Grand Cross of the Order of the Zähringer Lion, 1831
- Kingdom of Prussia: Knight of the Order of the Black Eagle, 21 October 1834
- Oldenburg: Founder of the House and Merit Order of Peter Frederick Louis, 27 November 1838
- Kingdom of Bavaria: Knight of the Order of Saint Hubert, 1839
- Belgium: Grand Cordon of the Order of Leopold, 30 January 1841
- Württemberg: Grand Cross of the Order of the Württemberg Crown

== Ancestry and descent ==
=== Ancestry ===
Ancestors of Augustus, Grand Duke of Oldenburg

8. Christian August of Holstein-Gottorp, Prince of Eutin
4. Prince Georg Ludwig of Holstein-Gottorp
9. Margravine Albertina Frederica of Baden-Durlach
2. Peter I, Grand Duke of Oldenburg
10. Frederick William II, Duke of Schleswig-Holstein-Sonderburg-Beck
5. Princess Sophie Charlotte of Schleswig-Holstein-Sonderburg-Beck
11. Burgravine and Countess Ursula Anna of Dohna-Schlodien-Carwinden
1. Augustus, Grand Duke of Oldenburg
12. Karl Alexander, Duke of Württemberg
6. Frederick II Eugene, Duke of Württemberg
13. Princess Maria Augusta of Thurn and Taxis
3. Duchess Frederica of Württemberg
14. Margrave Frederick William of Brandenburg-Schwedt
7. Friederike Dorothea of Brandenburg-Schwedt
15. Princess Sophia Dorothea of Prussia

=== Issue ===
| Name | Birth | Death | Notes |
|---|---|---|---|
| Duchess Amalia | 21 December 1818 | 20 May 1875 | married Otto of Bavaria, the elected King of Greece, and thus became Queen consort of Greece. |
| Duchess Frederica | 8 June 1820 | 20 March 1891 | married Baron Maximilian Emanuel von Washington, a distant relative of the first President of the United States George Washington. |
| Duke Peter | 8 July 1827 | 13 June 1900 | succeeded his father as Grand Duke of Oldenburg; married Princess Elisabeth of Saxe-Altenburg; had issue |
| Duke Alexander | 16 June 1834 | 6 June 1835 | |
| Duke August | 15 February 1836 | 30 April 1837 | |
| Duke Elimar | 23 January 1844 | 17 October 1895 | married morganatically Baroness Natalie Vogel von Friesenhof |

== Sources ==
- Oakes, Augustus Henry (1921). The Great European Treaties of the Nineteenth Century. Oxford: Oxford University Press.
- Hermann Lübbing (1953). "August I.". Neue Deutsche Biographie (in German). Vol. 1. Berlin: Duncker & Humblot. pp. 446–447.
- Theodor Merzdorf (1875). "Paul Friedrich August (Großherzog von Oldenburg)" . Allgemeine Deutsche Biographie (in German). Vol. 1. Leipzig: Duncker & Humblot. pp. 667–669.

Augustus, Grand Duke of Oldenburg House of Holstein-Gottorp Cadet branch of the House of Oldenburg Born: 13 July 1783 Died: 27 February 1853
Regnal titles
| Preceded by Peter I | Grand Duke of Oldenburg; 1829–1853 | Succeeded by Peter II |
