= Duke George of Oldenburg =

German duke (1784–1812)

George
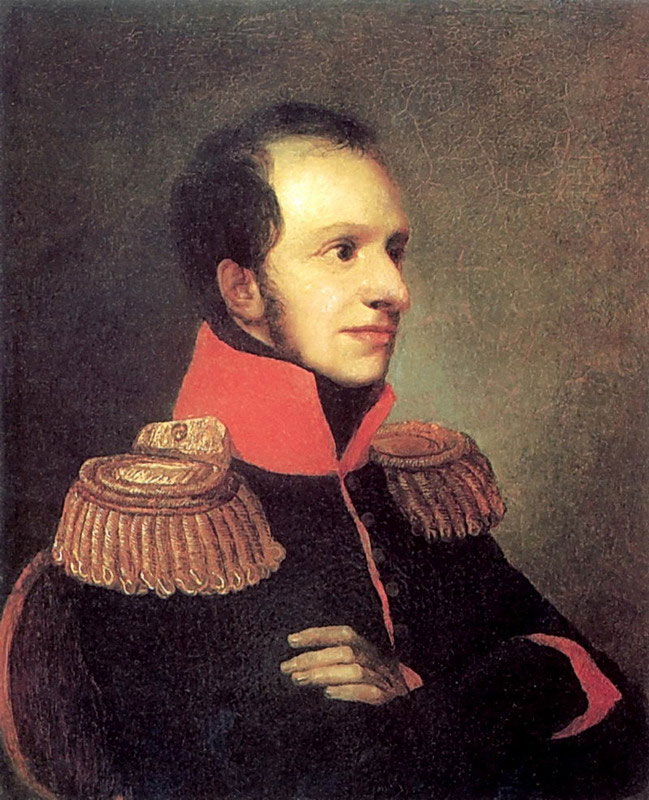
- 1811 portrait
- Born: 9 May 1784; Oldenburg, Duchy of Oldenburg
- Died: 27 December 1812 (aged 28); Tver, Russian Empire
- Spouse: Catherine Pavlovna of Russia (m. 1809)
- Issue: Duke Alexander; Duke Peter
Names
- Peter Frederick George; German: Peter Friedrich Georg
- House: Oldenburg
- Father: Peter I, Duke of Oldenburg
- Mother: Duchess Frederica of Württemberg

Duke Peter Frederick George of Oldenburg (German: Herzog Peter Friedrich Georg von Oldenburg; 9 May 1784 – 27 December 1812) was a younger son of Peter I, Grand Duke of Oldenburg and his wife Duchess Frederica of Württemberg. He was a son-in-law of Paul I of Russia through marriage to his daughter Grand Duchess Catherine Pavlovna of Russia. He was referred to as a prince in Russia, Prince Georgy Petrovich Oldenburgsky.

== Birth and family ==
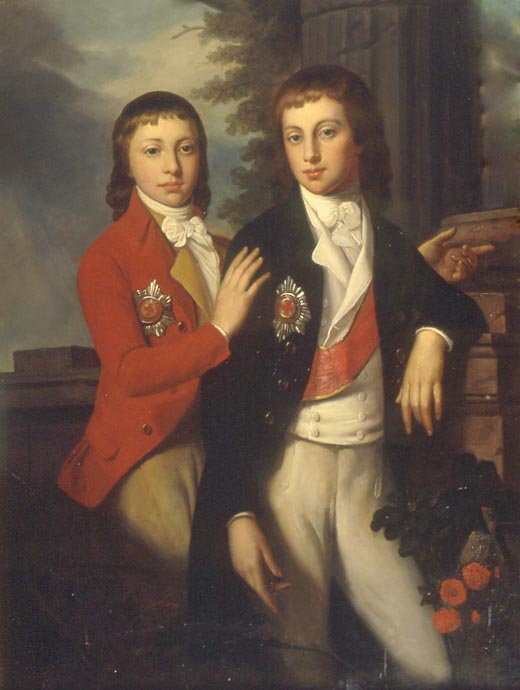
George with his brother Augustus in the 1790s

George was born on 9 May 1784 to the then Prince Peter Frederick Louis of Holstein-Gottorp and his wife Duchess Frederica of Württemberg, a daughter of Frederick II Eugene, Duke of Württemberg.

George had an elder brother, Duke Augustus of Oldenburg, who was one year older than him.

In 1785, when George was one year old, his mother died from childbirth. His father never remarried.

=== Early life ===
In 1785, when George was one year old, his father became Prince-Bishop of Lübeck and was furthermore appointed regent of the Duchy of Oldenburg for his incapacitated cousin William, Duke of Oldenburg.

From 1788 to 1803, George and his brother were educated at home under the supervision of their father. Together, the two princes studied at the University of Leipzig from 1803 to 1805. From 1805 to 1807 they travelled extensively in England and Scotland.

In the start of 1808, when Oldenburg was occupied by French and Dutch troops, George was sent to Russia to stay with his relatives, the Russian Imperial family. Upon his arrival, he was appointed Governor of Estonia.

== Marriage ==
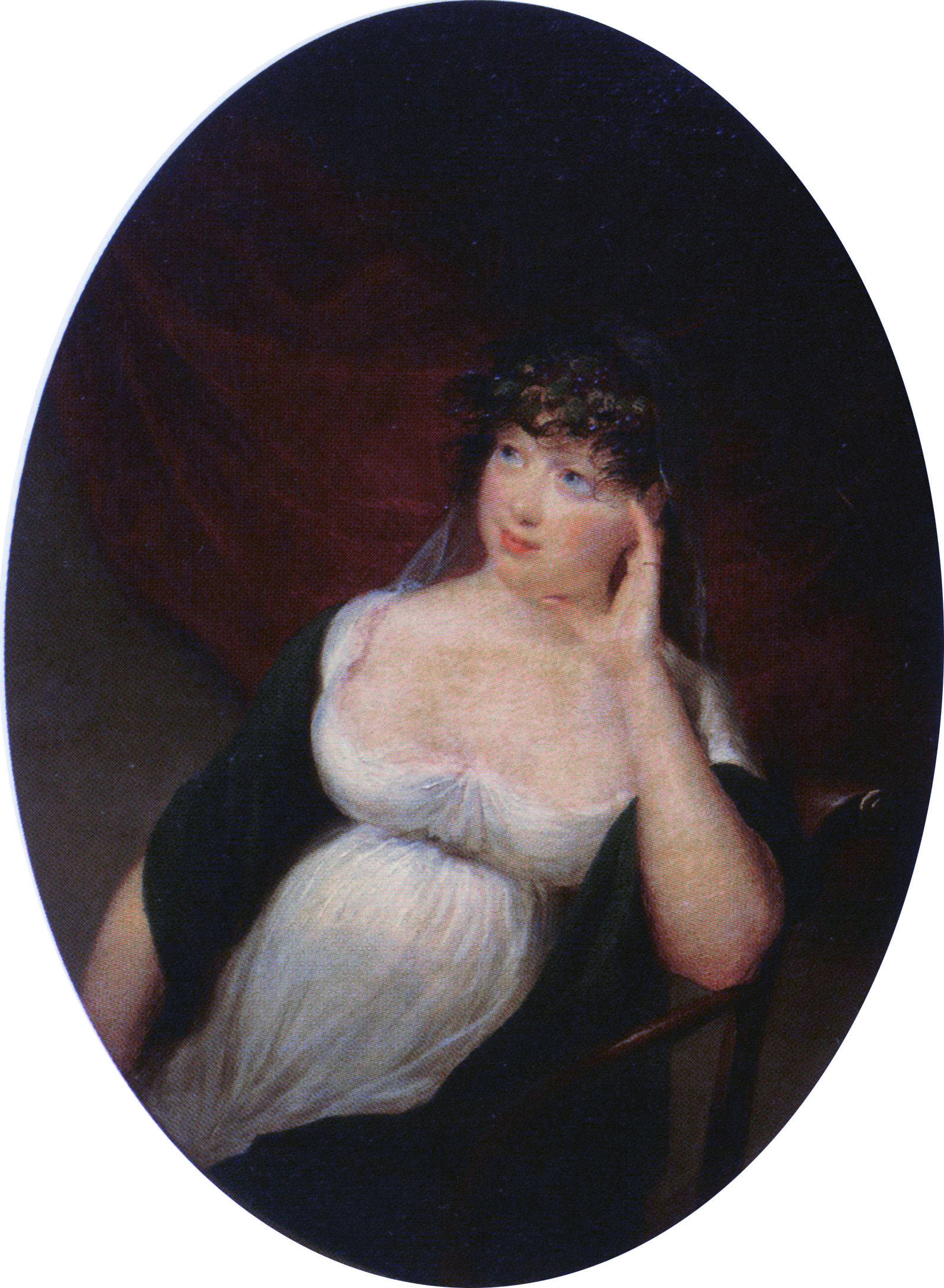
His wife, Catherine Pavlovna, in 1805

On 3 August 1809, George married Grand Duchess Catherine Pavlovna of Russia, the fourth daughter of Paul I of Russia and Sophie Dorothea of Württemberg and favorite sister of the Emperor Alexander I of Russia. The events behind their marriage began when Napoleon Bonaparte, hoping to secure a Russian alliance as well as a male heir, hinted his desire to marry Catherine after finalizing his divorce with Empress Joséphine. This so horrified the Russian imperial family that Catherine's mother immediately arranged her marriage to her cousin, Duke George. The day the marriage occurred, Duke George received the style Imperial Highness and was appointed the governor-general of the three central provinces of Tver, Yaroslavl and Novgorod.

Though their marriage was arranged, it was happy. Catherine was considered beautiful and vivacious and was devoted to her husband. As George was a younger son with little prospects of inheriting the Grand Dukedom of Oldenburg, he and Catherine lived in Tver, Russia. Their family adopted the use of Russian patronyms and were known as the Oldenburgsky.

They had two sons:

- Duke Peter Georg Paul Alexander of Oldenburg (30 August 1810 – 16 November 1829)
- Duke Konstantin Friedrich Peter of Oldenburg (26 August 1812 – 14 May 1881)

== Later life ==
On 22 January 1811, Oldenburg was annexed by Napoleon. As George was married to Tsar Alexander I's sister, the Russians considered Napoleon's move a great insult, and it was one of many grievances Alexander would bring up in their correspondence. The Oldenburg family was later given back their duchy after Napoleon's defeat.

He was appointed governor on the Volga but died from typhoid fever in 1812. His death was a great blow to his wife, but she would go on to marry the future William I of Württemberg in 1816.

After her death in 1819, their children were raised by George's brother Grand Duke Augustus in Oldenburg.

== Ancestry ==
Ancestors of Duke George of Oldenburg

8. Christian August of Holstein-Gottorp, Prince of Eutin
4. Prince Georg Ludwig of Holstein-Gottorp
9. Margravine Albertina Frederica of Baden-Durlach
2. Peter I, Grand Duke of Oldenburg
10. Frederick William II, Duke of Schleswig-Holstein-Sonderburg-Beck
5. Princess Sophie Charlotte of Schleswig-Holstein-Sonderburg-Beck
11. Burgravine and Countess Ursula Anna of Dohna-Schlodien-Carwinden
1. George, Duke of Oldenburg
12. Karl Alexander, Duke of Württemberg
6. Frederick II Eugene, Duke of Württemberg
13. Princess Maria Augusta of Thurn and Taxis
3. Duchess Frederica of Württemberg
14. Margrave Frederick William of Brandenburg-Schwedt
7. Friederike Dorothea of Brandenburg-Schwedt
15. Princess Sophia Dorothea of Prussia

== Sources ==
- Grab, Alexander I. (2003). Napoleon and the Transformation of Europe. New York: Palgrave Macmillan. ISBN 0-333-68274-2.
- Seton-Watson, Hugh (1988). The Russian Empire, 1801–1917. New York: Oxford University Press. ISBN 0-19-822152-5.
- Theodor Merzdorf (1875). "Paul Friedrich August (Großherzog von Oldenburg)" . Allgemeine Deutsche Biographie (in German). Vol. 1. Leipzig: Duncker & Humblot. pp. 667–669.
