= Princess Adelheid of Anhalt-Bernburg-Schaumburg-Hoym =

Princess

Princess Adelheid
- Duchess Paul Frederick Augustus of Oldenburg
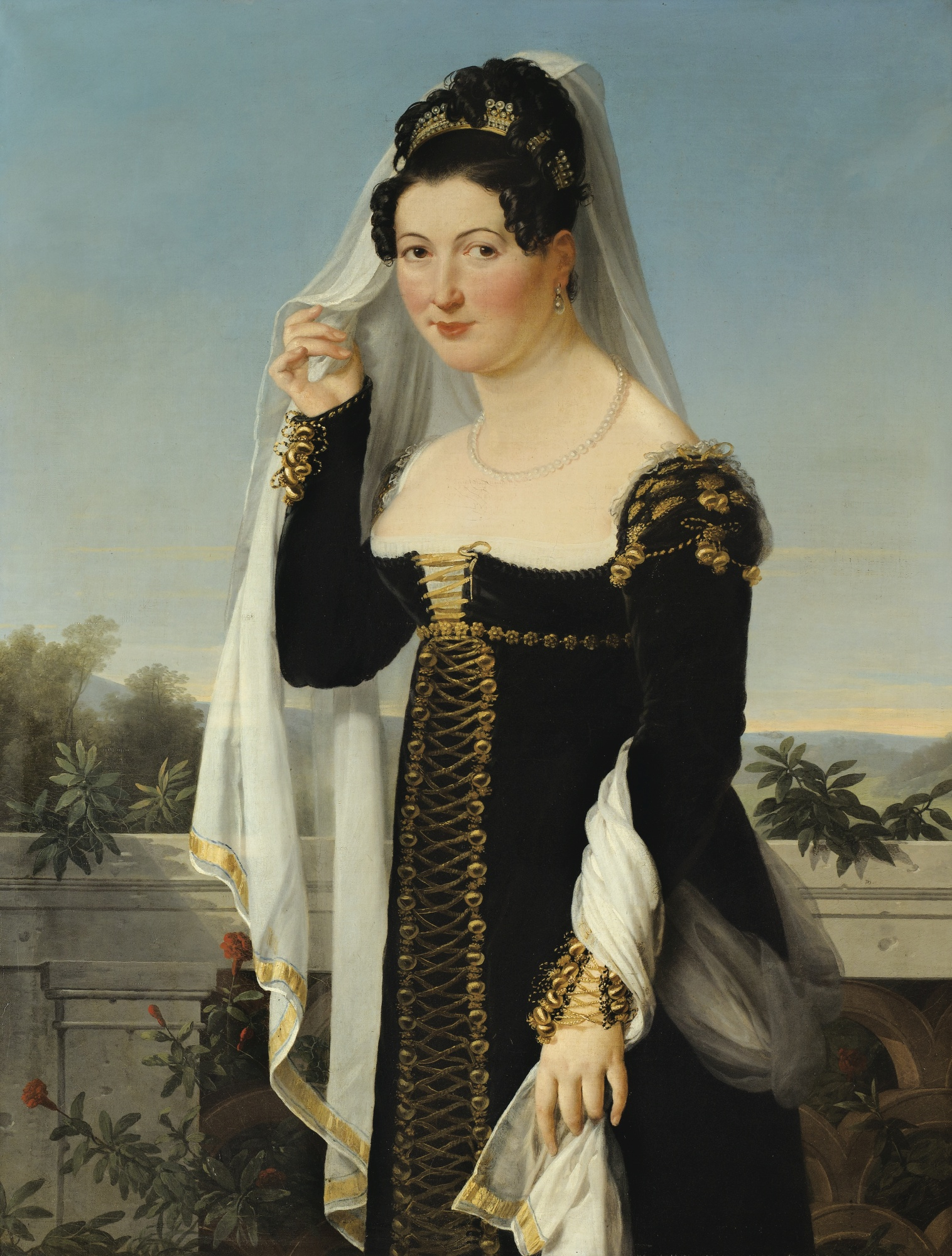
- Born: 23 February 1800; Schaumburg Castle, Rhineland-Palatinate
- Died: 13 September 1820 (aged 20); Oldenburg
- Spouse: Duke Paul Frederick Augustus of Oldenburg (m. 1817)
- Issue: Amalia, Queen of Greece; Friederike, Baroness von Washington
- House: Ascania
- Father: Victor II, Prince of Anhalt-Bernburg-Schaumburg-Hoym
- Mother: Amelia of Nassau-Weilburg

Princess Adelheid of Anhalt-Bernburg-Schaumburg-Hoym (German: Prinzessin Adelheid von Anhalt-Bernburg-Schaumburg-Hoym; 23 February 1800 – 13 September 1820) was a princess of Anhalt-Bernburg-Schaumburg-Hoym by birth as the daughter of Victor II, Prince of Anhalt-Bernburg-Schaumburg-Hoym. As the wife of Duke Paul Frederick Augustus of Oldenburg, she became a Duchess of Oldenburg by marriage.

== Birth and family ==
Princess Adelheid was born on 23 February 1800 at Schaumburg Castle. She was the second daughter of Victor II, Prince of Anhalt-Bernburg-Schaumburg-Hoym, and Princess Amelia of Nassau-Weilburg.

Adelheid had three sisters: Hermine, Emma and Ida. She grew up with her sisters in Hoym in Anhalt.

== Marriage ==
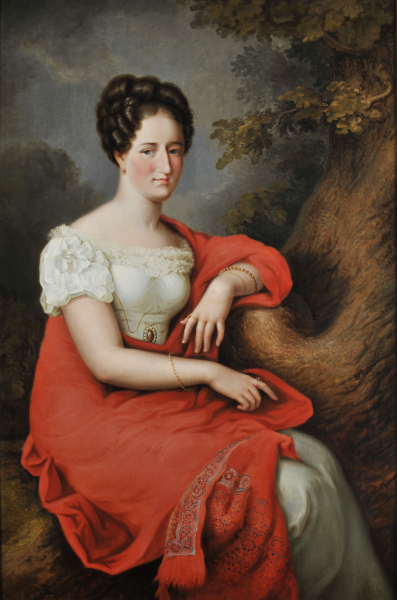
As Princess Adelheid von Oldenburg

Adelheid became a princess of Holstein-Oldenburg upon her marriage. Adelheid married Duke Paul Frederick Augustus of Oldenburg on 24 July 1817 at Schaumburg Castle. The princess was just 17 years old when she married the 34-year-old duke. Duke Paul Frederick Augustus was the eldest son of Duke Peter of Oldenburg, heir to the Duchy of Oldenburg, and was thus second in line of succession after his father.

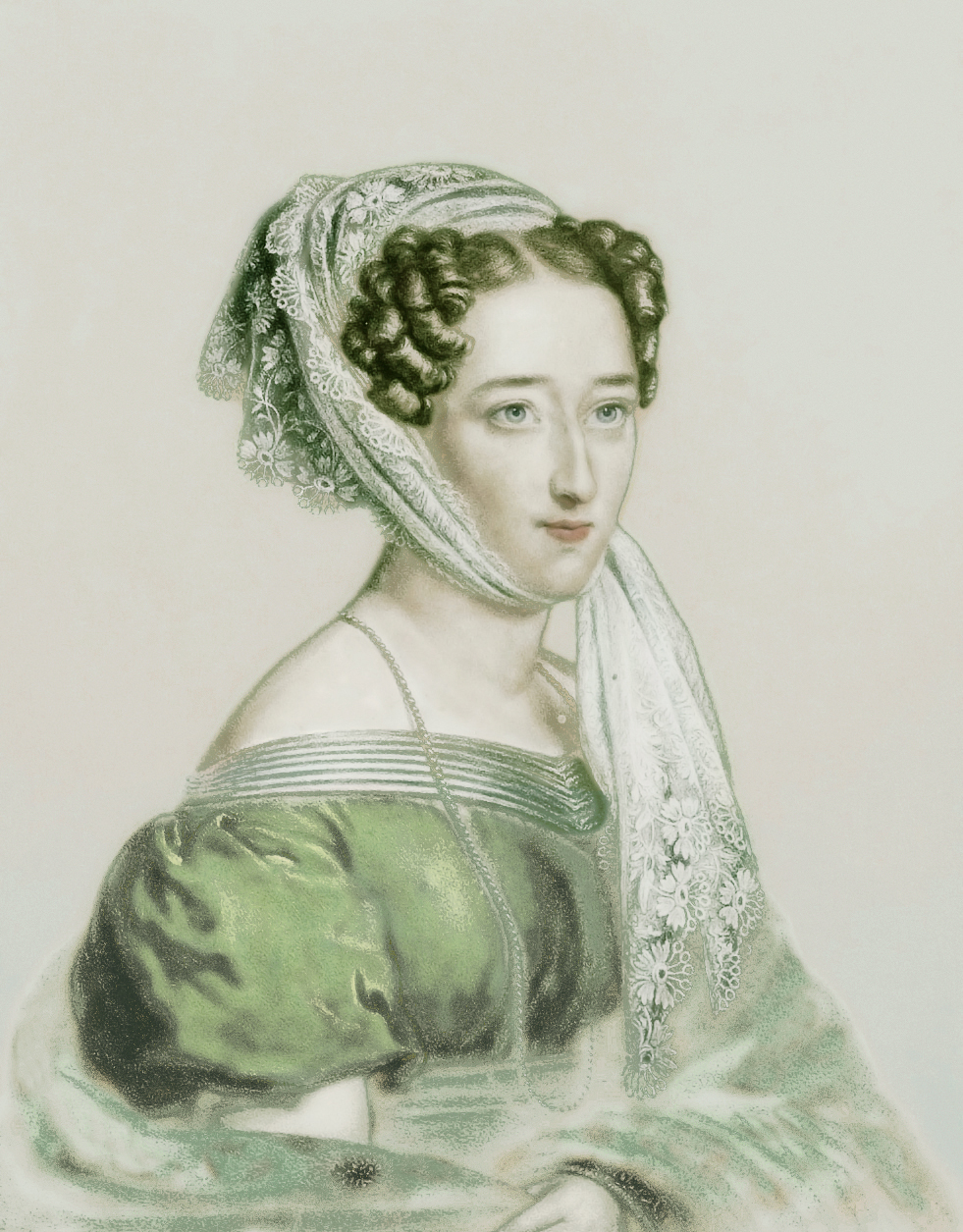
Princess Adelheid in 1819, by an unknown painter

Adelheid and Augustus had two daughters; Amalia, who was born in 1818, and Friederike, who was born in 1820.

== Death and aftermath ==
At the age of 20, and after three years of marriage, Princess Adelheid died suddenly on 13 September 1820 at Oldenburg.

She was buried at the Ducal Mausoleum, at Saint Gertrude’s Cemetery in Oldenburg.

Augustus married Adelheid's younger sister, Princess Ida of Anhalt-Bernburg-Schaumburg-Hoym, in 1825 upon Adelheid’s death. Augustus became Grand Duke of Oldenburg in 1829.

== Ancestry and descent ==
=== Ancestry ===
As a direct, legitimate descendant of Sophia, Electress of Hanover, she was in line to the British throne through her Great-Great-grandfather, George II of Great Britain.

Ancestors of Princess Adelheid of Anhalt-Bernburg-Schaumburg-Hoym

16. Lebrecht, Prince of Anhalt-Zeitz-Hoym
8. Victor I, Prince of Anhalt-Bernburg-Schaumburg-Hoym
17. Charlotte of Nassau-Dillenburg
4. Karl Louis, Prince of Anhalt-Bernburg-Schaumburg-Hoym
18. William Maurice, Count of Isenburg-Büdingen-Birstein
9. Charlotte Louise of Isenburg-Büdingen-Birstein
19. Anna Amalia of Isenburg-Büdingen
2. Victor II, Prince of Anhalt-Bernburg-Schaumburg-Hoym
20. William Maurice, Count of Solms-Braunfels
10. Frederick William I, Prince of Solm-Braunfels
21. Magdalene Sophie of Hesse-Homburg
5. Amalie Eleonore of Solm-Braunfels
22. Carl Otto, Count of Solms-Laubach
11. Sophie of Solm-Laubach
23. Louise Albertine of Schönburg-Waldenburg
1. Adelheid of Anhalt-Bernburg-Schaumburg-Hoym
24. John Ernest, Prince of Nassau-Weilburg
12. Charles August, Prince of Nassau-Weilburg
25. Maria Polyxena of Leiningen-Dagsburg-Hartenburg
6. Charles Christian, Prince of Nassau-Weilburg
26. George August, Count of Nassau-Idstein
13. Auguste Friederike of Nassau-Saarbrücken-Idstein
27. Henriette Dorothea of Oettingen-Oettingen
3. Amelia of Nassau-Weilburg
28. John William Friso, Prince of Orange
14. William IV, Prince of Orange
29. Marie Louise of Hesse-Kassel
7. Carolina of Orange-Nassau
30. George II of Great Britain
15. Anne of Great Britain
31. Caroline of Brandenburg-Ansbach

=== Issue ===
Name	Birth	Death	Notes
Duchess Amalia	21 December 1818	20 May 1875	Married Otto of Bavaria, the elected King of Greece, and thus became Queen consort of Greece.
Duchess Frederica	8 June 1820	20 March 1891	Married the son of Jakob von Washington, a distant relative of the first President of the United States George Washington.

She has had no living descendants since the mid-20th century.
