= Amelia of Nassau-Weilburg =

- Baroness Frederick of Stein-Liebenstein-Barchfeld
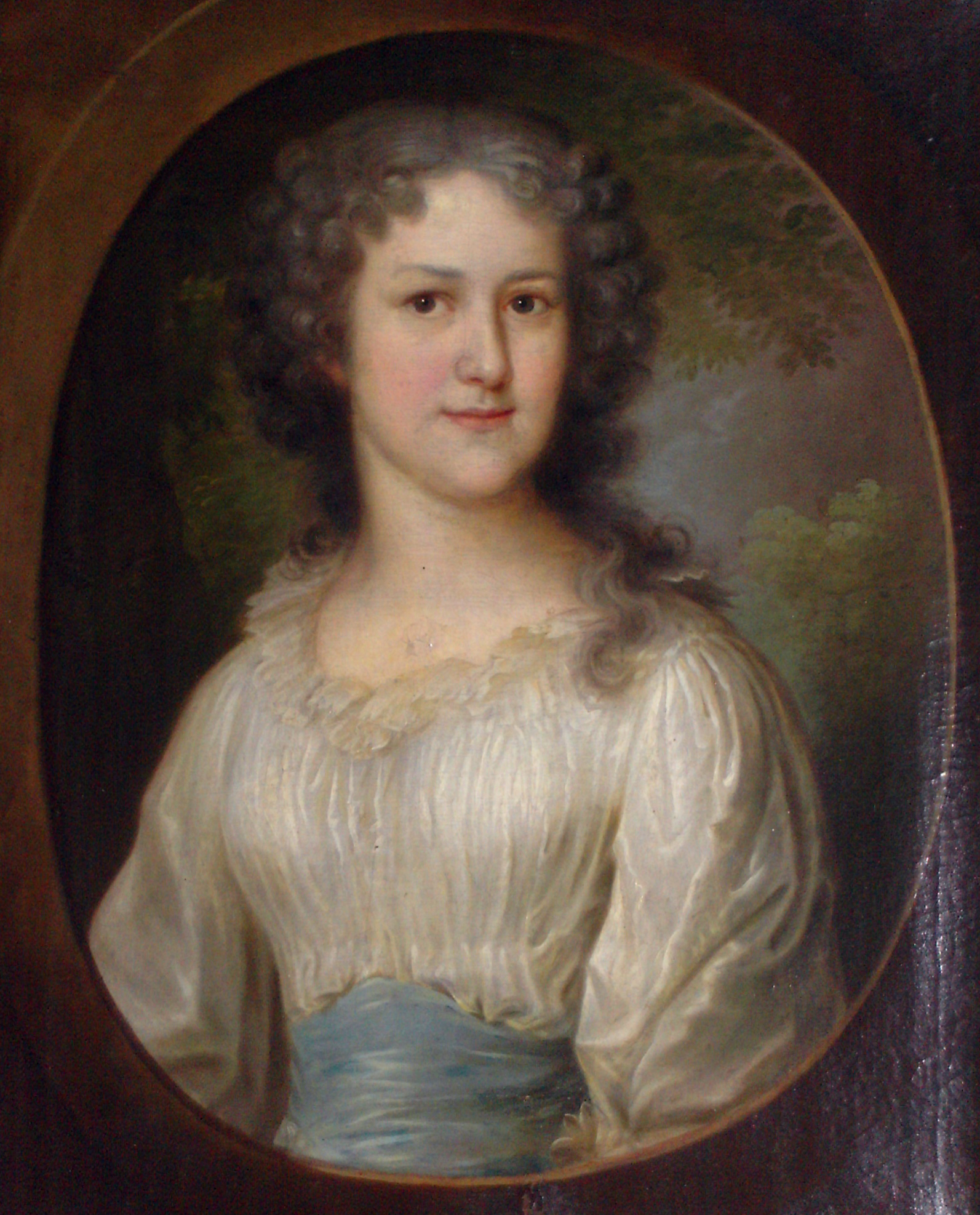
- 1792 portrait

Princess consort of Anhalt-Bernburg-Schaumburg-Hoym
- Tenure: 20 August 1806 - 22 April 1812
- Born: 7 August 1776; Kirchheimbolanden
- Died: 19 February 1841 (aged 64); Schaumburg Castle, near Limburg an der Lahn
- Spouse: Victor II, Prince of Anhalt-Bernburg-Schaumburg-Hoym (m. 1793; died 1812) Baron Frederick of Stein-Liebenstein-Barchfeld (m. 1813)
- Issue: Archduchess Hermine, Palatina of Hungary; Adelheid, Duchess of Oldenburg; Emma, Princess of Waldeck and Pyrmont; Ida, Hereditary Princess of Oldenburg
- House: Nassau-Weilburg
- Father: Charles Christian, Prince of Nassau-Weilburg
- Mother: Princess Carolina of Orange-Nassau

Princess Amelia of Nassau-Weilburg (Amelia Charlotte Wilhelmina Louise; 7 August 1776 in Kirchheimbolanden – 19 February 1841 at Schaumburg Castle, near Limburg an der Lahn) was a Princess of Nassau by birth and by marriage Duchess of Anhalt-Bernburg.

== Background ==
Amelia was the daughter of Charles Christian, Prince of Nassau-Weilburg and his wife the Dutch princess Princess Carolina of Orange-Nassau. Amelia was the 10th of 15 children born to the Prince and Princess of Nassau-Weilburg, as her mother was born a daughter of William IV, Prince of Orange and the English princess Anne, Princess Royal and Princess of Orange a prestigious marriage for Amelia was to be expected. Princess Carolina of Orange-Nassau arranged her engagement in the summer of 1793 to Victor II, Prince of Anhalt-Bernburg-Schaumburg-Hoym.

She had older sisters Maria and Louise and brothers Friedrich Wilhelm and Wilhelm, who died two months later. Later, the family was supplemented by five younger children, of whom son Karl Wilhelm and daughters Caroline and Henrietta reached adulthood.

== Marriage and issue ==
On 29 October 1793, she married in Weilburg to Victor II, Prince of Anhalt-Bernburg-Schaumburg-Hoym. They had four daughters:

- Princess Hermine of Anhalt-Bernburg-Schaumburg-Hoym (2 December 1797 – 14 September 1817), married Archduke Joseph, Palatine of Hungary. They had two children.
- Princess Adelheid of Anhalt-Bernburg-Schaumburg-Hoym (23 February 1800 – 13 September 1820), married Duke Paul Frederick Augustus of Oldenburg. They had two daughters.
- Princess Emma of Anhalt-Bernburg-Schaumburg-Hoym (20 May 1802 – 1 August 1858), married George II, Prince of Waldeck and Pyrmont. They had five children. She became the paternal grandmother of Queen Emma of the Netherlands, who was named after her.
- Princess Ida of Anhalt-Bernburg-Schaumburg-Hoym (10 March 1804 – 31 March 1828), married Duke Paul Frederick Augustus of Oldenburg. They had one son.

After Victor's death in 1812, she married on 15 February 1813 to Baron Frederick of Stein-Liebenstein-Barchfeld.

== Ancestry ==
Ancestors of Amelia of Nassau-Weilburg

16. Frederick, Count of Nassau-Weilburg
8. John Ernst, Count of Nassau-Weilburg
17. Countess Christiane Elisabeth of Sayn-Wittgenstein-Homburg
4. Charles August, Prince of Nassau-Weilburg
18. Frederick Emich, Count of Leiningen-Dagsburg-Hardenburg
9. Countess Maria Polyxena of Leiningen-Dagsburg-Hardenburg
19. Sibylla of Waldeck-Wildungen
2. Charles Christian, Prince of Nassau-Weilburg
20. John, Count of Nassau-Idstein
10. George August, Count of Nassau-Idstein
21. Countess Anna of Leiningen-Dagsburg-Falkenburg
5. Princess Auguste Friederike of Nassau-Idstein
22. Albert Ernest I, Count of Oettingen-Oettingen
11. Princess Henriette Dorothea of Oettingen-Oettingen
23. Duchess Christine Fredericka of Württemberg
1. Amelia of Nassau-Weilburg
24. Henry Casimir II, Prince of Nassau-Dietz
12. John William Friso, Prince of Orange
25. Princess Henriëtte Amalia of Anhalt-Dessau
6. William IV, Prince of Orange
26. Charles I, Landgrave of Hesse-Kassel
13. Landgravine Marie Louise of Hesse-Kassel
27. Maria Amalia of Courland
3. Princess Carolina of Orange-Nassau
28. George I of Great Britain
14. George II of Great Britain
29. Sophia Dorothea of Celle
7. Anne, Princess Royal
30. John Frederick, Margrave of Brandenburg-Ansbach
15. Caroline of Ansbach
31. Princess Eleonore Erdmuthe of Saxe-Eisenach
