= Princess Ida of Anhalt-Bernburg-Schaumburg-Hoym =

Princess Ida
- Hereditary Princess of Oldenburg
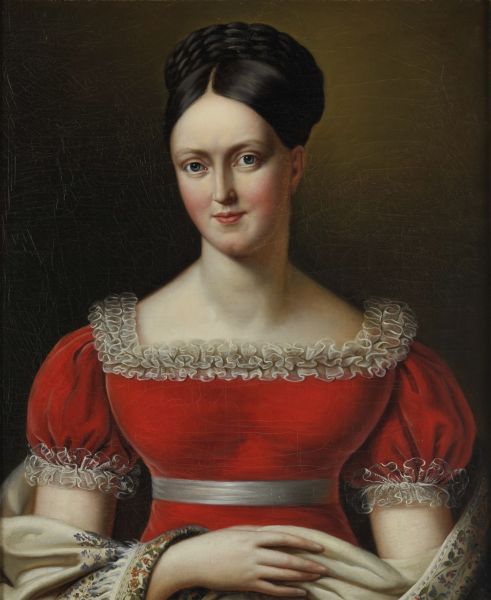
- Born: 10 March 1804; Schaumburg-Castle, Rhineland-Palatinate
- Died: 31 March 1828 (aged 24); Oldenburg
- Spouse: Paul Frederick Augustus, Hereditary Prince of Oldenburg (m. 1825)
- Issue: Peter II, Grand Duke of Oldenburg
- House: Ascania
- Father: Victor II, Prince of Anhalt-Bernburg-Schaumburg-Hoym
- Mother: Amelia of Nassau-Weilburg

Princess Ida of Anhalt-Bernburg-Schaumburg-Hoym (German: Prinzessin Ida von Anhalt-Bernburg-Schaumburg-Hoym; 10 March 1804 – 31 March 1828) was a princess of Anhalt-Bernburg-Schaumburg-Hoym by birth as the daughter of Victor II, Prince of Anhalt-Bernburg-Schaumburg-Hoym. As the wife of Hereditary Prince Paul Frederick Augustus of Oldenburg, she became an Hereditary Princess of Oldenburg by marriage.

== Birth and family ==
Princess Ida, born on 10 March 1804 at Schaumburg Castle, was the fourth and youngest daughter of Victor II, Prince of Anhalt-Bernburg-Schaumburg-Hoym, and of Princess Amelia of Nassau-Weilburg. Ida had three older sisters: Hermine, Adelheid, and Emma. She grew up with her sisters in Hoym in Anhalt.

== Marriage ==
Ida married Hereditary Prince Paul Frederick Augustus of Oldenburg on 24 June 1825 at Oldenburg. He was the eldest son of Peter, Reigning Duke of Oldenburg, and had previously been married to Ida's older sister Adelheid.

The princess was just 21 years old when she married the 41-year-old duke. Augustus and Ida had one son, Peter, who was born in 1827 and would later succeed Augustus as Grand Duke.

== Death ==
Just like her sister, Princess Ida died after three years of marriage, in 1828.

Augustus became Grand Duke of Oldenburg in 1829. In 1831, he married for the third time to Princess Cecilia of Sweden.

The settlement Idafehn in East Frisia in Lower Saxony, Germany is named after Princess Ida.

== Ancestry ==
Ancestors of Princess Ida of Anhalt-Bernburg-Schaumburg-Hoym

16. Lebrecht, Prince of Anhalt-Zeitz-Hoym
8. Victor I, Prince of Anhalt-Bernburg-Schaumburg-Hoym
17. Charlotte of Nassau-Dillenburg
4. Karl Louis, Prince of Anhalt-Bernburg-Schaumburg-Hoym
18. William Maurice, Count of Isenburg-Büdingen-Birstein
9. Charlotte Louise of Isenburg-Büdingen-Birstein
19. Anna Amalia of Isenburg-Büdingen
2. Victor II, Prince of Anhalt-Bernburg-Schaumburg-Hoym
20. William Maurice, Count of Solms-Braunfels
10. Frederick William I, Prince of Solm-Braunfels
21. Magdalene Sophie of Hesse-Homburg
5. Amalie Eleonore of Solm-Braunfels
22. Carl Otto, Count of Solms-Laubach
11. Sophie of Solm-Laubach
23. Louise Albertine of Schönburg-Waldenburg
1. Ida of Anhalt-Bernburg-Schaumburg-Hoym
24. John Ernest, Prince of Nassau-Weilburg
12. Charles August, Prince of Nassau-Weilburg
25. Maria Polyxena of Leiningen-Dagsburg-Hartenburg
6. Charles Christian, Prince of Nassau-Weilburg
26. George August, Count of Nassau-Idstein
13. Auguste Friederike of Nassau-Saarbrücken-Idstein
27. Henriette Dorothea of Oettingen-Oettingen
3. Amelia of Nassau-Weilburg
28. John William Friso, Prince of Orange
14. William IV, Prince of Orange
29. Marie Louise of Hesse-Kassel
7. Carolina of Orange-Nassau
30. George II of Great Britain
15. Anne of Great Britain
31. Caroline of Brandenburg-Ansbach

== Issue ==
| Name | Birth | Death | Notes |
|---|---|---|---|
| Duke Peter of Oldenburg | 8 July 1827 | 13 June 1900 | succeeded his father as Grand Duke of Oldenburg; married Princess Elisabeth of Saxe-Altenburg; had issue |
