= Peter I of Oldenburg =

Grand Duke of Oldenburg from 1823 to 1829

Peter I
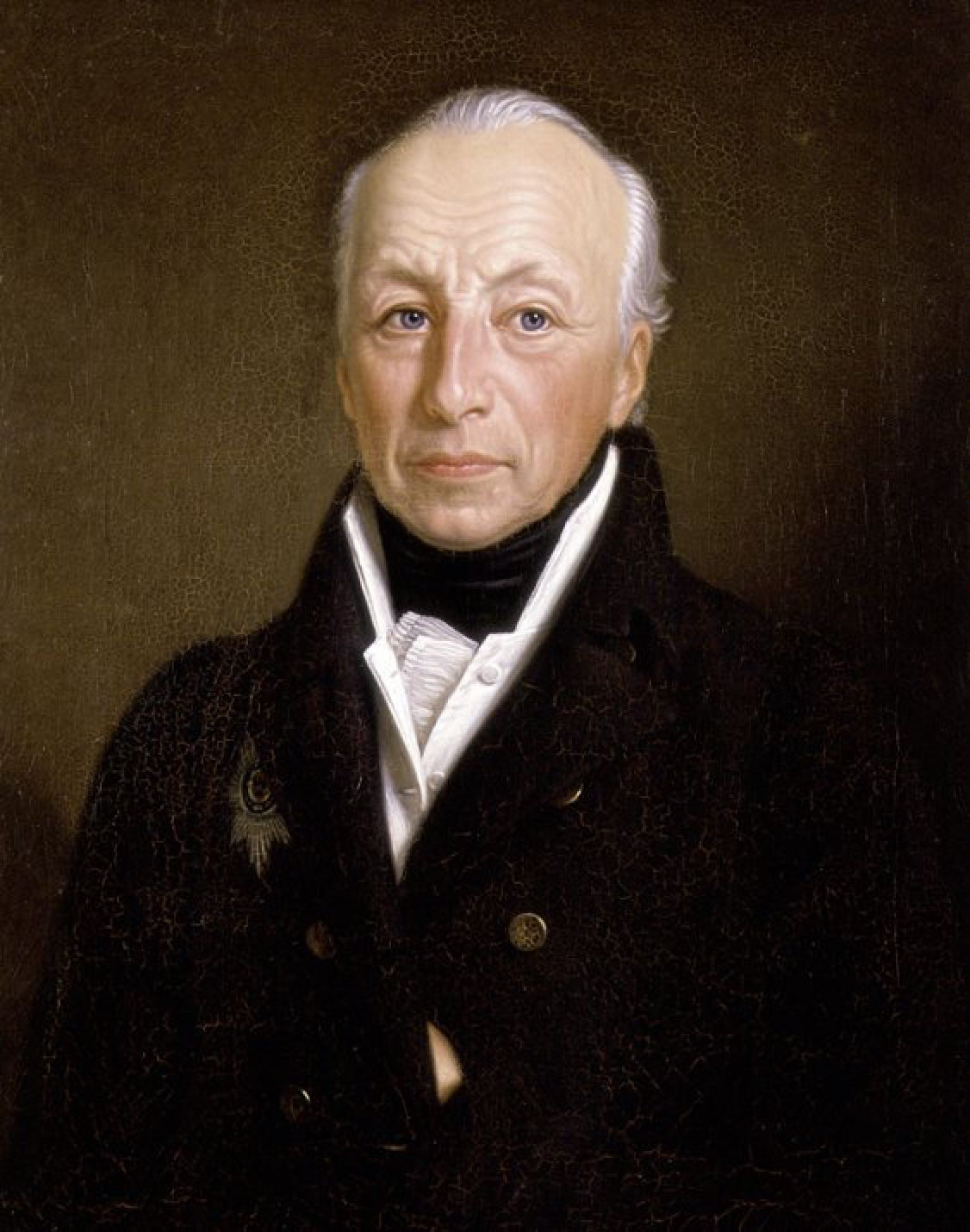
- Portrait c. 1819

Grand Duke of Oldenburg
- Reign: 2 July 1823 – 21 May 1829
- Predecessor: William I
- Successor: Augustus I
- Born: 17 January 1755; Riesenburg, Prussia (now Poland)
- Died: 21 May 1829 (aged 74); Wiesbaden, Duchy of Nassau (now Germany)
- Burial: Ducal Mausoleum, Gertrudenfriedhof, Oldenburg
- Spouse: Duchess Frederica of Württemberg (m. 1781; died 1785)
- Issue: Augustus I; Duke George
Names
- German: Peter Friedrich Ludwig
- House: House of Holstein-Gottorp
- Father: Prince Georg Ludwig of Holstein-Gottorp
- Mother: Princess Sophie Charlotte of Schleswig-Holstein-Sonderburg-Beck
- Religion: Lutheranism

Peter I or Peter Frederick Louis of Holstein-Gottorp (German: Peter Friedrich Ludwig von Holstein-Gottorp) (17 January 1755 – 21 May 1829) was the Regent of the Duchy of Oldenburg for his incapacitated cousin William I from 1785 to 1823, and then served himself as Duke from 1823 to 1829.

He also served from 1785 to 1803 as the last Lutheran Prince-Bishop of Lübeck, until that Prince-Bishopric was secularized and joined to Oldenburg. His son, Augustus, was the first Duke of Oldenburg to use the style of Grand Duke that was granted in 1815.

== Early life ==
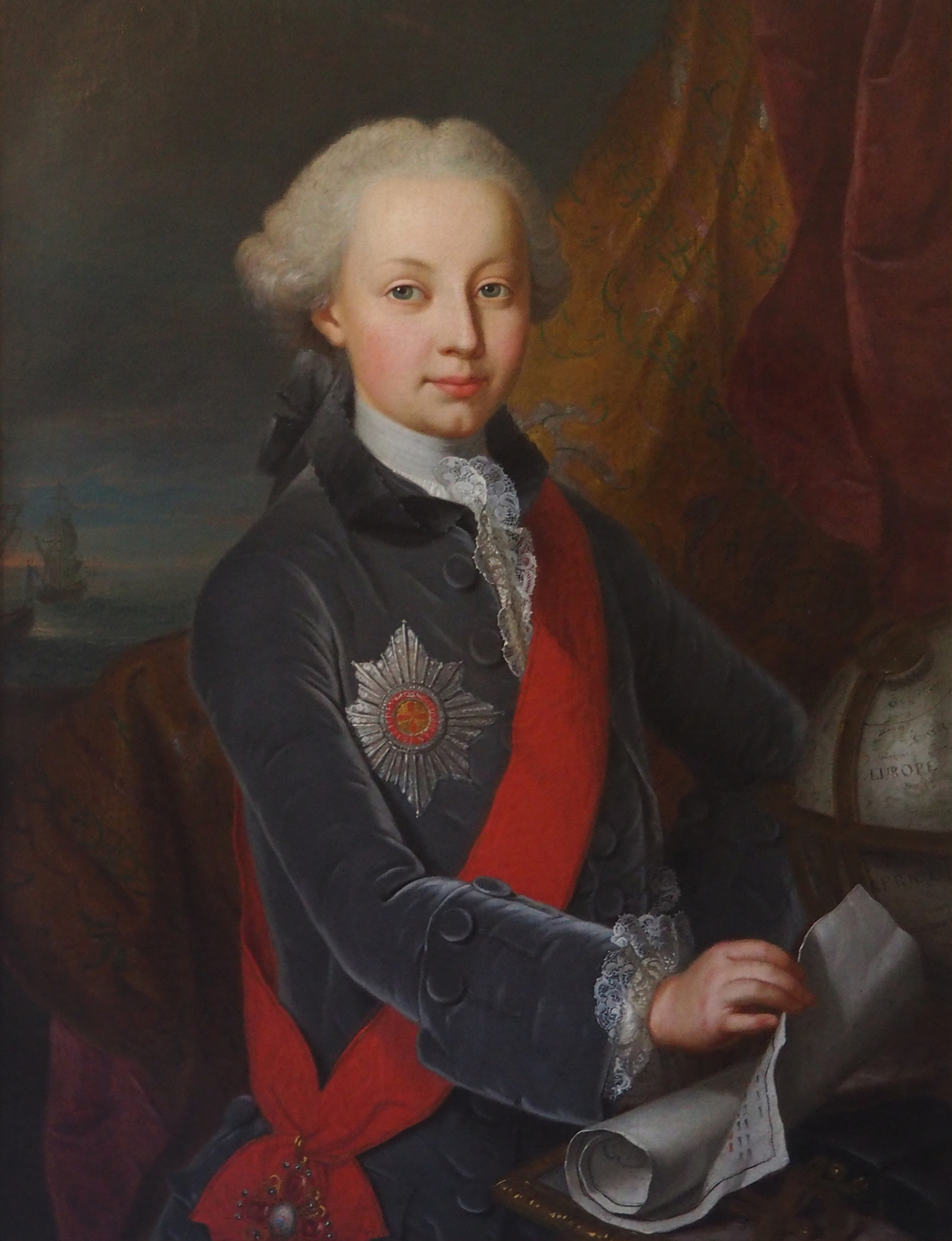
Portrait of a young Peter by Jakob Emanuel Handmann, 1766

Peter Frederick Louis was born on 17 January 1755 at Riesenburg, Prussia. He was the only surviving son of Prince Georg Ludwig of Holstein-Gottorp and Sophie Charlotte of Schleswig-Holstein-Sonderburg-Beck.

== Marriage and issue ==
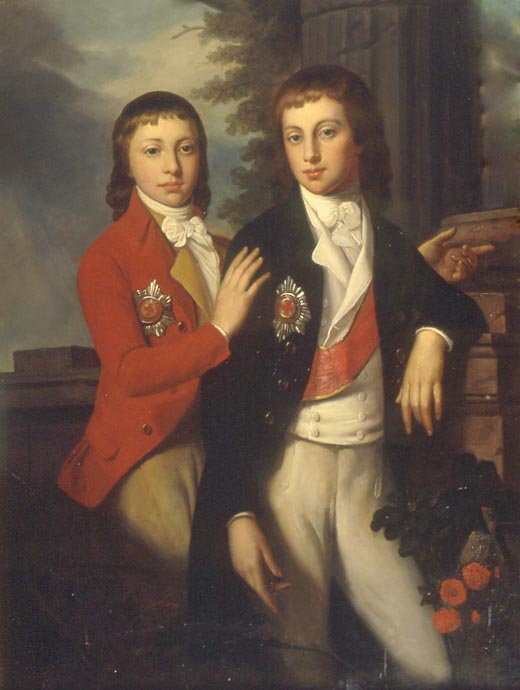
Peter I's sons, Duke August and Duke Georg, 1790s.

On 6 June 1781, he married Duchess Frederica of Württemberg, the second daughter of Frederick II Eugene, Duke of Württemberg and Friederike Dorothea of Brandenburg-Schwedt. Frederica's sister, Sophie, was the wife of Tsarevich Paul of Russia (the future Emperor Paul I). They became the parents of two sons:

Name	Birth	Death	Notes
Paul Friedrich August, Grand Duke of Oldenburg	13 July 1783	27 February 1853	married firstly Princess Adelheid of Anhalt-Bernburg-Schaumburg-Hoym; had issue, including Amalia of Oldenburg who became Queen consort of Greece; secondly, he married Princess Ida of Anhalt-Bernburg-Schaumburg-Hoym; had issue; thirdly, he married Princess Cecilia of Sweden; had issue.
Duke Georg Peter Friedrich of Oldenburg	9 May 1784	27 December 1812	married Grand Duchess Catherine Pavlovna of Russia; had issue.

Fredericka died due to complications from a miscarriage on 24 November 1785 at Vienna, Austria, predeceasing her husband by 40 years.

== Later life and succession ==
He was appointed Regent of the Duchy of Oldenburg for his incapacitated cousin Peter Frederick William in 1785.

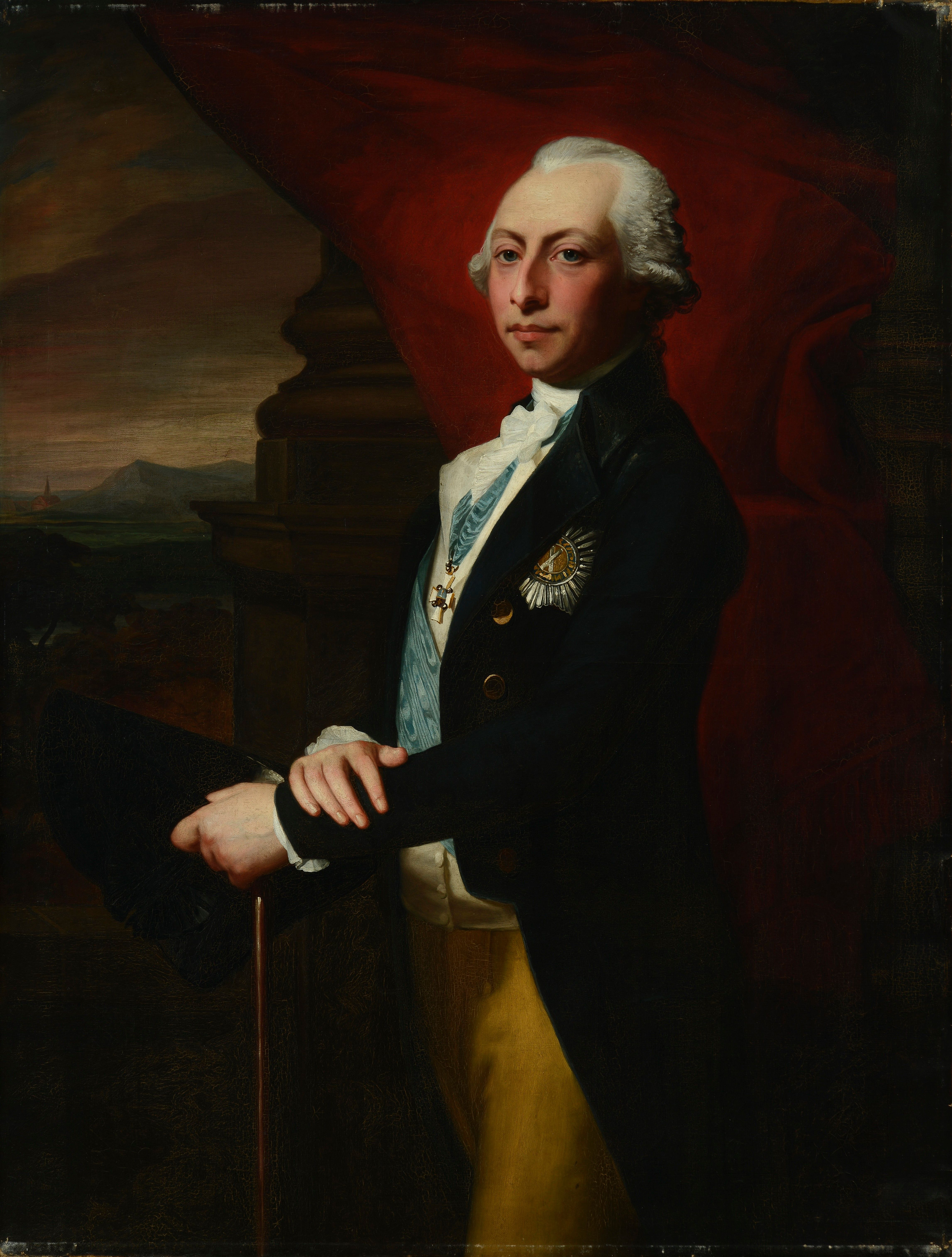
Portrait of Peter as Prince-Bishop of Lübeck by Jean-Laurent Mosnier, 1798

From 1785 until 1803, he also served as the last Lutheran Prince-Bishop of Lübeck, until that Prince-Bishopric was secularized as the Principality of Lübeck and joined to Oldenburg.

Following the death of Wilhelm in 1823, he himself became reigning Duke of Oldenburg. Although the Duchy of Oldenburg had been elevated to a Grand Duchy in 1815, he refrained from using the title of Grand Duke. His son, Augustus, was the first Duke of Oldenburg to use the style of Grand Duke.

Peter I died on 21 May 1829 in Wiesbaden. He was buried in the Ducal Mausoleum in the Churchyard of Saint Gertrude in Oldenburg. He was succeeded by his eldest son, Paul Friedrich August, as Grand Duke, the first of the House of Holstein-Gottorp to use the elevated style.

== Ancestry ==
Ancestors of Peter I of Oldenburg

8. Christian Albert, Duke of Holstein-Gottorp
4. Christian August of Holstein-Gottorp, Prince of Eutin
9. Princess Frederica Amalia of Denmark
2. Prince George Louis of Holstein-Gottorp
10. Frederick VII, Margrave of Baden-Durlach
5. Margravine Albertina Frederica of Baden-Durlach
11. Princess Augusta Marie of Holstein-Gottorp
1. Peter I, Grand Duke of Oldenburg
12. Frederick Louis, Duke of Schleswig-Holstein-Sonderburg-Beck
6. Frederick William II, Duke of Schleswig-Holstein-Sonderburg-Beck
13. Princess Louise Charlotte of Schleswig-Holstein-Sonderburg-Augustenburg
3. Princess Sophie Charlotte of Schleswig-Holstein-Sonderburg-Beck
14. Christopher I, Burgrave and Count of Dohna-Schlodien
7. Burgravine and Countess Ursula Anna of Dohna-Schlodien-Carwinden
15. Burgravine and Countess Friederike Marie of Dohna

Peter I of Oldenburg House of Holstein-Gottorp Cadet branch of the House of Oldenburg Born: 17 January 1755 Died: 21 May 1829
Regnal titles
Preceded by Frederick August I of Oldenburg as Lutheran administrator	Prince-Bishop of Lübeck; 1785–1803 (Lutheran administrator)	Secularized
Preceded by William I	Grand Duke of Oldenburg; 1823–1829	Succeeded by Augustus I
