= Victor II of Anhalt-Bernburg-Schaumburg-Hoym =

Victor II Karl Frederick
- Prince of Anhalt-Bernburg-Schaumburg-Hoym
- Born: 2 November 1767; Schaumburg
- Died: 22 April 1812 (aged 44); Schaumburg
- Spouse: Amelia of Nassau-Weilburg (m. 1793)
- Issue: Hermine, Archduchess of Austria; Adelheid, Duchess of Oldenburg; Emma, Princess of Waldeck and Pyrmont; Ida, Hereditary Princess of Oldenburg
- House: Ascania
- Father: Karl Louis, Prince of Anhalt-Bernburg-Schaumburg-Hoym
- Mother: Amalie Eleonore of Solms-Braunfels

Victor II Karl Frederick of Anhalt-Bernburg-Schaumburg-Hoym (Schaumburg, 2 November 1767 – Schaumburg, 22 April 1812), was a German prince of the House of Ascania from the Anhalt-Bernburg branch and a ruler of the principality of Anhalt-Bernburg-Schaumburg-Hoym.

He was the eldest son of Karl Louis, Prince of Anhalt-Bernburg-Schaumburg-Hoym, by his second wife Amalie Eleonore, daughter of Frederick William, Prince of Solms-Braunfels.

== Life ==
Victor Karl Frederick succeeded his father in Anhalt-Bernburg-Schaumburg-Hoym upon his death in 1806.

During most of his reign he was in conflict with his half-uncle Frederick over the government of the principality. Frederick claimed that primogeniture was never formally installed in Anhalt-Bernburg-Schaumburg-Hoym and in consequence, he had rights to rule jointly with Victor Karl Frederick. However, on his death after only six years of reign and without male issue, Victor Karl Frederick was finally succeeded by his uncle.

== Marriage and issue ==
In Weilburg on 29 October 1793, Victor Karl Frederick married Princess Amelia of Nassau-Weilburg, then of Nassau (b. Kirchheimbolanden, 7 August 1776 - d. Schaumburg, 19 February 1841), daughter of Charles Christian, Prince of Nassau-Weilburg, and through her mother, Princess Carolina, a great-granddaughter of King George II of Great Britain. They had four daughters:

1. Hermine (b. Hoym, 2 December 1797 - d. Budapest, 14 September 1817), married on 30 August 1815 to Archduke Joseph of Austria, Palatine of Hungary.
2. Adelheid (b. Hoym, 23 February 1800 - d. Oldenburg, 13 September 1820), married on 24 July 1817 to Hereditary Grand Duke Paul Frederick August of Oldenburg.
3. Emma (b. Schaumburg, 20 May 1802 - d. Pyrmont, 1 August 1858), married on 26 June 1823 to George II of Waldeck-Pyrmont.
4. Ida (b. Schaumburg, 10 March 1804 - d. Oldenburg, 31 March 1828), married on 24 June 1825 to Hereditary Grand Duke Paul Frederick August of Oldenburg, widow of her sister.

== Bibliography ==
- Ferdinand Siebigk: Das Herzogthum Anhalt, p. 243, Dessau, 1867

Victor II of Anhalt-Bernburg-Schaumburg-Hoym House of Ascania Born: 2 November 1767 Died: 22 April 1812
| Preceded by Karl Louis | Prince of Anhalt-Bernburg-Schaumburg-Hoym; 1806–1812 | Succeeded by Frederick |
