= Jakob von Washington =

Bavarian general (1778–1848)

Jakob von Washington KCB
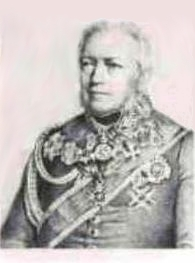
- Born: 26 January 1778
- Died: 5 April 1848 (aged 70)
- Military career
- Allegiance: Dutch Republic; Kingdom of Bavaria
- Branch: (Dutch Republic) Dutch States Army; Bavarian Army
- Rank: Lieutenant General
- Conflicts: French Revolutionary Wars; Napoleonic Wars

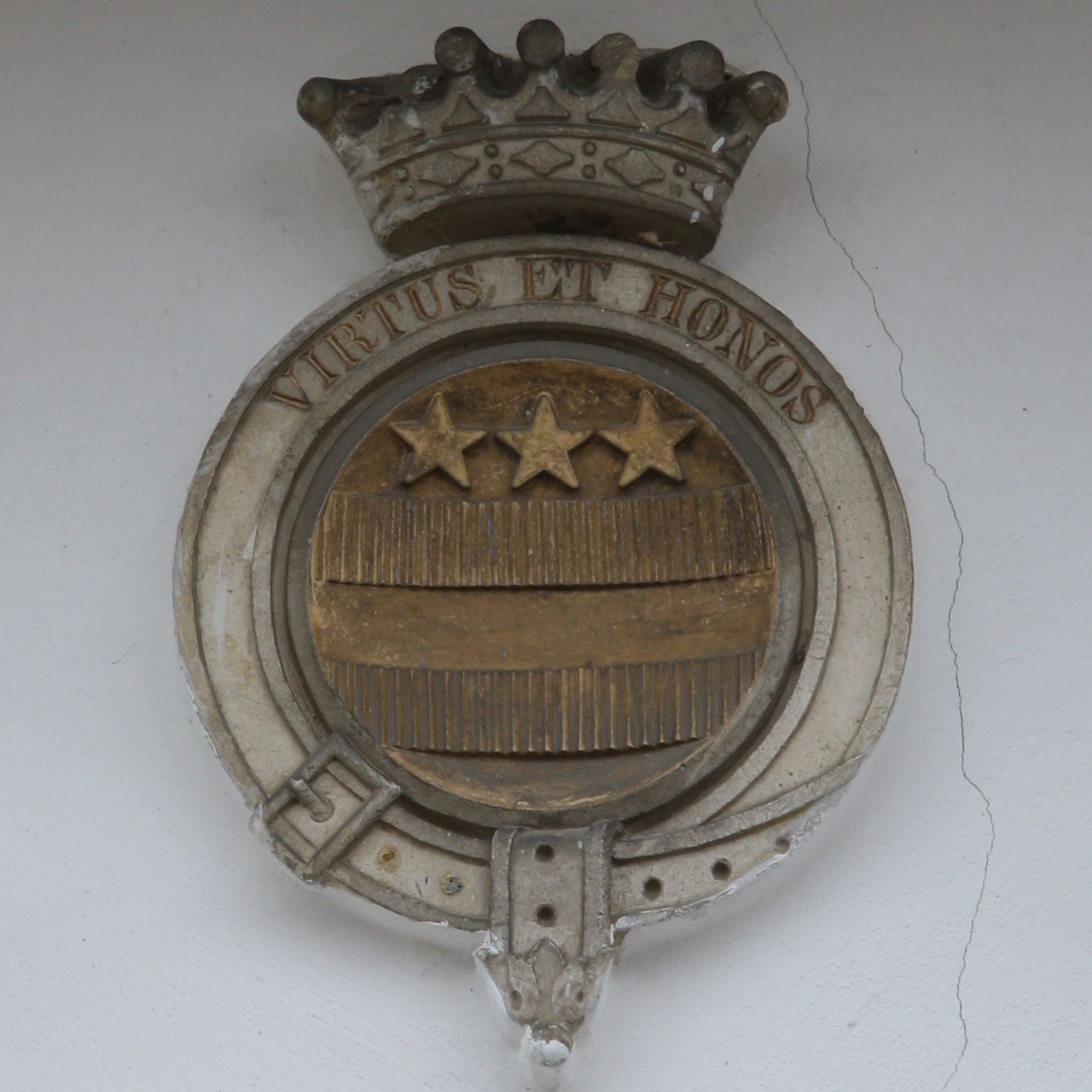
The Von Washington Coat of arms.

Baron Jacobus von Washington KCB (26 January 1778 – 5 April 1848) was a lieutenant general in the Bavarian Army and a distant relative of US President George Washington. Born in The Hague, Netherlands, he was christened James Washington. Most of his adult life was shaped by his participation in wars for and against Napoleonic France and his service to Ludwig I of Bavaria.

== Origins ==
The known history of the Washington family goes back to the 12th century. Sir Robert Washington (d. 1324) was the progenitor of the branch of the family residing in Sulgrave Manor, England. One of his descendants, John Washington, emigrated to Virginia in 1656 and was the great-grandfather of George Washington. The brother of Sir Robert, Sir John Washington (died 1331), founded the Hallhead Hall/Adwick-le-street branch of the Washingtons. His descendant, James Washington, accompanied John Washington to Virginia, but returned to England, then shortly thereafter emigrated to Rotterdam, the Netherlands. There he married a Dutchwoman named Clara van der Lauen, leading, five generations later, to Jacobus Washington.

== Early life ==
On 2 February 1777, Daniel Washington, aged 46 and a military solicitor, married Elisabeth Cornelia Hoogstad. Jacobus was born on 26 January 1778. His only sibling, Daniel, was born 27 July 1781. Their father died in October 1786, and their mother in September 1789, leaving them orphaned at 11 and 8 years old. Little is known of their lives for some years after. Daniel remained in the Netherlands, married in 1808, and died in 1813, apparently without children.

== Military career ==
In 1794, aged 16, Jacobus Washington joined the Dutch Army. When the French invaded later that year he fought against them. His lot under French domination in the new Batavian Republic was not a happy one. In 1799, in a letter to George Washington, Jacobus offered his services to the United States in its undeclared Quasi-War with France, but was turned down due to his inexperience. He then moved to the Kingdom of Bavaria, where he joined the Bavarian Army. He came to the attention of Crown Prince Ludwig, who made Jakob his adjutant. In July 1807 Jakob was present at the negotiations for the Treaties of Tilsit following the victory of the French Empire (of which Bavaria was now an ally) over Russia. Over the next few years he advanced to the rank of colonel.

In October 1813, Bavaria switched sides and joined the Allies against France. On 7 June 1815 in Brussels, Jakob Washington signed a treaty with the Duke of Wellington representing Bavaria. On the night of 15 June 1815, prior to the Battle of Quatre Bras, Washington was an invited guest at the now famous Duchess of Richmond's ball. He fought in the Battle of Waterloo, the only Bavarian officer to do so, since the rest of the Bavarians were held in reserve in Saarbrücken.

In 1825, Ludwig became King of Bavaria as Ludwig I. Washington's career continued apace, rising eventually to lieutenant general. On 8 December 1829, Ludwig made him Freiherr (Baron) von Washington. Ludwig also appointed him Grand Chamberlain and Marshal of his military household. In 1843, on a visit to London, Queen Victoria dubbed him a Knight Commander of the Order of the Bath.

== Family ==
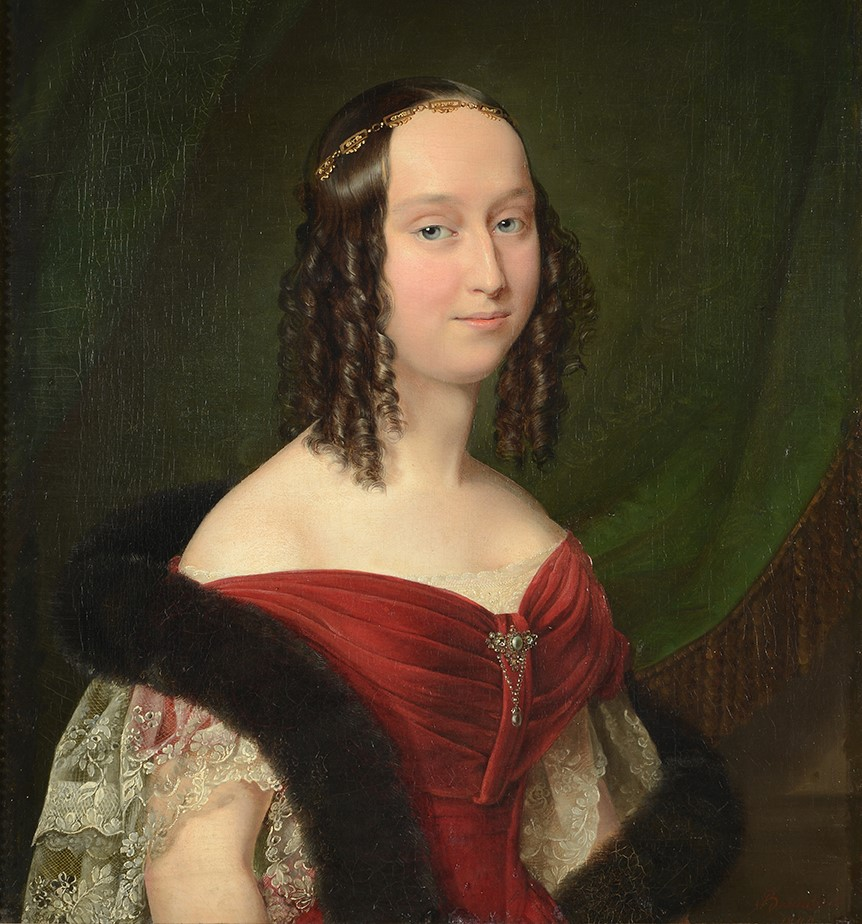
Duchess Frederica of Oldenburg

Washington's first wife was Baroness Antonie van Löchner (born Baroness von Verger) (1788–1830), a wealthy widow. They had two sons, Ludwig Carl August Maximilian Gerhardt (1827–1845) and Maximilian Emanuel Willibald Bernhard Johann Gerhard von Washington (1829–1903). After her death, he married Baroness Caroline Segesser von Brunegg (1802–1841) in 1833. Through this marriage he gained the Castle Notzing, near the town of Erding, Bavaria. They had a son, Carl Theodor Albrecht Sigmund Jacob Gerhardt von Washington (1833–1897). Baron Jakob von Washington died in Notzing on 5 April 1848.

Maximilian Emanuel also became Grand Chamberlain, married Duchess Frederica of Oldenburg (sister of Queen Amalia of Greece), and had two sons, one of whom, named Peter Elimar Otto Karl George, served in the 11th Hussars of the Austro-Hungarian army reaching the rank of captain. However, despite reports to the contrary, he did not fight during the First World War, having retired before the War started. Both sons died without issue, and since none of Jakob's other children had any offspring, the von Washington line became extinct.
