= Princess Cecilia of Sweden (1807–1844) =

Grand Duchess of Oldenburg from 1831 to 1844

Princess Cecilia
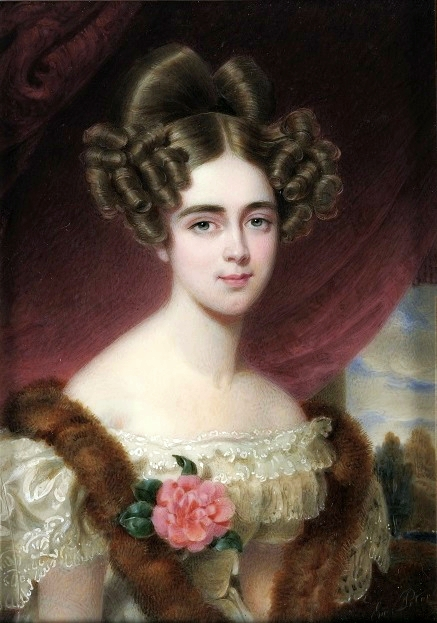

Grand Duchess consort of Oldenburg
- Tenure: 5 May 1831 – 27 January 1844
- Born: 22 June 1807; Stockholm, Sweden
- Died: 27 January 1844 (aged 36); Oldenburg
- Burial: Ducal (Herzogliches) Mausoleum, Gertrudenfriedhof, Oldenburg
- Spouse: Augustus, Grand Duke of Oldenburg (m. 1831)
- Issue: Duke Alexander; Duke Nikolaus; Duke Elimar
- House: Holstein-Gottorp
- Father: Gustav IV Adolf of Sweden
- Mother: Frederica of Baden

Cecilia of Sweden (22 June 1807 – 27 January 1844) was a composer, a Swedish princess by birth, and Grand Duchess of Oldenburg by marriage. She was the daughter of King Gustav IV Adolf of Sweden and Frederica of Baden.

== Biography ==
After birth, she was raised under the supervision of the royal governess Charlotte Stierneld. The youngest of four children, Cecilia left Sweden in 1810 with her family after her father was deposed as king of Sweden by the Coup of 1809. She was raised in her mother's home country, the Grand Duchy of Baden (Germany). After her parents were divorced in 1812, she was raised mainly by her grandmother Amalie of Hesse-Darmstadt in Bruchsal.

She met Augustus, Grand Duke of Oldenburg in 1830, and after an hour's conversation, the marriage was decided. She went to her brother in Vienna, where her wedding took place in the presence of the Austrian Emperor Francis I. She relocated to the city of Oldenburg in June 1831.

Cecilia had an interest in culture. As Grand Duchess of Oldenburg she composed the melody of a hymn for Oldenburg. The hymn was later added with lyrics by Theodor von Kobbe and named ‘Heil dir, o Oldenburg’. In 1833, Cecila supported the founding of the city's first theatre, which today is the Oldenburgisches Staatstheater. She was, however, never known to be close to the population in Oldenburg, where she lived a life confined to the circles of the court. A bridge, a square and a road are named after her, as well as a school. In honour of the late Cecilia, the locality Cäciliengroden at the Jade Bight near Wilhelmshaven (later incorporated into Sande in Frisia) was named after her.

Cecilia died at the age of 36 from puerperal fever, a few days after giving birth to her third child Elimar. She was buried in the Ducal Mausoleum in the Churchyard of St. Gertrude in the city of Oldenburg. Her sister Amalia Maria Charlotta was also buried there.

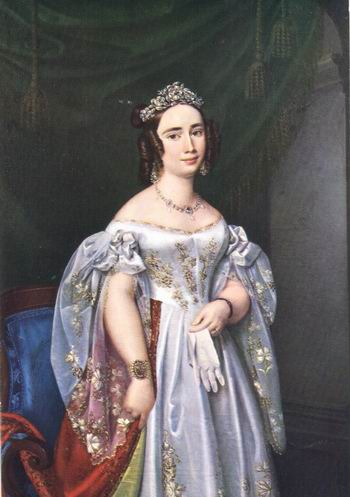
Cecilia as Grand Duchess of Oldenburg

=== Marriage ===
She married Augustus, Grand Duke of Oldenburg on 5 May 1831 in Vienna. Both being members of the House of Holstein-Gottorp and descendants of Christian August of Holstein-Gottorp, Prince of Eutin, they were distant cousins. It was Augustus' third marriage.

They had three sons:

- Alexander Friedrich Gustav (16 June 1834 – 6 June 1835)
- Nikolaus Friedrich August (15 February 1836 – 30 April 1837)
- Anton Günther Friedrich Elimar (23 January 1844 – 17 October 1895)

== Ancestry ==
Ancestors of Princess Cecilia of Sweden (1807–1844)

8. Adolf Frederick, King of Sweden
4. Gustav III of Sweden
9. Louisa Ulrika of Prussia
2. Gustav IV Adolf of Sweden
10. Frederick V of Denmark
5. Sophia Magdalena of Denmark
11. Louise of Great Britain
1. Princess Cecilia of Sweden
12. Charles Frederick, Grand Duke of Baden
6. Charles Louis, Hereditary Prince of Baden
13. Landgravine Caroline Louise of Hesse-Darmstadt
3. Frederica of Baden
14. Louis IX, Landgrave of Hesse-Darmstadt
7. Princess Amalie of Hesse-Darmstadt
15. Countess Palatine Caroline of Zweibrücken

Princess Cecilia of Sweden (1807–1844) House of Holstein-Gottorp Born: 22 June 1807 Died: 27 January 1844
German royalty
Vacant Title last held by Princess Ulrike Friederike Wilhelmine of Hesse-Kassel as Duchess of Oldenburg	Grand Duchess consort of Oldenburg; 5 May 1831 – 27 January 1844	Vacant Title next held by Princess Elisabeth of Saxe-Altenburg
