= Christian Herzog von Oldenburg =

Head of the Grand Ducal Family of Oldenburg

Christian

Head of House of Oldenburg
- Tenure: 20 September 2014 – present
- Predecessor: Anton Günther, Duke of Oldenburg
- Heir apparent: Alexander of Oldenburg
- Born: 1 February 1955 (age 71); Rastede, Lower Saxony, West Germany
- Spouse: Countess Caroline zu Rantzau (m. 1987)
- Issue: Alexander of Oldenburg; Philipp of Oldenburg; Anton of Oldenburg; Katharina of Oldenburg
Names
- Christian Nikolaus Udo Peter
- House: Holstein-Gottorp
- Father: Anton-Günther, Duke of Oldenburg
- Mother: Princess Ameli of Löwenstein-Wertheim-Freudenberg
- Religion: Lutheran

Christian Nikolaus Udo Peter Herzog von Oldenburg (born 1 February 1955) is the head of the Grand Ducal Family of Oldenburg.

== Family and life ==
Oldenburg was born in Rastede, Lower Saxony, the only son of Duke Anton-Günther of Oldenburg and his wife Princess Ameli of Löwenstein-Wertheim-Freudenberg (b. 1923). Oldenburg has an elder sister, Duchess Helene (b. 1953) who is unmarried. Oldenburg has a diploma in Business.

Oldenburg is a great-grandson of the last Grand Duke of Oldenburg to reign, Frederick Augustus II and through his mother he is related to the Princes of Löwenstein-Wertheim-Freudenberg, who belong to a morganatic branch of the House of Wittelsbach descending from Frederick I, Elector Palatine.

Oldenburg became heir to the headship of the Grand Ducal family on 3 April 1970 when his grandfather Hereditary Grand Duke Nikolaus died. According to his father's obituary issued by the family his ancestral titles (however not all part of his official German surname) are: HRH The Duke of Oldenburg, Heir in Norway, Duke of Schleswig, Holstein, Stormarn, Dithmarschen and Oldenburg, Prince of Lübeck and Birkenfeld, Lord of Jever and Knyphausen.

The ancestral home of the House of Oldenburg is Oldenburg castle, nowadays a museum owned by the state. Present seats of the Duke of Oldenburg are Rastede Palace near Oldenburg and Güldenstein Manor, Harmsdorf, in Schleswig-Holstein. Eutin Castle in Schleswig-Holstein is a museum owned by a family foundation set up by his father.

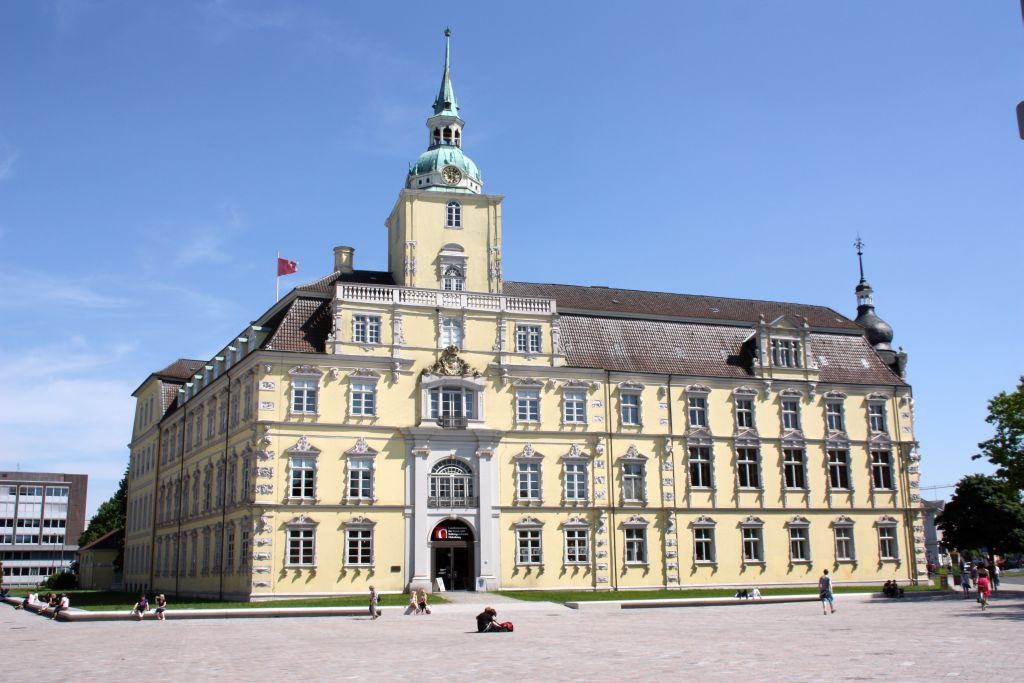
Schloss Oldenburg

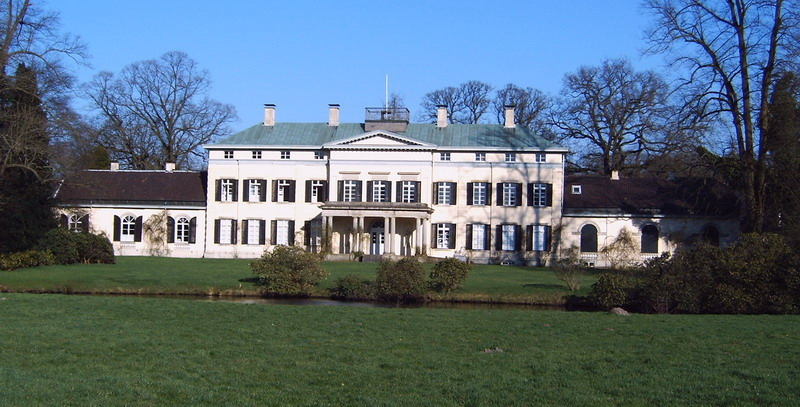
Rastede Palace

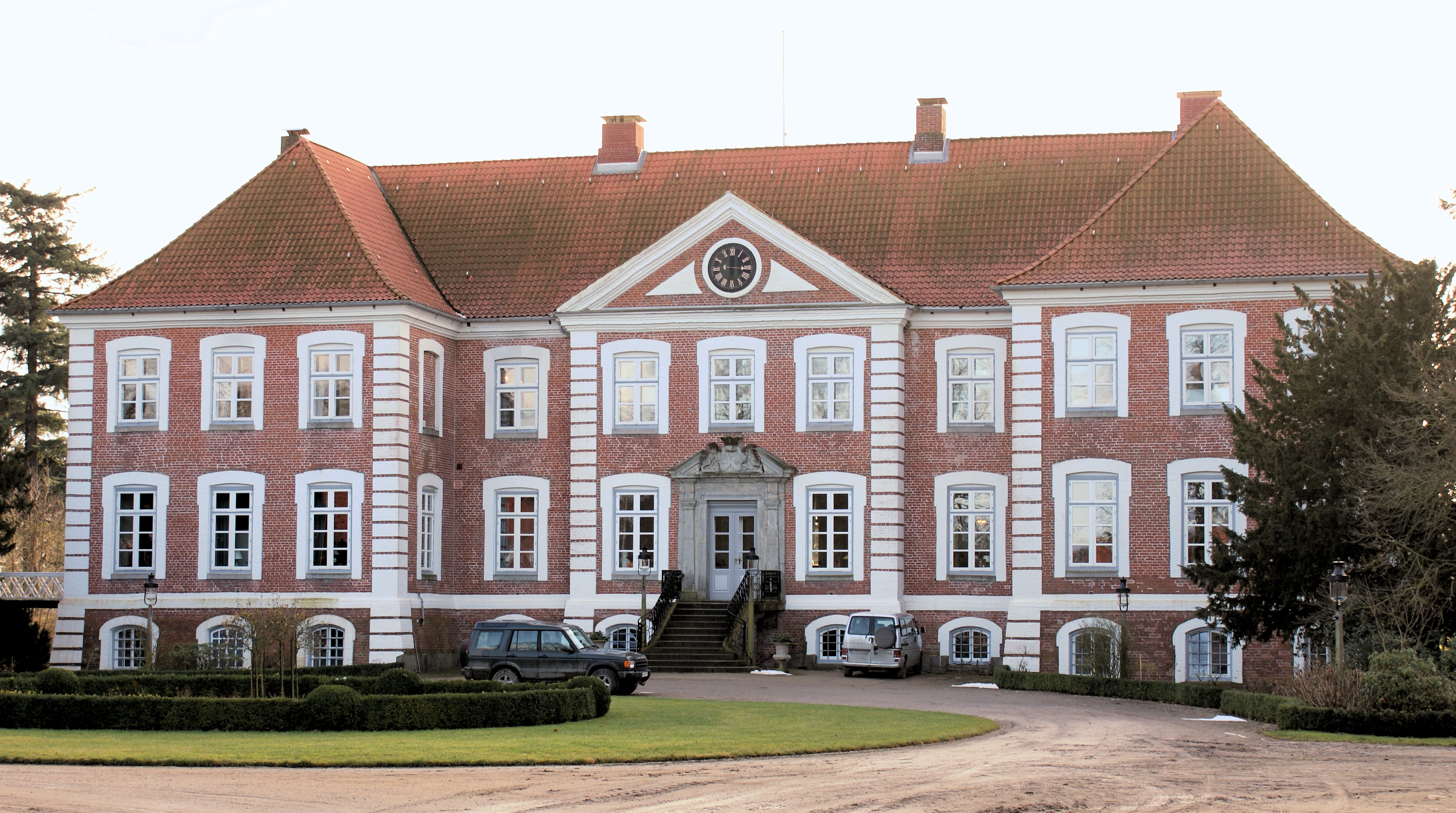
Güldenstein Manor, Harmsdorf

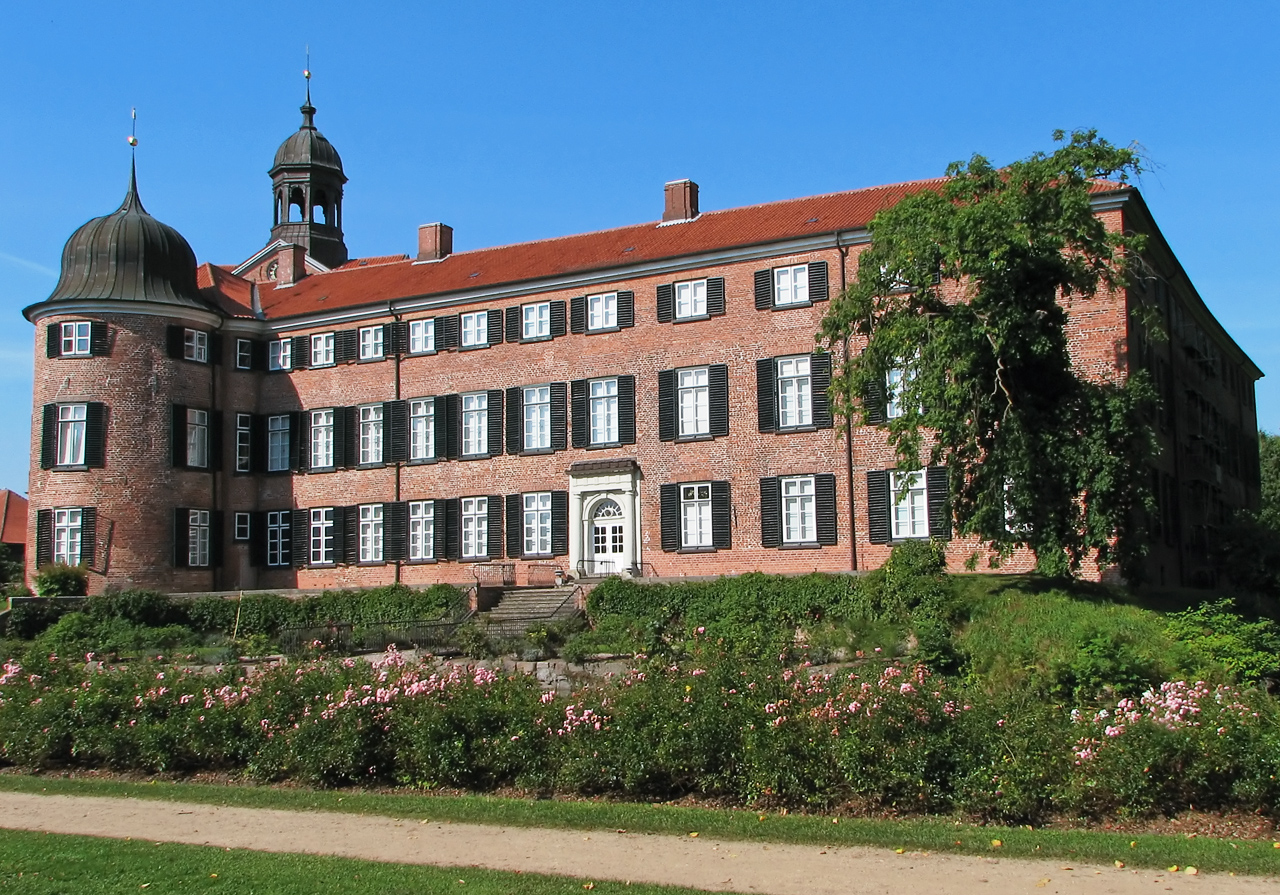
Eutin Castle

== Marriage and children ==
Oldenburg married on 26 September 1987 at Pronstorf Countess Caroline zu Rantzau (b. 1962), daughter of Count Christian Karl zu Rantzau (1924–2002) and his wife Heloise von Lettow-Vorbeck (1923-2018). They have four children:

- Duke Alexander of Oldenburg (b. 17 March 1990, in Lübeck)
- Duke Philipp of Oldenburg (b. 28 December 1991, in Lübeck), married in a civil ceremony on 15 August 2025, and in a religious ceremony on 16 August 2025 to Countess Fiona Khuen-Lützow, daughter of Count Conradin Khuen von Belasi-Lützow and Martina von Veyder-Malberg, at St. Ulrich’s Church in Rastede near Oldenburg.
- Duke Anton of Oldenburg (b. 9 January 1993, in Lübeck)
- Duchess Katharina of Oldenburg (b. 20 February 1997, in Lübeck), married in a religious ceremony on 13 July 2024 to Count Clemens Moy de Sans, son of Count Guy Moys de Sans and Verena von Stein zu Lausnitz, at St. Ulrich’s Church in Rastede near Oldenburg.

== Ancestry ==
Ancestors of Christian Herzog von Oldenburg

16. Peter II, Grand Duke of Oldenburg
8. Frederick Augustus II, Grand Duke of Oldenburg
17. Princess Elisabeth of Saxe-Altenburg
4. Nikolaus, Hereditary Grand Duke of Oldenburg
18. Frederick Francis II, Grand Duke of Mecklenburg-Schwerin
9. Duchess Elisabeth Alexandrine of Mecklenburg-Schwerin
19. Princess Marie of Schwarzburg-Rudolstadt
2. Anton-Günther, Duke of Oldenburg
20. George Victor, Prince of Waldeck and Pyrmont
10. Friedrich, Prince of Waldeck and Pyrmont
21. Princess Helena of Nassau
5. Princess Helena of Waldeck and Pyrmont
22. Prince William of Schaumburg-Lippe
11. Princess Bathildis of Schaumburg-Lippe
23. Princess Bathildis of Anhalt-Dessau
1. Christian, Duke of Oldenburg
24. Wilhelm, 4th Prince of Löwenstein-Wertheim-Freudenberg
12. Prince Alfred of Löwenstein-Wertheim-Freudenberg
25. Countess Olga Clara of Schönburg-Forderglauchau
6. Udo, 6th Prince of Löwenstein-Wertheim-Freudenberg
26. Wilhelm, Count von Reichenbach-Lessonitz
13. Countess Pauline von Reichenbach-Lessonitz
27. Baroness Helene Amelie Goeler von Ravensburg
3. Princess Ameli of Löwenstein-Wertheim-Freudenberg
28. Friedrich Carl, Count of Castell-Castell
14. Friedrich Carl, Princely Count of Castell-Castell
29. Countess Emma of Solms-Rödelheim-Assenheim
7. Countess Margarete of Castell-Castell
30. Count Konstantin of Stolberg-Wernigerode
15. Countess Gertrud of Stolberg-Wernigerode
31. Countess Antonia of Stolberg-Wernigerode

Christian Herzog von Oldenburg House of Holstein-Gottorp Cadet branch of the House of Oldenburg Born: 1 February 1955
Titles in pretence
Preceded by Anton-Günther	— TITULAR — Grand Duke of Oldenburg; 20 September 2014 – present Reason for succession failure: Grand Duchy abolished in 1918	Incumbent; Heir: Duke Alexander of Oldenburg
