= Anton Günther Herzog von Oldenburg =

Anton Günther
- Duke of Oldenburg

Head of House of Oldenburg
- Tenure: 3 April 1970 – 20 September 2014
- Predecessor: Nikolaus, Hereditary Grand Duke of Oldenburg
- Successor: Christian, Duke of Oldenburg
- Born: 16 January 1923; Lensahn, Germany
- Died: 20 September 2014 (aged 91); Harmsdorf, Ostholstein, Schleswig-Holstein, Germany
- Spouse: Princess Ameli of Löwenstein-Wertheim-Freudenberg (m. 1951)
- Issue: Duchess Helene; Christian, Duke of Oldenburg
Names
- Anton Günther Friedrich August Josias von Oldenburg
- House: Holstein-Gottorp
- Father: Nikolaus, Hereditary Grand Duke of Oldenburg
- Mother: Princess Helena of Waldeck and Pyrmont
- Religion: Lutheranism

Anton-Günther Herzog von Oldenburg (16 January 1923 – 20 September 2014) was the head of the Grand Ducal Family of Oldenburg.

== Life ==
He was born in Lensahn the son of Hereditary Grand Duke Nikolaus of Oldenburg (1897–1970) and his first wife Princess Helena of Waldeck and Pyrmont (1899–1948). Duke Anton-Günther was a grandson of Frederick Augustus II, the last Grand Duke of Oldenburg, and through his mother a grandson of Friedrich, the last Prince of Waldeck and Pyrmont.

He studied for a Diploma in Forestry and succeeded as head of the Grand Ducal Family of Oldenburg upon the death of his father, the Hereditary Grand Duke, on 3 April 1970. He died in September 2014 aged 91.

The ancestral home of the House of Oldenburg is Oldenburg castle, nowadays a museum owned by the state. Private seats of the Duke of Oldenburg are Rastede Palace near Oldenburg and Güldenstein Manor, Harmsdorf, in Schleswig-Holstein. Eutin Castle in Schleswig-Holstein is a museum owned by a family foundation set up by Duke Anton-Günther.

According to his obituary issued by the family his ancestral titles (however not all part of his official German surname) were: HRH The Duke of Oldenburg, Heir in Norway, Duke of Schleswig, Holstein, Stormarn, Dithmarschen and Oldenburg, Prince of Lübeck and Birkenfeld, Lord of Jever and Knyphausen.

== Marriage and children ==
Duke Anton-Günther was married to Princess Ameli of Löwenstein-Wertheim-Freudenberg (1923-2016) at Kreuzwertheim on 7 August 1951. They have two children:

- Duchess Helene Elisabeth Bathildis Margarete of Oldenburg (born 3 August 1953 in Rastede), unmarried
- Duke Christian Nikolaus Udo Peter of Oldenburg (born 1 February 1955 in Rastede), married to Countess Caroline zu Rantzau and has four children.

The Duke and the Duchess lived at Güldenstein Manor, Harmsdorf, Schleswig Holstein. The Duke also owned Eutin Castle and Rastede Castle.

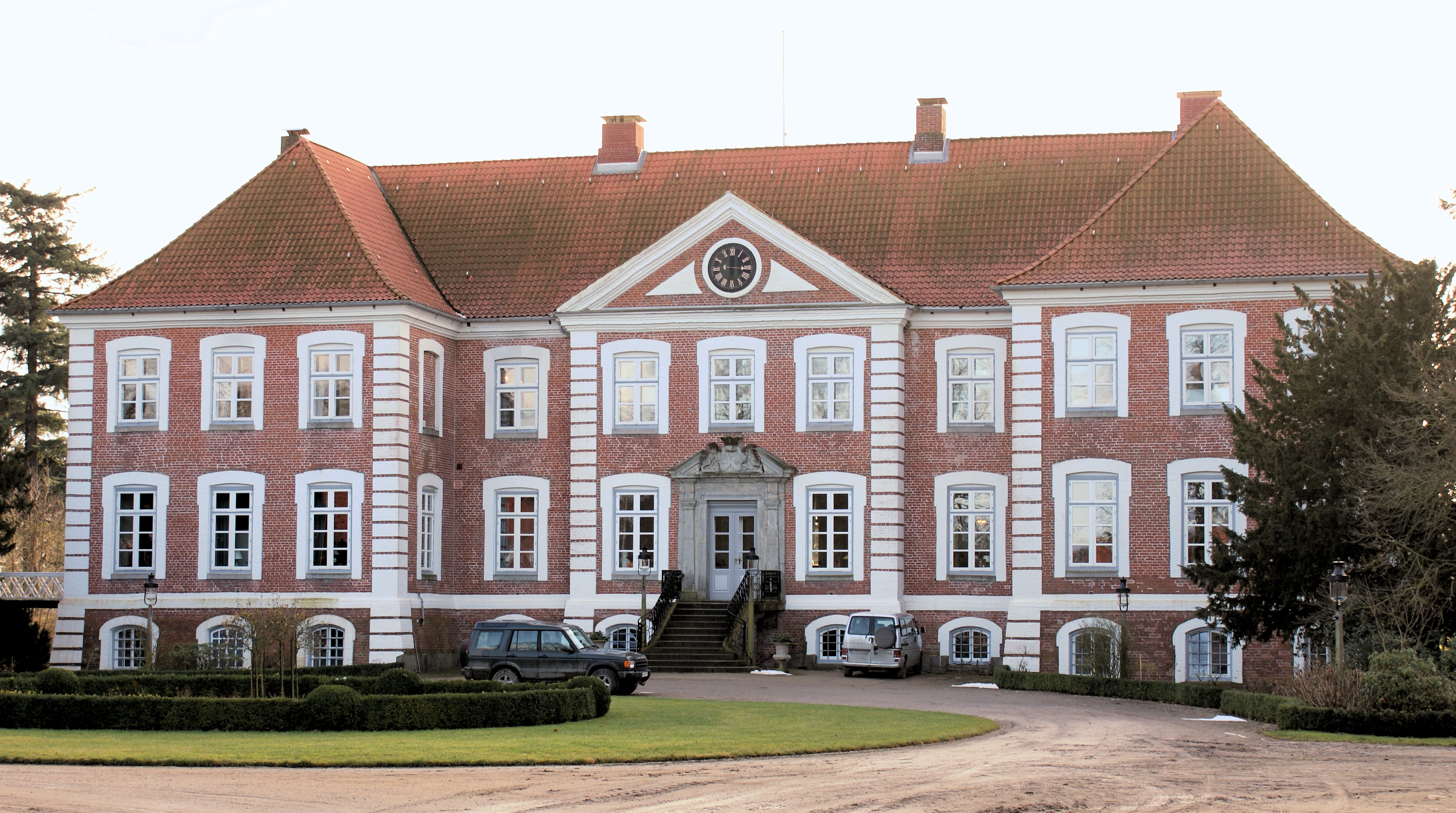
Güldenstein Manor, Harmsdorf

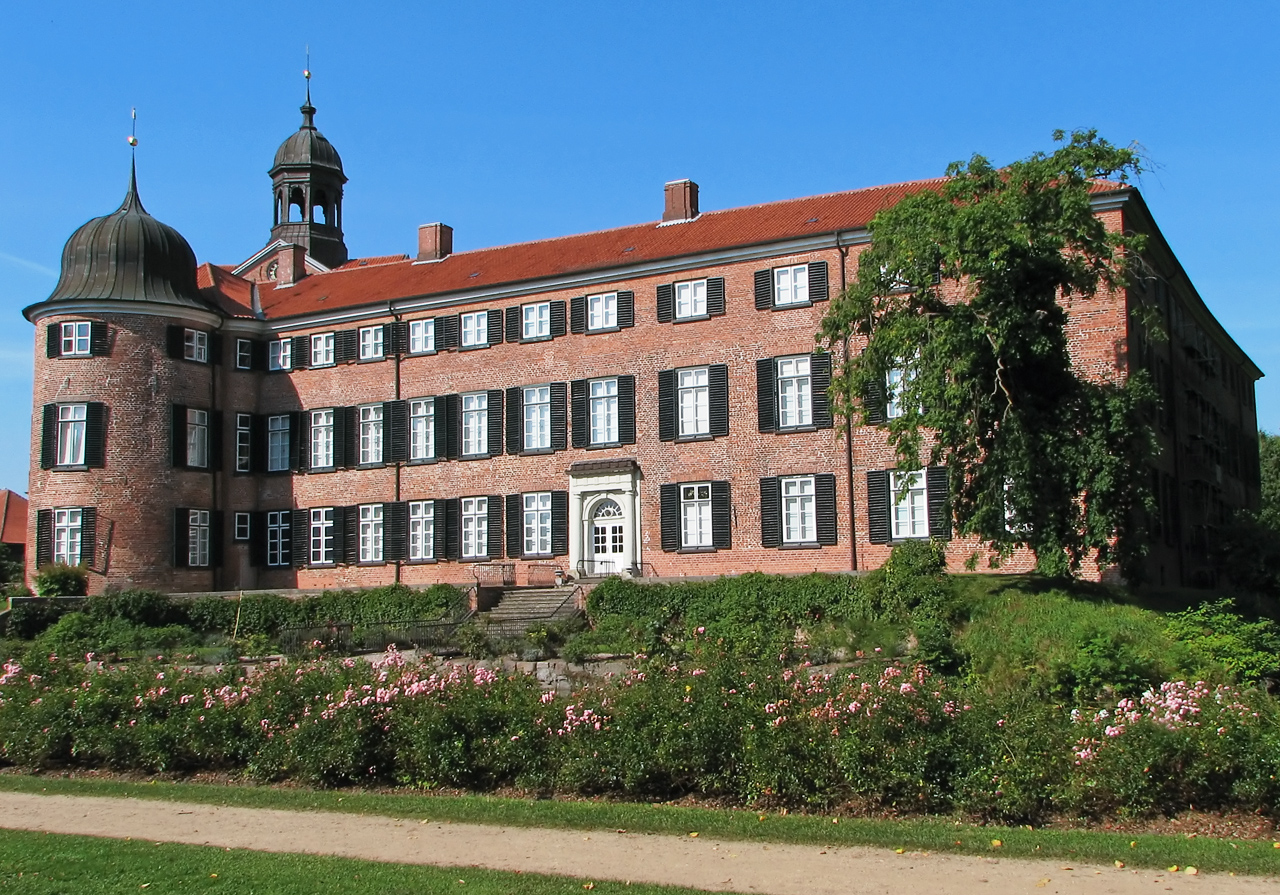
Eutin Castle

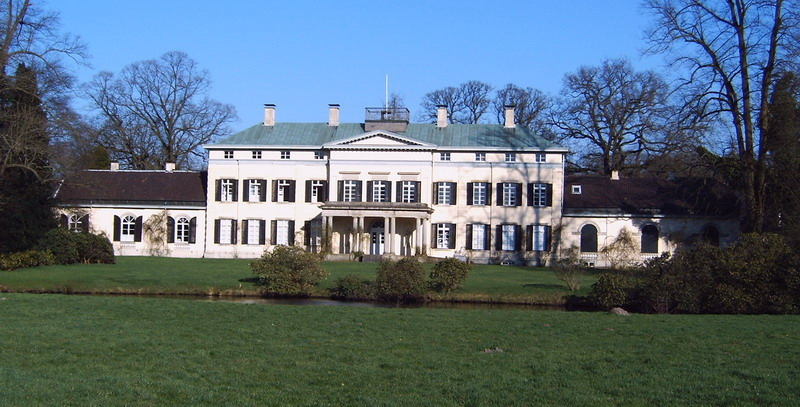
Rastede Castle

== Ancestry ==
Ancestors of Anton Günther Herzog von Oldenburg

8. Peter II, Grand Duke of Oldenburg
4. Frederick Augustus II, Grand Duke of Oldenburg
9. Princess Elisabeth of Saxe-Altenburg
2. Nikolaus, Hereditary Grand Duke of Oldenburg
10. Frederick Francis II, Grand Duke of Mecklenburg-Schwerin
5. Duchess Elisabeth Alexandrine of Mecklenburg-Schwerin
11. Princess Marie of Schwarzburg-Rudolstadt
1. Anton-Günther, Duke of Oldenburg
12. George Victor, Prince of Waldeck and Pyrmont
6. Friedrich, Prince of Waldeck and Pyrmont
13. Princess Helena of Nassau
3. Princess Helena of Waldeck and Pyrmont
14. Prince William of Schaumburg-Lippe
7. Princess Bathildis of Schaumburg-Lippe
15. Princess Bathildis of Anhalt-Dessau

== See also ==
- Counts, dukes and grand dukes of Oldenburg

Anton Günther Herzog von Oldenburg House of Holstein-Gottorp Cadet branch of the House of Oldenburg Born: 16 January 1923 Died: 20 September 2014
Titles in pretence
| Preceded by Nikolaus | — TITULAR — Grand Duke of Oldenburg; 3 April 1970 – 20 September 2014; Reason for succession failure: Grand Duchy abolished in 1918 | Succeeded by Christian |
