= Nikolaus, Hereditary Grand Duke of Oldenburg =

Nikolaus
- Hereditary Grand Duke of Oldenburg
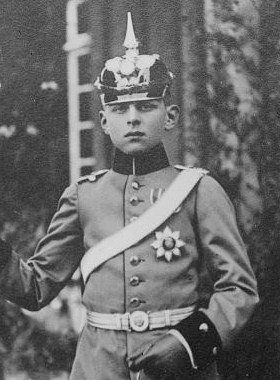
- Photo of Nikolaus Friedrich, Hereditary Grand Duke of Oldenburg in his military uniform (circa 1910)

Head of House of Oldenburg
- Tenure: 24 February 1931 – 3 April 1970
- Predecessor: Frederick Augustus II, Grand Duke of Oldenburg
- Successor: Anton-Günther, Duke of Oldenburg
- Born: 10 August 1897; Oldenburg, Grand Duchy of Oldenburg
- Died: 3 April 1970 (aged 72); Rastede, West Germany
- Spouse: Princess Helena of Waldeck and Pyrmont (m. 1921; died 1948) Anne-Marie von Schutzbar gennant Milchling (m. 1950)
- Issue Detail: Anton-Günther, Duke of Oldenburg; Duchess Rixa; Duke Peter; Eilika, Princess of Leiningen; Duke Eigilmar; Duke Friedrich August; Altburg, Baroness Rüdiger von Erffa; Duke Huno; Duke Johann
Names
- German: Nikolaus Friedrich Wilhelm
- House: Holstein-Gottorp
- Father: Frederick Augustus II, Grand Duke of Oldenburg
- Mother: Duchess Elisabeth Alexandrine of Mecklenburg-Schwerin
- Religion: Lutheranism

Nikolaus, Hereditary Grand Duke of Oldenburg (German: Nikolaus Friedrich Wilhelm von Holstein-Gottorp, Erbgroßherzog von Oldenburg; 10 August 1897 – 3 April 1970) was the eldest son of Frederick Augustus II, Grand Duke of Oldenburg, who was the last ruling Grand Duke of Oldenburg. In 1931, Nikolaus succeeded to his father's titles and assumed the role of pretender to the Grand Duchy, until his death in 1970.

== Early life ==
Nikolaus was born at Oldenburg, Grand Duchy of Oldenburg, the third child and first son of Frederick Augustus II, Grand Duke of Oldenburg (1852–1931) (son of Peter II, Grand Duke of Oldenburg and Princess Elisabeth of Saxe-Altenburg) and his wife, Duchess Elisabeth Alexandrine of Mecklenburg-Schwerin (1869–1955) (daughter of Frederick Francis II, Grand Duke of Mecklenburg-Schwerin and Princess Marie of Schwarzburg-Rudolstadt). He was a first cousin of Queen Juliana of the Netherlands and with his wife and other family members was a guest at her 1937 wedding to Prince Bernhard of Lippe-Biesterfeld.

== Marriage and issue ==
Nikolaus married on 26 October 1921 in Arolsen to Princess Helena of Waldeck and Pyrmont (1899–1948), only daughter of Friedrich, Prince of Waldeck and Pyrmont, and Princess Bathildis of Schaumburg-Lippe. They had nine children:

- Anton-Günther, Duke of Oldenburg (16 January 1923 – 20 September 2014), married Princess Ameli of Löwenstein-Wertheim-Freudenberg on 7 August 1951, and had issue.
- Duchess Rixa (28 March 1924 – 1 April 1939), who died after she fell off her horse.
- Duke Peter (7 August 1926 – 18 November 2016), married Princess Gertrud of Löwenstein-Wertheim-Freudenberg (24 January 1926 – 4 February 2011; sister of Princess Ameli of Löwenstein-Wertheim-Freudenberg) on 7 August 1951, and had issue.
- Duchess Eilika (2 February 1928 – 26 January 2016), a bridesmaid at the 1937 wedding of Juliana of the Netherlands, married Emich, 7th Prince of Leiningen on 10 August 1950, and had issue, including Prince Karl Emich of Leiningen and Andreas, Prince of Leiningen
- Duke Egilmar (14 October 1934 – 10 May 2013)
- Duke Friedrich August of Oldenburg (11 January 1936 – 9 July 2017), married Princess Marie-Cécile of Prussia on 4 December 1965, divorced 1989, and had issue. He remarried Countess Donata of Castell-Rüdenhausen on 9 February 1991.
- Duchess Altburg (14 October 1938 - 30 October 2025), married Baron Rüdiger von Erffa (born on 19 April 1936) on 8 July 1967 and had issue.
- Duke Huno Friedrich Peter Max of Oldenburg (3 January 1940), married Countess Felicitas-Anita Schwerin von Krosigk (born 5 July 1941) on 6 June 1970 and had issue, including Beatrix von Storch.
- Duke Johann Friedrich of Oldenburg (3 January 1940 – 5 April 2025), married Countess Ilka of Ortenburg (born 29 June 1942) on 9 October 1971 and had issue, including Archduchess Eilika of Austria.

When his first wife died in 1948, he married secondly on 20 September 1950 in Güldenstein to a fellow noblewoman, Anne-Marie von Schutzbar genannt Milchling (1903–1991), former wife of Count Bechtold von Bernstorff, daughter of Rudolf von Schutzbar gen. Milchling (1853-1935) and Rose Marston (1872-1957). They had no children.

== Notes and sources ==
- Genealogisches Handbuch des Adels, Fürstliche Häuser, Reference: 1971

Nikolaus, Hereditary Grand Duke of Oldenburg House of Holstein-Gottorp Cadet branch of the House of Oldenburg Born: 10 August 1897 Died: 3 April 1970
Titles in pretence
Preceded by Frederick Augustus II	— TITULAR — Grand Duke of Oldenburg; 1931–1970; Reason for succession failure: Grand Duchy abolished in 1918	Succeeded by Anton-Günther
