= Beatrix von Storch =

German politician (born 1971)

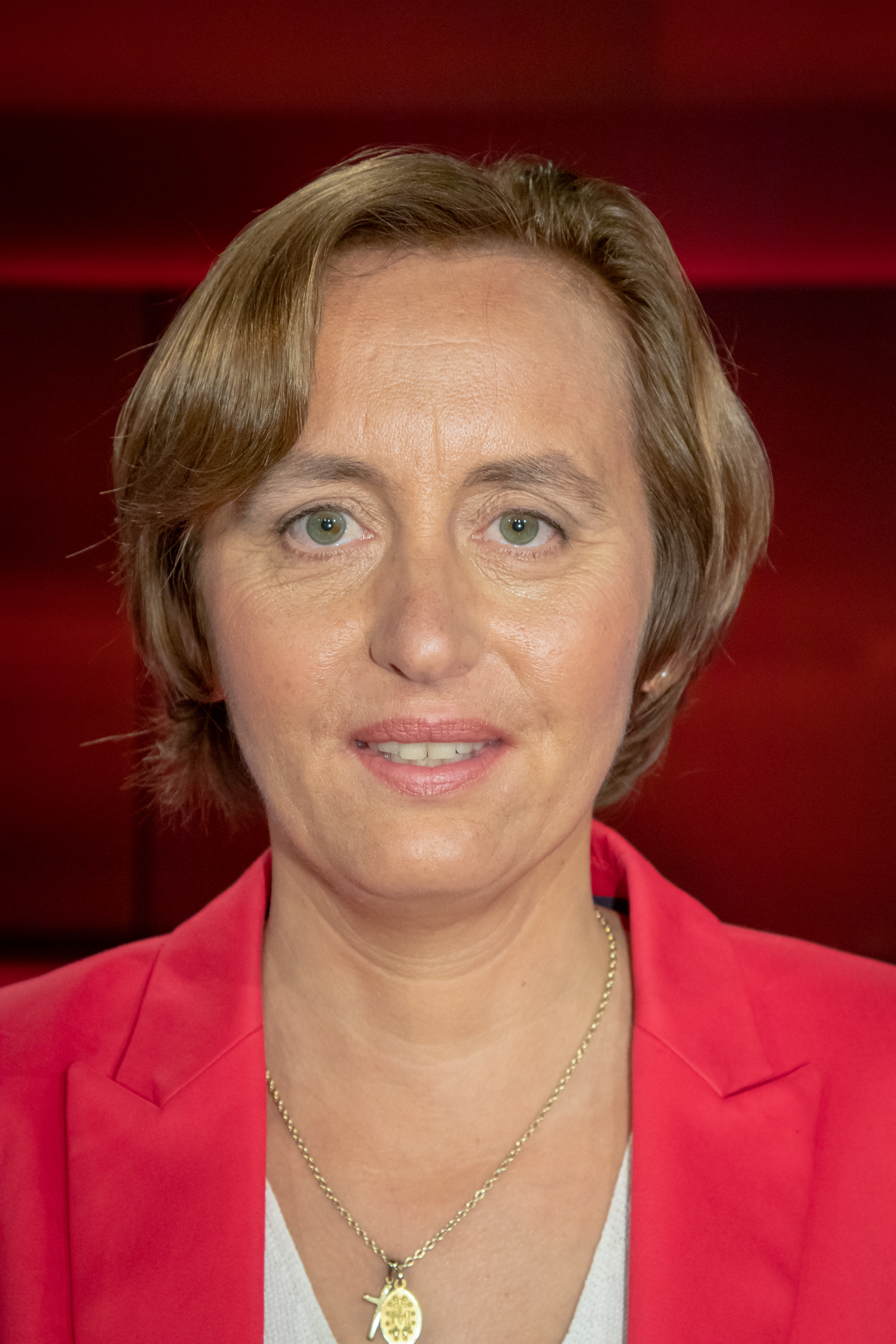
- Von Storch in 2019

Deputy Parliamentary Group Leader of the Alternative for Germany
- Incumbent
- Assumed office 5 July 2015 Serving with Sebastian Münzenmaier; Jörn König; Stefan Keuter
- Leader: Alice Weidel and Tino Chrupalla

Member of the Bundestag
- Incumbent
- Assumed office 24 September 2017

Member of the European Parliament
- In office 1 July 2014 – 27 October 2017
- Constituency: Germany

Personal details
- Born: Beatrix Amelie Ehrengard Eilika Herzogin von Oldenburg; 27 May 1971 (age 55) Lübeck, West Germany
- Party: Alternative for Germany (2013–present)
- Other political affiliations: Free Democratic Party (2011–2013)
- Spouse: Sven von Storch (m. 2004)
- Relations: Lutz Graf Schwerin von Krosigk (maternal grandfather); Nikolaus, Hereditary Grand Duke of Oldenburg (paternal grandfather)

Beatrix Amelie Ehrengard Eilika von Storch (née Herzogin von Oldenburg; 27 May 1971) is a German politician and lawyer, who has been the Deputy Parliamentary Leader of the Alternative for Germany since July 2015 and a Member of the Bundestag since September 2017. She previously was a Member of the European Parliament (MEP) from Germany. From April 2016 to 2017 she was also a member of the right-wing populist Anti-EU group Europe of Freedom and Direct Democracy. She is part of the right-wing conservative wing of the parliamentary group of the AfD. She belongs ancestrally to the royal House of Oldenburg which reigned over the Grand Duchy of Oldenburg until 1918.

== Family background ==
In accordance with the traditions of the House of Oldenburg, her dynastic style from birth was Her Highness Duchess Beatrix Amelie Ehrengard Eilika of Oldenburg. She is the elder daughter of Duke Huno of Oldenburg (b. 1940) and his wife, Countess Felicitas-Anita "Fenita" Schwerin von Krosigk (b. 1941). Her father is a younger son of Nikolaus, Hereditary Grand Duke of Oldenburg (1897–1970), erstwhile head of the former ruling family of Oldenburg that lost its throne in 1918. She belongs to the same male-line as the royal houses of Denmark and Norway, the deposed royal house of Greece and imperial Russia, and Charles III, king of the United Kingdom and 14 other Commonwealth realms, to which last crown she is also distantly in line in accordance with the Act of Settlement 1701.

Her maternal grandfather was Lutz Graf Schwerin von Krosigk, who served as finance minister from 1932 in the Weimar Republic and continued serving as finance minister in Nazi Germany until its fall in 1945. Schwerin von Krosigk was one of only three members of the Hitler cabinet to serve continuously from its formation until its dissolution. After the death of Adolf Hitler and Joseph Goebbels, he additionally served as the Leading Minister and foreign minister of the short-lived Flensburg Government of Karl Dönitz – and so as the de facto last head of government of Nazi Germany was tasked with announcing on 7 May 1945, via radio Reichssender Flensburg the unconditional surrender of the German Wehrmacht, thus ending the war in Europe. He was convicted for crimes committed as part of the Nazi regime at the Ministries Trial in 1949, with his prison sentence commuted in 1951.

Her cousin, Eilika of Oldenburg, is married to Georg von Habsburg, a son of Otto, the last Crown Prince of Austria-Hungary.

== Personal life ==
On 22 October 2010 she married German-Chilean businessman Sven von Storch (born 1970), member of a German noble family from Mecklenburg. He is the son of businessman Berndt Detlev von Storch (1930–2004) and Antje Liete Krüger-Franke (b. 1938).

== Education and early career ==
Von Storch was a banker before she studied law in Heidelberg and Lausanne. She worked as a lawyer in Berlin when she began her political career. She has also been a member of the Friedrich A. von Hayek Society.

== Political career ==
Together with her husband, she founded several far-right political associations. On several occasions, the tax authorities have investigated the couple, accused in particular of having misappropriated donations intended for their associations.

Von Storch was a co-founder of the Göttinger Kreis – Students for the Rule of Law Association – an organization which sought to campaign for reparation for the expulsions and nationalization of land in the Soviet occupied zones of Germany and the former East Germany. The organization calls for appropriated land to be returned to its original owners. The association organized various events with Mikhail Gorbachev, among others.

Von Storch was a member of the Free Democratic Party and in 2013, became a founding member of Election Alternative 13 set up by Bernd Lucke as the precursor to Alternative for Germany.

In 2014, Beatrix von Storch was elected a Member of European Parliament representing Alternative for Germany. Initially a member of the European Conservatives and Reformists group, she left the group in April 2016, forestalling her imminent expulsion, and immediately joined the Europe of Freedom and Direct Democracy (EFDD) group. In the 2017 German federal election, she was elected to the Bundestag and presently serves as deputy chairwoman of the AfD's parliamentary faction. Following her election to the Bundenstag, she resigned her seat in the European parliament and was replaced by Jörg Meuthen.

Von Storch has been described as a social conservative. She has expressed opposition to same-sex marriage and abortion. She has accused school gay youth networks of using "forced sexualization" on their students. Von Storch also supported the United Kingdom's vote for Brexit and is a friend of British eurosceptic politician Nigel Farage. In parliament, she regularly shows her support for Israel which she regards as an ally in the fight against Islamism and in 2017 created the pro-Israel "Friends of Judea-Samaria" group in the European Parliament. Asked in 2016 about the ideological proximity between the AfD and the Front national, she believes that on economic issues, Marine Le Pen is too far to the left, stating that she does not agree with Le Pen's ideas on protectionism and state interventionism. She has been characterized as a member and supporter of the more moderate Alternative Mitte faction of the AfD.

== Controversies ==
=== Legal battle with the Berliner Schaubühne ===
In November 2015, a leading Berlin theatre, the Schaubühne, was brought into legal conflict with Beatrix von Storch over a play, Falk Richter's FEAR, that parodied AfD leaders as zombies and mass murderers. Beatrix von Storch is depicted facing retribution for her grandfather's role as a minister in Hitler's government. AfD Spokesperson Christian Lüth responded by interrupting a performance and filming it. Beatrix von Storch and the conservative activist Hedwig von Beverfoerde then requested and obtained a preliminary injunction against the theatre, prohibiting it from using images of them in the production. They charged that the use of the images violated their human dignity protected under the Constitution. On 15 December 2015, the court ruled against the complainants in favour of the theatre's freedom of expression and lifted the injunctions against using the images. The judges commented that 'any audience member can recognize that this is just a play'.

=== Remarks about use of deadly force against refugees ===
In late February 2016, von Storch was "pied" by members of the German left-wing group Peng Collective at a party meeting in Kassel. The activists, dressed as clowns, protested against her assertion that German border control personnel had the right to shoot at incoming illegal immigrants. A YouTube video of the assault gained wide attention in social media.

=== "Rapist hordes" tweet ===
Von Storch's Twitter account was blocked for twelve hours after she posted a criticism of the Cologne Police Department for publishing a New Years greeting in Arabic as well as in German, French and English. She had written: "What the hell is wrong with this country? Why is the official page of the police in NRW tweeting in Arabic? Are they seeking to appease the barbaric, Muslim, rapist hordes of men?" Cologne was the location of multiple sexual assaults and robbery on New Year's Eve, December 2015 (see New Year's Eve sexual assaults in Germany). Other prominent members of the AfD quickly sprang to von Storch's defense, including Alice Weidel.

== Ancestry ==
Ancestors of Beatrix von Storch

16. Peter II, Grand Duke of Oldenburg
8. Frederick Augustus II, Grand Duke of Oldenburg
17. Princess Elisabeth of Saxe-Altenburg
4. Nikolaus, Hereditary Grand Duke of Oldenburg
18. Frederick Francis II, Grand Duke of Mecklenburg-Schwerin
9. Duchess Elisabeth Alexandrine of Mecklenburg-Schwerin
19. Princess Marie of Schwarzburg-Rudolstadt
2. Huno, Duke of Oldenburg
20. George Victor, Prince of Waldeck and Pyrmont
10. Friedrich, Prince of Waldeck and Pyrmont
21. Princess Helena of Nassau
5. Princess Helena of Waldeck and Pyrmont
22. Prince William of Schaumburg-Lippe
11. Princess Bathildis of Schaumburg-Lippe
23. Princess Bathildis of Anhalt-Dessau
1. Beatrix von Storch
24. Adolf von Krosigk
12. Erich von Krosigk
25. Lisette von Westphalen
6. Lutz Graf Schwerin von Krosigk
26. Count Wilhelm von Schwerin
13. Countess Luise von Schwerin
27. Luise Sartorius von Schwanenfeld
3. Countess Felicitas-Anita von Schwerin-Krosigk
28. Baron Adolph von Bodelschwingh-Plettenberg
14. Count Friedrich von Plettenberg-Heeren
29. Baroness Bertha von Plettenberg-Heeren
7. Baroness Ehrengard "Minette" von Plettenberg
30. Erich von Krosigk
15. Ehrengard von Krosigk
31. Sidonie von Veltheim

== See also ==
- 2014 European Parliament election in Germany
- Counts, dukes and grand dukes of Oldenburg
- List of people who have been pied
