= Großherzogin Elisabeth =

Großherzogin Elisabeth may refer to:

== Sailing ships ==
- Duchesse Anne (former German ship Großherzogin Elisabeth, built in 1901)
- Großherzogin Elisabeth (ship) (German sail training ship, built in 1909 as San Antonio)

== People ==
- Princess Elisabeth of Saxe-Altenburg (1826–1896) (Grand Duchess of Oldenburg)
- Duchess Elisabeth Alexandrine of Mecklenburg-Schwerin (1869–1955, Grand Duchess of Oldenburg)
