= Ameli, Duchess of Oldenburg =

Princess Ameli
- Duchess of Oldenburg
- Born: 4 March 1923; Frankfurt am Main, Weimar Republic
- Died: 26 March 2016 (aged 93); Eutin, Germany
- Spouse: Anton Günther Herzog von Oldenburg (m. 1951; died 2014)
- Issue: Helene; Christian, Duke of Oldenburg
Names
- German: Ameli Gertrud Pauline Antonie Madeleine Wanda Elisabeth
- House: Löwenstein-Wertheim-Freudenberg
- Father: Udo, Prince of Löwenstein-Wertheim-Freudenberg
- Mother: Countess Margarete of Castell-Castell

Ameli Gertrud Pauline Antonie Madeleine Wanda Elisabeth Prinzessin zu Löwenstein-Wertheim-Freudenberg (4 March 1923 – 26 March 2016) was the daughter of Udo, Prince of Löwenstein-Wertheim-Freudenberg, and widow of Anton-Günther, Duke of Oldenburg, the late pretender to the Grand Duchy of Oldenburg.

== Early life ==
Ameli was born at Frankfurt am Main, Weimar Republic, the first child of Udo, Prince of Löwenstein-Wertheim-Freudenberg (1896–1980), and his wife, Countess Margarete of Castell-Castell (1899–1969), daughter of Friedrich Carl, Prince of Castell-Castell, and his wife, Countess Gertrud of Stolberg-Wernigerode.

== Marriage and family ==
Oldenburg married on 7 August 1951 in Kreuzwertheim, to Anton Günther Herzog von Oldenburg (1923–2014), son of Nikolaus, Hereditary Grand Duke of Oldenburg (1897–1970) and his first wife Princess Helena of Waldeck and Pyrmont (1899–1948). Duke Anton Günther is a grandson of the last Grand Duke of Oldenburg, Frederick Augustus II.

They had two children.

- Duchess Helene Elisabeth Bathildis Margarete of Oldenburg (born 3 August 1953 in Rastede), unmarried
- Duke Christian Nikolaus Udo Peter of Oldenburg (born 1 February 1955 in Rastede), married to Countess Caroline zu Rantzau and has issue. Since the death of Duke Anton-Günther, Duke Christian is now the Duke of Oldenburg and head of the Grand Ducal Family of Oldenburg.

== Ancestry ==
Ancestors of Ameli, Duchess of Oldenburg

8. Wilhelm, Prince of Löwenstein-Wertheim-Freudenberg
4. Prince Alfred of Löwenstein-Wertheim-Freudenberg
9. Countess Olga Clara of Schönburg-Forderglauchau
2. Udo, Prince of Löwenstein-Wertheim-Freudenberg
10. Count Wilhelm of Reichenbach-Lessonitz
5. Countess Pauline of Reichenbach-Lessonitz
11. Baroness Amélie Göler of Ravensburg
1. Princess Ameli of Löwenstein-Wertheim-Freudenberg
12. Carl, Count of Castell-Castell
6. Friedrich Carl, Prince of Castell-Castell
13. Countess Emma of Solms-Rödelheim-Assenheim
3. Countess Margarete of Castell-Castell
14. Count Constantin of Stolberg-Wernigerode
7. Countess Gertrud of Stolberg-Wernigerode
15. Countess Antonie of Stolberg-Wernigerode

== Sources ==
- Huberty, Michel; Giraud, Alain; Magdelaine, F. et B. (1976). L'Allemagne dynastique. Tome I, Hesse, Reuss, Saxe [Dynastic Germany. Volume I, Hesse, Reuss, Saxony.] (in French). Vol. I. Reference: IV 475. Le Perreux: A. Giraud.
- The Royal House of Stuart, London, 1969, 1971, 1976, Addington, A. C., Reference: II 381
- Addington, Arthur Charles (1969). The Royal House of Stuart: The Descendants of King James VI of Scotland, James I of England, Volume 1. Vol. 1. Skilton.
- Addington, Arthur Charles (1971). The Royal House of Stuart: The Descendants of King James VI of Scotland, James I of England, Volume 2. Vol. 2. Skilton. ISBN 978-0284391704.
- Addington, Arthur Charles (1976). The Royal House of Stuart: The Descendants of King James VI of Scotland, James I of England, Volume 3. Vol. 3. Skilton. ISBN 978-0284400062.
- Genealogisches Handbuch des Adels, Fürstliche Häuser, Reference: 1964 265
- Ehrenkrook, Hans Fr. v. (1 January 1961). Genealogisches Handbuch der Adeligen Häuser [Genealogical Handbook of Noble Houses]. Fürstliche Häuser (in German). Vol. 6 (EA ed.). Limburg: Starke. ASIN B07VW32BWV.
- "Ameli Herzogin von Oldenburg verstorben" [Ameli, Duchess of Oldenburg passed away]. ln-online.de (in German).

Ameli, Duchess of Oldenburg House of Löwenstein-Wertheim-Freudenberg Born: 4 March 1923
Titles in pretence
Preceded by Anne-Marie von Schutzbar genannt Milchling	— TITULAR — Grand Duchess of Oldenburg; 3 April 1970 – 20 September 2014; Reason for succession failure: Grand Duchy abolished in 1918	Succeeded by Countess Caroline zu Rantzau
