= Princess Helena of Waldeck and Pyrmont (1899–1948) =

Princess Helena
- Hereditary Grand Duchess of Oldenburg
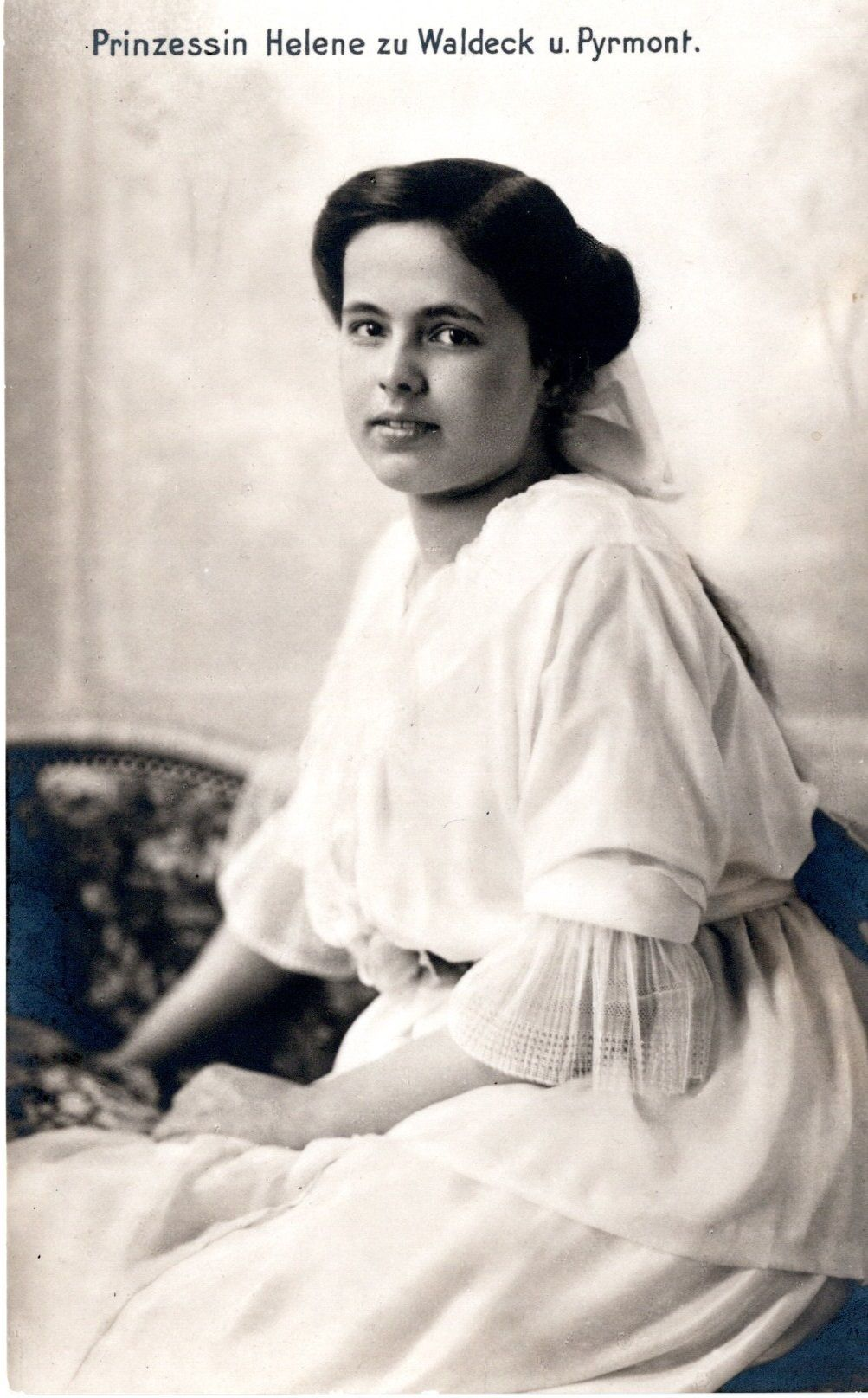
- Princess Helena c. 1910
- Born: 22 December 1899; Arolsen, Waldeck and Pyrmont
- Died: 18 February 1948 (aged 48); Rastede, Allied-occupied Germany
- Spouse: Nikolaus, Hereditary Grand Duke of Oldenburg (m. 1921)
- Issue Detail: Anton-Günther, Duke of Oldenburg; Duchess Rixa; Duke Peter; Eilika, Princess of Leiningen; Duke Eigilmar; Duke Friedrich August; Altburg, Baroness Rüdiger of Erffa; Duke Huno; Duke Johann
Names
- German: Helene Bathildis Charlotte Maria Friederike
- House: Waldeck and Pyrmont
- Father: Friedrich, Prince of Waldeck and Pyrmont
- Mother: Princess Bathildis of Schaumburg-Lippe

Princess Helena of Waldeck and Pyrmont (German: Helene Bathildis Charlotte Maria Friederike Prinzessin zu Waldeck und Pyrmont; 22 December 1899 – 18 February 1948) was the only daughter of Friedrich, Prince of Waldeck and Pyrmont, last reigning Prince of Waldeck and Pyrmont, and wife of Nikolaus, Hereditary Grand Duke of Oldenburg.

== Early life ==
Helena was born at Arolsen, Waldeck and Pyrmont the third child and only daughter of Friedrich, Prince of Waldeck and Pyrmont (1865–1946), and his wife, Princess Bathildis of Schaumburg-Lippe (1873–1962), daughter of Wilhelm Karl August, Prince of Schaumburg-Lippe.

She was a first cousin of Queen Wilhelmina of the Netherlands. She was named after her paternal aunt Princess Helena, Duchess of Albany (1861–1922) who married Prince Leopold, Duke of Albany, youngest son of Queen Victoria.

== Marriage and family ==
Helena married on 26 October 1921 in Arolsen, Nikolaus, Hereditary Grand Duke of Oldenburg (1897–1970), third child and first son of Frederick Augustus II, Grand Duke of Oldenburg and Duchess Elisabeth Alexandrine of Mecklenburg-Schwerin.

They had nine children:

- Anton-Günther, Duke of Oldenburg (16 January 1923 – 20 September 2014); married Princess Ameli of Löwenstein-Wertheim-Freudenberg, had issue
- Duchess Rixa of Oldenburg (28 March 1924 – 1 April 1939); died unmarried and without issue
- Duke Peter of Oldenburg (7 August 1926 – 18 November 2016); married Princess Gertrude of Löwenstein-Wertheim-Freudenberg, had issue
- Duchess Eilika of Oldenburg (2 February 1928 – 26 January 2016); married Emich, 7th Prince of Leiningen, had issue, including Prince Karl Emich of Leiningen and Andreas, Prince of Leiningen
- Duke Egilmar of Oldenburg (14 October 1934 – 10 May 2013)
- Duke Friedrich August of Oldenburg (11 January 1936 – 9 July 2017); married first Princess Marie-Cécile of Prussia, had issue, second Donata Countess of Castell-Rüdenhausen, no issue
- Duchess Altburg of Oldenburg (b. 14 October 1938 - 30 October 2025); married Baron Rüdiger of Erffa, had issue
- Duke Huno of Oldenburg (b. 3 January 1940); married Countess Felicitas-Anita of Schwerin von Krosigk, had two daughters including Beatrix von Storch
- Duke Johann of Oldenburg (b. 3 January 1940 - 5 April 2025); married Ilka Gräfin zu Ortenburg, had issue. His daughter Eilika married Archduke Georg of Austria

She died at the age of 48, her husband married again, two years after her death in 1950 to Anne-Marie von Schutzbar genannt Milchling.

== Social and humanitarian roles ==
Following her 1921 marriage, Helene assumed the titular role of Hereditary Grand Duchess of Oldenburg, actively presiding over the regional ceremonial and philanthropic networks of the non-reigning House of Oldenburg. During the interwar era and World War II, she served as the prominent head and patroness of the local Red Cross organizations within the Oldenburg region, financially sponsoring and organizing regional medical facilities, nursing schools, and welfare relief infrastructure for displaced populations.

During the height of the Allied bombing raids in northern Germany, Helene personally coordinated the evacuation and secure concealment of the Oldenburg grand ducal historical archives and fine art collections, preventing the destruction of the household's cultural heritage. Following the collapse of the German regime in 1945, she acted as a foundational matriarch for her extensive issue, managing the family's domestic stabilization and cooperating with local Lutheran parochial networks to facilitate regional community reconstruction until her death in 1948.

== Ancestry ==
Ancestors of Princess Helena of Waldeck and Pyrmont (1899–1948)

8. George II, Prince of Waldeck and Pyrmont
4. George Victor, Prince of Waldeck and Pyrmont
9. Princess Emma of Anhalt-Bernburg-Schaumburg-Hoym
2. Friedrich, Prince of Waldeck and Pyrmont
10. William, Duke of Nassau
5. Princess Helena of Nassau
11. Princess Pauline of Württemberg
1. Princess Helena of Waldeck and Pyrmont
12. George William, Prince of Schaumburg-Lippe
6. Prince William of Schaumburg-Lippe
13. Princess Ida of Waldeck and Pyrmont
3. Princess Bathildis of Schaumburg-Lippe
14. Prince Frederick Augustus of Anhalt-Dessau
7. Princess Bathildis of Anhalt-Dessau
15. Princess Marie Luise Charlotte of Hesse-Kassel

== Notes and sources ==
- The Royal House of Stuart, London, 1969, 1971, 1976, Addington, A. C., Reference: II 277, 349

Princess Helena of Waldeck and Pyrmont (1899–1948) House of Waldeck and Pyrmont Cadet branch of the House of Waldeck Born: 22 December 1899 Died: 18 February 1948
Titles in pretence
Preceded by Duchess Elisabeth Alexandrine of Mecklenburg-Schwerin	— TITULAR — Grand Duchess of Oldenburg; 24 February 1931 – 18 February 1948; Reason for succession failure: Grand Duchy abolished in 1918	Vacant Title next held by Anne-Marie von Schutzbar gennant Milchling
