= Broetje-Automation GmbH =

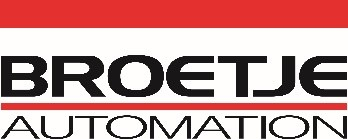
- Type: GmbH
- Industry: Aerospace industry
- Founded: 1979; 47 years ago (from August Brötje)
- Headquarters: Rastede, Germany
- Revenue: 120 million euros (2022)
- Number of employees: 450 (2022)
- Website: www.broetje-automation.de

Broetje-Automation GmbH is a special machine construction company in the aerospace sector with headquarters in Rastede (Lower Saxony). The company manufactures automatic machines and systems for the assembly of aircraft and their individual parts and acts as an integrator for the planning and realization of assembly lines in the aviation industry. Broetje-Automation (BA) emerged from the Rastede-based mechanical engineering and heating technology company August Brötje in 1979. It has been part of the Chinese Shanghai Electric Group since 2016. The company is active in 23 international locations (including all the major aerospace markets like Germany, US, France, UK, China, Russia, Japan). There are production facilities in Chicago, Shanghai, Toulouse and Rastede. Customers include Airbus, Boeing, Bombardier, Embraer, Premium AEROTEC, Mitsubishi and many other companies.

== Company ==
Broetje-Automation GmbH deals with assembly processes in the aerospace industry. The company has around 700 employees worldwide and has been developing and building machines and systems for the assembly of aircraft since 1979. It supplies aircraft manufacturers worldwide.

== History ==
Broetje-Automation emerged from the mechanical engineering and heating technology company August Brötje, which was founded in 1919. The subsidiary Brötje-Sümak-Automation built machine tools in the 1970s and was renamed Brötje-Automation GmbH in 1979.

With the delivery of the first machines for the automated riveting of aircraft components, the company established itself in the aviation industry between 1980 and 2000 and expanded into the US, Europe and Asia. In 2003, the Claas Group acquired the company and Broetje-Automation GmbH expanded its product repertoire to include joining stations and final assembly lines in addition to riveting machines. In 2006, the subsidiary Broetje Automation-USA, Inc. was founded.

In 2012, the company bought back the company shares from CLAAS KGaA mbH together with Deutsche Beteiligung AG. It also changed the existing spelling Brötje-Automation to Broetje-Automation for the international market.

In 2015, the Wiefelstede and Jaderberg sites were merged into the new company headquarters in Rastede and the subsidiary BA Japan K.K. was founded. In 2016, the Chinese Shanghai Electric Group (SEC) took over the company.

== Products ==
Broetje-Automation supplies automatic, turnkey systems for the assembly of aircraft. The company also offers individual planning, design and integration of all production and assembly steps through to commissioning. Broetje-Automation acts as an integrator of all necessary individual systems and manufactures machines for the various assembly processes in aircraft construction, such as riveting and joining techniques or production steps such as automated fiber placement and preforming. The machines and systems handle metallic materials as well as lightweight materials such as Cfrp, GFRP or other material composites. In addition, the company offers equipment and tools to support the assembly and maintenance of aircraft and industrial services such as machine maintenance, upgrades and modifications.

== Business segments ==
=== Machines and equipment ===
- Assembly Stations
- Fastening Machines
- Composites Systems
- Jigs & Tools

=== Factory equipment and integration ===
- Assembly Line Integration
- Consulting & Engineering
- Software Solutions

=== Smart Operations ===
- Operational Tooling
- Process Technologies
- Service
