= List of Oldenburgish consorts =

Coat of arms of the Grand Duchy of Oldenburg.

A royal consort is the spouse of a ruling monarch. Consorts of monarchs in the Grand Duchy of Oldenburg and its predecessor states had no constitutional status or power, but many had significant influence over their spouse.

== Overview ==
From the elevation of the County of Oldenburg to a Duchy and later a Grand Duchy, the monarchy of Oldenburg had four royal consorts: one duchess and three grand duchesses. Although their husbands were the rulers of the Oldenburg territory, they were not the heads of the House of Oldenburg; that honor lies with the Oldenburg Kings of Denmark and later the Glücksburg Dukes of Schleswig-Holstein, descended from Count Christian VI. The Queen consorts of Denmark held the title of Countess (later Duchess) of Oldenburg, but it wasn't until 1667 to 1773 that Denmark controlled Oldenburg. Then it was passed to the Russians, who were ruled by another scion of the House of Oldenburg.

All female consorts have had the right to and have held the title of countess, duchess, or grand duchess consort, depending on the years. As all rulers of Oldenburg had to be male due to the Salic law of male succession and total exclusion of female succession, there was never a male consort of Oldeburg. Consorts held the titles, Countess consort of Oldenburg (1088-1774), Duchess of consort Oldenburg (1774-1815/1829), and last of all, Grand Duchess consort of Oldenburg (1815/1829-1918). Had their existed a consort from 1815 to 1829, they would have been in the awkward situation of being a Duchess consort reigning in a Grand duchy. Oldenburg had been elevated to a Grand Duchy in 1815 after the Napoleonic War, but William and Peter I never used the title of Grand Duke of Oldenburg. But William and Peter I had no wives living during that period.

Not all wives of monarchs have become consorts, as they may have died, been divorced, had their marriage declared invalid prior to their husbands' ascending the throne, or married after abdication. Such cases include:

- Adelheid of Oldenburg-Delmenhorst, the only daughter of Otto IV, Count of Delmenhorst; first wife of Dietrich (as Hereditary Prince of the County of Oldenburg), married circa 1401, said to have died already in 1404.
- Sibylle Elisabeth of Brunswick-Dannenberg, the only daughter of Henry III, Duke of Brunswick-Lüneburg; wife of Anthony II (after the partition of Oldenburg, in 1577, with husband receiving Delmenhorst), married circa 1600, died 9 July 1630.
- Friederike of Württemberg, the second daughter of Frederick II Eugene, Duke of Württemberg; wife of Peter I (as heir to the duchy of Oldenburg), married 6 June 1781, died 24 November 1785.
- Adelheid of Anhalt-Bernburg-Schaumburg-Hoym, the second daughter of Victor II, Prince of Anhalt-Bernburg-Schaumburg-Hoym; wife of Augustus I (as Hereditary Grand Duke), married 24 July 1817, died 13 September 1820.
- Ida of Anhalt-Bernburg-Schaumburg-Hoym, the fourth daughter of Victor II, Prince of Anhalt-Bernburg-Schaumburg-Hoym; wife of Augustus I (as Hereditary Grand Duke), married 24 June 1825, died 31 March 1828.
- Elisabeth Anna of Prussia, the second daughter of Prince Frederick Charles of Prussia; wife of Frederick Augustus II (as Hereditary Grand Duke), married 18 February 1878, died 28 August 1895.

From 1774 to the end of the monarchy in 1918, only William, Duke of Oldenburg and Peter I, Duke of Oldenburg have reigned without spouses.

After the Grand Duchy was abolished in 1918, the spouse of the head of the old Grand Ducal family of Oldenburg is the titular Grand Duchess consort of Oldenburg. The current titular grand duchess is Princess Ameli of Löwenstein-Wertheim-Freudenberg, the wife of Anton-Günther, Duke of Oldenburg, the head of the grand ducal family of Oldenburg.

If Duke Christian of Oldenburg, Anton-Günther's son and heir, ascends to the role of Head of the Grand Ducal Family of Oldenburg, his wife, Countess Caroline zu Rantzau, will become the titular Grand Duchess of Oldenburg.

== Countess of Oldenburg (1088–1774) ==
Picture	Name	Father	Birth	Marriage	Became Countess	Ceased to be Countess	Death	Spouse
	Richenza of Elsdorf	Dedo, Count of Godesck, husband of Ida von Elsdorf (Godseck)	1044	?	1088 husband's accession	1108/12 husband's death	?	Elimar I
	Eilika of Werl-Rietberg	Henry, Count of Rietberg (Rietberg)	?	before 1102	1108 husband's accession	1142 husband's death	?	Elimar II
	Kunigunde of Versfleth	Gerbert, Count of Versfleth (Versfleht)	?	before 1102	1142 husband's accession	1169 husband's death	?	Christian I
	Salome of Hostaden-Wickrath	Otto II, Count of Wickrath (Wickrath)	?	before 1145	1169 husband's accession	1209/11 husband's death	?	Maurice I
	Mechthild of Woldenberg	Hoier I, Count of Wöltingerode-Woldenberg (Wöltingerode-Woldenberg)	?	?	1209/11 husband's accession	1251 husband's death	?	Otto I
	Agnes of Altena-Isenberg	Arnold, Count of Altena (Berg)	?	before 1204	1209/11 husband's accession	1238 husband's death	?	Christian II
	Richeza of Hoya-Stumpenhausen	Henry II, Count of Hoya (Hoya)	?	before 1250	1238 husband's accession	1272 husband's death	?	John I
	Hedwig of Oldenburg-Wildeshausen	Henry IV, Count of Oldenburg-Wildeshausen (Oldenburg-Wildeshausen)	?	?	1272 husband's accession	?		Christian III
	Jutta of Bentheim-Tecklenburg	Otto II, Count of Bentheim-Tecklenburg (Holland)	?	?		1278 husband's abdication	before 1287	Christian III
	Elisabeth of Lüneburg	John of Brunswick, Duke of Lüneburg (Lüneburg-Celle)	?	1294		1294/1298		John II (aka IX)
	Hedwig of Diepholz	Conrad, Count of Diepholz (Diepholz)	?	?		1305 husband's abdication	?	John II (aka IX)
	Hedwig of Altbruchhausen	Hildebold, Count of Altbruchausen (Oldenburg-Wildeshausen)	?	?	1305 husband's accession	1324 husband's death	1348	Christian IV
	Mechthild of Bronckhorst	Gijsbert IV, Lord of Bronckhorst (Bronckhorst)	?	?	1305 husband's accession	1338		John XI
	Ingeborg of Itzehoe	Gerhard IV, Count of Holstein-Itzehoe-Plön (Schauenburg)	?	?	1344 husband's accession	1368 husband's death	?	Conrad I
	Kunigunde of Diepholz	? (Diepholz)	?	?	1368 husband's accession	1386 husband's abdication	?	Conrad II
	Elisabeth of Brunswick-Lüneburg	Magnus II, Duke of Brunswick-Lüneburg (Brunswick)	1368	1391		1398 husband's abdication	1420	Maurice III or IV
	Agnes of Hohnstein-Heiringen	Dietrich V, Count of Hohnstein (Hohnstein)	?	1360	1398 husband's accession	1404		Christian V
	Hedvig of Schleswig and Holstein	Gerhard VI, Count of Holstein-Rendsborg, Duke of Schleswig (Schauenburg)	1398	23 November 1423		1436		Dietrich
	Adelheid of Tecklenburg	Otto VIII, Count of Tecklenburg (Schwerin)	1435	1453		2 March 1477		Gerhard VI
	Anna of Anhalt-Zerbst	George I, Prince of Anhalt-Zerbst (Ascania)	?	20 June 1498		10 February 1526 husband's abdication	10 October 1531	John V (aka XIV)
	Sofie of Saxe-Lauenburg	Magnus I, Duke of Saxe-Lauenburg (Ascania)	1521	1 January 1537	1566 husband's accession	13 May 1571		Anthony I
	Elisabeth of Schwarzburg-Blankenburg	Gunther XI, Count of Schwarzburg (Schwarzburg)	13 April 1541	1576		12 November 1603 husband's death	26 December 1612	John VII
	Sophie Katharina of Schleswig-Holstein-Sonderburg	Alexander, Duke of Schleswig-Holstein-Sonderburg (Schleswig-Holstein-Sonderburg)	28 June 1617	1635		19 June 1667 husband's death	22 November 1696	Anthony Günther
	Sophie Amalie of Brunswick-Lüneburg	George, Duke of Brunswick-Lüneburg (Brunswick-Lüneburg)	24 March 1628	1 October 1643	1667; Oldenburg passed to Denmark	9 February 1670 husband's death	20 February 1685	Frederick III of Denmark
	Charlotte Amalie of Hesse-Kassel	William VI, Landgrave of Hesse-Kassel (Hesse-Kassel)	27 April 1650	25 June 1667	9 February 1670 husband's accession	25 August 1699 husband's death	27 March 1714	Christian V of Denmark
	Louise of Mecklenburg-Güstrow	Gustav Adolf, Duke of Mecklenburg-Güstrow (Mecklenburg-Güstrow)	28 August 1667	5 December 1695	25 August 1699 husband's accession	15 March 1721		Frederick IV of Denmark
	Anne Sophie von Reventlow	Conrad, Count of Reventlow (Reventlow)	16 April 1693	4 April 1721		12 October 1730 husband's death	7 January 1743	Frederick IV of Denmark
	Sophia Magdalen of Brandenburg-Kulmbach	Christian Heinrich of Brandenburg-Bayreuth-Kulmbach (Hohenzollern)	28 November 1700	7 August 1721	12 October 1730 husband's accession	6 August 1746 husband's death	27 May 1770	Christian VI of Denmark
	Louise of Great Britain	George II of Great Britain (Hanover)	7 December 1724	11 December 1743	6 August 1746 husband's accession	19 December 1751		Frederick V of Denmark
	Juliana Maria of Brunswick-Wolfenbüttel	Ferdinand Albert II, Duke of Brunswick-Wolfenbüttel (Brunswick-Bevern)	4 September 1729	8 July 1752		13 January 1766 husband's death	10 October 1796	Frederick V of Denmark
	Caroline Matilda of Great Britain	Frederick, Prince of Wales (Hanover)	11 July 1751	8 November 1766		1773; Oldenburg passed to Russia	10 May 1775	Christian VII of Denmark
	Wilhelmina Louisa of Hesse-Darmstadt	Louis IX, Landgrave of Hesse-Darmstadt (Hesse-Darmstadt)	25 June 1755	29 September 1773		1773 ceased to be countess	15 April 1776	Paul I of Russia
	Ulrike Friederike Wilhelmine of Hesse-Kassel	Landgrave Maximilian of Hesse-Kassel (Hesse-Kassel)	31 October 1722	21 November 1752	1773 husband's accession	1774 became Duchess	28 February 1787	Frederick Augustus I

== Duchess of Oldenburg (1774–1829) ==
Picture	Name	Father	Birth	Marriage	Became Duchess	Ceased to be Duchess	Death	Spouse
	Ulrike Friederike Wilhelmine of Hesse-Kassel	Landgrave Maximilian of Hesse-Kassel (Hesse-Kassel)	31 October 1722	21 November 1752	1774 became Duchess	6 July 1785 husband's death	28 February 1787	Frederick Augustus I

== Grand Duchess of Oldenburg (1829–1918) ==
Picture	Name	Father	Birth	Marriage	Became Grand Duchess	Ceased to be Grand Duchess	Death	Spouse
	Cecilia of Sweden	Gustav IV Adolf of Sweden (Holstein-Gottorp)	22 June 1807	5 May 1831		27 January 1844		Augustus I
	Elisabeth of Saxe-Altenburg	Joseph, Duke of Saxe-Altenburg (Saxe-Altenburg)	26 March 1826	10 February 1852	27 February 1853 husband's accession	2 February 1896		Peter II
	Elisabeth of Mecklenburg-Schwerin	Frederick Francis II, Grand Duke of Mecklenburg-Schwerin (Mecklenburg-Schwerin)	10 August 1869	24 October 1896	13 June 1900 husband's accession	11 November 1918 husband's abdication	3 September 1955	Frederick Augustus II

== See also ==
- Counts, dukes and grand dukes of Oldenburg
- List of Danish royal consorts
- List of consorts of Schleswig and Holstein
- List of consorts of Holstein-Sonderburg
- List of Russian royal consorts
