= Lutz Graf Schwerin von Krosigk =

German senior government official (1887–1977)

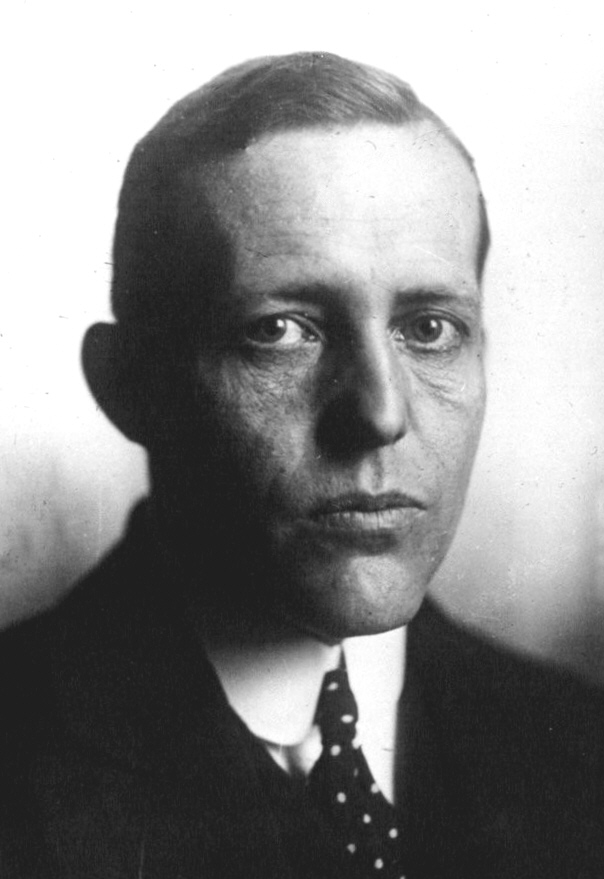
- Krosigk in 1932

Leading Minister of Germany (Note: The title of Chancellor was not used formally. On 2 May 1945, Dönitz appointed him as the Leading Minister and Reich Minister for Foreign Affairs. He was de facto the Chancellor of Germany.)
- In office 2 May 1945 – 23 May 1945 (Note: Krosigk and all members of the government were arrested on 23 May and, therefore, de facto left office. They were replaced de jure by the Allied Control Council established by the Berlin Declaration of 5 June.); De jure until 5 June 1945
- President: Karl Dönitz
- Preceded by: Joseph Goebbels (as Chancellor)
- Succeeded by: Allied Control Council (as a Condominium) (Note: The Berlin Declaration, signed by the Allies on 5 June 1945, did not recognize Dönitz's civilian government; thus, they assumed supreme authority over Germany through the Allied Control Council.)

Minister for Foreign Affairs
- In office 2 May 1945 – 23 May 1945
- Leading Minister: Himself
- Preceded by: Arthur Seyss-Inquart
- Succeeded by: Office abolished

Minister of Finance
- In office 1 June 1932 – 23 May 1945
- Chancellor: Franz von Papen; Kurt von Schleicher; Adolf Hitler; Joseph Goebbels
- Leading Minister: Himself
- Preceded by: Hermann Dietrich
- Succeeded by: Office abolished

Personal details
- Born: Johann Ludwig von Krosigk; 22 August 1887 Rathmannsdorf, German Empire
- Died: 4 March 1977 (aged 89) Essen, West Germany
- Party: Nazi Party (1937–1945)
- Spouse: Ehrengard von Plettenberg (m. 1918)
- Relations: Beatrix von Storch (granddaughter)
- Children: 9
- Parent(s): Erich Adolf Wilhelm (father); Luise Rosalie Ludmilla (mother)
- Education: University of Halle; University of Lausanne; Oriel College, Oxford
- Occupation: Officer, jurist, politician
- Civilian awards: Order of the German Eagle; Golden Party Badge

Military service
- Allegiance: German Empire
- Branch/service: Imperial German Army
- Rank: Oberleutnant
- Battles/wars: World War I
- Military awards: Iron Cross, 1st class

Johann Ludwig "Lutz" Graf Schwerin von Krosigk (born Johann Ludwig von Krosigk; 22 August 1887 – 4 March 1977) was a German senior government official who served as the minister of finance of Germany from 1932 to 1945 and de facto chancellor of Germany during May 1945.

A non-partisan conservative, he was appointed to the post of Minister of Finance by Franz von Papen in 1932. At the request of President Paul von Hindenburg, he continued in that office under Kurt von Schleicher and Adolf Hitler. He and his ministry were involved in the persecution of German and European Jews, including stealing their property and laundering money. During May 1945, after the suicides of Hitler and his designated successor Joseph Goebbels, he also served as "Leading Minister" of the short-lived Flensburg Government of President Karl Dönitz. Schwerin von Krosigk also held the essentially nominal offices of Foreign Minister and Finance Minister in the provisional government that controlled only a small, progressively shrinking portion of Germany, due to the rapid advance of the Allied forces, who finally dissolved it and arrested its members.

Besides Adolf Hitler himself, Schwerin von Krosigk was one of the few members of Hitler's cabinet (along with Wilhelm Frick and Franz Seldte) to serve continuously from Hitler's appointment as Chancellor until his death. By accepting the Golden Party Badge personally bestowed by Adolf Hitler, given for honour on 30 January 1937, he automatically became a member of the Nazi Party (NSDAP) with membership number 3,805,231. He also joined the Academy for German Law in 1937.

At the 1949 Ministries Trial, he was convicted of laundering property stolen from Nazi victims and financing the concentration camps and sentenced to 10 years in prison; his sentence was commuted in 1951. He later worked as an author and publicist. He died on 4 March 1977.

== Early life and education ==
Born as Johann Ludwig von Krosigk on 22 August 1887 into a family of traditional Lutherans in Rathmannsdorf in the Duchy of Anhalt of the German Empire, his father Erich Adolf Wilhelm was a member of an old noble but untitled family of Anhalt and his mother Luise Rosalie Friederike Julie Emma Ludmilla was born a countess of the Schwerin family. In 1925, he was adopted by Alfred Wilhelm Detlof Graf von Schwerin, and promoted himself to a count, taking the name Johann Ludwig Graf Schwerin von Krosigk.

Krosigk studied law and political science at Halle and Lausanne and then, as a Rhodes Scholar, at Oriel College, Oxford.

During World War I, Krosigk served in the German Army, attaining the rank of Lieutenant, and was awarded the Iron Cross, 1st class. On 7 February 1918, during the war, he married a baroness, Ehrengard Freiin von Plettenberg (1895–1979), with whom he had four sons and five daughters. In 1922, he became an Oberregierungsrat (senior government official) and in 1929, a ministerial director and head of the budget department at the finance ministry. In 1931, he joined the department of reparations payments, formed to deal with the reparations Germany still owed the Allied Powers after the Great War.

== Nazi years ==
=== Pre-World War II ===
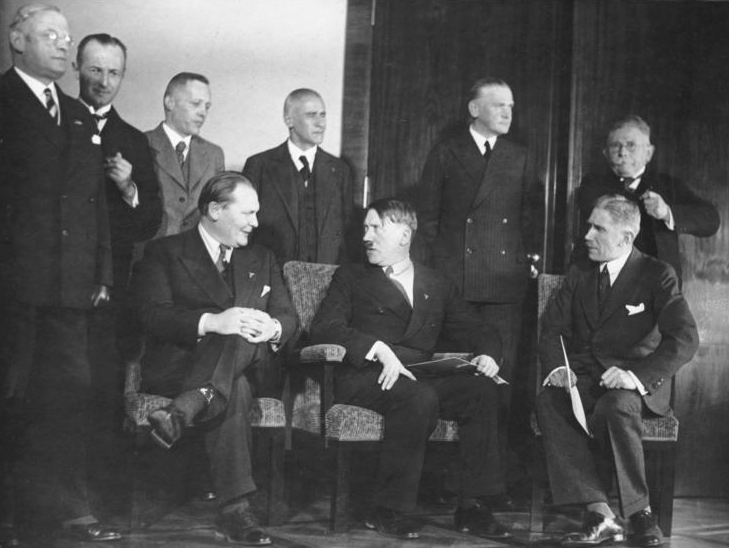
The first meeting of Hitler's cabinet on 30 January 1933, with Krosigk standing third from left

In 1932, Franz von Papen appointed Krosigk as national Minister of Finance, and at the request of President Paul von Hindenburg, he continued in that office under Kurt von Schleicher and throughout the period of Nazi rule. Several members of his family took part in assassination attempts against Adolf Hitler, but not Krosigk himself. He was rarely seen in public, and Hitler did not hold regular cabinet meetings. Following the final meeting of Hitler's cabinet in 1938, Krosigk did not make any public political statements and instead focused on running his ministry.

Krosigk held his position under both Schleicher and Hitler as a representative of the conservative movement in Germany. While he later claimed to have remained in the role only to prevent "worse things" from happening, he welcomed the Nazi Party's rise to power, and both agreed with and contributed to many of its policies. These included measures targeting Germany's Jewish community. While Krosigk's ability to shape Germany's fiscal policies was constrained by the influence of both the President of the Reichsbank and Hermann Göring (in his role as Plenipotentiary of the Four Year Plan), he was able to implement policies. In August 1938 Krosigk sent Hitler a memorandum which strongly argued against starting a war over the Sudeten crisis as the German economy was not yet ready, and claimed that "Communists, Jews and Czechs" were seeking to lure the country into a premature conflict. He argued that Germany should instead "await her hour" and initiate war once it had completed building up its military and economy.

=== World War II ===
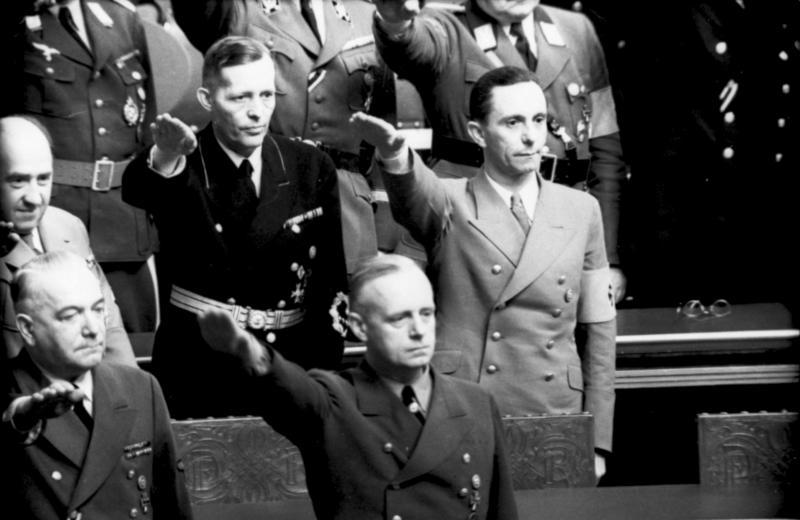
Clockwise from top left: Funk, Krosigk, Goebbels, Ribbentrop and Neurath salute at the Reichstag, 4 May 1941

From 1939, Krosigk's ministry was increasingly focused on persecuting Jews and stealing their belongings as well as illegally laundering money.

In February 1945, von Krosigk stressed the importance of preserving Germany's remaining industrial capacities in a letter to Reich Minister of Armaments and War Production Albert Speer. This was motivated by his mistaken belief that the Allied bombing campaign directed at Germany had the goal of destroying the country's industry so that it could not be captured by the Soviet Union, and that retaining industrial capacity would position Germany to re-establish friendly relations with the Western Allies following the war. It is unclear whether this had any influence on Speer's actions to prevent the implementation of the "scorched earth" policy ordered by Hitler.

In his final testament, Hitler selected Krosigk to continue as finance minister after his death. He was to serve in a government headed by Goebbels as Chancellor (Reichskanzler). However, Goebbels himself committed suicide only a day later, on 1 May 1945. Reichspräsident Karl Dönitz then asked Schwerin von Krosigk to succeed him as Chancellor. He declined but accepted the position of "Leading Minister" the following day. In a broadcast to the German people on 2 May 1945, he became one of the first commentators to refer to an "Iron Curtain" across Europe, a phrase he had picked up from an article by Joseph Goebbels and which was later made famous by Winston Churchill.

Rapidly advancing Allied forces limited the jurisdiction of the new German government to an area around Flensburg near the Danish border, where Dönitz's headquarters were located, along with Mürwik. Accordingly, this administration was referred to as the Flensburg Government. Dönitz and Schwerin von Krosigk attempted to negotiate an armistice with the Western Allies while continuing to resist the Soviet Army. On 7 May 1945, Dönitz authorised the signature of the German Instrument of Surrender to the Allies, which took place in Reims before General Dwight D. Eisenhower; Dönitz would later authorise the Wehrmacht to sign another instrument of surrender in Berlin, in a ceremony presided over by the Soviets. On 23 May 1945, the Flensburg Government was dissolved by order of the Supreme Allied Commander, General Eisenhower, and its members arrested.

== Post-World War II ==
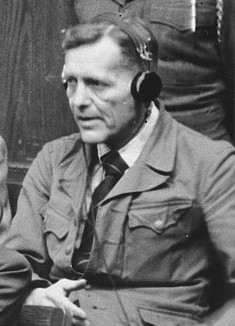
Graf Schwerin von Krosigk on trial in Nuremberg

Krosigk was put on trial at Nuremberg, along with other surviving leading members of the Nazi government. At the conclusion of the Ministries Trial in 1949 he was found guilty of laundering property stolen from Nazi victims and financing the concentration camps, and sentenced to ten years' imprisonment. His sentence was reviewed by the "Peck Panel". He was released during an amnesty in 1951. In later years, Schwerin von Krosigk wrote several books on economic policy and two versions of his memoirs. Schwerin von Krosigk died on 4 March 1977 in Essen, West Germany, at the age of 89.

== Private life ==
He was married to his cousin, Baroness Ehrengard von Plettenberg-Heeren (1895–1979), daughter of Count Friedrich von Plettenberg-Heeren (1863–1924) and his wife, Countess Ehrengard von Krosigk (1873–1943). They had nine children.

Among them, his daughter, Felicitas-Anita, Countess Schwerin von Krosigk (b. 1941), is the mother of Alternative for Germany Member of the German Bundestag Beatrix von Storch.

His other daughter, Countess Ehrengard Bertha Minetta Schwerin von Krosigk (1922–2012), married Gottfried von Bismarck (1921–2001), younger brother of Klaus von Bismarck and Philipp von Bismarck, brother in law of Gottfried von Einem and uncle of Caspar von Einem, Minister of the Interior of Austria.

== Works ==
- Es geschah in Deutschland, 1951;
- Die große Zeit des Feuers – Der Weg der deutschen Industrie, 3 volumes, 1959;
- Alles auf Wagnis – der Kaufmann gestern, heute und morgen, 1963;
- Persönliche Erinnerungen, memoirs, 3 volumes, 1974;
- Staatsbankrott (Studie über die deutsche Finanzpolitik von 1920 bis 1945), 1975;
- Memoiren (short version of Persönliche Erinnerungen), 1977.

== Notes ==
Political offices
Preceded by Hermann R. Dietrich	Minister of Finance; 1932–1945	Position abolished
Preceded by Joseph Goebbels	Chancellor of Germany; 1945	Position abolished
Preceded by Arthur Seyss-Inquart	Minister for Foreign Affairs; 1945	Position abolished
