= Harmsdorf, Ostholstein =

Harmsdorf
- Municipality
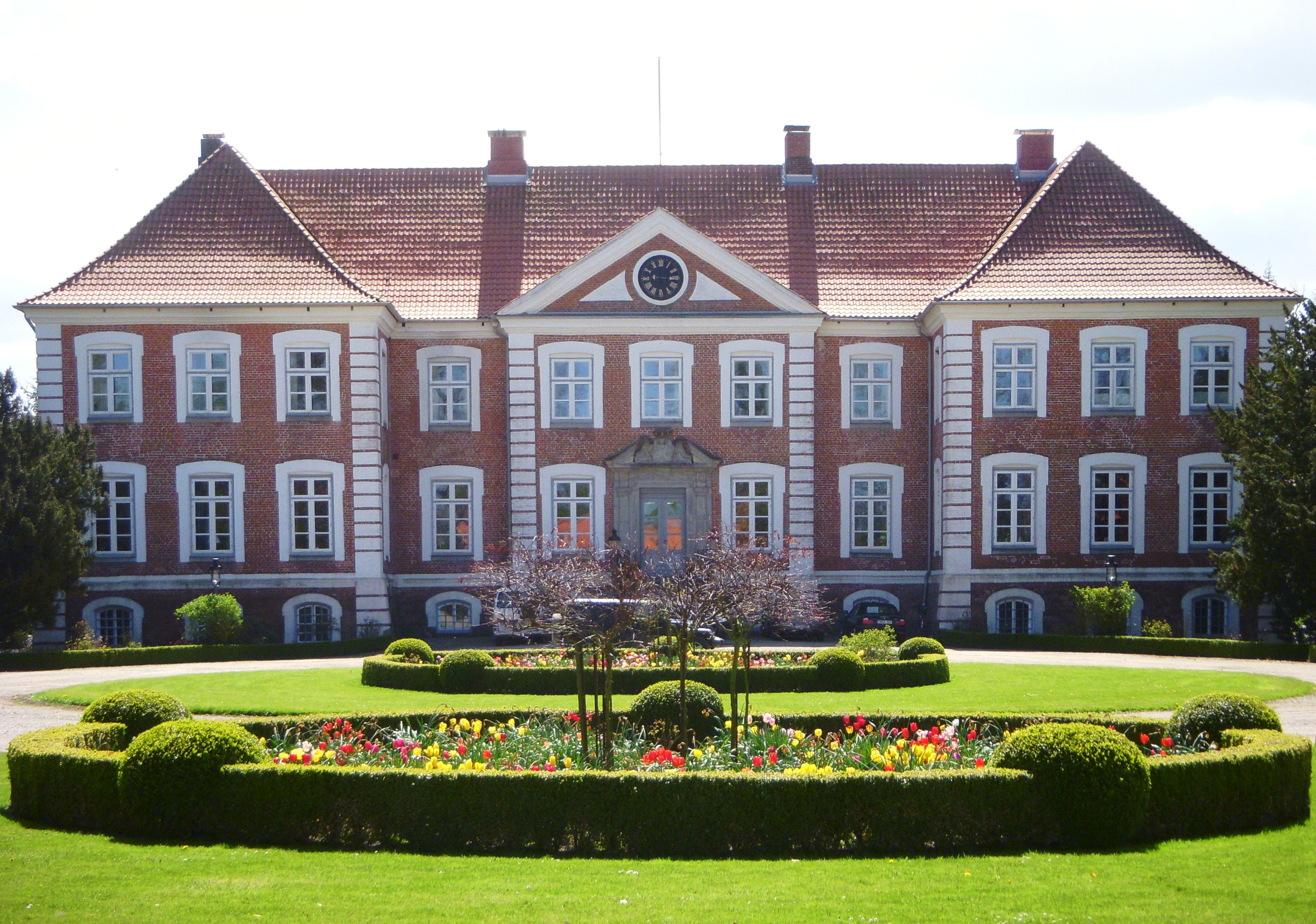
- Gut Güldenstein in Harmsdorf

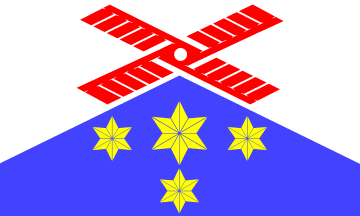
- Flag Coat of arms

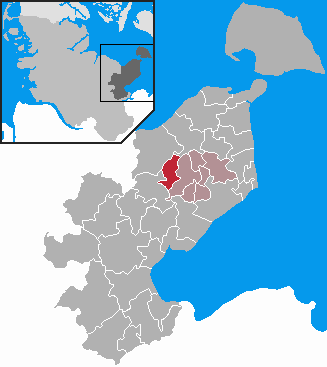
- Location of Harmsdorf within Ostholstein district
- Interactive map of Harmsdorf
- Location within Germany Location within Schleswig-Holstein
- Coordinates: 54°15′N 10°49′E
- Country: Germany
- State: Schleswig-Holstein
- District: Ostholstein
- Municipal assoc.: Lensahn

Government
  - Mayor: Reinhard Schöning

Area
  - Total: 17.82 km^{2} (6.88 sq mi)
- Elevation: 29 m (95 ft)

Population (2025-12-31)
  - Total: 684
  - Density: 38.4/km^{2} (99.4/sq mi)
- Time zone: UTC+01:00 (CET)
  - Summer (DST): UTC+02:00 (CEST)
- Postal codes: 23738
- Dialling codes: 04363
- Vehicle registration: OH
- Website: www.lensahn.de

Harmsdorf (German pronunciation: [ˈhaʁmsdɔʁf]) is a municipality in the district of Ostholstein, in Schleswig-Holstein, Germany.
