= Rastede Palace =

Castle in Rastede, Germany

Coordinates: 53°14′33″N 8°12′07″E

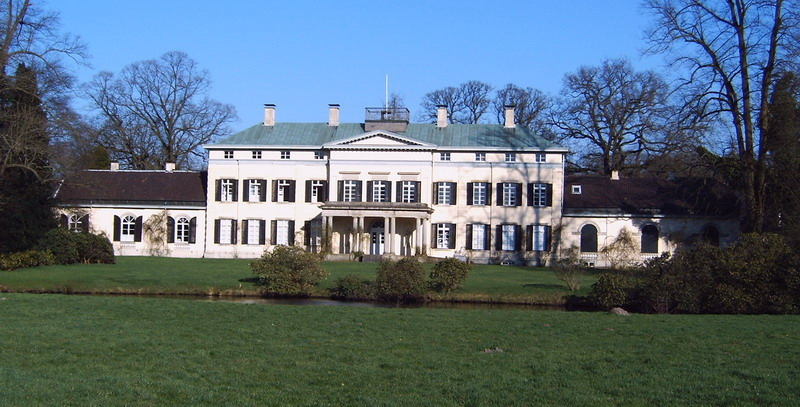
Rastede Palace

Rastede Palace (German: Schloss Rastede) is a country estate at Rastede near Oldenburg, Germany. The town of Rastede is about 12km (7.4 miles) north of Oldenburg.

In the Middle Ages, Rastede was the house monastery of the House of Oldenburg. After the Reformation it became a country residence of the Counts and later Dukes and Grand Dukes of Oldenburg. It is still lived in by their descendants. Today it is owned by Christian, Duke of Oldenburg. Therefore it is not open to the public, however the surrounding parkland has public access.

== History ==
The monastery in Rastede was founded in 1091 by a count Huno and his wife Willna. Friedrich, possibly Huno's son, completed the construction, which was finally consecrated in 1091 as a Benedictine monastery in honor of the Virgin Mary. Five years later, in 1096, the monastery church was consecrated. In the 12th century, the hereditary position of the monastery's bailiffs passed to the early generations of the House of Oldenburg (the "Egilmaren family", named after their founding father Egilmar I and his descendants of the same name). It became their House monastery.

In the course of the Reformation, the Rastede monastery lost its spiritual basis. Anthony Günther, Count of Oldenburg, had large stables built in 1612. The former monastery was demolished in 1643 and replaced by a new hunting lodge, which was used as a summer residence. After Anthony Günther's death without a legitimate heir, most of his land fell into the hands of the elder line of the House of Oldenburg, the Danish royal family, who are direct male descendants of Christian I, Count of Oldenburg, elected as King of Denmark in 1448. For more than a hundred years, the county was governed in personal union with Denmark. The Danish royal family did not particularly care for the area. For 40 years, it was the home of the disgraced Princess Sophie Eleonore of Schleswig-Holstein-Sonderburg-Beck, daughter of August Philipp, Duke of Schleswig-Holstein-Sonderburg-Beck and his third wife Marie Sibylle of Nassau-Saarbrücken. It is unclear how she came to live there, though she did write to King Frederick IV of Denmark to thank him for allowing her to live there with a pension. Apparently, the castle was in quite a dilapidated state already, and she often asked for funds for repairs. She requested to be buried in the nearby St.-Ulrichs-Kirche, and she bequeathed 100 thalers to the church. She is now buried in the crypt of the church. Her sarcophagus was reportedly opened by Canadian soldiers looking for treasures in 1945. Sophie Eleanore had her hands folded still, and she was completely mummified.

In 1750, the Danish governor, Rochus Friedrich Count of Lynar, sold the castle to the judiciary Christoph Römer. He had the palace rebuilt by the Dutch architect Cornelis Redelykheid based on a Dutch model into a three-wing building wing with many baroque style elements. He had the garden laid out in the French style.

In 1777 the later Grand Duke Peter I of Oldenburg bought back the estate and had the house redesigned in a contemporary fashion between 1780 and 1791. The palace park was laid out by Carl Ferdinand Bosse, who was appointed garden architect in 1784. Bosse also brought the rhododendron to the Ammerland, which would later become the symbol of the district. In 1816 the north wing was redesigned under the direction of Carl Heinrich Slevogt and Otto Lasius and the attic was changed. The sculptor Eduard Demitrius Högl provided the hall of the palace with stucco work.

The Erbprinzenpalais (Lodge of the Hereditary Prince) is now on the opposite side of the country road that runs in front of the palace. The country house was acquired in 1822 by Peter and remodeled for his son, Hereditary Prince Augustus. An English landscaped garden was laid out. In 1882, Augustus' son, the then Grand Duke Peter II, had the building rebuilt in the style of historicism during the second half of the 19th century. His granddaughter Duchess Sophia Charlotte of Oldenburg lived here after her divorce from Prince Eitel Friedrich of Prussia. After a restoration in the 1980s, the current municipal building serves as a cultural center and event location.

=== Gallery ===
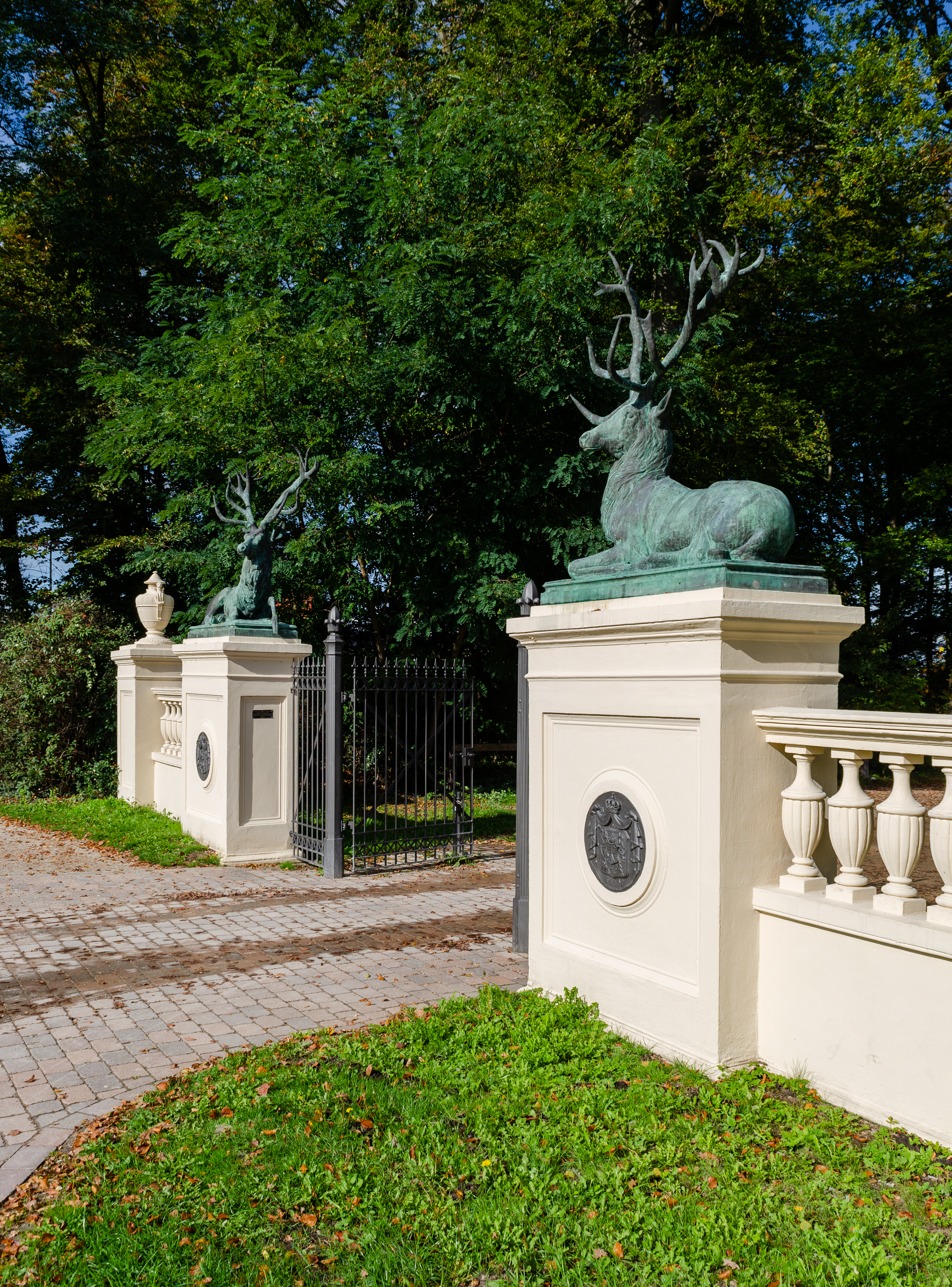
Entrance gate

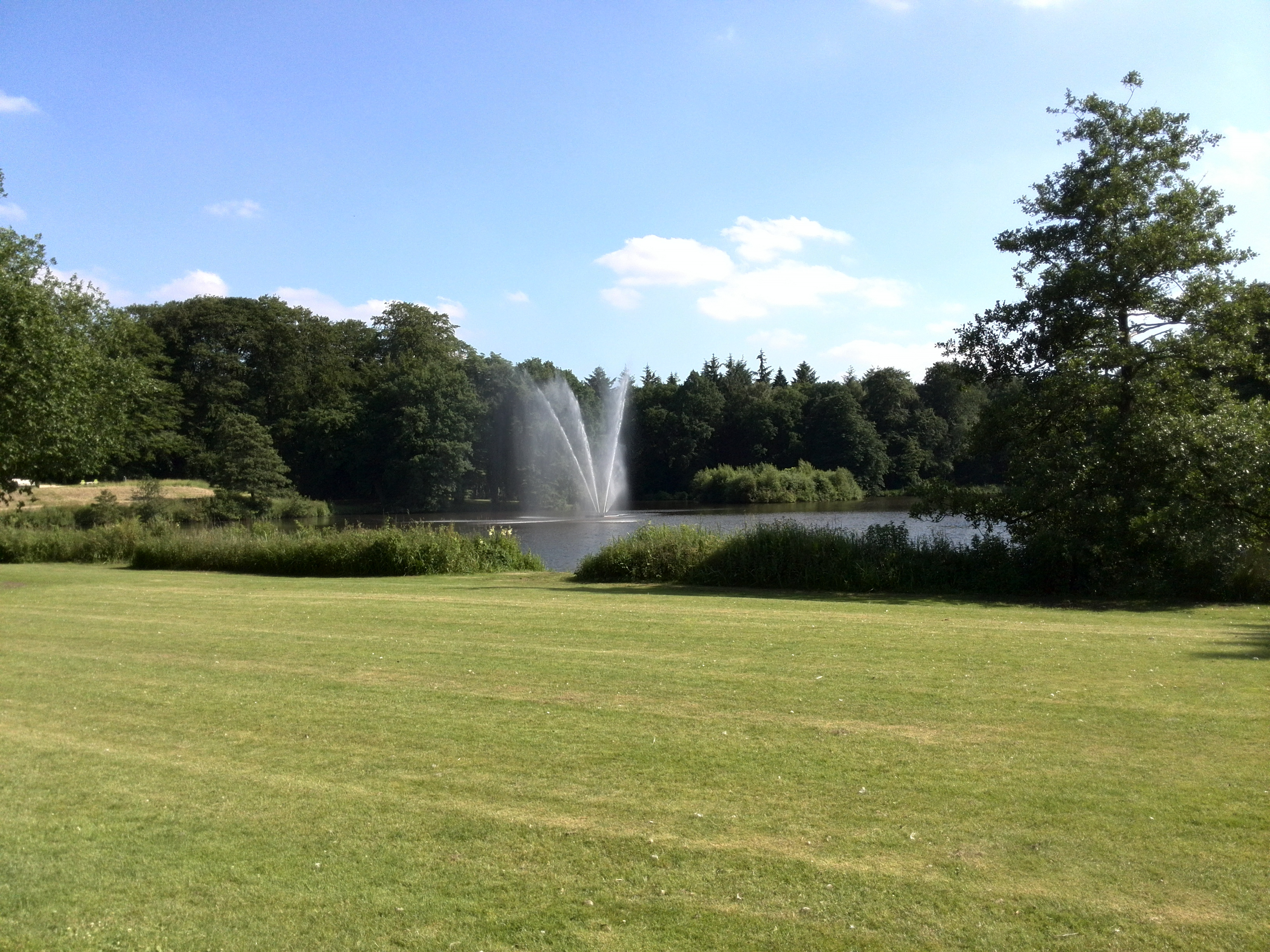
Park

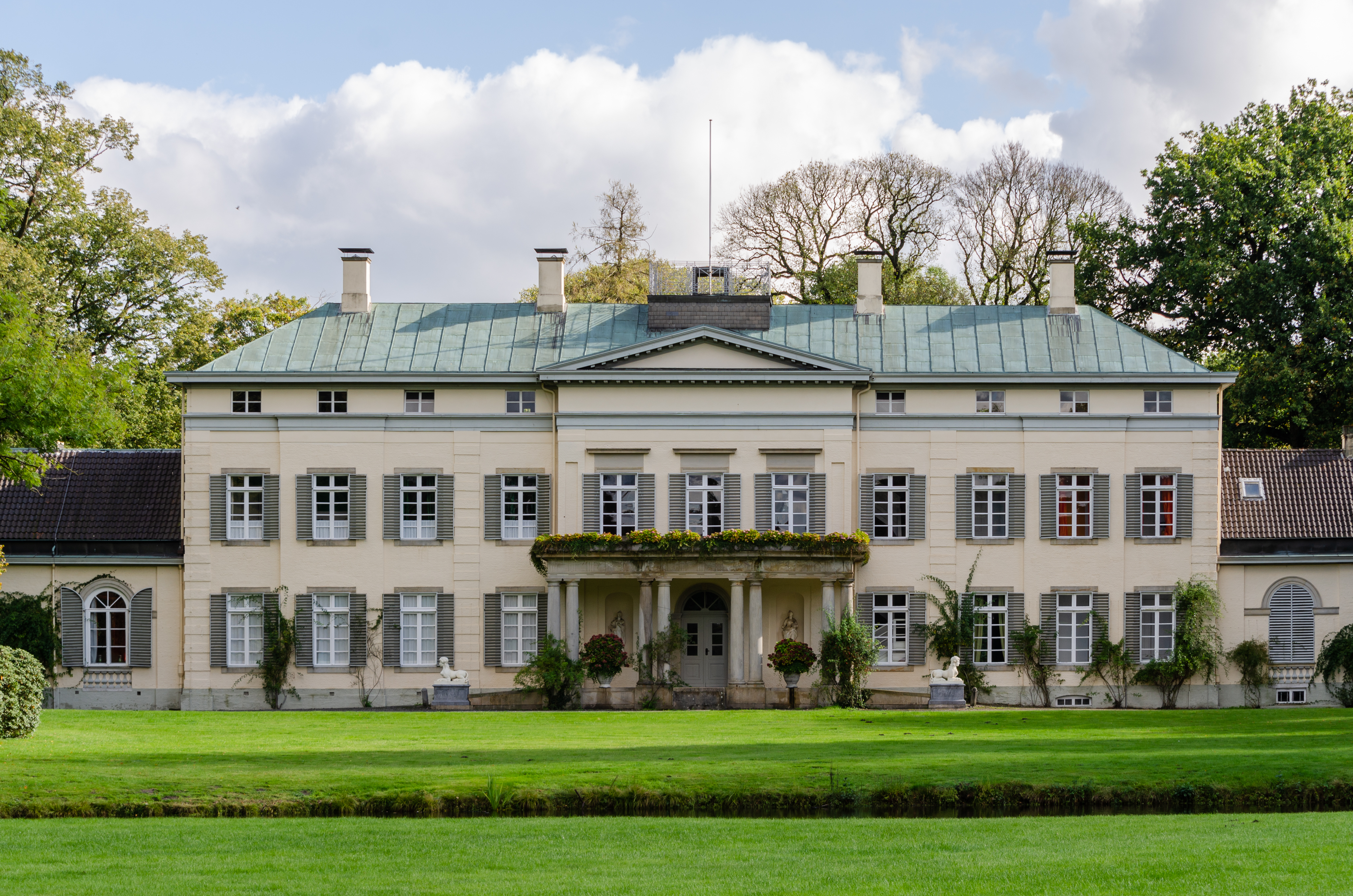
The main house

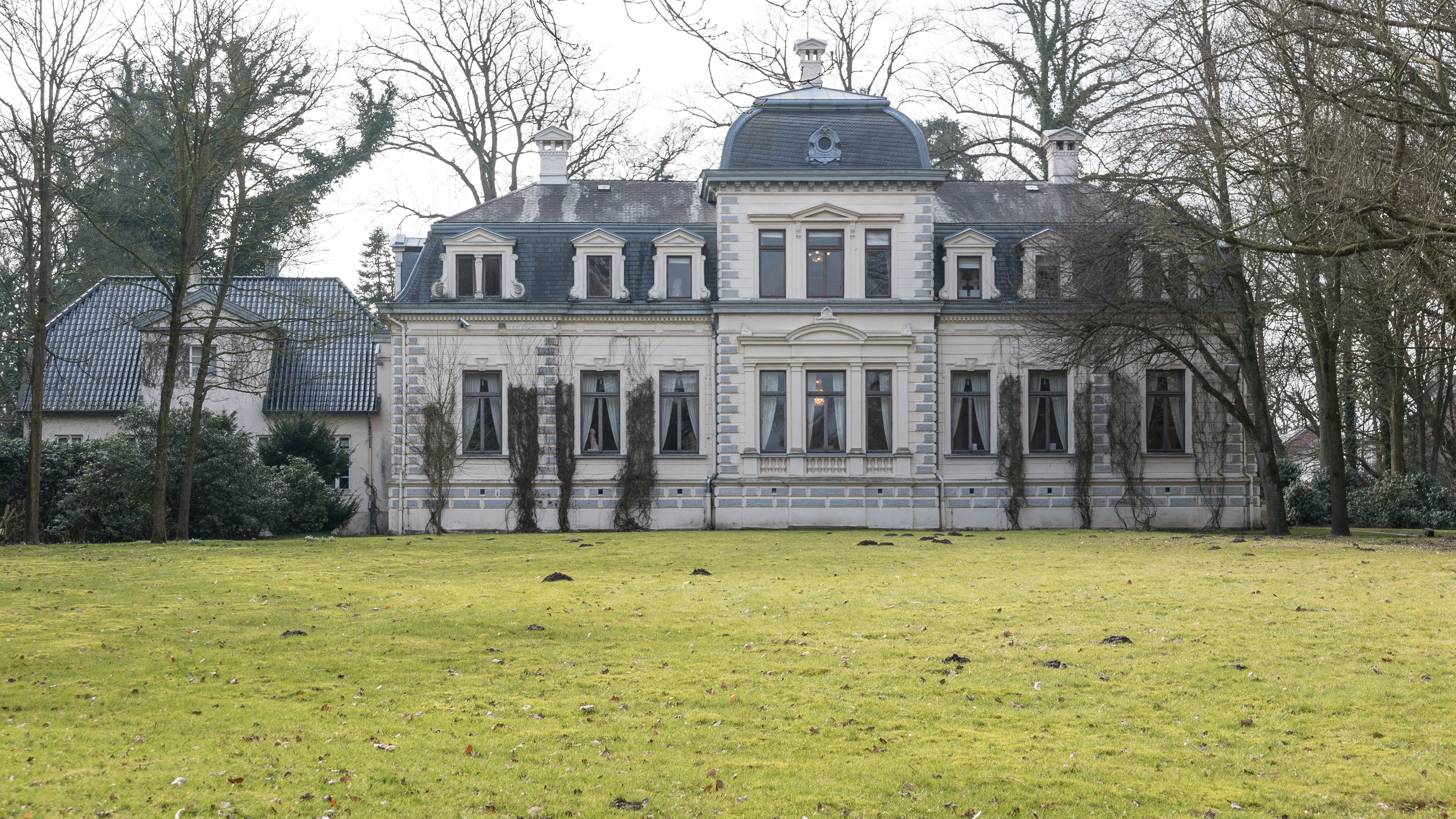
Lodge of the Hereditary Prince
