= Duchess Elisabeth Alexandrine of Mecklenburg-Schwerin =

Grand Duchess of Oldenburg from 1900 to 1918

Elisabeth of Mecklenburg-Schwerin
- Duchess Elisabeth of Mecklenburg-Schwerin, c. 1907.

Grand Duchess consort of Oldenburg
- Tenure: 13 June 1900 – 11 November 1918
- Born: 10 August 1869; Schwerin, Mecklenburg-Schwerin
- Died: 3 September 1955 (aged 86); Schloß Schaumburg, Germany
- Burial: Ducal (Herzogliches) Mausoleum, Gertrudenfriedhof, Oldenburg
- Spouse: Frederick Augustus II, Grand Duke of Oldenburg (m. 1896; died 1931)
- Issue Detail: Nikolaus, Hereditary Grand Duke of Oldenburg; Duke Frederick Augustus; Duchess Alexandrine; Ingeborg Alix, Princess Stephan Alexander of Schaumburg-Lippe; Altburg, Hereditary Princess of Waldeck and Pyrmont
- House: Mecklenburg-Schwerin
- Father: Frederick Francis II, Grand Duke of Mecklenburg
- Mother: Princess Marie of Schwarzburg-Rudolstadt

Duchess Elisabeth of Mecklenburg-Schwerin (10 August 1869 – 3 September 1955) was a daughter of Frederick Francis II, Grand Duke of Mecklenburg by his third wife Princess Marie of Schwarzburg-Rudolstadt. By her marriage to Frederick Augustus II, she became the consort of the last reigning Grand Duke of Oldenburg.

== Family ==
Elisabeth was related to many of Europe's royal families. She was the eldest child of Frederick Francis II, Grand Duke of Mecklenburg by his third wife, Princess Marie of Schwarzburg-Rudolstadt. She was an older sister of Hendrik, Prince consort of the Netherlands, husband of Queen Wilhelmina of the Netherlands, making her an aunt of Queen Juliana of the Netherlands. She was also a younger half-sister of Frederick Francis III, Grand Duke of Mecklenburg-Schwerin. Through Frederick Francis, she was an aunt of Alexandrine, Queen of Denmark and Cecilie, German Crown Princess. Elisabeth was also a half sister of Marie, Grand Duchess of Russia, who was the mother of Grand Duke Cyril Vladimirovich of Russia, the pretender to the Russian throne.

Her paternal grandparents were Paul Frederick, Grand Duke of Mecklenburg and Princess Alexandrine of Prussia. Her maternal grandparents were Prince Adolph of Schwarzburg-Rudolstadt and Princess Mathilde of Schönburg-Waldenburg.

== Marriage ==
On 24 October 1896, Elisabeth married Frederick Augustus, Hereditary Grand Duke of Oldenburg. His first wife Elisabeth Anna had died the previous year, leaving only one surviving daughter: Duchess Sophia Charlotte of Oldenburg. Frederick Augustus was thus in need of a male heir. He succeeded as Grand Duke of Oldenburg in 1900, making Elisabeth Grand Duchess consort of Oldenburg.

They had five children:

Name	Birth	Death	Notes
Nicolas Frederick William, Hereditary Grand Duke of Oldenburg	10 August 1897	3 April 1970	married Princess Helena of Waldeck and Pyrmont
Duke Frederick Augustus	25 March 1900	26 March 1900	twin with Alexandrine, died in infancy
Duchess Alexandrine	25 March 1900	26 March 1900	twin with Frederick Augustus, died in infancy
Duchess Ingeborg Alix	20 July 1901	10 January 1996	married Prince Stephan Alexander Victor of Schaumburg-Lippe; their children included Princess Marie Alix of Schaumburg-Lippe
Duchess Altburg Marie Mathilde Olga	19 May 1903	16 June 2001	married Josias, Hereditary Prince of Waldeck and Pyrmont. Altburg and Josias were the parents of Wittekind Fürst zu Waldeck und Pyrmont.

Frederick was forced to abdicate his throne at the end of World War I, when the former Grand Duchy of the German Empire joined the post-war German Republic. He and his family took up residence at Rastede Castle, where he took up farming and local industrial interests. A year after his abdication, he asked the Oldenburg Diet for a yearly allowance of 150,000 marks, stating that his financial condition was "extremely precarious".

In 1931, Frederick died in Rastede.

Elisabeth died on 3 September 1955, having been widowed for 24 years.

== Honours ==
- Mecklenburg: Dame's Decoration of the House Order of the Wendish Crown, in Diamonds

Duchess Elisabeth Alexandrine of Mecklenburg-Schwerin House of Mecklenburg-Schwerin Cadet branch of the House of Mecklenburg Born: 29 September 1882 Died: 30 August 1963
German royalty
Vacant Title last held by Princess Elisabeth of Saxe-Altenburg	Grand Duchess consort of Oldenburg; 13 June 1900 – 11 November 1918	Monarchy abolished German revolution
Titles in pretence
Loss of title Monarchy abolished	— TITULAR — Grand Duchess of Oldenburg; 11 November 1918 – 24 February 1931; Reason for succession failure: Grand Duchy abolished in 1918	Succeeded by Princess Helena of Waldeck and Pyrmont
