= Princess Marie of Schwarzburg-Rudolstadt =

Grand Duchess of Mecklenburg-Schwerin from 1868 to 1883

Princess Marie
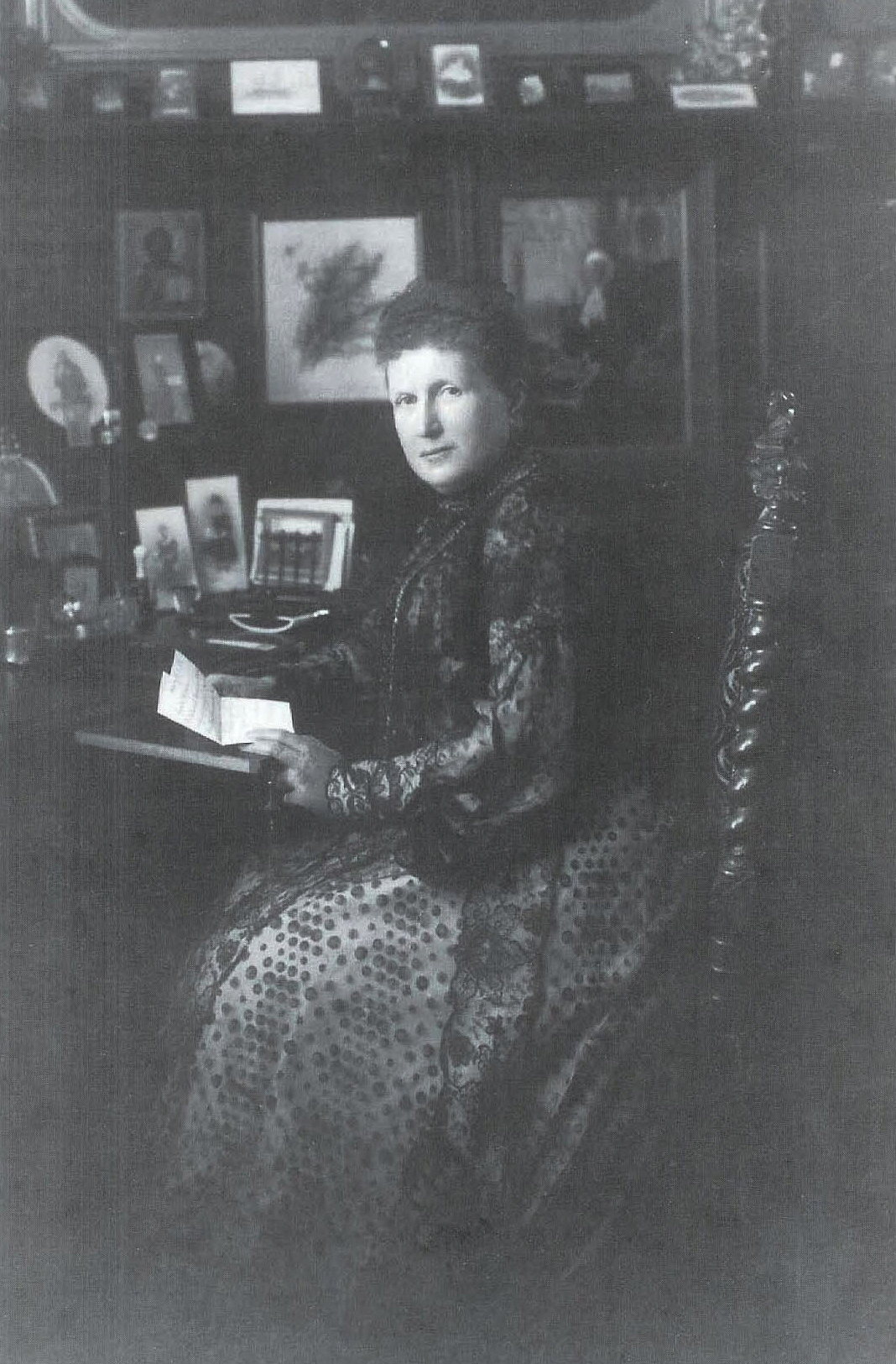

Grand Duchess consort of Mecklenburg-Schwerin
- Tenure: 4 July 1868 – 15 April 1883
- Born: 29 January 1850; Raben Steinfeld, Mecklenburg-Schwerin
- Died: 22 April 1922 (aged 72); The Hague, Netherlands
- Spouse: Frederick Francis II, Grand Duke of Mecklenburg-Schwerin (m. 1868; died 1883)
- Issue: Elisabeth Alexandrine, Grand Duchess of Oldenburg; Duke Friedrich William; Duke Adolf Friedrich; Hendrik, Prince Consort of The Netherlands
Names
- Marie Caroline Augusta
- House: Schwarzburg-Rudolstadt
- Father: Prince Adolf of Schwarzburg-Rudolstadt
- Mother: Princess Mathilde of Schönburg-Waldenburg

Princess Marie of Schwarzburg-Rudolstadt (German: Prinzessin Marie von Schwarzburg-Rudolstadt; 29 January 1850 – 22 April 1922) was the consort and third wife of Frederick Francis II, Grand Duke of Mecklenburg-Schwerin. She was the mother of Prince Hendrik, consort of Queen Wilhelmina of the Netherlands and father of Queen Juliana.

== Early life ==
Princess Marie of Schwarzburg-Rudolstadt, the first child of Prince Adolph of Schwarzburg-Rudolstadt and his wife, Princess Mathilde of Schönburg-Waldenburg, was born at Raben Steinfeld, Mecklenburg-Schwerin. Her paternal great-grandfathers were Frederick Charles, Prince of Schwarzburg-Rudolstadt and Frederick V, Landgrave of Hesse-Homburg.

Her family belonged to the Principality of Schwarzburg-Rudolstadt. Her brother was Günther Victor, Prince of Schwarzburg.

== Marriage ==
On 4 July 1868 in Rudolstadt, Schwarzburg-Rudolstadt, Marie married Frederick Francis II, Grand Duke of Mecklenburg-Schwerin, son of Paul Frederick, Grand Duke of Mecklenburg-Schwerin. Previously, Frederick Francis had been married twice: In 1849, he married Princess Augusta Reuss of Köstritz but she died in 1862. Two years later, Frederick Francis married secondly to Princess Anna of Hesse and by Rhine but less than a year after their marriage, Anna also died. At the time of the marriage, Frederick Francis was 45 and Marie 18. Together they had four children:

- Duchess Elisabeth Alexandrine of Mecklenburg-Schwerin (10 August 1869 – 3 September 1955) she married Frederick Augustus II, Grand Duke of Oldenburg on 24 October 1896. They had five children.
- Duke Friedrich Willhelm of Mecklenburg (5 April 1871 – 22 September 1897)
- Duke Adolf Friedrich of Mecklenburg (10 October 1873 – 5 August 1969) he married Princess Viktoria Feodora of Reuss-Schleiz on 24 April 1917. They had one daughter, Woizlawa Feodora. He remarried Princess Elisabeth of Stolberg-Rossla on 15 October 1924.
- Duke Henry of Mecklenburg-Schwerin (19 April 1876 – 3 July 1934) he married Queen Wilhelmina of the Netherlands on 7 February 1901. They had one surviving child, Queen Juliana of the Netherlands. He is great-grandfather of the present King of the Netherlands and Duke of Parma.

== Death ==
Marie died in 1922 in The Hague. She was in The Hague to congratulate Prince Henry on his 46th birthday. The royal hearse brought the body from Noordeinde Palace to the railway station. The coffin then went by train to Germany, where the princess was buried.

== Legacy ==
She was described in the 1952 memoirs of Crown Princess Cecilie, her husband's granddaughter:

"Simple and modest by nature, she was a reserved and deeply religious woman of outstanding intellectual attainments. her exceptional delicacy of feeling made her hate intrigue and gossip with all her heart and she could never believe or even say anything disparaging of her fellow-mortals. She had a deep tranquillity of mind, and was always equable; she was moderate in everything and always tried to be just. Grandmama Marie was an accomplished horsewoman in her youth, and even in her later years she was an indefatigable mountain-climber. She looked at Art and nature with wide-open, comprehending eyes, and she liked to travel with my grandfather on the long journeys which he made, as for example in 1872 when they visited the East, in spite of all the hardships which were at that time inseparable from such journeys. At an early age she recognised Wagner's genius, and until the time of the war, although not a passionate "Wagnerian" she was one of the most faithful visitors to Bayreuth; she had been present, with my grandfather, at the first festival performances. She had a great liking for amateur theatricals and showed talent both in acting and as stage-manager. She was devoted to her work for the benevolent societies and institutions of the country, some of which were organised after the war of 1870. She was patron, among other institutions, of the "Marie-Freuen-Verein" in Mecklenburg; and the great esteem which she enjoyed in her country during her lifetime is preserved in the name of the "Marienhaus" in Schwerin, a nurses' training home and hospital which she founded."

== Ancestry ==
Ancestors of Princess Marie of Schwarzburg-Rudolstadt

8. Frederick Charles, Prince of Schwarzburg-Rudolstadt
4. Prince Charles Günther of Schwarzburg-Rudolstadt
9. Princess Augusta of Schwarzburg-Rudolstadt
2. Prince Adolph of Schwarzburg-Rudolstadt
10. Frederick V, Landgrave of Hesse-Homburg
5. Landgravine Louise Ulrike of Hesse-Homburg
11. Landgravine Caroline of Hesse-Darmstadt
1. Princess Marie of Schwarzburg-Rudolstadt
12. Otto, Prince of Schönburg-Waldenburg
6. Otto Victor, Prince of Schönburg-Waldenburg
13. Countess Henriette of Reuss-Köstritz
3. Princess Mathilde of Schönburg-Waldenburg
14. Louis Frederick II, Prince of Schwarzburg-Rudolstadt
7. Princess Thekla of Schwarzburg-Rudolstadt
15. Landgravine Ulrike Louise Caroline of Hesse-Homburg

Princess Marie of Schwarzburg-Rudolstadt House of Schwarzburg-Rudolstadt Cadet branch of the House of Schwarzburg Born: 29 January 1850 Died: 22 April 1922
German royalty
Vacant Title last held by Princess Anna of Hesse and by Rhine	Grand Duchess consort of Mecklenburg-Schwerin; 4 July 1868 – 15 April 1883	Succeeded by Grand Duchess Anastasia Mikhailovna of Russia
