= Rastede =

- Municipality
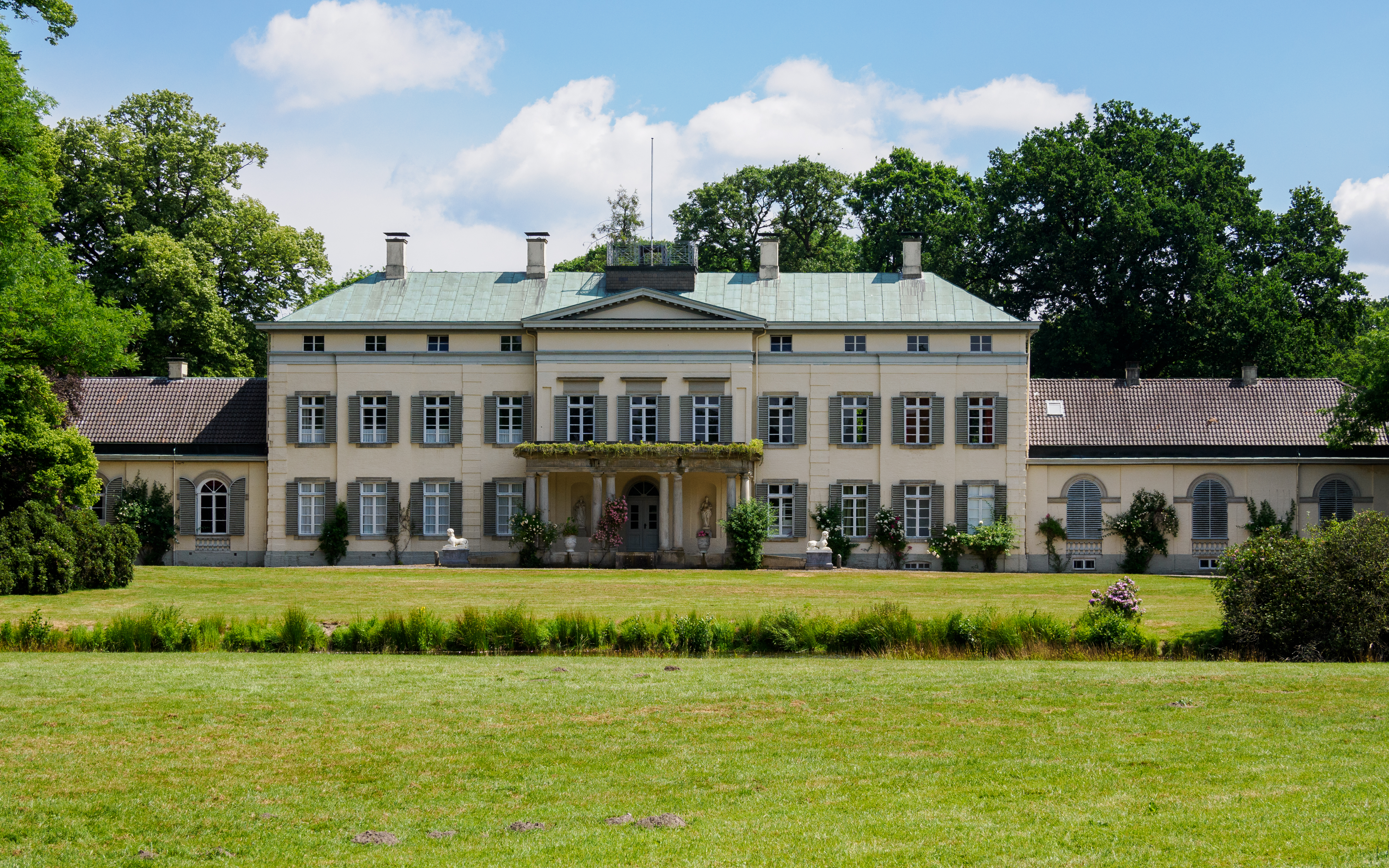
- Rastede Palace

- Flag Coat of arms

- Location of Rastede within Ammerland district
- Interactive map of Rastede
- Location within Germany Location within Lower Saxony
- Coordinates: 53°15′N 8°12′E
- Country: Germany
- State: Lower Saxony
- District: Ammerland
- Subdivisions: 27 districts

Government
  - Mayor (2019–24): Lars Krause (SPD)

Area
  - Total: 123.6 km^{2} (47.7 sq mi)
- Elevation: 10 m (33 ft)

Population (2025-12-31)
  - Total: 22,936
  - Density: 185.6/km^{2} (480.6/sq mi)
- Time zone: UTC+01:00 (CET)
  - Summer (DST): UTC+02:00 (CEST)
- Postal codes: 26180
- Dialling codes: 04402
- Vehicle registration: WST
- Website: www.rastede.de

Rastede (German pronunciation: [ʁaˈsteːdə, -ˈʃteː-]; Low German: Raastäe/Raas) is a municipality in the Ammerland district, in Lower Saxony, Germany. It is situated approximately 12 km north of Oldenburg. It is the site of the Schloss Rastede.

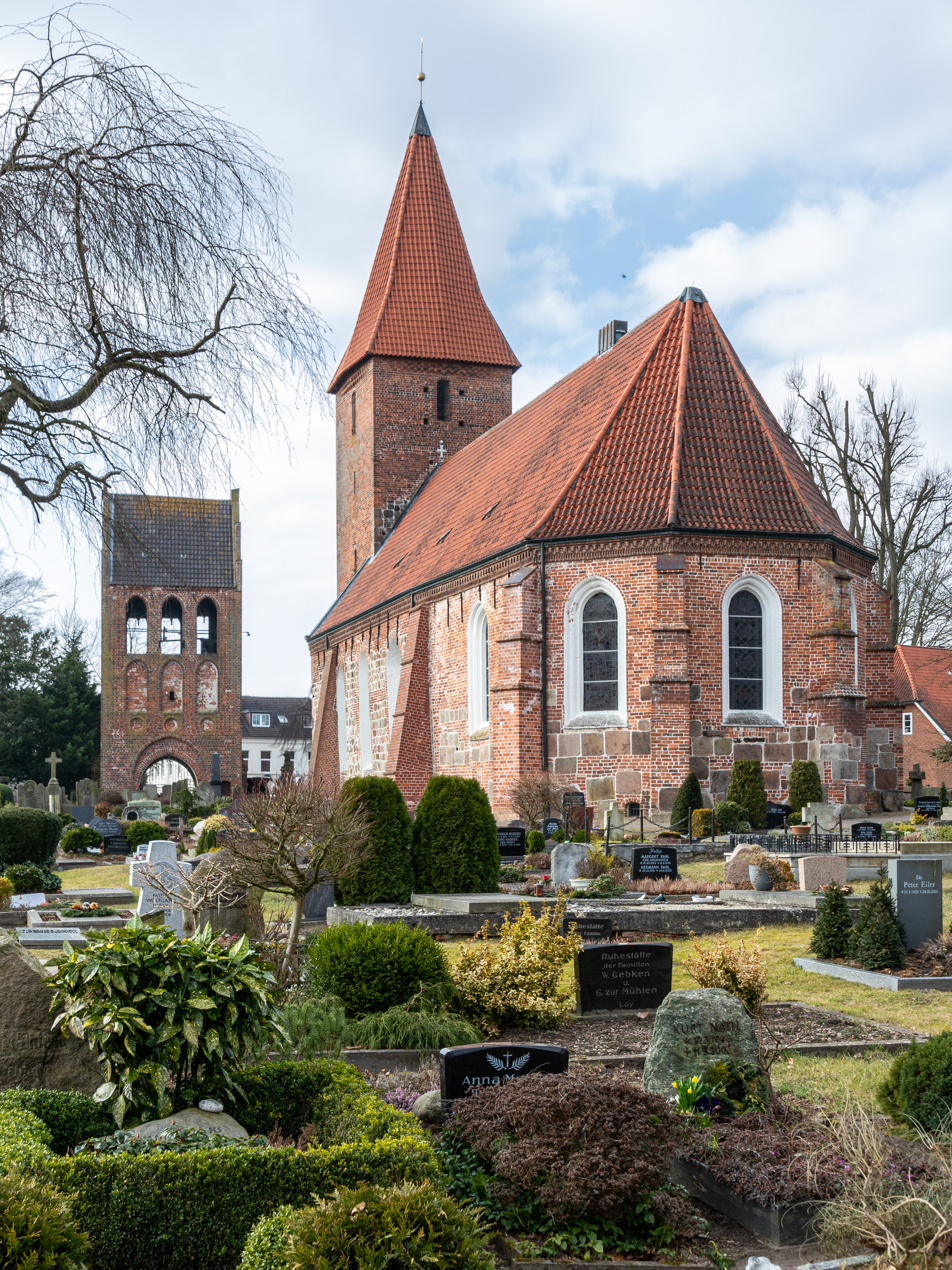
St Ulrich’s Church

The Rastede railway station is located at the Oldenburg–Wilhelmshaven railway.

== Notable people ==
- Hermann Schussler (1842-1919), German water-systems engineer and architect of dams
- Augustus, Grand Duke of Oldenburg (1783-1853), Grand Duke of Oldenburg
- Christian, Duke of Oldenburg (born 1955), Duke of Oldenburg

== Economy ==
The aerospace machine manufacturer Broetje-Automation GmbH is based in Rastede. Customers include Airbus, Boeing, Bombardier, Embraer, Premium Aerotec, Mitsubishi and many other companies.
