= Princess Elisabeth of Saxe-Altenburg (1826–1896) =

Grand Duchess of Oldenburg from 1853 to 1896

Elisabeth of Saxe-Altenburg
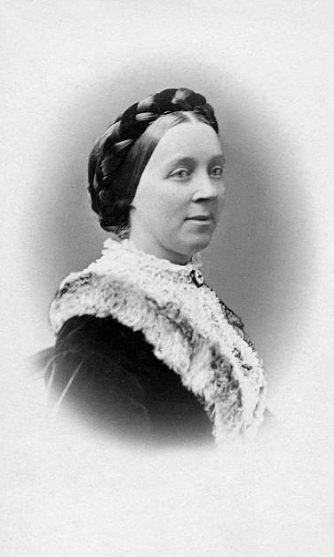
- Elisabeth in 1880

Grand Duchess consort of Oldenburg
- Tenure: 27 February 1853 – 2 February 1896
- Born: 26 March 1826; Hildburghausen, Saxe-Altenburg
- Died: 2 February 1896 (aged 69); Oldenburg, Grand Duchy of Oldenburg, German Empire
- Burial: Ducal (Herzogliches) Mausoleum, Gertrudenfriedhof, Oldenburg
- Spouse: Peter II, Grand Duke of Oldenburg (m. 1852)
- Issue: Frederick Augustus II, Grand Duke of Oldenburg; Duke Georg Ludwig of Oldenburg
Names
- Elisabeth Pauline Alexandrine
- House: Saxe-Altenburg
- Father: Joseph, Duke of Saxe-Altenburg
- Mother: Amelia of Württemberg

Princess Elisabeth Pauline Alexandrine of Saxe-Altenburg (26 March 1826 – 2 February 1896) was the daughter of Joseph, Duke of Saxe-Altenburg, and Duchess Amelia of Württemberg. By marriage, she became Grand Duchess of Oldenburg.

== Family and early life ==
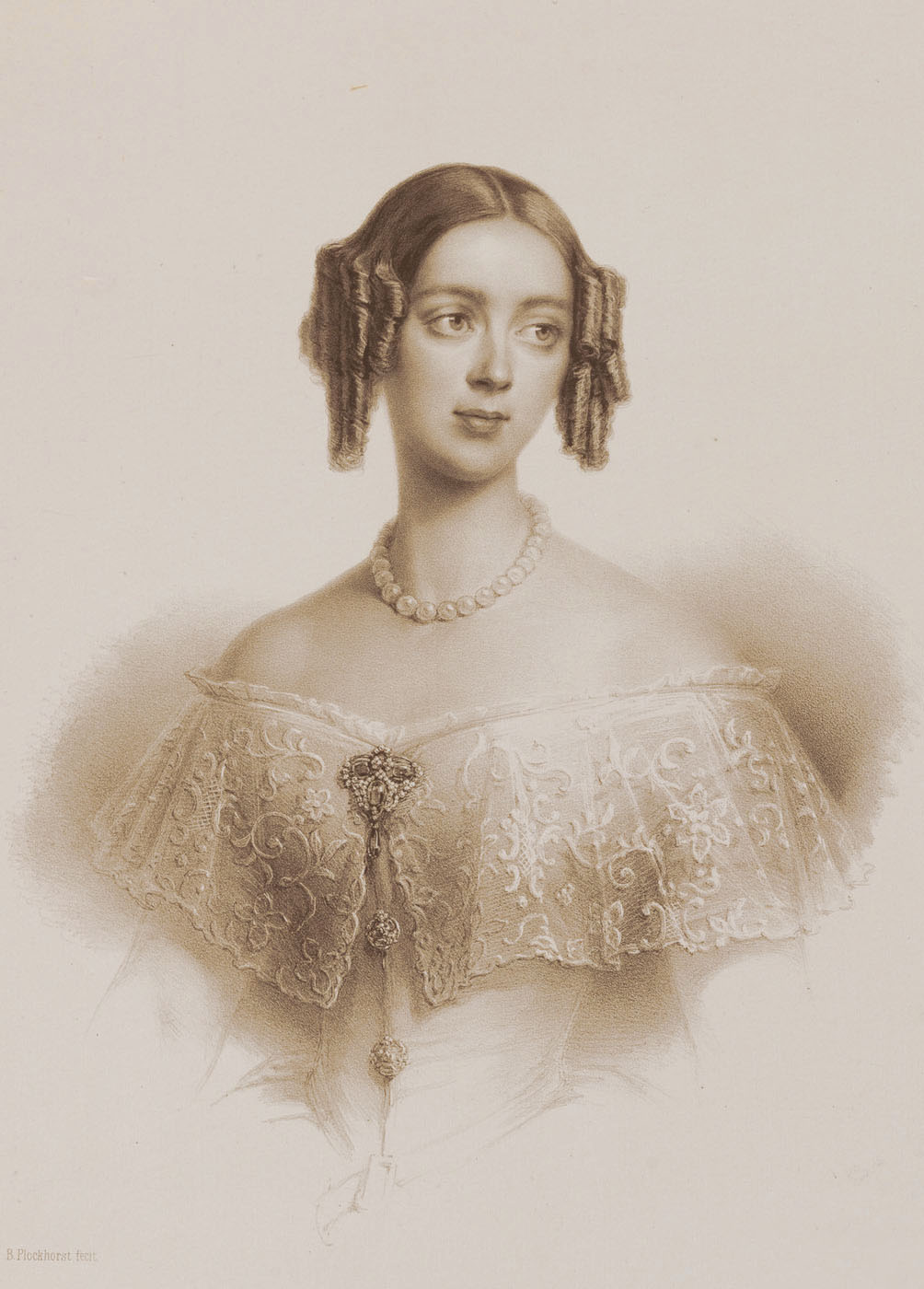
Elisabeth of Saxe-Altenburg, Grand Duchess of Oldenburg as a young woman, c. 1849

Elisabeth was born on 26 March 1826 in Hildburghausen. She was the fourth daughter born to Joseph, the then Hereditary Prince of Saxe-Hildburghausen and his wife Duchess Amelia of Württemberg. Her official title was Princess Elisabeth of Saxe-Hildburghausen until later that year, when her family moved to Altenburg as a result of a transfer of territories among the various branches of the Ernestine Wettins. Elisabeth then took the title Princess Elisabeth of Saxe-Altenburg. In 1834, her father succeeded as Duke of Saxe-Altenburg, but was forced to abdicate in the civil revolution of 1848 due to the conservative, anti-reform nature of his government.

Elisabeth and her siblings were educated by Carl Ludwig Nietzsche, a Lutheran pastor and the father of the famous philosopher Friedrich Nietzsche. Her sisters included Queen Marie of Hanover (wife of George V of Hanover) and Grand Duchess Alexandra Iosifovna of Russia (wife of Grand Duke Konstantin Nikolayevich of Russia). Through Alexandra, Elisabeth was an aunt of Queen Olga of Greece.

== Marriage ==
On 10 February 1852, Elisabeth married her second cousin Peter, Hereditary Grand Duke of Oldenburg. He would succeed his father the following year as Grand Duke, making her Grand Duchess of Oldenburg. She used funds given to her by her father on the occasion of her marriage to set up the Elisabeth Foundation, which still exists today. This fund established the Elisabeth Children's Hospital (now under the European Medical School Oldenburg-Groningen), which she oversaw, and throughout her life she was a patron of numerous charities and organizations focused on the well-being of children, sometimes supplemented by her foundation.

They had two sons:

Name	Birth	Death	Notes
Frederick Augustus II, Grand Duke of Oldenburg	16 November 1852	24 February 1931	married firstly Princess Elisabeth Anna of Prussia and secondly Duchess Elisabeth Alexandrine of Mecklenburg-Schwerin.
Duke Georg Ludwig of Oldenburg	27 June 1855	30 November 1939	

Elisabeth died on 2 February 1896. Her husband died four years later.

== Ancestry ==
Ancestors of Princess Elisabeth of Saxe-Altenburg (1826–1896)

8. Ernest Frederick III, Duke of Saxe-Hildburghausen
4. Frederick, Duke of Saxe-Altenburg
9. Princess Ernestine of Saxe-Weimar
2. Joseph, Duke of Saxe-Altenburg
10. Charles II, Grand Duke of Mecklenburg-Strelitz
5. Duchess Charlotte Georgine of Mecklenburg-Strelitz
11. Princess Friederike of Hesse-Darmstadt
1. Princess Elisabeth of Saxe-Altenburg
12. Frederick II Eugene, Duke of Württemberg
6. Duke Louis of Württemberg
13. Margravine Friederike of Brandenburg-Schwedt
3. Duchess Amelia of Württemberg
14. Charles Christian, Prince of Nassau-Weilburg
7. Princess Henriette of Nassau-Weilburg
15. Princess Carolina of Orange-Nassau

Princess Elisabeth of Saxe-Altenburg (1826–1896) House of Saxe-Altenburg Cadet branch of the House of Wettin Born: 26 March 1826 Died: 2 February 1896
German royalty
Vacant Title last held by Princess Cecilia of Sweden	Grand Duchess consort of Oldenburg; 27 February 1853 – 2 February 1896	Vacant Title next held by Duchess Elisabeth Alexandrine of Mecklenburg-Schwerin
