= County of Oldenburg =

County of the Holy Roman Empire

County of Oldenburg Grafschaft Oldenburg (German)
- 1108–1774
- Banner of arms Coat of arms

- Map of the County of Oldenburg in the Lower Rhenish–Westphalian Circle
- Capital: Oldenburg
- Government: Feudal monarchy
- Count of Oldenburg
  - 1101–1108: Elimar I (first count)
  - 1773–1774: Frederick August I (last count)
- History
  - Created on breakup of Saxony: 1108
  - Personal union with the Kalmar Union: 1448–1454
  - in personal union with Denmark: 1667–1773
  - Raised to duchy: 1774

Population
  - 1662: 62,000
  - 1702: 65,680
  - 1769: 79,071
Preceded by	Succeeded by
Duchy of Saxony; Prince-Bishopric of Münster	Duchy of Oldenburg
- Today part of: Germany

The County of Oldenburg (German: Grafschaft Oldenburg) was a county of the Holy Roman Empire. From 1667–1773, it was also part of the kingdom of Denmark.

The ruling House of Oldenburg rose to European prominence in 1448, when Count Christian ascended the throne as king of Denmark and left Oldenburg to be governed by his brothers. His descendants also include the Dukes of Holstein-Gottorp.

When the main line of the House of Oldenburg became extinct in 1667, the county passed to the Danish branch, which administered it from Copenhagen. By the Treaty of Tsarskoye Selo in 1773, Denmark transferred control of Oldenburg to Frederick August I of the Holstein-Gottorp line. Subsequently, Oldenburg was elevated to a duchy in 1774.

== History ==
=== Origins and early expansion (1108-1448) ===
The town was first mentioned in 1108, at that time known under the name of Aldenburg. It became important due to its location at a ford of the navigable Hunte river. Oldenburg became a small county in the shadow of the much more powerful Free Hanseatic City of Bremen.

The earliest recorded inhabitants of the region now called Oldenburg were a Teutonic people- the Chauci. The genealogy of the counts of Oldenburg can be traced to the Saxon hero Widukind (opponent of Charlemagne), but their first historical representative was Huno of Rustringen (died 1088, founded the monastery of Rastede in 1059). Huno's descendants appear as vassals of the dukes of Saxony and were occasionally rebellious. They were given the title of princes of the Empire when the emperor Frederick I dismembered the Saxon duchy in 1189. At this time the county of Delmenhorst formed part of the dominions of the counts of Oldenburg, but afterwards it was on several occasions separated from them to form an appanage for younger branches of the family, namely in ca. 1266-1436, 1463-1547, and 1577-1617.

The northern and western parts of what would become the Grand Duchy of Oldenburg were in the hands of independent, or semi-independent, Frisian princes, who were usually pagan, and the counts of Oldenburg seized much of these lands in a series of wars during the early part of the 13th century. The Free Hanseatic City of Bremen and the bishop of Münster also frequently warred with the counts of Oldenburg.

=== Personal Union with Denmark (1448-1460) ===
In 1448, the 31-year-old King of Denmark, Christopher III, died unexpectedly and without heirs. Owing to the Kalmar Union, he had also been King of Norway and Sweden. The union treaty required the three kingdoms to choose a successor jointly, but tensions between Denmark and Sweden precluded negotiations. When the Swedish Privy Council allowed Karl Knutsson to be crowned King of Sweden, the Danish Privy Council sought an alternative candidate. Their first choice, Duke Adolf VIII of Schleswig and Holstein, declined but recommended his nephew Christian, the young Count of Oldenburg, who had been raised at his court.

Following Adolf’s recommendation, the Danish Privy Council elected Christian king in September 1448. In 1449 he was also elected King of Norway, and the two kingdoms were formally united in 1450 with the Treaty of Bergen. Finally, after the deposition of Karl Knutsson in 1457, Christian also gained the Swedish crown.

During Christian’s early reign, Oldenburg became a Danish exclave. For centuries thereafter, Oldenburg and its rulers would be more closely aligned with Denmark and its foreign policy than with imperial structures or the Holy Roman Emperors. In Christian’s absence, effective control over the town was left to his brothers, Gerhard and Moritz, who established a short-lived tyranny.

=== Independent County (1460-1667) ===
In 1459, King Christian stood to inherit the Duchy of Schleswig and the County of Holstein from his uncle, Adolf VIII—a development that significantly shaped Oldenburg’s future. To prevent the separation of the two territories, the nobles of Holstein and Schleswig invited Christian to rule as Duke of Schleswig and Count of Holstein. In return, Christian granted the nobles extensive privileges in the Treaty of Ribe. He also agreed to renounce his hereditary claim to Oldenburg.

Christian transferred Oldenburg to his brother Gerhard, thereby giving Oldenburg independence from the Danish crown. Gerhard waged continual conflicts with the Bishop of Bremen and other neighbors, earning himself a reputation as a pirate in the eyes of the Hanseatic League. In 1483, however, Gerhard was compelled to abdicate in favor of his son, and he later died while on a pilgrimage in Spain.

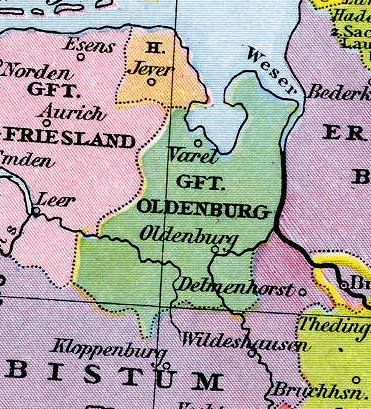
The County of Oldenburg in the 15th century

Early in the 16th century, Oldenburg was again enlarged at the expense of the Frisians. Protestantism was introduced into the county by Count Anton I (1505–1573), who also suppressed the monasteries. However, he remained loyal to Charles V during the war of the League of Schmalkalden, and was able thus to increase his territories, obtaining Delmenhorst in 1547. One of Anton's brothers, Count Christopher of Oldenburg (c. 1506-1560) also won a reputation as a soldier.

Anton's grandson, Anton Günther (1583–1667), who succeeded in 1603 significantly enlarged and enriched his territories. He thus considered himself the wisest prince who ever had ruled Oldenburg. Jever had been acquired before his ascension, but in 1624 he added Knipphausen and Varel to his lands; thus, in 1647 Delmenhorst was finally united. Through neutrality during the Thirty Years' War and by donating valuable horses to warlord Count of Tilly, Anton Günther protected his dominions from the devastation levied on nearly all other German states. He also obtained from the emperor the right to levy tolls on vessels passing along the Weser, a lucrative grant. In 1607 he erected a Renaissance castle. Oldenburg was a wealthy town in a time of war and turmoil and its population and power grew considerably.

=== Danish Oldenburg (1667-1773) ===
Anton Günther, having no legitimate children to keep the main line of his House from going extinct, arranged an agreement with the prospective successors of the county, King Frederick III of Denmark and Duke Christian Albrecht of Holstein-Gottorp. It was decided that Oldenburg would pass jointly to them, while Günther’s illegitimate but ennobled son, Anton von Aldenburg, would serve as governor on their behalf. Upon Günther’s death in 1667, Anton von Aldenburg assumed control of the county, but internal conflicts within the House of Holstein-Gottorp allowed only the Danish crown to assert its inheritance rights effectively. After von Aldenburg’s death in 1680, Danish officials occupied the residence in Oldenburg, formally integrating the county into Denmark’s administrative system under the authority of the German Chancellery in Copenhagen.

The period of Danish rule was marked by repeated crises. Two plague outbreaks in 1667 and 1668 decimated the population and weakened the economy, while in 1676 a fire caused by lightning destroyed 700 houses and left 3,000 people homeless. Von Aldenburg’s financial aid did little to accelerate recovery, which was further impeded by the Scanian War. Danish troops were quartered in Oldenburg and financed partly through local taxation, while their competition for work depressed wages in the town. Following von Aldenburg’s death, reforms were introduced by Chancellor Christoph Gensch von Breitenau (1681–1701) to modernize local administration and stabilize the economy. Despite these measures, Oldenburg remained a strategic rather than economic asset for Denmark, serving as a military quarter during the Great Northern War and the Seven Years’ War at considerable cost to the population.

Weak finances also hampered dyke maintenance in the low-lying areas of the county. The Christmas Flood of 1717 killed more than 4,000 people in Oldenburg and left large tracts of land uncultivable, while the New Year’s Flood of 1720 destroyed many of the emergency dykes erected in the aftermath. King Frederick IV, who had initiated coastal protection measures in 1714, expanded these efforts after 1717 by granting loans for improved dyke construction. Reconstruction was carried out under the supervision of former admiral Christian Thomesen Sehested and included the rebuilding of parts of Oldenburg town. Only in the mid-18th century did the county’s economy recover sufficiently to yield a net fiscal benefit to the Danish treasury.

=== Independence and elevation to duchy (1773-1774) ===
In the 1770s, Oldenburg suddenly stood at the center of European diplomacy. Back in 1544, king Christian III of Denmark, from the House of Oldenburg, divided the rule over Schleswig and Holstein with his brothers Johann and Adolf. From Adolf’s branch came the Dukes of Schleswig-Holstein-Gottorf, who also ruled the Prince-Bishopric of Lübeck.

During the Great Northern War, Georg Heinrich von Görtz governed Schleswig and Holstein in the name of the young Duke Karl Friedrich of Gottorf. Seeking to strengthen his position, he allied with Sweden against Denmark. In response, the Danish king annexed parts of Schleswig in 1713.

Karl Friedrich, weakened by this loss, turned to Russia for support. In 1725 he married Anna, daughter of Tsar Peter I. Their son later became Tsar Peter III in 1762. From the Russian throne he pressed his family’s claims to Schleswig and threatened Denmark with war. But after Peter III’s sudden death only six months later, his widow, Catherine II, looked for a diplomatic solution.

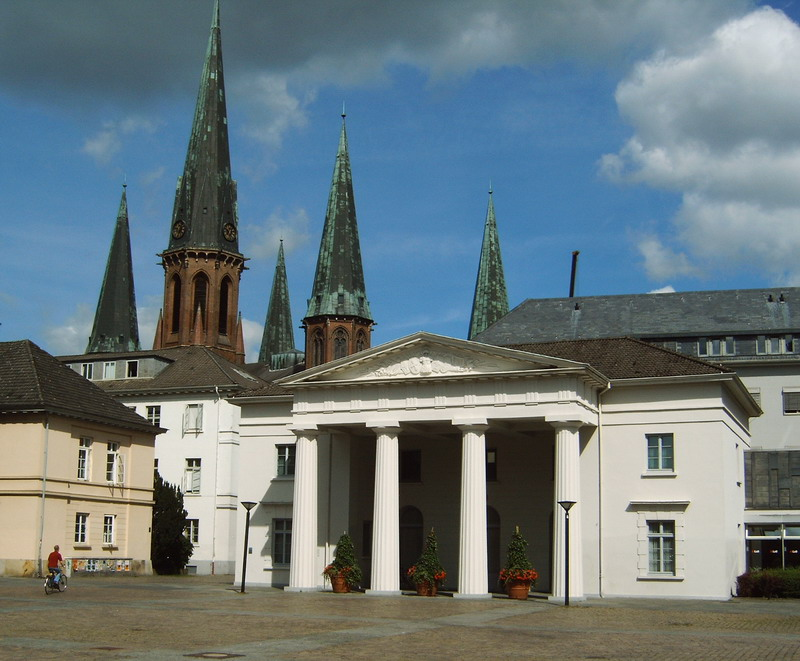
Guard house and the Lamberti-Church

This was achieved in 1773 with the Treaty of Tsarskoye Selo: Denmark received Schleswig and Holstein, while Oldenburg was transferred to Catherine’s son Paul. He soon passed it on to his great-uncle, Friedrich August, Prince-Bishop of Lübeck. From that point, Friedrich August ruled Oldenburg as an independent territory, first as Count and, from 1774, as Duke. For Denmark, which was losing its status as a major European power, keeping the small and economically weak Oldenburg was less important than securing its southern border with Schleswig and avoiding conflict with Russia. For the newly independent Oldenburg, dynastic connections to Denmark gradually mattered less, while relationships with the Russian dynasty—and later political ties with Prussia—became increasingly important.

During the reign of Friedrich August, Oldenburg regained its importance as a dynastic residence. Following the destruction of earlier structures, the city was reshaped with new buildings in the Classical style.

== Rulers ==
=== House of Oldenburg ===
==== Partitions of Oldenburg under House of Oldenburg rule ====
Schleswig and Holstein under House of Schauenburg rule (1106-1433)
County of Wildeshausen (1142-1388)
County of Oldenburg (1093-1667)	County of Delmenhorst (1st creation) (1270-1436)
Annexed to the County of Hoya
Duchy of Schleswig and Holstein (1433-1533)
Duchy of Schleswig (1533-1864)	Duchy of Holstein (1533-1773)
Lordship of Sonderburg (1559-1709)
County of Delmenhorst (2nd creation) (1573-1647)	Lordship of Norburg (1622-1706)	Lordship of Glücksburg (1622-1779)
Lordship of Wiesenburg (1627-1725)	Lordship of Beck (1627-1745)	Lordship of Augustenburg (1622-1869)
Duchy of Schleswig (1533-1864)	Lordship of Plon (1622-1761)
Sold to Poland	Sold to the Wulffen family
Duchy of Oldenburg (Holstein line) (1774-1815) Raised to: Grand Duchy of Oldenburg (1815-1918)	to Schleswig
Lordship of Glücksburg (Beck line) (1825-1918)
Annexed to Germany	Annexed to Germany	Annexed to Germany
Annexed to Denmark
Annexed to Germany

==== Table of rulers ====
Ruler	Born	Reign	Ruling part	Consort	Death	Notes
Elimar I	c.1060	1088 – 1108	County of Oldenburg	Richenza three children	c.1112 aged 51-52	Founder of the family and the county. Abdicated to his son.
Elimar II	c.1080 Son of Elimar I and Richenza	1108 – 1142	County of Oldenburg	Eilika of Werl-Rietberg c.1100 four children	1142 aged 61-62	
Henry I	1122; First son of Elimar II and Eilika of Werl-Rietberg	1142 – 1167	County of Wildeshausen	Salome of Guelders c.1135 five children	1167; Wildeshausen aged 44-45	Children of Elimar II, divided their inheritance. The sisters' inheritance went to their respective husbands.
Christian I the Quarrelsome	1123; Second son of Elimar II and Eilika of Werl-Rietberg	1142 – 1167	County of Oldenburg	Kunigunde of Versfleht c.1140 two children	1167; Oldenburg aged 43-44	Children of Elimar II, divided their inheritance. The sisters' inheritance went to their respective husbands.
Beatrice	1124; First daughter of Elimar II and Eilika of Werl-Rietberg	1142 – 1184	County of Oldenburg (at Elmendorf)	Frederick of Ampfurt c.1150 at least one child	1184 aged 59-60	Children of Elimar II, divided their inheritance. The sisters' inheritance went to their respective husbands.
Eilika	1126; Second daughter of Elimar II and Eilika of Werl-Rietberg	1142 – 28 February 1189	County of Oldenburg (at Osnabruck)	Henry I, Count of Tecklenburg c.1140 one child	28 February 1189 aged 62-63	Children of Elimar II, divided their inheritance. The sisters' inheritance went to their respective husbands.
Henry II	c.1140 Son of Henry I and Salome of Guelders	1167 – 1197	County of Wildeshausen	Beatrice of Hallermund c.1170 four children	1197; Caesarea aged 56-57	
Regency of Henry, Duke of Saxony (1167-1180)						
Maurice I	1150; Son of Christian I and Kunigunde of Versfleht	1167 – 1209	County of Oldenburg	Salome of Wickrath c.1170 five children	1209 aged 58-59	
Henry III	c.1180 First son of Henry II and Beatrice of Hallermund	1197 – 27 May 1234	County of Wildeshausen	Ermtrud of Schoten-Breda c.1190 four children	27 May 1234 near Altenesch aged 53-54	Children of Henry II, divided their inheritance.
Burchard	c.1180 Second son of Henry II and Beatrice of Hallermund	1197 – 6 July 1233	County of Wildeshausen (at Ferchta)	Kunigunde of Schoten-Breda c.1190 three children	6 July 1233; Hemmelskamp aged 53-54	Children of Henry II, divided their inheritance.
Otto I	c.1170 First son of Maurice I and Salome of Wickrath	1209 – 1251	County of Oldenburg	Matilda of Woldenberg two children	1251 aged 80-81~	Children of Christian I, ruled jointly.
Christian II	c.1170 Second son of Maurice I and Salome of Wickrath	1209 – 1233	County of Oldenburg	Agnes of Altena-Isenberg c.1200 two children	1233 aged 62-63	Children of Christian I, ruled jointly.
Henry IV of Bogen	c.1210 Son of Burchard and Kunigunde of Schoten-Breda	6 July 1233 – 1271	County of Wildeshausen (at Ferchta)	Elisabeth of Tecklenburg c.1220 one child	1271; Palestine aged 60-61	After his death with no male descendants, his part of Wildeshausen was reunited with the other one.
Henry V	c.1220 First son of Henry III and Ermtrud of Schoten-Breda	27 May 1234 – 1270	County of Wildeshausen (with Younger Bruchhausen)	Irmgard of Hoya c.1250 no children	1270; Wildeshausen aged 49-50	Children of Henry III, divided their inheritance.
Ludolf	c.1220 Second son of Henry III and Ermtrud of Schoten-Breda	27 May 1234 – 24 July 1278	County of Wildeshausen (at Elder Bruchhausen)	Hedwig of Wölpe two children	1278 aged 57-58	Children of Henry III, divided their inheritance.
John I	1204; Son of Christian II and Agnes of Altena-Isenberg	1251 – 1272	County of Oldenburg	Richeza of Hoya-Stumpenhausen c.1240 four children	1272; Oldenburg aged 67-68	Co-ruling with his uncle Otto since 1233.
Gerhard I	c.1250 Son of Henry V and Irmgard of Hoya	1270 – 1310	County of Wildeshausen (with Younger Bruchhausen)	Gisela c.1280? one child	1310 aged 59-60	
Christian III	c.1240 First son of John I and Richeza of Hoya-Stumpenhausen	1272 – 1285	County of Oldenburg	Judith of Bentheim c.1270 three children	1285; Oldenburg aged 44-45	Children of John I, divided their inheritance.
Otto I	c.1240 Second son of John I and Richeza of Hoya-Stumpenhausen	1272 – 2 February 1304	County of Delmenhorst	Oda of Waldeck-Sternberg (d.30 May 1291) c.1270 seven children	2 February 1304 aged 63-64	Children of John I, divided their inheritance.
Hildebald	c.1240 Son of Ludolf and Hedwig of Wölpe	24 July 1278 – 8 September 1310	County of Wildeshausen (at Elder Bruchhausen)	Sophia of Ravensberg three children	8 September 1310 aged 69-70	
Regency of Otto I, Count of Delmehorst (1285-1289)						
John II	c.1275 Son of Christian III and Judith of Bentheim	1285 – 1316	County of Oldenburg	Elisabeth of Brunswick-Lüneburg (d.1298); 1294>br>two children Hedwig of Diepholz c.1298 five children	1316 aged 40-41	
John I	c.1280 First son of Otto I and Oda of Waldeck-Sternberg	2 February 1304 – 1 July 1348	County of Delmenhorst	Kunigunde of Wölpe (d.1335) c.1300 nine children	1 July 1348 aged 67-68	Children of Otto I, ruled jointly.
Christian I the Elder	c.1280 Second son of Otto I and Oda of Waldeck-Sternberg	2 February 1304 – 18 January 1355	County of Delmenhorst	Liutgard of Bronckhorst; 1315 no children Elisabeth of Rostock; February 1317 five children	18 January 1355 aged 74-75	Children of Otto I, ruled jointly.
Otto	c.1280 Son of Hildebald and Sophia of Ravensberg	8 September 1310 – 1335	County of Wildeshausen (at Elder Bruchhausen)	Oda no children	September 1360 aged 79-80	Abdicated to his relatives, the Counts of Hoya.
Elder Bruchhausen annexed to the County of Hoya
Henry VI	c.1280 Son of Gerhard I and Gisela	1310 – 14 October 1362	County of Wildeshausen (with Younger Bruchhausen)	Lysa c.1310? three children	14 October 1362 aged 81-82	
Christian IV	c.1295 First son of John II and Elisabeth of Brunswick-Lüneburg	1316 – 1323	County of Oldenburg	Hedwig of Wildenhausen-Elder Bruchhausen one child	1323 aged 27-28	Children of John II, ruled jointly.
John III	c.1295 Second son of John II and Elisabeth of Brunswick-Lüneburg	1316 – 1342	County of Oldenburg	Matilda of Bronckhorst c.1330 four children	1342 aged 46-47	Children of John II, ruled jointly.
Conrad I	c.1300 Oldenburg; Son of John II and Hedwig of Diepholz	1324 – 1347	County of Oldenburg	Ingeborg of Holstein-Plön (1316-c.1350) c.1330 four children	1347 aged 46-47	Children of John II, ruled jointly.
John IV	c.1330 Son of John III and Matilda of Bronckhorst	1347 – 1356	County of Oldenburg	Unmarried	1356 aged 25-26	Cousins, ruled jointly.
Conrad II	c.1330 First son of Conrad I and Ingeborg of Holstein-Plön	1347 – 1401	County of Oldenburg	Kunigunde of Diepholz c.1360 four children	1401 aged 70-71	Cousins, ruled jointly.
Christian V	c.1330 Second son of Conrad I and Ingeborg of Holstein-Plön	1347 – 6 April 1399	County of Oldenburg	Agnes of Hohnstein (1360-1 September 1404); 1377 two children	6 April 1399 aged 68-69	Cousins, ruled jointly.
Christian II the Younger	c.1320 Son of John I and Kunigunde of Wölpe	18 January 1355 – 1367	County of Delmenhorst	Heilwig of Hoya c.1360 nine children	1367 aged 66-67	Cousins, ruled jointly.
Otto II	c.1320 Son of Otto I and Oda of Waldeck-Sternberg	18 January 1355 – 1374	County of Delmenhorst	Liutgard of Bronckhorst; 1315 no children Elisabeth of Rostock; February 1317 five children	1374 aged 53-54	Cousins, ruled jointly.
Gerhard II	c.1310 Son of Henry VI and Lysa	14 October 1362 – 1 July 1384	County of Wildeshausen (with Younger Bruchhausen)	Unmarried	28 May 1388 aged 77-78	In 13844, he sold his patrimony to his relatives, the Counts of Hoya.
Wildeshausen and Younger Bruchhausen annexed to the County of Hoya
Regency of Heilwig of Hoya (1374-1380)						Nephew of Otto II.
Otto III	c.1367 Son of Christian II and Heilwig of Hoya	1374 – 22 July 1418	County of Delmenhorst	Richarda of Tecklenburg c.1390 two children	22 July 1418 aged 50-51	Nephew of Otto II.
Maurice II	c.1360 Son of Conrad II and Kunigunde of Diepholz	1401 – 2 October 1420	County of Oldenburg	Elisabeth of Brunswick-Wolfenbüttel; 5 March 1399 three children	2 October 1420 aged 59-60	Cousins, ruled jointly.
Christian VI	c.1380 First son of Christian V and Agnes of Hohnstein	1401 – 1421	County of Oldenburg	Unmarried	1423 aged 40-41	Cousins, ruled jointly.
Dietrich the Fortunate	c.1380 Second son of Christian V and Agnes of Hohnstein	1401 – 14 February 1440	County of Oldenburg	Adelaide of Delmenhorst (d.1404) c.1400 no children Heilwig of Holstein-Rendsburg; 23 November 1423 four children	14 February 1440 aged 41-42	Cousins, ruled jointly.
Nicholas	c.1390 Son of Otto III and Richarda of Tecklenburg	22 July 1418 – 1436	County of Delmenhorst	Unmarried	8 December 1447; Delmenhorst aged 56-57	In 1420, transferred the County to the Archbishopric of Bremen, but continued to rule it until 1436, when he made a new transfer to the County of Oldenburg
Delmenhorst annexed to County of Oldenburg
Christian VII & I	February 1426; Oldenburg; Son of Dietrich and Hedvig of Holstein	14 February 1440 – 1448	County of Oldenburg	Dorothea of Brandenburg; 28 October 1449; Copenhagen five children	21 May 1481; Copenhagen Castle aged 55	Children of Dietrich, divided their inheritance. In 1448, Christian abdicated to inherit Denmark and, in 1460, also received, from his uncles from Holstein, the Duchy of Schleswig-Holstein.
Christian VII & I	February 1426; Oldenburg; Son of Dietrich and Hedvig of Holstein	5 March 1460 – 21 May 1481	Duchy of Schleswig-Holstein	Dorothea of Brandenburg; 28 October 1449; Copenhagen five children	21 May 1481; Copenhagen Castle aged 55	Children of Dietrich, divided their inheritance. In 1448, Christian abdicated to inherit Denmark and, in 1460, also received, from his uncles from Holstein, the Duchy of Schleswig-Holstein.
Maurice III	c.1425 Second son of Dietrich and Heilwig of Holstein-Rendsburg	14 February 1440 – 9 August 1464	County of Delmenhorst	Catharina of Hoya (d.1465); 22 February 1458 four children	14 February 1440 aged 41-42	Children of Dietrich, divided their inheritance. In 1448, Christian abdicated to inherit Denmark and, in 1460, also received, from his uncles from Holstein, the Duchy of Schleswig-Holstein.
Gerhard the Brave	c.1430 Third son of Dietrich and Heilwig of Holstein-Rendsburg	14 February 1440 – January 1482	County of Oldenburg	Adelaide of Tecklenburg (1435-2 March 1477); 1453 eleven children	22 February 1500 aged 69-70	Children of Dietrich, divided their inheritance. In 1448, Christian abdicated to inherit Denmark and, in 1460, also received, from his uncles from Holstein, the Duchy of Schleswig-Holstein.
Regency of Gerhard, Count of Oldenburg (1464-1482)						As a child, he was under influence of his uncle from Oldenburg. Sought support from the King of Denmark against the Archbishop of Bremen, who besieged his domains. Intended to travel to France, Jacob dedicated the rest of his life to piracy.
Jacob	24 August 1463; Son of Maurice III and Catharina of Hoya	9 August 1464 – 1484	County of Delmenhorst	Unmarried	June-September 1484 aged 20-21	As a child, he was under influence of his uncle from Oldenburg. Sought support from the King of Denmark against the Archbishop of Bremen, who besieged his domains. Intended to travel to France, Jacob dedicated the rest of his life to piracy.
Delmenhorst annexed to the County of Oldenburg
John I	2 February 1455; Aalborghus Castle; First son of Christian I and Dorothea of Brandenburg	21 May 1481 – 20 February 1513	Duchy of Schleswig-Holstein	Christina of Saxony; 6 September 1478; Copenhagen five children	20 February 1513; Aalborghus Castle aged 58	Children of Christian I, ruled jointly. Frederick associated his nephew Christian II to his rulership, but Christian ended up deposed and imprisoned.
Frederick I	7 October 1471; Haderslevhus Castle; Second son of Christian I and Dorothea of Brandenburg	21 May 1481 – 10 April 1533	Duchy of Schleswig-Holstein	Anna of Brandenburg; 10 April 1502; Stendal two children Sophie of Pomerania; 9 October 1518; Kiel Castle six children	10 April 1533; Gottorp Castle aged 61	Children of Christian I, ruled jointly. Frederick associated his nephew Christian II to his rulership, but Christian ended up deposed and imprisoned.
Christian II the Tyrant	1 July 1481; Nyborg Castle; Son of John and Christina of Saxony	22 July 1513 – 20 January 1523	Duchy of Schleswig-Holstein	Isabella of Austria; 12 August 1515; Copenhagen six children	25 January 1559; Kalundborg Castle aged 77	Children of Christian I, ruled jointly. Frederick associated his nephew Christian II to his rulership, but Christian ended up deposed and imprisoned.
Adolph	c.1460 Oldenburg; First son of Gerhard and Adelaide of Tecklenburg	January 1482 – 17 February 1500	County of Oldenburg (at Delmenhorst)	Unmarried	22 February 1500 aged 39-40	Children of Gerhard, divided the inheritance, but it was quickly reunited.
John V	1460; Oldenburg; Second son of Gerhard and Adelaide of Tecklenburg	January 1482 – 10 February 1526	County of Oldenburg (at Oldenburg proper)	Anna of Anhalt-Zerbst (d.1531); 1498 five children	10 February 1526; Oldenburg aged 65-66	Children of Gerhard, divided the inheritance, but it was quickly reunited.
John VI	21 July 1500; Oldenburg; First son of John V and Anna of Anhalt-Zerbst	10 February 1526 – 1529	County of Oldenburg	Unmarried	16 January 1548; Bremen aged 47	Children of Gerhard, ruled jointly, but John VI and George were expelled from the co-regency in 1529.
George	1503; Oldenburg; Second son of John V and Anna of Anhalt-Zerbst	10 February 1526 – 1529	County of Oldenburg	Unmarried	2 January 1551; Oldenburg aged 47-48	Children of Gerhard, ruled jointly, but John VI and George were expelled from the co-regency in 1529.
Christopher	1504; Oldenburg; Third son of John V and Anna of Anhalt-Zerbst	10 February 1526 – 4 August 1566	County of Oldenburg	Unmarried	4 August 1566; Oldenburg aged 61-62	Children of Gerhard, ruled jointly, but John VI and George were expelled from the co-regency in 1529.
Anton I	1505; Oldenburg; Fourth son of John V and Anna of Anhalt-Zerbst	10 February 1526 – 22 January 1573	County of Oldenburg	Sophia of Saxe-Lauenburg; 1 January 1537; Oldenburg six children	22 January 1573; Oldenburg aged 68-69	Children of Gerhard, ruled jointly, but John VI and George were expelled from the co-regency in 1529.
Christian III	12 August 1503; Gottorp Castle; Son of Frederick I and Anna of Brandenburg	10 April 1533 – 1 January 1559	Duchy of Schleswig	Dorothea of Saxe-Lauenburg; 29 October 1525; Lauenburg Castle five children	1 January 1559; Koldinghus Castle aged 55	Children of Frederick I, divided their inheritance.
John II the Elder	21 June 1521; Haderslevhus Castle; First son of Frederick I and Sophie of Pomerania	10 April 1533 – 1 October 1580	Duchy of Holstein (at Haderslev)	Unmarried	1 October 1580; Hansborg Castle aged 59	Children of Frederick I, divided their inheritance.
Adolph	25 January 1526; Duborg Castle; Second son of Frederick I and Sophie of Pomerania	10 April 1533 – 1 January 1559	Duchy of Holstein (at Gottorp)	Christine of Hesse; 17 December 1564; Gottorp Castle ten children	1 October 1586; Gottorp Castle aged 60	Children of Frederick I, divided their inheritance.
Frederick II	1 July 1534; Haderslevhus Castle; First son of Christian III and Dorothea of Saxe-Lauenburg	1 January 1559 – 4 April 1588	Duchy of Schleswig	Sophie of Mecklenburg-Güstrow; 20 July 1572; Copenhagen eight children	4 April 1588; Antvorskov Castle aged 53	Children of Christian III, divided their inheritance.
John II the Younger	25 March 1545; Koldinghus Castle; Second son of Christian III and Dorothea of Saxe-Lauenburg	1 January 1559 – 9 October 1622	Lordship of Sonderburg	Elisabeth of Brunswick-Grubenhagen; 19 August 1568; Kolding fourteen children Elisabeth of Brunswick-Grubenhagen; 14 February 1588 nine children	9 October 1622; Glücksburg aged 77	Children of Christian III, divided their inheritance.
John VII the Dike Builder	9 September 1540; Oldenburg; First son of Anton I and Sophia of Saxe-Lauenburg	22 January 1573 – 12 November 1603	County of Oldenburg	Elisabeth of Schwarzburg-Arnstadt; 29 July 1576; Delmenhorst six children	12 November 1603; Oldenburg aged 63	Children of Anton I, divided their inheritance.
Anton II	8 September 1550; Oldenburg; Second son of Anton I and Sophia of Saxe-Lauenburg	22 January 1573 – 25 October 1619	County of Delmenhorst	Sibylla Elisabeth of Brunswick-Dannenberg; 1600 eleven children	25 October 1619; Delmenhorst aged 69	Children of Anton I, divided their inheritance.
Frederick II	21 April 1568; Gottorp Castle; First son of Adolph and Christine of Hesse	1 October 1586 – 15 June 1587	Duchy of Holstein	Unmarried	15 June 1587; Gottorp Castle aged 19	Died without descendants. He was succeeded by his brother.
Philip	10 August 1570; Gottorp Castle; Second son of Adolph and Christine of Hesse	15 June 1587 – 18 October 1590	Duchy of Holstein	Unmarried	18 October 1590; Gottorp aged 20	Died without descendants. He was succeeded by his brother.
Regency of Sophie of Mecklenburg-Güstrow (1588-1594)						
Christian IV	12 April 1577; Frederiksborg Palace; Son of Frederick II and Sophie of Mecklenburg-Güstrow	4 April 1588 – 28 February 1648	Duchy of Schleswig	Anne Catherine of Brandenburg; 27 November 1597; Haderslevhus Castle seven children Kirsten Munk; 31 December 1615; Copenhagen twelve children	28 February 1648; Rosenborg Castle aged 70	
John Adolph	27 February 1575; Gottorp Castle; Third son of Adolph and Christine of Hesse	18 October 1590 – 31 March 1616	Duchy of Holstein	Augusta of Denmark; 30 August 1596; Copenhagen eight children	31 March 1616; Schleswig aged 41	
Anton Günther	10 November 1583; Oldenburg; Son of John VII and Elisabeth of Schwarzburg-Arnstadt	12 November 1603 – 19 June 1667	County of Oldenburg	Sophia Catharina of Sonderburg; 31 May 1635; Oldenburg no children	19 June 1667; Rastede aged 83	Children of John VII, divided their inheritance. After Anton's death with no descendants, Oldenburg was annexed to Schleswig.
Magdalena	6 October 1585; Oldenburg; Daughter of John VII and Elisabeth of Schwarzburg-Arnstadt	12 November 1603 – 14 April 1657	County of Oldenburg (at Jever)	Rudolph, Prince of Anhalt-Zerbst; 31 August 1612; Oldenburg two children	14 April 1657; Coswig aged 71	Children of John VII, divided their inheritance. After Anton's death with no descendants, Oldenburg was annexed to Schleswig.
Oldenburg annexed to Schleswig; Jever re-merged in Oldenburg (1657-1667), and was then inherited by Anhalt
Frederick III	22 December 1597; Gottorp Castle; Son of John Adolph and Augusta of Denmark	31 March 1616 – 10 August 1659	Duchy of Holstein	Marie Elisabeth of Saxony; 21 February 1630; Dresden sixteen children	10 August 1659; Tönning aged 61	
Regency of Sibylla Elisabeth of Brunswick-Dannenberg (1619-1630)						Left no descendants. The county was re-annexed to Oldenburg.
Christian	26 September 1612; Delmenhorst; Son of Anton II and Sibylla Elisabeth of Brunswick-Dannenberg	25 October 1619 – 23 May 1647	County of Delmenhorst	Unmarried	23 May 1647; Delmenhorst aged 34	Left no descendants. The county was re-annexed to Oldenburg.
Delmenhorst merged again in Oldenburg
Alexander	20 January 1573; Sønderborg; First son of John II and Elisabeth of Brunswick-Grubenhagen	9 October 1622 – 13 May 1627	Lordship of Sonderburg	Dorothea of Schwarzburg-Sondershausen; 26 November 1604; Oldenburg eleven children	13 May 1627; Sønderborg aged 54	Children of John II, divided their inheritance.
John Adolph	15 September 1576; Sønderborg Castle; Second son of John II and Elisabeth of Brunswick-Grubenhagen	9 October 1622 – 21 February 1624	Lordship of Norburg	Unmarried	21 February 1624; Nordborg Castle aged 47	Children of John II, divided their inheritance.
Philip	15 March 1584; Sønderborg Castle; Fourth son of John II and Elisabeth of Brunswick-Grubenhagen	9 October 1622 – 27 September 1663	Lordship of Glücksburg	Sophia Hedwig of Saxe-Lauenburg; 23 May 1624 near Boizenburg fourteen children	27 September 1663; Glücksburg Castle aged 79	Children of John II, divided their inheritance.
Joachim Ernest	29 August 1595; Sønderborg Castle; Son of John II and Agnes Hedwig of Anhalt	9 October 1622 – 5 October 1671	Lordship of Plön	Dorothea Augusta of Holstein; 12 May 1633 nine children	5 October 1671; Plön aged 76	Children of John II, divided their inheritance.
Frederick	26 November 1581; Sønderborg Castle; Third son of John II and Elisabeth of Brunswick-Grubenhagen	21 February 1624 – 22 July 1658	Lordship of Norburg	Juliana of Saxe-Lauenburg; 1 August 1627 one child Eleanor of Anhalt-Zerbst; 5 February 1632; Nordborg five children	22 July 1658; Nordborg Castle aged 76	Younger brother of John Adolph, succeeded him in Norburg.
John Christian	26 April 1607; Beck; First son of Alexander and Dorothea of Schwarzburg-Sondershausen	13 May 1627 – 30 June 1653	Lordship of Sonderburg	Anna of Oldenburg-Delmenhorst; 4 November 1634; Oldenburg four children	30 June 1653; Sønderborg aged 46	Children of Alexander, divided their inheritance. In 1646, Sophia Catharina received her share on her marriage, and sold it to her brother, August Philip, some years later.
Ernest Günther I	14 January 1609; Beck; Second son of Alexander and Dorothea of Schwarzburg-Sondershausen	13 May 1627 – 18 January 1689	Lordship of Augustenburg	Augusta of Sonderburg-Glücksburg; 15 June 1651; Copenhagen ten children	18 January 1689; Augustenborg Palace aged 79	Children of Alexander, divided their inheritance. In 1646, Sophia Catharina received her share on her marriage, and sold it to her brother, August Philip, some years later.
Philip Louis	27 October 1620; Beck; Fourth son of Alexander and Dorothea of Schwarzburg-Sondershausen	13 May 1627 – 10 March 1689	Lordship of Wiesenburg	Catherine of Waldeck-Wildungen; 15 November 1643; Lemgo two children Anna Margaret of Hesse-Homburg; 5 May 1660; Bad Homburg fifteen children Christina Magdalena Reuss of Upper Greiz; 28 July 1668; Greiz no children	10 March 1689; Schneeberg aged 68	Children of Alexander, divided their inheritance. In 1646, Sophia Catharina received her share on her marriage, and sold it to her brother, August Philip, some years later.
Sophia Catharina	28 June 1617; Beck; Daughter of Alexander and Dorothea of Schwarzburg-Sondershausen	31 May 1635 – 1646	Lordship of Beck	Anthony Günther, Count of Oldenburg; 31 May 1635; Oldenburg no children	22 November 1696; Oldenburg aged 79	Children of Alexander, divided their inheritance. In 1646, Sophia Catharina received her share on her marriage, and sold it to her brother, August Philip, some years later.
Augustus Philip	11 November 1612; Sønderborg; Third son of Alexander and Dorothea of Schwarzburg-Sondershausen	1646 – 6 May 1675	Lordship of Beck	Clara of Oldenburg-Delmenhorst (19 April 1606 – 19 January 1647); 15 January 1645; Delmenhorst no children Sidonia of Oldenburg-Delmenhorst (10 June 1611 – April 1650); June 1649; Delmenhorst one child Maria Sibylla of Nassau-Saarbrücken; 12 April 1651 eleven children	6 May 1675; Beck aged 46	
Frederick III	18 March 1609; Haderslevhus Castle; Son of Christian IV and Anne Catherine of Brandenburg	6 July 1648 – 9 February 1670	Duchy of Schleswig	Sophie Amalie of Brunswick-Lüneburg; 1 October 1643; Glücksburg Castle eight children	9 February 1670; Copenhagen Castle aged 60	
Christian Adolph I	3 January 1641; Sønderborg; Son of John Christian and Anna of Oldenburg-Delmenhorst	30 June 1653 – 1667 1676 – 2 January 1702	Lordship of Sonderburg (until 1667) Lordship of Franzhagen (jure uxoris, from 1676)	Eleonore Charlotte of Saxe-Lauenburg; 1 November 1676; Franzhagen Castle three children	2 January 1702; Hamburg aged 60	
Sonderburg annexed to Denmark
John Bogislaw	30 September 1629; Nordborg Castle; Son of Frederick and Juliana of Saxe-Lauenburg	22 July 1658 – 1669	Lordship of Norburg	Unmarried	17 December 1679; Nordborg Castle aged 50	Heirs of Frederick. As he didn't pay the high taxes demanded by Denmark, John Bogislaw had his Lordship confiscated, and given to his cousin from Plon. Eleanor had the widowe estate of Osterholm, which after her death also went to Plon.
Eleanor of Anhalt-Zerbst	10 November 1608; Zerbst; Daughter of Rudolph, Prince of Anhalt-Zerbst and Dorothea Hedwig of Brunswick-Wolfenbüttel	22 July 1658 – 2 November 1681	Lordship of Norburg (at Østerholm, Als)	Frederick; 5 February 1632; Nordborg five children	2 November 1681; Østerholm, Als aged 72	Heirs of Frederick. As he didn't pay the high taxes demanded by Denmark, John Bogislaw had his Lordship confiscated, and given to his cousin from Plon. Eleanor had the widowe estate of Osterholm, which after her death also went to Plon.
Norburg and Osterholm annexed to Plon
Christian Albert	3 February 1641; Gottorp; Son of Frederick III and Marie Elisabeth of Saxony	10 August 1659 – 6 January 1695	Duchy of Holstein	Frederica Amalia of Denmark; 24 October 1667; Glücksburg four children	6 January 1695; Gottorp aged 53	
Christian	19 June 1627; Sønderborg Castle; Son of Philip and Sophia Hedwig of Saxe-Lauenburg	27 September 1663 – 17 November 1698	Lordship of Glücksburg	Sibylla Ursula of Brunswick-Wolfenbüttel; September 1663; Wolfenbüttel no children Agnes Hedwig of Sonderburg-Plön; 10 May 1672; Plön seven children	17 November 1698; Glücksburg Castle aged 79	
Christian V	15 April 1646; Duborg Castle; Son of Frederick III and Sophie Amalie of Brunswick-Lüneburg	9 February 1670 – 25 August 1699	Duchy of Schleswig	Charlotte Amalie of Hesse-Kassel; 25 June 1667; Nykøbing Castle eight children	25 August 1699; Copenhagen Castle aged 53	
John Adolph	8 April 1634; Ahrensbök; First son of Joachim Ernest and Dorothea Augusta of Holstein	5 October 1671 – 2 July 1704	Lordship of Plön	Dorothea Sophia of Brunswick-Wolfenbüttel; 2 April 1673; Wolfenbüttel three children	2 July 1704; Ruhleben aged 70	Children of Joachim Ernest, divided their inheritance.
Augustus	9 May 1635; Ahrensbök; Second son of Joachim Ernest and Dorothea Augusta of Holstein	5 October 1671 – 17 September 1699	Lordship of Norburg	Elisabeth Charlotte of Anhalt-Harzgerode; 6 October 1666; Plötzkau five children	17 September 1699; Plön Castle aged 76	Children of Joachim Ernest, divided their inheritance.
Augustus	13 February 1652; Beck; Son of Augustus Philip and Maria Sibylla of Nassau-Saarbrücken	6 May 1675 – 26 September 1689	Lordship of Beck	Hedwig Louise of Lippe-Alverdissen; June 1676; Beck two children	26 September 1689; Bonn aged 37	
Frederick	10 December 1652; First son of Ernest Günther and Augusta of Sonderburg-Glücksburg	18 January 1689 – 3 August 1692	Lordship of Augustenburg	Anna Christine Bereuter no children	3 August 1692; Edingen aged 39	Left no descendants. He was succeeded by his brother.
Frederick	2 February 1651; Hasselheck; Son of Philip Louis and Anna Margaret of Hesse-Homburg	10 March 1689 – 7 October 1724	Lordship of Wiesenburg	Karolina of Legnica-Brieg; 14 July 1672; Brzeg Castle (annulled 1680) one child	7 October 1724; Wiesenburg Castle aged 73	
Regency of Hedwig Louise of Lippe-Alverdissen (1689-1700)						
Frederick William I	2 May 1682; Beck; Son of Augustus and Hedwig Louise of Lippe-Alverdissen	26 September 1689 – 26 June 1719	Lordship of Beck	Maria Antonia Isnardi di Castello, Countess of Sanfrè; 8 February 1708; Munich two children	26 June 1719; Battle of Francavilla aged 37	
Ernest Augustus	30 October 1660; Sønderborg; Second son of Ernest Günther and Augusta of Sonderburg-Glücksburg	3 August 1692 – 12 March 1731	Lordship of Augustenburg	Marie Therese von Velbruck (d.1712); 1695 no children	12 March 1731; Hamburg aged 70	Left no descendants. He was succeeded by nephew.
Frederick IV	18 October 1671; Gottorp Castle; Son of Christian Albert and Frederica Amalia of Denmark	6 January 1695 – 19 July 1702	Duchy of Holstein	Hedvig Sophia of Sweden; 12 May 1698; Karlberg one child	19 July 1702; Kliszów aged 30	
Philip Ernest	5 May 1673; Glücksburg Castle; Son of Christian and Agnes Hedwig of Sonderburg-Plön	17 November 1698 – 12 November 1729	Lordship of Glücksburg	Christine of Saxe-Eisenberg; 15 February 1699; Eisenberg seven children Catharina Christina von Ahlefeldt; 2 September 1722 no children Charlotte Marie of Sonderburg-Augustenburg; 17 October 1726 no children	12 November 1729; Glücksburg Castle aged 56	
Frederick IV	11 October 1671; Copenhagen Castle; Son of Christian V and Charlotte Amalie of Hesse-Kassel	25 August 1699 – 12 October 1730	Duchy of Schleswig	Louise of Mecklenburg-Güstrow; 5 December 1695; Copenhagen five children Elisabeth Helene von Vieregg; 6 September 1703 (bigamous) one child Anne Sophie Reventlow; 4 April 1721; Copenhagen three children	12 October 1730; Odense Palace aged 59	
Regency of Hedvig Sophia of Sweden (1702-1708); Regency of Hedwig Eleonora of Holstein (1708-1715)						
Charles Frederick	30 April 1700; Stockholm; Son of Frederick IV and Hedvig Sophia of Sweden	19 July 1702 – 18 June 1739	Duchy of Holstein	Anna Petrovna of Russia; 21 May 1725; St Petersburg one child	18 June 1739; Rohlfshagen aged 39	
Eleonore Charlotte of Saxe-Lauenburg	8 August 1646; Marianowo; Daughter of Francis Henry, Duke of Sae-Lauenburg and Marie Juliane of Nassau-Siegen	2 January 1702 – 26 January 1709	Lordship of Franzhagen	Christian Adolph I 1 November 1676; Franzhagen Castle three children	26 January 1709; Franzhagen Castle aged 62	Eleonore ruled the castle after her husband's death, together with her children and grandchildren. Leopold's sons, as result of a morganatic marriage, couldn't be heirs to the lordship.
Leopold Christian	25 August 1678; Franzhagen Castle; First son of Christian Adolph I and Eleonore Charlotte of Saxe-Lauenburg	2 January 1702 – 13 July 1707	Lordship of Franzhagen	Anna Sophia Segelke (morganatic) three children	30 June 1653; Sønderborg aged 46	Eleonore ruled the castle after her husband's death, together with her children and grandchildren. Leopold's sons, as result of a morganatic marriage, couldn't be heirs to the lordship.
Louis Charles	4 June 1684; Franzhagen Castle; Second son of Christian Adolph I and Eleonore Charlotte of Saxe-Lauenburg	13 July – 11 October 1707	Lordship of Franzhagen	Anna Barbara Dorothea von Winterfeld; 1705; Ottensen two children	11 October 1707; Franzhagen Castle aged 23	Eleonore ruled the castle after her husband's death, together with her children and grandchildren. Leopold's sons, as result of a morganatic marriage, couldn't be heirs to the lordship.
Christian Adolph II	16 September 1707; Son of Louis Charles and Anna Barbara Dorothea von Winterfeld	11 October 1707 – 26 March 1709	Lordship of Franzhagen	Unmarried	26 March 1709 aged 1	Eleonore ruled the castle after her husband's death, together with her children and grandchildren. Leopold's sons, as result of a morganatic marriage, couldn't be heirs to the lordship.
Franzhagen annexed to Schleswig
Regency of Elisabeth Sophia of Sonderburg-Norburg (1704-1706)						Grandson of John Adolphus, died as a minor.
Leopold Augustus	11 August 1702; Plön; Son of Adolph Augustus of Sonderburg-Plön and Elisabeth Sophia of Sonderburg-Norburg	2 July 1704 – 4 November 1706	Lordship of Plön	Unmarried	4 November 1706; Plön aged 4	Grandson of John Adolphus, died as a minor.
Joachim Frederick	9 May 1668; Magdeburg; Son of Augustus and Elisabeth Charlotte of Anhalt-Harzgerode	17 September 1699 – 4 November 1706 4 November 1706 – 25 January 1722	Lordship of Plön (at Norburg until 1706)	Magdalene Juliana of the Palatinate-Gelnhausen; 1704 four children Juliana Louise of East Frisia; 17 February 1721 one child	25 January 1722; Plön aged 53	Heirs of Augustus. In 1706, Joachim Frederick inherited Plon from his cousin, and from that year ruled from there.
Elisabeth Charlotte of Anhalt-Harzgerode	11 February 1647; Harzgerode; Daughter of Frederick, Prince of Anhalt-Harzgerode and Johanna Elisabeth of Nassau-Hadamar	17 September 1699 – 20 January 1723	Lordship of Norburg (at Østerholm, Als)	Augustus; 6 October 1666; Plötzkau five children	20 January 1723; Sønderborg aged 75	Heirs of Augustus. In 1706, Joachim Frederick inherited Plon from his cousin, and from that year ruled from there.
Norburg (and Osteholm) definitively annexed to Plon
Maria Antonia Isnardi di Castello	15 October 1692; Munich; Daughter of Francesco Antonio Isnardi di Castello and Maria Magdalene Grundemann von Falkenberg	26 June 1719 – 1732	Lordship of Beck	Frederick William I 8 February 1708; Munich two children	18 February 1762; Vienna aged 69	Maria Antonia inherited the Lordship (the property of Beck) from her husband and shared it with her mother-in-law. In 1732, she sold it to her husband's first cousin and successor.
Hedwig Louise of Lippe-Alverdissen	6 May 1650; Daughter of Philip I, Count of Schaumburg-Lippe and Sophie of Hesse-Kassel	26 June 1719 – 18 March 1731	Lordship of Beck	August; June 1676; Beck two children	18 March 1731 aged 80	Maria Antonia inherited the Lordship (the property of Beck) from her husband and shared it with her mother-in-law. In 1732, she sold it to her husband's first cousin and successor.
Frederick Charles	4 August 1706; Sønderborg Castle; Son of Prince Christian Charles of Schleswig-Holstein-Sonderburg-Plön-Norburg and Dorothea Christina of Aichelberg	25 January 1722 – 19 October 1761	Lordship of Plön	Christine Armgard Reventlow; 12 May 1633 nine children	19 October 1761; Traventhal aged 55	Nephew of Joachim Frederick. Given the morganatic marriage of their parents, his status was only recognized since 1729. After his death with no descendants, Plon reverted to Schleswig.
Plon annexed to Schleswig
Leopold	12 January 1674; Brzeg; Son of Frederick and Karolina of Legnica-Brieg	7 October 1724 – 1725	Lordship of Wiesenburg	Maria Elisabeth of Liechtenstein; 6 March 1713; Lemgo five children	4 March 1744; Vienna aged 70	Left no male descendants. Wiesenburg was sold to Poland.
Wiesenburg annexed to Poland
Frederick	1 April 1701; Glücksburg Castle; Son of Philip Ernest and Christine of Saxe-Eisenberg	12 November 1729 – 10 November 1766	Lordship of Glücksburg	Henriette Augusta of Lippe-Detmold; 19 June 1745 five children	10 November 1766; Glücksburg Castle aged 65	
Christian VI	30 November 1699; Copenhagen Castle; Son of Frederick IV and Louise of Mecklenburg-Güstrow	12 October 1730 – 6 August 1746	Duchy of Schleswig	Sophia Magdalene of Brandenburg-Kulmbach; 7 August 1721; Pretzsch Castle three children	6 August 1746; Hirschholm Palace aged 46	
Regency of Adolf Frederick of Holstein (1739-1745)						Through his mother, he was an heir to the Russian throne, and later ascended as Emperor Peter III of Russia.
Charles Peter Ulrich	21 February 1728; Kiel; Son of Charles Frederick and Anna Petrovna of Russia	18 June 1739 – 17 July 1762	Duchy of Holstein	Sophie Augusta of Anhalt-Zerbst; 21 August 1745; St Petersburg one child	17 July 1762; Ropsha aged 34	Through his mother, he was an heir to the Russian throne, and later ascended as Emperor Peter III of Russia.
Christian Augustus I	4 August 1696; Augustenborg Palace; Son of Frederick William of Schleswig-Holstein-Sonderburg-Augustenburg and Sophia Amalia of Ahlefeldt	12 March 1731 – 20 January 1754	Lordship of Augustenburg	Frederikke Louise Danneskiold-Samsøe; 21 July 1720; Kalundborg eight children	20 January 1754; Augustenborg Palace aged 79	Nephew of Ernest Augustus.
Frederick William II	18 June 1687; Potsdam; Son of Frederick of Louis of Sonderburg-Beck and Louise Charlotte of Sonderburg-Augustenburg	1732 – 1745	Lordship of Beck	Louise Felicitas Eleonora of Loß (d.1715) no children Ursula Anna of Dohna-Schlodien (31 December 1700 – 17 March 1761) two children	11 November 1749; Königsberg aged 62	Recovered the property of the family in 1732, but, indebted, sold it again to the Barons of Wulffen, and wasn't recovered again.
Beck sold to the Barons of Wulffen
Frederick V	31 March 1723; Copenhagen Castle; Son of Christian VI and Sophia Magdalene of Brandenburg-Kulmbach	6 August 1746 – 14 January 1766	Duchy of Schleswig	Louise of Great Britain; 11 December 1743; Altona five children Juliana Maria of Brunswick-Wolfenbüttel; 8 July 1752; Frederiksborg Palace one child	14 January 1766; Christiansborg Palace aged 42	
Frederick Christian I	6 April 1721; Augustenborg Palace; Son of Christian Augustus I and Frederikke Louise Danneskiold-Samsøe	20 January 1754 – 13 November 1794	Lordship of Augustenburg	Charlotte Amalie of Sonderburg-Plön; 26 May 1762; Reinfeld seven children	13 November 1794; Augustenborg Palace aged 73	
Regency of Sophie Augusta of Anhalt-Zerbst (Catherine the Great) (1762-1773)						In 1773, through the Treaty of Tsarskoye Selo, his mother, Catherine the Great, as his regent, surrendered the duchy to Paul's relatives at Schleswig. Paul later succeeded his mother as Emperor or Russia.
Paul	1 October 1754; St Petersburg; Son of Charles Peter Ulrich and Sophie Augusta of Anhalt-Zerbst	17 July 1762 – 1 June 1773	Duchy of Holstein	Wilhelmina Louisa of Hesse-Darmstadt; 20 September 1773; St Petersburg no children Sophie Dorothea of Württemberg; 7 October 1776; St Petersburg ten children	23 March 1801; St Michael's Castle aged 46	In 1773, through the Treaty of Tsarskoye Selo, his mother, Catherine the Great, as his regent, surrendered the duchy to Paul's relatives at Schleswig. Paul later succeeded his mother as Emperor or Russia.
Holstein reunited with Schleswig
Christian VII	29 January 1749; Christiansborg Palace; Son of Frederick V and Louise of Great Britain	14 January 1766 – 13 March 1808	Duchy of Schleswig	Caroline Matilda of Great Britain; 8 November 1766; Christiansborg Palace two children	13 March 1808; Rendsburg aged 59	Due to mental illness, his government was taken over by several regents.
Regency of Caroline Matilda of Great Britain and Johann Friedrich Struensee (1770-1772); Regency of Juliana Maria of Brunswick-Wolfenbüttel and her son Prince Frederick of Denmark (1772-1784); Regency of Crown Prince Frederick of Denmark (1784-1808)						Due to mental illness, his government was taken over by several regents.
Frederick Henry William	15 March 1747; Glücksburg Castle; Son of Frederick and Henriette Augusta of Lippe-Detmold	10 November 1766 – 13 March 1779	Lordship of Glücksburg	Anna Carolina of Nassau-Saarbrücken; 9 August 1779; Saarbrücken no children	13 March 1779; Glücksburg Castle aged 79	Left no descendants. After his death, Glücksburg was absorbed by Schleswig.
Glücksburg annexed to Schleswig
Frederick Augustus I	20 September 1711; Gottorp; Son of Christian August of Holstein-Gottorp and Albertina Frederica of Baden-Durlach	14 December 1773 – 6 July 1785	Duchy of Oldenburg ( Holstein line)	Ulrike Friederike Wilhelmine of Hesse-Kassel; 21 November 1752; Kassel three children	6 July 1785; Oldenburg aged 73	Came from the Holstein line. Brother of Adolf Frederick of Sweden, who was previously regent in Holstein. In 1773, possibly for compensation on the annexation of Holstein to Schleswig, Frederick Augustus was given the old land of Oldenburg, now converted to a duchy.
Regency of Peter of Oldenburg, Prince-Bishop of Lübeck (1785-1810, 1813-1823)						Due to mental illness, Wilhelm was duke in name only, being under regency of his cousin, who later succeeded him.
William	3 January 1754; Eutin; Son of Frederick Augustus I and Ulrike Friederike Wilhelmine of Hesse-Kassel	6 July 1785 – 1810 1813 – 2 July 1823	Duchy of Oldenburg ( Holstein line) (until 1815) Grand Duchy of Oldenburg ( Holstein line) (since 1815)	Unmarried	2 July 1823; Schloss Plön aged 69	Due to mental illness, Wilhelm was duke in name only, being under regency of his cousin, who later succeeded him.
Oldenburg annexed to France (1810–1813)
Frederick Christian II	28 September 1765; Augustenborg Palace; Son of Frederick Christian I and Charlotte Amalie of Sonderburg-Plön	13 November 1794 – 14 June 1814	Lordship of Augustenburg	Louise Augusta of Denmark; 27 May 1786; Christiansborg Palace three children	14 June 1814; Augustenborg Palace aged 48	
Frederick VI	28 January 1768; Christiansborg Palace; Son of Christian VII and Caroline Matilda of Great Britain	13 March 1808 – 3 December 1839	Duchy of Schleswig	Marie Sophie of Hesse-Kassel; 31 July 1790; Gottorp Castle eight children	3 December 1839; Amalienborg Palace aged 71	Regent since 1784. Had no male descendants. The throne passed to his cousin.
Christian Augustus II	19 July 1798; Copenhagen; Son of Frederick Christian II and Louise Augusta of Denmark	14 June 1814 – 30 October 1864	Lordship of Augustenburg	Louise Sophie Danneskiold-Samsøe; 18 September 1820; Copenhagen ten children	11 March 1869; Przemków aged 70	In the aftermath of the Second Schleswig War, the family lost sovereignty.
Augustenburg annexed to Denmark
Peter I	17 January 1755; Rastede; Son of Prince Georg Ludwig of Holstein-Gottorp and Sophie Charlotte of Sonderburg-Beck	2 July 1823 – 21 May 1829	Grand Duchy of Oldenburg ( Holstein line)	Frederica of Württemberg; 6 June 1781 two children	21 May 1829; Oldenburg aged 74	Previous Prince-Bishop of Lubeck and regent. Cousin of his predecessor.
Frederick William	4 January 1785; Lipowina; Son of Frederick Charles Louis of Sonderburg-Beck and Friederike of Schlieben	6 July 1825 – 17 February 1831	Lordship of Glücksburg (Beck line)	Louise Caroline of Hesse-Kassel; 26 January 1810; Gottorf Castle ten children	17 February 1831; Gottorf Castle aged 46	From the Beck line, he was granted, by Frederick VI of Denmark, the previously annexed "duchy" (lordship) of Glücksburg.
Augustus	13 July 1783; Rastede; Son of Peter I and Frederica of Württemberg	21 May 1829 – 27 February 1853	Grand Duchy of Oldenburg ( Holstein line)	Adelheid of Anhalt-Bernburg-Schaumburg-Hoym; 24 July 1817 two children Ida of Anhalt-Bernburg-Schaumburg-Hoym; 24 June 1825 one child Cecilia of Sweden; 5 May 1831 three children	27 February 1853; Oldenburg aged 69	
Charles	30 September 1813; Gottorp; First son of Frederick William and Louise Caroline of Hesse-Kassel	17 February 1831 – 24 October 1878	Lordship of Glücksburg (Beck line)	Wilhelmine Marie of Denmark; 19 May 1838; Copenhagen no children	24 October 1878; Glücksburg Castle aged 65	Left no descendants. He was succeeded by his brother.
Christian VIII	18 September 1786; Christiansborg Palace; Son of Frederick, Hereditary Prince of Denmark and Duchess Sophia Frederica of Mecklenburg-Schwerin	3 December 1839 – 20 January 1848	Duchy of Schleswig	Charlotte Frederica of Mecklenburg-Schwerin; 21 June 1806; Ludwigslust Castle two sons Caroline Amalie of Sonderburg-Augustenburg; 22 May 1815; Augustenborg Palace no children	20 January 1848; Amalienborg Palace aged 61	Son of Frederick, only son of Frederick V and his second wife Juliana Maria.
Frederick VII	6 October 1808; Amalienborg Palace; Son of Christian VIII and Charlotte Frederica of Mecklenburg-Schwerin	20 January 1848 – 15 November 1863	Duchy of Schleswig	Wilhelmine Marie of Denmark; 1 November 1828; Christiansborg Palace no children Caroline of Mecklenburg; 10 June 1841; Neustrelitz no children Louise Rasmussen; 7 August 1850; Frederiksborg Palace (morganatic) no children	15 November 1863; Glücksburg Castle aged 55	Left no descendants. The throne was inherited by a cousin.
Peter II	8 July 1827; Oldenburg; Son of Augustus and Ida of Anhalt-Bernburg-Schaumburg-Hoym	27 February 1853 – 13 June 1900	Grand Duchy of Oldenburg ( Holstein line)	Elisabeth of Saxe-Altenburg; 10 February 1852 two children	13 June 1900; Rastede aged 72	
Christian IX	8 April 1818; Gottorp Castle; Son of Frederick William, Duke of Sonderburg-Glücksburg and Louise Caroline of Hesse-Kassel	15 November 1863 – 30 October 1864	Duchy of Schleswig	Louise of Hesse-Kassel; 26 May 1842; Amalienborg Palace six children	29 January 1906; Amalienborg Palace aged 87	Great-grandson of Frederick V and male-line descendant of Christian III. After the Treaty of Vienna (1864), Christian lost Schleswig to a joint coalition of Prussia and Austria. See List of Danish monarchs for extended information on the descendants of Christian IX.
In 1864, Schleswig was divided between Prussia and Austria, and, in 1870, joined Germany
Frederick	23 October 1814; Schleswig; Second son of Frederick William and Louise Caroline of Hesse-Kassel	24 October 1878 – 27 November 1885	Lordship of Glücksburg (Beck line)	Adelaide of Schaumburg-Lippe; 16 October 1841; Bückeburg five children	27 November 1885; Glücksburg Castle aged 71	
Frederick Ferdinand	12 October 1855; Kiel; Son of Frederick and Adelaide of Schaumburg-Lippe	27 November 1885 – 11 November 1918	Lordship of Glücksburg (Beck line)	Caroline Mathilde of Sonderburg-Augustenburg; 19 March 1885; Przemków six children	21 January 1934; Przemków aged 78	In 1918, after the abolition of the monarchy in Germany, the family lost sovereignty.
Frederick Augustus II	16 November 1852; Oldenburg; Son of Peter II and Elisabeth of Saxe-Altenburg	13 June 1900 – 11 November 1918	Grand Duchy of Oldenburg ( Holstein line)	Elisabeth Anna of Prussia; 18 February 1878 two children Elisabeth of Mecklenburg-Schwerin; 24 October 1896 five children	24 February 1931; Rastede aged 78	In 1918, after the end of the German Empire, the Grand Duchy was abolished.
In 1918, Oldenburg joined the Weimar Republic
