= Eleonore Charlotte of Saxe-Lauenburg-Franzhagen =

- Born: 8 August 1646; Marienfließ in Pomerania
- Died: 26 January 1709 (aged 62); Franzhagen Castle, Schulendorf
- Noble family: House of Saxe-Lauenburg-Franzhagen
- Spouse: Duke Christian Adolph of Schleswig-Holstein-Sonderburg
- Father: Duke Francis Henry of Saxe-Lauenburg
- Mother: Countess Marie Juliane of Nassau-Siegen

Eleonore Charlotte of Saxe-Lauenburg-Franzhagen (German: Eleonore Charlotte von Sachsen-Lauenburg; born: 8 August 1646 in Marienfließ in Pomerania; died: 26 January 1709 in Franzhagen Castle, Schulendorf) was a duchess of Saxe-Lauenburg by birth and, by marriage, Duchess of Schleswig-Holstein-Sonderburg-Franzhagen, whose line and territorial legacy she co-founded.

== Life ==
Eleanor Charlotte was the younger of two daughters of Duke Francis Henry of Saxe-Lauenburg (1604–1658), who held Franzhagen as an appanage, from his marriage to Marie Juliane (1612–1665), daughter of John VII, Count of Nassau-Siegen.

She married on 1 November 1676 Duke Christian Adolph of Schleswig-Holstein-Sonderburg (1641–1702). After the death of her older sister Erdmuthe Sophie in 1689, Eleonore Charlotte became the heiress of Franzhagen with the corresponding Castle. In 1667 Christian Adolph and his hereditary estates went bankrupt, and King Frederick III of Denmark as the liege lord retracted the fief. Eleanor Charlotte traveled to Copenhagen, and negotiated personally but unsuccessfully with the king for the return of the territories.

As a compensation for the lost territories, her spouse received an annual stipend from the Danish Crown, which helped Eleonore Charlotte and Christian Adolph to fund a princely lifestyle, to which they were accustomed to.

After the death of her cousin Julius Francis, the last Duke of Saxe-Lauenburg, Eleanor Charlotte - like his daughters Anna Maria Franziska and Sibylle - unsuccessfully argued that she should inherit. After George William, Duke of Brunswick and Lunenburg, Prince of Celle, had successfully conquered and annexed Saxe-Lauenburg proper, Eleonore Charlotte continued to pursue her succession in the Saxe-Lauenburgian exclave of the Land of Hadeln, which, however, came under imperial stewardship. However, under Salic law, women were not allowed to inherit.

The couple moved to Franzhagen Castle in the Duchy of Saxe-Lauenburg, which Eleonore Charlotte had inherited, thereby founding the Schleswig-Holstein-Sonderburg-Franzhagen line. After the death of her husband, Eleanor Charlotte kept the castle as dower, because both her sons had married morganatically.

== Descendants ==
From her marriage, Eleanor Charlotte had the following children:

- Christian Leopold (1678–1707), Duke of Schleswig-Holstein-Sonderburg-Franzhagen

married morganatically Anna Sophia Segelke (born: 1684); children not allowed to inherit Franzhagen

- Unnamed child (1679–1679)
- Louis Charles, Duke of Schleswig-Holstein-Sonderburg-Franzhagen (1684–1708)

married morganatically in 1705 Anna Barbara Dorothea von Winterfeld (1670-1739), daughter of Barthold Dietrich von Winterfeld and Sophie Margarete von Warnstedt. Although she belonged to lower nobility, their marriage was later recognized as equal and their children thus had succession rights and were able to inherit the Duchy.

* Christian II Adolph (1708-1709) was dynasticized, allowing him to become a Duke after the death of his father and able to inherit Franzhagen line.

- John Francis (1685–1687)

== References and sources ==
- Verein für Mecklenburgische Geschichte und Alterthumskunde, Schwerin: Mecklenburgische Jahrbücher, vol. 31–32, 1866
- Johann Samuel Ersch: Allgemeine Encyclopädie der Wissenschaften und Künste in alphabetischer Folge, vol 48, J. f. Gleditsch, 1848, p. 129 ff (Digitized)
