= Coat of arms of Oldenburg =

Coat of arms of the Grand Duchy of Oldenburg

Versions
- Heraldic shield of the arms

The coat of arms of Oldenburg is the coat of arms associated with the state of Oldenburg, a county, duchy, and then grand duchy that existed between 1101 and 1918. The arms are often associated with the parts of the House of Oldenburg that ruled the state.

== History ==
The coats of arms used by the rulers of Oldenburg changed considerably over time. The lines of the house of Oldenburg began using a coat of arms in the 12th century. The ruling counts increased in accordance with personal preference and political calculations over time.

=== Development ===
County of Oldenburg
Coat of Arms	Period	Description
	ca. 1200	Count Moritz I bears as his arms a field Or with two bars dancetty, in an undated charter from about 1200.
	ca. 1210-1230	The sons of Moritz I, Christian II, and Otto I, adopted the shield per fess of five pieces, with two bars upon a field Or, termed “fünf Stücke,” which from the 15th century onwards was regarded as the hereditary arms of the comital house. As early as 1517, Bernhard Witte, in his chronicle Historia Westphaliae, recorded the legend of the origin of the arms. According to this tale, Emperor Henry IV imposed a trial by ordeal upon Count Frederick of Ammerland and Rüstringen, alleged ancestor of the House of Oldenburg, to clear accusations against his father. After Frederick slew a lion, the emperor dipped two fingers into the beast’s blood and drew two bars upon his golden shield as a token of victory. For this reason, the bars are also referred to as the “Ammersche Balken” (Ammerland bars).
	1475	On a charter of 1475, Count Gerd the Brave is, for the first time, demonstrably using a heraldic seal with the later customary augmentation of arms. The quarterly shield shows the older “five pieces” in the first and fourth quarters. In the second and third quarters, a cross with flaring, notched ends appears as the so-called Nailhead Cross (Nagelspitz-Kreuz). This charge is regularly associated with the County of Delmenhorst, which, around the same time, came under the rule of the Counts of Oldenburg; it is thus also called the Delmenhorst cross
	1667-1773	After the death of Count Anton Günther in 1667, the County of Oldenburg reverted to the Danish line of the House of Oldenburg, which had ruled Denmark since the accession of Christian I in 1448. The arms of the county were modified under Danish rule to reflect its integration into the Danish kingdom. From the reign of Frederick II onward, the Danish royal arms had displayed the old Oldenburg escutcheon in a simplified form, divided (per pale) rather than quartered: in the dexter, the Ammerland bars; in the sinister, the Delmenhorst cross. This shield was superimposed on the Dannebrog cross, surmounted by a royal crown, and encircled by the collar of the Order of the Elephant.

Duchy of Oldenburg
Coat of Arms	Period	Description
	1776	Friedrich August I, the first Duke of Oldenburg, reinstated a quartered escutcheon featuring the Ammerland bars and the Delmenhorst crosses. This shield is charged with an inescutcheon displaying the arms of the Prince-Bishopric of Lübeck in the then customary composition: a horizontally divided shield, with a mitre in chief and a floating cross in base. The Duke of Oldenburg ruled the Prince-Bishopric of Lübeck in personal union under the Treaty of Tsarskoye Selo.

Duchy of Oldenburg
Coat of Arms	Period	Description
	1829	In 1829, Duke Paul Friedrich August commissioned his government, on the occasion of Oldenburg’s elevation to a Grand Duchy, to formulate a new coat of arms to better reflect the territorial composition of Oldenburg. An inescutcheon displays the arms of all the constituent territories of the Grand Duchy of Oldenburg. A main shield beneath it represents an increased coat of arms of the Dukes of Holstein, illustrating the territories ruled by the House of Oldenburg.

== Design ==
The coat of arms recognised the full acquisitions of the state in those years. Various branches used assorted minor arms; those most associated with the Oldenburg part of the state were copies of the flags of Oldenburg. The inescutcheon was used on the state ensign from 1893 to 1918/1921.

The main shield shows the arms of:

- Kingdom of Norway (top-left);
- Duchy of Schleswig (top-right);
- Duchy of Holstein (middle-left);
- Territory of Stormarn (middle-right);
- Territory of Dithmarschen (bottom-left);
- Lordship of Kniphausen (bottom-right).

The inescutcheon shows the arms of:

- County of Oldenburg (family arms, top-left);
- County of Delmenhorst (family arms, top-right);
- Prince-Bishopric of Lübeck (principality of Eutin, bottom-left);
- Principality of Birkenfeld (bottom-right);
- Lordship of Jever (bottom-middle);
