= Duke Francis Henry of Saxe-Lauenburg =

Duke of Saxe-Lauenburg

- Coat of arms of Sachsen-Lauenburg
- Born: 9 April 1604
- Died: 26 November 1658 (aged 54)
- Spouse: Marie Juliane of Nassau-Siegen
- Issue Detail: Eleanore Charlotte
- Father: Francis II, Duke of Saxe-Lauenburg
- Mother: Maria of Brunswick-Wolfenbüttel

Francis Henry of Saxe-Lauenburg (born: 9 April 1604; died: 26 November 1658) was a Prince of Saxe-Lauenburg

== Life ==
Francis Henry, was the ninth and youngest son of Duke Francis II of Saxe-Lauenburg (1547–1619) from his second marriage to Maria (1566–1626), daughter of Duke Julius of Brunswick and Lunenburg, Prince of Wolfenbüttel. King Henry IV of France was his godfather. In a contract of inheritance dated 1619, Francis Henry recognized his elder brother Augustus as sovereign, in exchange for an annual appanage of 2500 thaler.

When King Gustav II Adolf of Sweden landed in Peenemünde in 1630, Francis Henry entered his service and earned his affection. He fought as colonel and regiment commander under general Johan Banér and was victorious in the Battle of Wittstock in 1636. Gustav Adolf gave Francis Henry the estates of the nunnery of Marienfließ Abbey in Pomerania. On 28 June 1643 Gustav Adolf's daughter, Christina of Sweden, leased Marienfließ to Francis Henry for 10 years, after which it reverted to the new ruler of Pomerania, Frederick William, the Great elector, on 12 December 1653, rewarding Francis Henry's improvements to the estate.

After his mother's death in 1635, he received Franzhagen in a division of her property among her sons. When his brother Augustus died, Francis Henry received Wangelau and Rothenbeck (a part of today's Grande) in addition. While in Swedish service and thereafter he spent a lot of time with Sophia of Schleswig-Holstein-Sonderburg (1579–1658), dowager of Philip II, Duke of Pomerania. Sophia's and Francis Henry's fathers were cousins. It was at her dower in Treptow upon Rega, a former nunnery which she had converted into a castle, where Francis Henry and Marie Juliane of Nassau-Siegen (1612–1665) married on 13 December 1637. Their first child was born in Treptow in 1640.

Francis Henry also served Sophia as administrator of the estates pertaining to her dower. Francis Henry and his brother Francis Charles objected the planned succession of their brother Julius Henry as sole ruler of Saxe-Lauenburg. However, when Julius Henry succeeded their late elder half-brother Augustus, deceased in 1656, this dispute was finally resolved.

Later Francis Henry resided at Franzhagen Castle. Due to his miserliness, his subjects gave him the nickname Francis Drybread (Low German: Franz Drögbrod).

== Marriage and issue ==
Francis Henry married on 13 December 1637 in Treptow upon Rega with Marie Juliane (1612–1665), a daughter of Count John VII of Nassau-Siegen, with whom he had the following children:

- Catherine Marie (1640–1641)
- Christine Juliane (1642–1644)
- Erdmuthe Sophie (1644–1689), married in 1665 Duke Gustav Rudolph of Mecklenburg-Schwerin (1632–1670), son of Adolf Frederick I, Duke of Mecklenburg
- Francis (1645–1645)
- Eleanore Charlotte (1646–1709), married in 1676 Duke Christian Adolph of Schleswig-Holstein-Sonderburg-Franzhagen (1641-1702)
- Erdmann (1649–1660)

Francis Henry had two more children born out of wedlock.

== Ancestry ==
Ancestors of Duke Francis Henry of Saxe-Lauenburg

16. John V, Duke of Saxe-Lauenburg
8. Magnus I, Duke of Saxe-Lauenburg
17. Dorothea of Brandenburg
4. Francis I, Duke of Saxe-Lauenburg
18. Henry IV, Duke of Brunswick and Lunenburg (Wolfenbüttel) (=#24)
9. Catherine of Brunswick and Lunenburg (Wolfenbüttel)
19. Catherine of Pomerania-Wolgast (=#25)
2. Francis II, Duke of Saxe-Lauenburg
20. Albert, Duke of Saxony
10. Henry IV the Pious, Duke of Saxe-Freiberg
21. Sidonie Podiebrad
5. Sybille of Saxe-Freiberg
22. Magnus II, Duke of Mecklenburg-Schwerin
11. Catherine of Mecklenburg-Schwerin
23. Sophia of Pomerania-Wolgast
1. Francis Henry of Saxe-Lauenburg
24. Henry IV, Duke of Brunswick and Lunenburg (Wolfenbüttel) (=#18)
12. Henry V, Duke of Brunswick and Lunenburg (Wolfenbüttel)
25. Catherine of Pomerania-Wolgast (=#19)
6. Julius, Duke of Brunswick and Lunenburg (Wolfenbüttel)
26. Henry, Count of Württemberg-Mömpelgard
13. Mary of Württemberg-Mömpelgard
27. Elisabeth of Zweibrücken-Bitsch
3. Maria of Brunswick-Lüneburg
28. Joachim I Nestor, Elector of Brandenburg
14. Joachim II Hector, Elector of Brandenburg
29. Elizabeth of Denmark, Norway, and Sweden
7. Hedwig of Brandenburg
30. Sigismund I the Old
15. Hedwig Jagiellon
31. Barbara Zápolya
