= Christian III of Oldenburg =

German noble (died 1285)

Christian III
- Count of Oldenburg
- Died: 1285; Oldenburg
- Noble family: House of Oldenburg
- Spouse: Jutta of Bentheim
- Issue: John II, Count of Oldenburg
- Father: John I, Count of Oldenburg
- Mother: Richeza of Hoya-Stumpenhausen

Christian III, Count of Oldenburg (first attested in 1269 – 1285) was a ruling Count of Oldenburg. His parents were John I of Oldenburg and Richeza (or Rixa) of Hoya-Stumpenhausen.

== Life ==
Christian III was first mentioned in a document in 1269 as Dei gratia comes in Aldenborch. From 1272, his brother Otto II appears as co-ruler.

During the early years of his reign, the ministeriales, led by the Knight Robert von Westerholt, revolted. The rebels managed to invade the city of Oldenburg. Christian, who was still defending Oldenburg Castle, set the city on fire, so that the attackers were left with neither food nor shelter, and had to withdraw. Christian pursued them, and decisively defeated them in the Battle of the Tungeler Marsh. Robert von Westerholt and other rebellious noblemen were taken prisoner. The chronicle of Rasted describes his victory in great detail.

In contemporary sources, Christian is described as peace-loving ("... the peasants lived in peace and complete tranquility") and friendly towards the church. He was pious and also knew how to enjoy life ("... loved a good wine").

He married Jutta of Bentheim and had three sons. His oldest son, John II succeeded in 1285 as Count of Oldenburg; Otto became Archbishop of Bremen in 1344.

== See also ==
- List of rulers of Oldenburg

Christian III of Oldenburg House of Oldenburg Died: 1285
Regnal titles
Preceded by John I	Count of Oldenburg; 1270–1285	Succeeded by John II
