= Duchy of Oldenburg =

German state (1774–1810)

Coordinates: 53°8′38″N 8°12′50″E

Duchy of Oldenburg Herzogtum Oldenburg (German)
- 1774–1810
- Flag (1774) Coat of arms

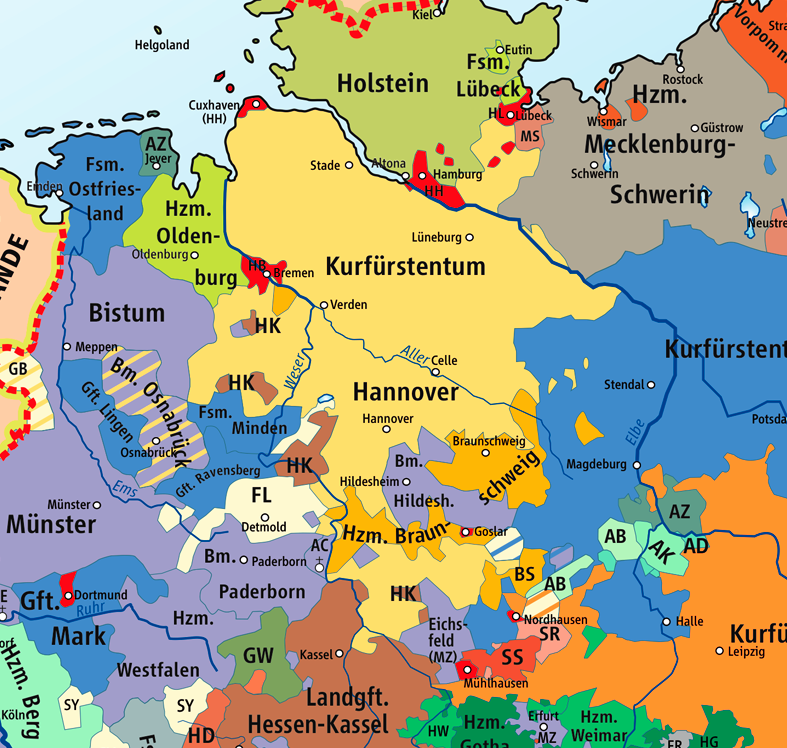
- Location of the later Duchy of Oldenburg within the Holy Roman Empire (upper left, light green)
- Capital: Oldenburg
- Government: Feudal monarchy
- Duke of Oldenburg
  - 1774–85: Frederick August I (first duke)
  - 1785–1810 (restored 1813–23): William I (last duke before French annexation)
- History
  - Created on breakup of Saxony: 1091
  - Raised to duchy: 1774
  - Annexed by France: 1810
  - Re-established as a grand duchy: 1815
Preceded by	Succeeded by
County of Oldenburg	First French Empire; Grand Duchy of Oldenburg
- Today part of: Germany

The Duchy of Oldenburg (German: Herzogtum Oldenburg), named for its capital, the town of Oldenburg, was a state in the north-west of present-day Germany.

On the death of Count Anthony Günther in 1667, the county of Oldenburg was inherited by King Frederick III of Denmark, a member of the Danish line of the House of Oldenburg. In 1773, the Treaty of Tsarskoye Selo transferred the county to Frederick August I of the junior Holstein-Gottorp branch. Subsequently, the county was elevated to a duchy.

After annexation by the French Empire in 1810, the duchy was restored as a grand duchy in 1815. Duke Peter I assumed the title of Grand Duke of Oldenburg in 1823.

Over time, the House of Oldenburg came to rule in Denmark, Norway, Sweden, Greece and Russia. The heir of a junior line of the Greek branch, through Prince Philip, Duke of Edinburgh, hold the thrones of the United Kingdom and the other Commonwealth realms after the passing of Queen Elizabeth II.

== History ==
The first known count of Oldenburg was Elimar I (d. 1108). Elimar's descendants appear as vassals, though sometimes rebellious ones, of the dukes of Saxony; but they attained the dignity of princes of the empire when the emperor Frederick I dismembered the Saxon duchy in 1180. At this time, the county of Delmenhorst formed part of the dominions of the counts of Oldenburg, but afterwards it was on several occasions separated from them to form an appanage for younger branches of the family. This was the case between 1262 and 1447, between 1463 and 1547, and between 1577 and 1617.

During the early part of the 13th century, the counts carried on a series of wars with independent, or semi-independent, Frisian princes to the north and west of the county, which resulted in a gradual expansion of the Oldenburgian territory. The Free Hanseatic City of Bremen and the bishop of Münster were also frequently at war with the counts of Oldenburg.

In 1440, Christian succeeded his father Dietrich, called Fortunatus, as Count of Oldenburg. In 1448 Christian was elected king of Denmark as Christian I, partly based on his maternal descent from previous Danish kings. Although far away from the Danish borders, Oldenburg was now a Danish exclave. The control over the town was left to the king's brothers, who established a short reign of tyranny.

In 1450, Christian became king of Norway and in 1457, king of Sweden. In 1460, he inherited the Duchy of Schleswig and the County of Holstein, an event of high importance for the future history of Oldenburg. In 1454, he handed over Oldenburg to his brother Gerhard (about 1430–99), a wild prince, who was constantly at war with the prince-bishop of Bremen and other neighbors. In 1483, Gerhard was compelled to abdicate in favor of his sons, and he died while on pilgrimage in Spain.

Early in the 16th century, Oldenburg was again enlarged at the expense of the Frisians. Lutheranism was introduced into the county by Anthony I (1505–73, r. from 1529), who also suppressed the monasteries; however, he remained loyal to Charles V, Holy Roman Emperor during the Schmalkaldic War, and was able thus to increase his territories, obtaining Delmenhorst in 1547. One of Anthony's brothers, Christopher (about 1506–60), won some reputation as a soldier.

Anthony's grandson, Anthony Günther (1583–1667), who succeeded in 1603, considered himself the wisest prince who had yet ruled Oldenburg. Jever had been acquired before he became count, but in 1624 he added Kniphausen and Varel to his lands, with which in 1647 Delmenhorst was finally united. By his neutrality during the Thirty Years' War and by donating valuable horses to the warlord, the Count of Tilly, Anthony Günther secured for his dominions an immunity from the terrible devastation to which nearly all the other states of Germany were exposed. He also obtained from the emperor the right to levy tolls on vessels passing along the Weser, a lucrative grant which soon formed a material addition to his resources. In 1607 he erected a schloss in the Renaissance architectural style. After the death of Anthony Günther, Oldenburg fell again under Danish authority.

Under the 1773 Treaty of Tsarskoye Selo, Christian VII of Denmark surrendered the county to Catherine the Great in exchange for her son and heir Paul's share in the condominial royal-ducal government of the Duchy of Holstein and his claims to the ducal share in the government of the Duchy of Schleswig; Oldenburg went to Frederick August, Administrator of the Prince-Bishopric of Lübeck, the representative of a younger branch of the family, and in 1777 the county was raised to the rank of a duchy. The duke's son William, who succeeded his father in 1785, suffered from mental illness, and his cousin Peter, Administrator of the Prince-Bishopric of Lübeck, acted as regent and eventually, in 1823, inherited the throne, holding the Prince-Bishopric of Lübeck and Oldenburg in personal union.

By the German Mediatisation of 1803, Oldenburg acquired the Oldenburg Münsterland and the Prince-Bishopric of Lübeck. Between 1810 and 1814, Oldenburg was occupied by Napoleonic France. Its annexation into the French Empire, in 1810, was one of the causes for the diplomatic rift between former allies France and Russia, a dispute that would lead to war in 1812 and eventually to Napoleon's downfall.

=== Jewish history ===
The oldest documentation of Jews living in the Duchy of Oldenburg is dated to the Middle Ages. The Jewish grand community of the Duchy consisted of the Delmenhorst, Jever, Varel, Vechta and Wildeshausen communities. Other documentations report of a Jewish deportation from Wildeshausen at around 1348, during the time of the Black death, though they came back short after, as mentioned in other documents Jewish presence continued to be reported, especially in the main city of Oldenburg but also in the villages surrounding it, and the total Jewish community of the area of the duchy in 1900 raised to 1359, but declined to 1015 in 1925. By 1933, only 279 Jews were left in the area, and most of them were annihilated during the Holocaust, though some survived and returned after the war.

The duchy was the last part of Napoleon's conquered lands to complete his 1808 decree that the Jews adopt surnames. The names picked at that time are the ones popular nowadays among Ashkenazi Jews.

== Aftermath ==
In 1815, the Duchy acquired the Principality of Birkenfeld and became a grand duchy. In 1871, Oldenburg joined the German Empire, and in 1918, it became a free state within the Weimar Republic.

In 1937 (with the Greater Hamburg Act), it lost the exclave districts of Eutin near the Baltic coast and Birkenfeld in southwestern Germany to Prussia and gained the City of Wilhelmshaven. However, this was a formality, as the Hitler régime had de facto abolished the states of the Weimar Republic in 1934. By the beginning of World War II in 1939, as a result of these territorial changes, Oldenburg had an area of 5,375 square kilometres (2,075 sq mi) and 580,000 inhabitants.

In 1946, after World War II, Oldenburg merged into the newly founded state of Lower Saxony and formed, territorially unchanged, the administrative region (Verwaltungsbezirk) of Oldenburg. The Region and State both became a part of West Germany in 1949. The administrative region was abolished in 1978 and merged with neighbouring governorates (Regierungsbezirke) into the new region of Weser-Ems, which was dissolved in 2004.

== Gallery ==
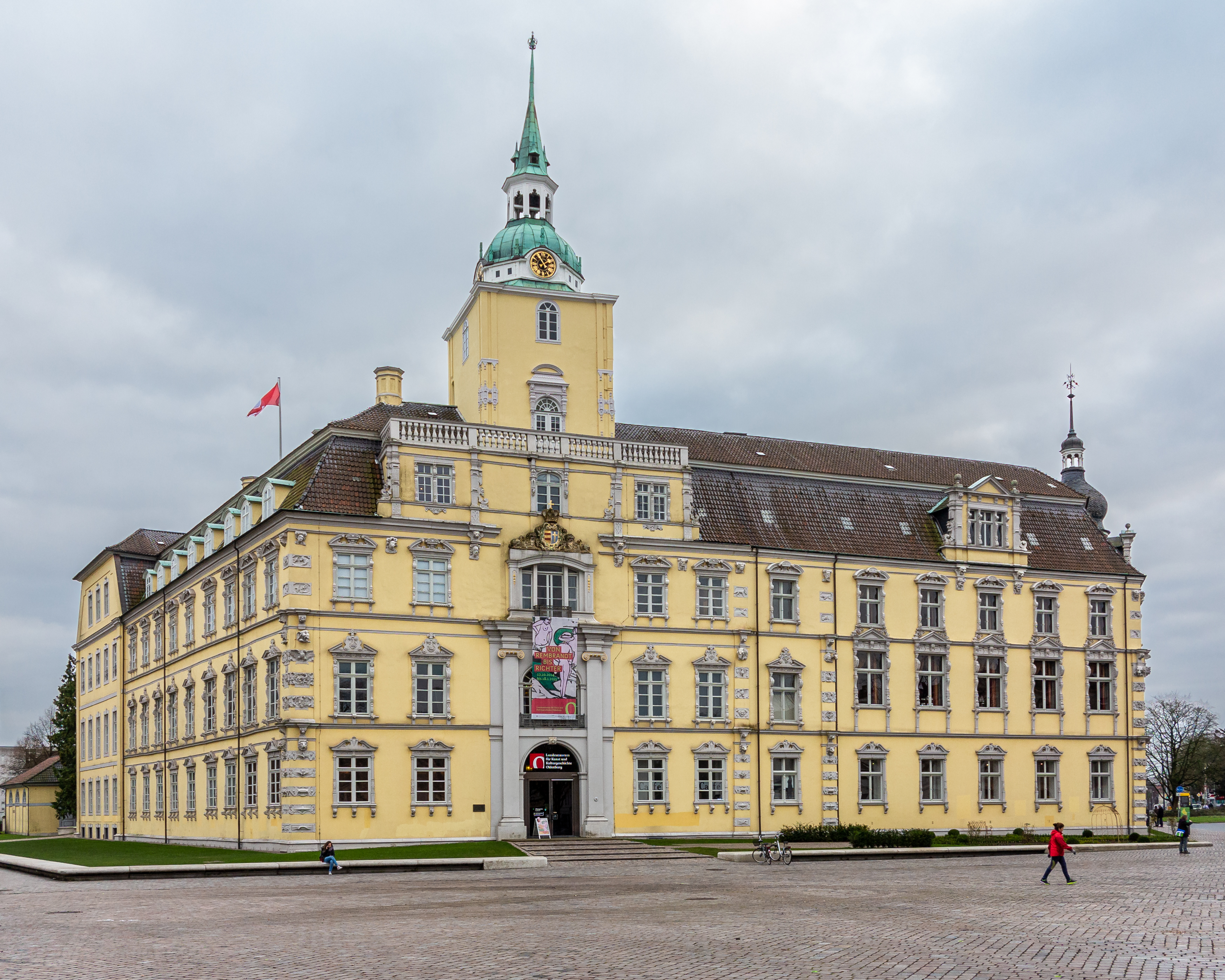
Schloss Oldenburg

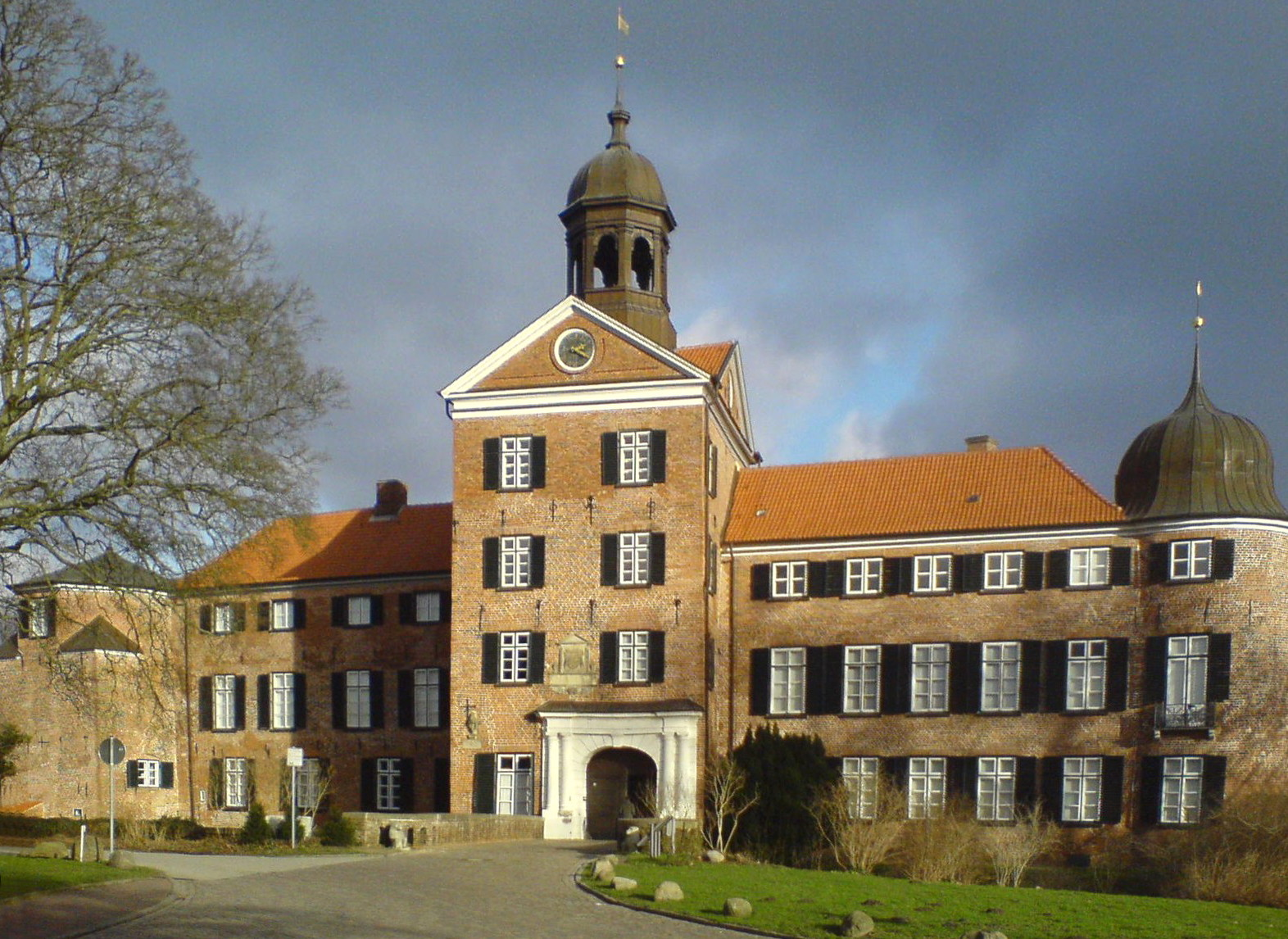
Eutin Castle

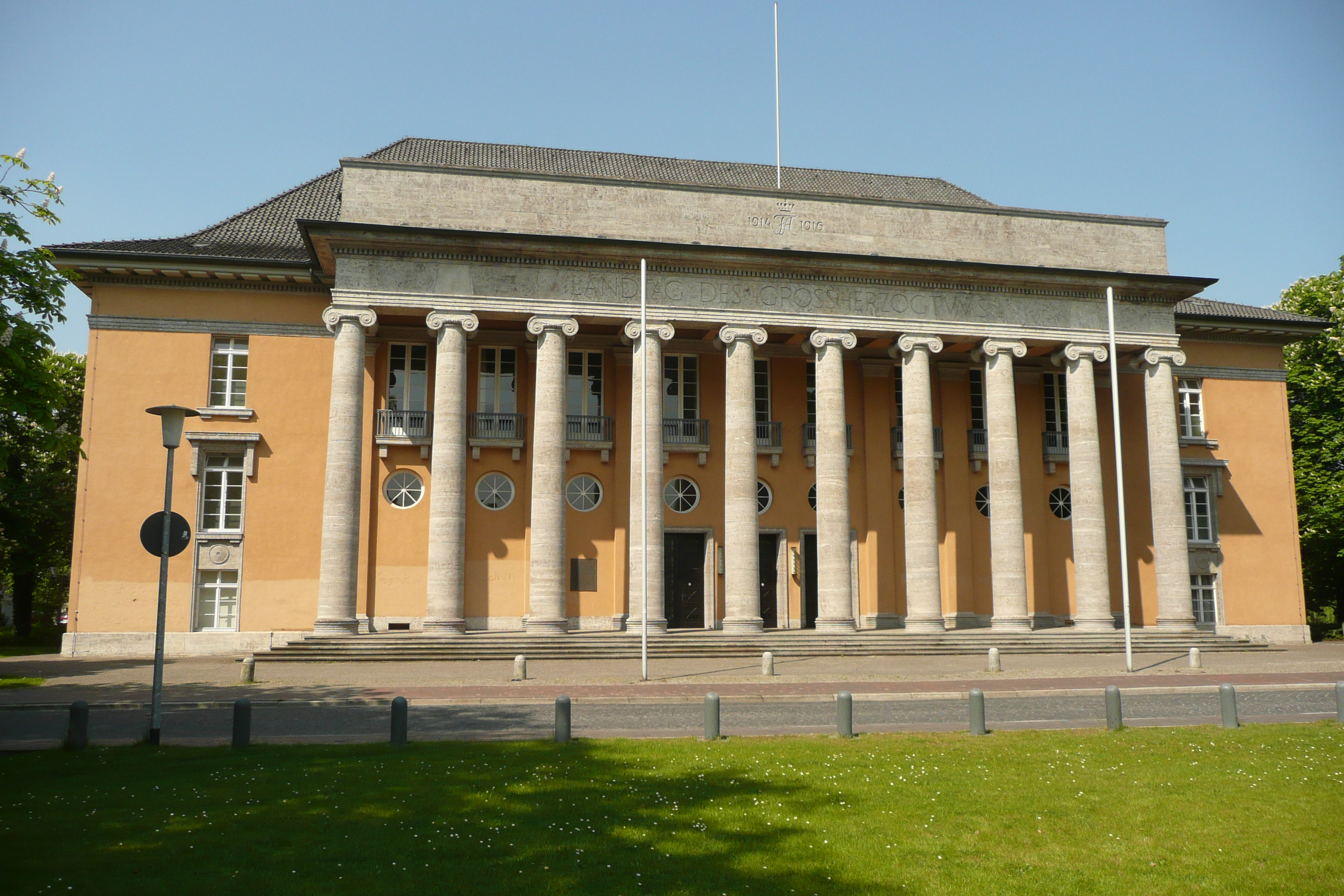
Oldenburg parliament building (German: Landtag)
