= Christian Adolf I of Schleswig-Holstein-Sonderburg-Franzhagen =

Christian Adolf I, Duke of Schleswig-Holstein-Sonderburg-Franzhagen
- Born: 3 June 1641; Sønderborg
- Died: 2 January 1702 (aged 60); Hamburg
- Noble family: House of Oldenburg
- Spouse: Eleonore Charlotte of Saxony-Lauenburg
- Father: John Christian, Duke of Schleswig-Holstein-Sonderburg
- Mother: Anna of Oldenburg-Delmenhorst

Christian Adolf I, Duke of Schleswig-Holstein-Sonderburg-Franzhagen (3 June 1641 – 2 January 1702) was a German nobleman and Duke of Schleswig-Holstein-Sonderburg-Franzhagen.

== Early life ==
He was the second son of Duke Johann Christian of Schleswig-Holstein-Sonderburg and his wife, and Countess Anna of Oldenburg-Delmenhorst.

== Biography ==
When he was 8 years old, his older brother, John Frederick, died, making him heir to his father's estate. On his father's death in 1653, he inherited his father's small duchy, only for it to go bankrupt in 1667 and be returned to the Danish Crown.

In 1676, he married Eleonore Charlotte of Saxony-Lauenburg, granddaughter of Francis II, Duke of Saxe-Lauenburg. Christian Adolf obtained the estate Franzhagen from the marriage, and from here he started the brief Schleswig-Holstein-Sonderburg-Franzhagen line. The couple had three sons:

- Christian Leopold, Duke of Schleswig-Holstein-Sonderburg-Franzhagen (25 August 1678 – 13 July 1707)
- Louis Charles, Duke of Schleswig-Holstein-Sonderburg-Franzhagen (4 June 1684 – 11 October 1708) — his son, Christian Adolf II, inherited the lands as a small child and was the last to hold the title.
- John Francis (30 July 1685 – 22 January 1687)

He died on 2 January 1702 in Hamburg, and his line would end with the death of his grandson Christian Adolf II.

Christian Adolf I of Schleswig-Holstein-Sonderburg-Franzhagen House of Oldenburg Born: 3 June 1641 Died: 2 January 1702
Preceded by First to hold the title	Duke of Schleswig-Holstein-Sonderburg-Franzhagen; 1676-1702	Succeeded by Christian Leopold
Preceded by John Christian	Duke of Schleswig-Holstein-Sonderburg; 1653-1668	Succeeded by Title goes bankrupt
