= Hildebold =

Hildebold (also spelled Hiltebold, Hiltbold, Hiltbolt or Hildebald) may refer to:

- Hiddi, born Hildebold (died c. 813), Saxon nobleman
- Hildebold of Cologne (died 818), bishop of Cologne
- Hildebold (bishop of Münster) (died 969), bishop of Münster
- Hildebold (bishop of Worms) (died 998), bishop of Worms
- Hiltebold (bishop of Gurk) (died 1131), bishop of Gurk
- Hiltbolt von Schwangau (1221–1254), lyric poet whose work is in the Codex Manesse
- Hildebold of Wunstorf (died 1273), archbishop of Bremen
- Hiltbold von Werstein (died 1329), abbot of Saint Gall
