= Schleswig-Holstein-Sonderburg-Franzhagen =

Family

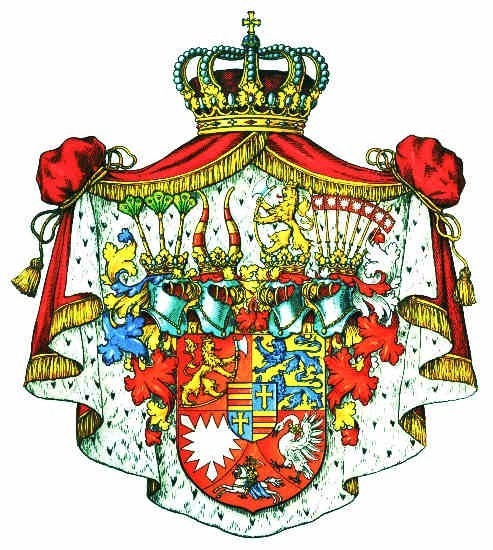
Arms of the Dukes of Schleswig-Holstein

The Schleswig-Holstein-Sonderburg-Franzhagen line was a short-lived name of the main line of the ducal house of Schleswig-Holstein-Sonderburg, after its bankruptcy in 1667. The main line of the family was also a cadet branch of the House of Oldenburg, ruling family of the Kingdom of Denmark.

The name is derived from the Franzhagen Castle in Schulendorf, in the Duchy of Saxe-Lauenburg.

The castle was inherited by Eleonore Charlotte of Saxe-Lauenburg-Franzhagen, who brought it into her marriage with former Duke Christian Adolph I.

After their bankruptcy, the Sonderburg line was reduced to its possession of Franzhagen. After the extinction of the Schleswig-Holstein-Sonderburg-Franzhagen branch, the Franzhagen castle was demolished in 1716, because it was too dilapidated.

== List of Dukes ==
Reign	Name	Remarks
1676–1702	Christian Adolf I	Former Duke of Schleswig-Holstein-Sonderburg, was declared bankrupt in 1667, the former headquarters Sonderburg Castle went to the Danish crown. In 1676, he married Eleonore Charlotte of Saxe-Lauenburg-Franzhagen, who brought eponymous castle Franzhagen into the marriage.
1702–1707	Christian Leopold	Son, married Anna Sophia Segelke morganatically, therefore, his children could not inherit his real estate
1707–1708	Louis Charles	Brother, married Anna Barbara Dorothea of Winterfeld morganatically. His children were ennobled, allowing them to inherit the castle.
1708–1709	Christian Adolf II	Underage son and heir. With him, the line died out.

The real power of government from 1702 was wielded by Eleonore Charlotte of Saxe-Lauenburg-Franzhagen, the widow of Christian Adolf I, as the sons had married beneath their station. Anna Barbara Dorothea of Winterfeld never owned more than a house in Billwerder, until her death in 1739.

== See also ==
- House of Oldenburg
