= John II of Oldenburg =

German noble (died c. 1314 or 1316)

Count of Oldenburg
- Reign: 1272 - c. 1301
- Predecessor: Christian III, Count of Oldenburg
- Successor: John III, Count of Oldenburg
- Died: c. 1314/1316
- Noble family: House of Oldenburg
- Spouses: Elisabeth of Brunswick-Lunenburg; Hedwig of Diepholz
- Issue: Christian IV; John III; Conrad I Maurice of Oldenburg; Gisela, Countess of Hoya
- Father: Christian III, Count of Oldenburg
- Mother: Hedwig von Oldenburg or Jutta of Bentheim

John II, Count of Oldenburg (German: Johann II. Graf von Oldenburg; died c. 1314 or 1316) was Count of Oldenburg from 1275 until around 1301. He was the son of Christian III, Count of Oldenburg. His mother was either Hedwig von Oldenburg in Wildeshausen or Jutta of Bentheim.

== Marriages and issue ==
John married twice. His first marriage was to Elisabeth, the daughter of John, Duke of Brunswick-Lüneburg and Liutgard von Holstein-Itzehoe. His second marriage was to Countess Hedwig of Diepholz. John had five children:

- Christian IV, Count of Oldenburg (de)
- John III, Count of Oldenburg (de), married Mechtild (Matilda) of Bronckhorst
- Conrad I, Count of Oldenburg
- Maurice of Oldenburg (de), (killed in action in 1368 near Blexen), Dean (Domdechant) of Bremen Cathedral, Diocesan Administrator of the Archdiocese of Bremen (1345–1362), Archbishop Elect of Bremen (1348, papally refused) and coadjutor of Bremen (1348–1360)
- Gisela of Oldenburg; married Gerhard III, Count of Hoya (de)

John II of Oldenburg House of Oldenburg Died: 1314 or 1316
Regnal titles
Preceded by Christian III	Count of Oldenburg; 1275–1301/05	Succeeded by Christian IV with John III
