= Louis Charles, Duke of Schleswig-Holstein-Sonderburg-Franzhagen =

- Born: 4 June 1684
- Died: 11 October 1707 (aged 23)
- Noble family: House of Oldenburg
- Spouse: Anna Barbara Dorothea of Winterfeld
- Father: Christian Adolf I, Duke of Schleswig-Holstein-Sonderburg-Franzhagen
- Mother: Eleonore Charlotte of Saxe-Lauenburg-Franzhagen

Louis Charles, Duke of Schleswig-Holstein-Sonderburg-Franzhagen (4 June 1684 – 11 October 1707) was a German nobleman and ruler from the House of Schleswig-Holstein-Sonderburg, cadet line of the House of Oldenburg.

== Early life ==
Louis Charles was the second son of Duke Christian Adolph of Schleswig-Holstein-Sonderburg-Franzhagen and Duchess Eleonore Charlotte of Saxe-Lauenburg.

== Succession ==
In 1707, Louis succeeded his elder brother Leopold Christian as Duke of Schleswig-Holstein-Sonderburg-Franzhagen. However, he died later that year.

== Marriage and children ==
In 1705, Louis married Anna Barbara Dorothea von Winterfeld (1670-1739) in Ottensen, near Hamburg. She was the daughter of Barthold Dietrich von Winterfeld and Sophie Margarete von Warnstedt. Although she belonged to lower nobility, their marriage was recognized as equal and their children thus had succession rights and were able to inherit the Duchy. They had:

- Eleonore Charlotte (2 September 1706 – 9 February 1708)
- Christian Adolph II (16 September 1707 – 26 March 1709)

His son Christian succeeded as Christian II Adolph, Duke of Schleswig-Holstein-Sonderburg-Franzhagen. As he was still a minor, he reigned under the regency. With his death in 1709, the Schleswig-Holstein-Sonderburg-Franzhagen line died out.

== Bibliography ==
- Stokvis, Anthony Marinus Hendrik Johan (1890–93). Manuel d'histoire, de généalogie et de chronologie de tous les États du globe, depuis les temps les plus reculés jusqu'à nos jours (E.J. Brill Leide ed.).

Louis Charles, Duke of Schleswig-Holstein-Sonderburg-Franzhagen House of Oldenburg Born: 4 June 1684 Died: 11 October 1707
Preceded by Leopold Christian	Duke of Schleswig-Holstein-Sonderburg-Franzhagen; 1707-1707	Succeeded by Christian Adolph
