= Treaty of Tsarskoye Selo =

1773 treaty between Russia and Denmark–Norway

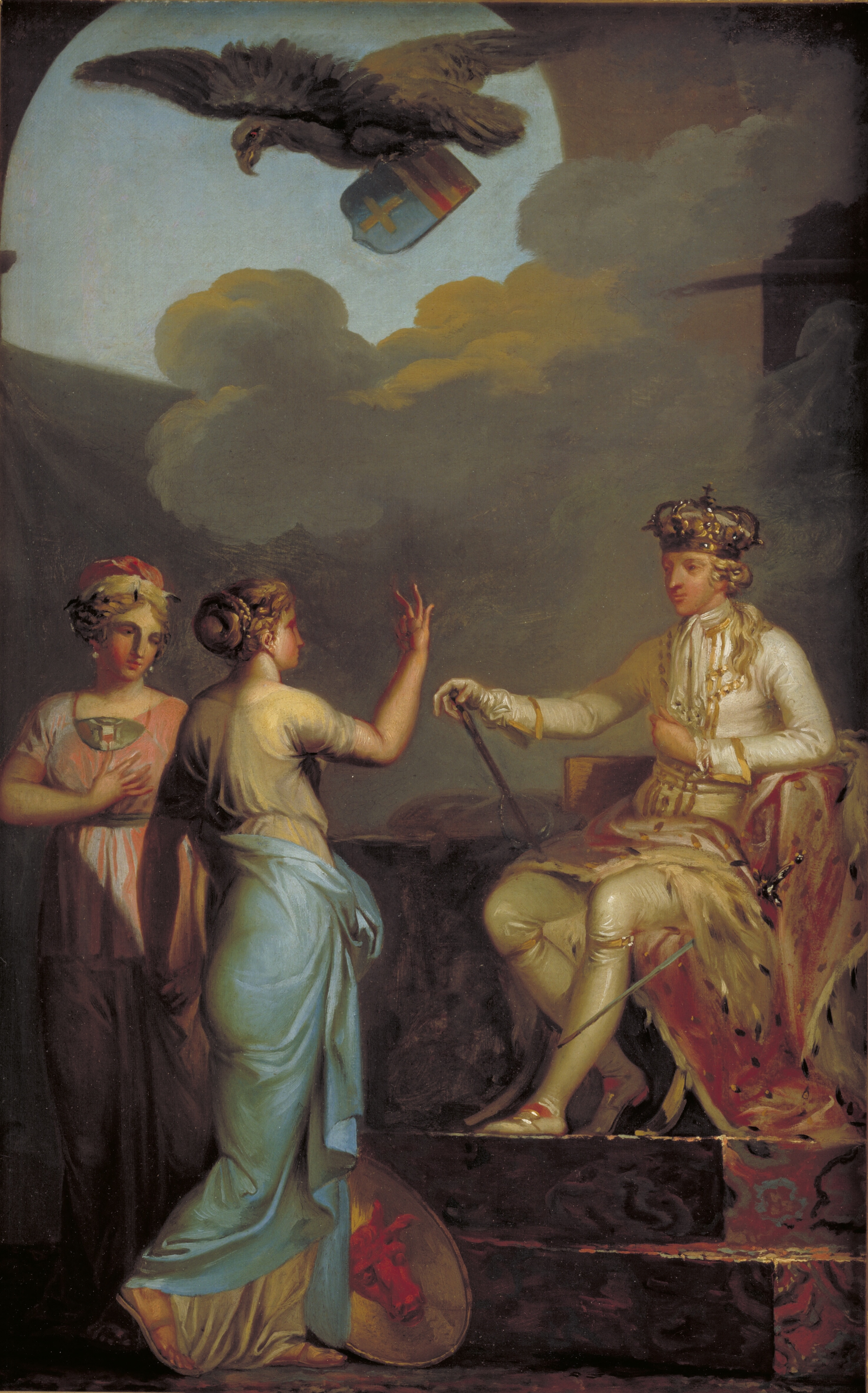
- Christian VII Uniting the Ducal with the Royal Part of Holstein in 1773
- Context: Peter III of Russia's territory in Holstein-Gottorp and claims in Schleswig
- Drafted: 1767
- Signed: 1 June 1773
- Location: Tsarskoye Selo, Russia
- Negotiators: Caspar von Saldern (Russia); Andreas Peter Bernstorff (Denmark–Norway)
- Signatories: Grand Duke Paul of Russia; Christian VII of Denmark
- Parties: Russian Empire; Denmark–Norway

The Treaty of Tsarskoye Selo (Danish: Traktaten i Zarskoje Selo, Russian: Царскосельский договор) also called Mageskiftetraktaten in Danish, was a territorial and dynastic treaty between the Russian Empire and Denmark–Norway. Signed on 1 June 1773, it transferred control of ducal Schleswig-Holstein to the Danish crown in return for Russian control of the County of Oldenburg and adjacent lands within the Holy Roman Empire. The treaty reduced the fragmentation of Danish territory and led to an alliance between Denmark–Norway and Russia that lasted into the Napoleonic Wars. It also made possible the construction of the Eider Canal, parts of which were later incorporated into the Kiel Canal.

== Historical background ==
=== Oldenburg and Delmenhorst ===
In 1448 the Count of Oldenburg was elected King of Denmark and took the throne as Christian I. He assigned Oldenburg to his brother, Gerhard, in 1454, and Gerhard's descendants in the House of Oldenburg continued to rule the county for the next two centuries. In 1547 Emperor Charles V also gave the counts of Oldenburg control of the town of Delmenhorst, which adjoins Oldenburg on the left bank of the Weser, in return for Oldenburg's support in the Schmalkaldic War. When the last count of Oldenburg, Anthony Günther, died childless in 1667, these territories reverted to the kings of Denmark, who began to rule them in personal union.

=== Schleswig-Holstein ===
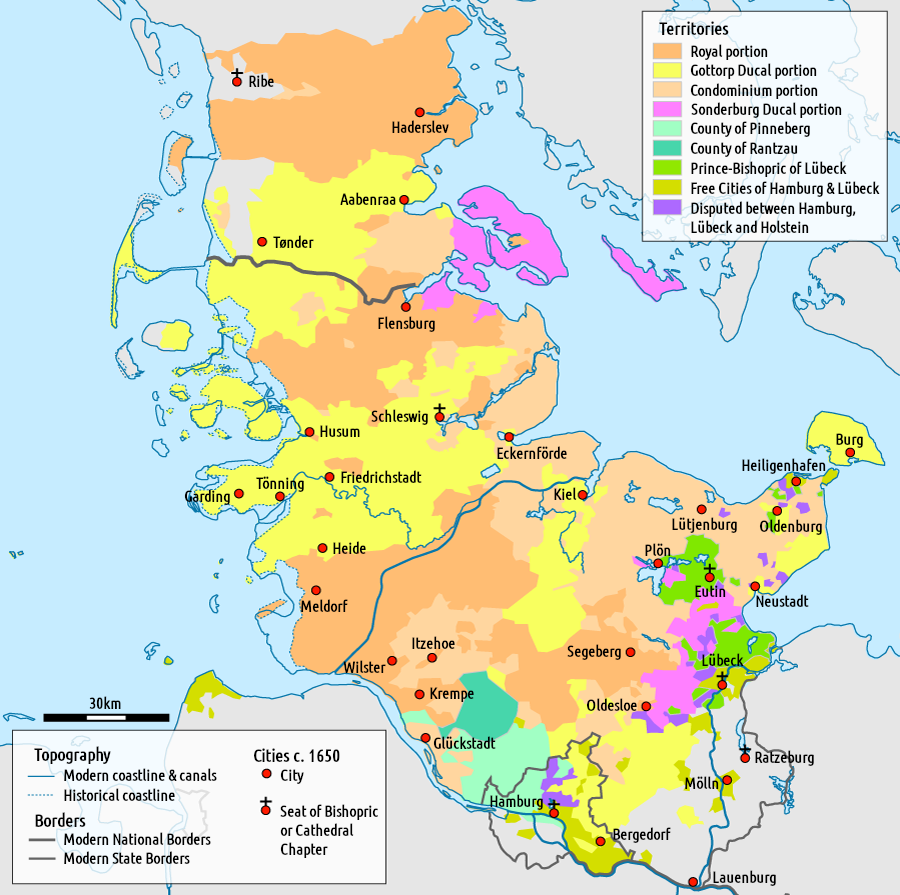
Territorial borders in Schleswig-Holstein c.1650 (with royal holdings in orange and ducal holdings in yellow), showing the region's extreme fragmentation

In 1460, upon his election as Duke of Holstein, King Christian I promulgated the Treaty of Ribe, affirming that Schleswig (a Danish fief) and Holstein (part of the Holy Roman Empire) were to remain "forever undivided" in return for his recognition by the region's noble estates as the rightful ruler of Schleswig-Holstein. From that time forward, Denmark and Schleswig-Holstein were ruled in personal union by the Danish kings for nearly a century. Then, in 1544 King Christian III of Denmark partitioned the two duchies between himself and his two half-brothers, John and Adolf, in an unusual way that would shape Danish politics for centuries.

Schleswig-Holstein's noble estates remained opposed to the actual division of the region, so the revenues of the duchies were divided into three equal shares by assigning the revenues of particular areas and landed estates to particular brothers. The piecemeal assignment of the estates left Holstein and Schleswig with a patchwork of political boundaries, precluding any future separation of the regions, as intended by the estates. The rule in the duchies thus became a condominium of the king and the two dukes. Duke John died childless, and his share in the region was divided between his brothers' lines, but Duke Adolf's descendants in the House of Holstein-Gottorp, who ruled not only the ducal share of Schleswig-Holstein but also the Prince-Bishopric of Lübeck, became rivals to the Danish kings.

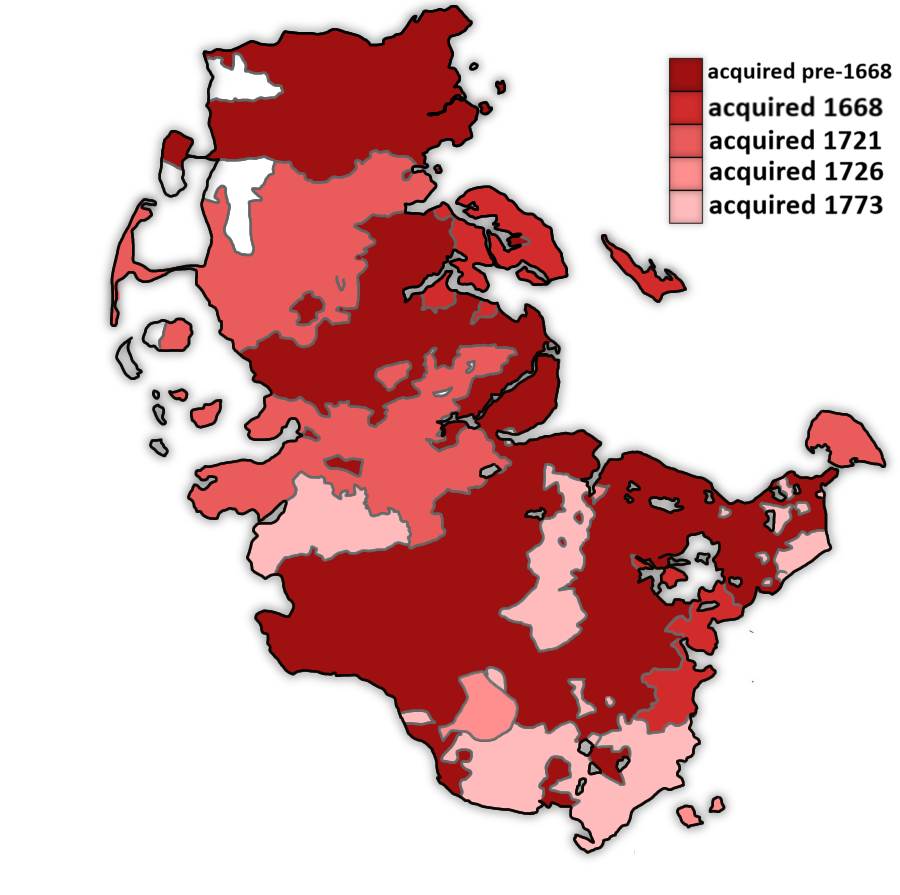
Danish Unification process of Holstein

=== Gottorp Question ===
By the mid-17th century the so-called "Gottorp Question" of Holstein's relationship with the crown threatened the stability of the Danish kingdom, as the dukes of Holstein-Gottorp allied themselves with Sweden and other foreign powers against Denmark–Norway. During the minority of Charles Frederick, Duke of Holstein-Gottorp, Schleswig-Holstein's government affairs were entrusted to Minister Georg Heinrich von Görtz, who supported Sweden in the Great Northern War; in that war's aftermath, Denmark–Norway seized the Duke's territory in Schleswig and ended Sweden's patronage of Holstein-Gottorp with the 1720 Treaty of Frederiksborg.

Duke Charles Frederick sought support for the recovery of Schleswig in Russia, and in 1725 he married Russian Princess Anna Petrovna, the daughter of Emperor Peter the Great and sister of the future Empress Elizabeth. In 1742 the childless Elizabeth appointed her nephew, Charles Peter Ulrich (Charles Frederick and Anna's son), to be her successor in Russia. After her death in 1762, this Duke of Holstein ascended the throne as Peter III of Russia; Ducal Holstein was now ruled in personal union by the Emperor of Russia. With the resources of Russia now backing his claims, Peter dispatched his minister Caspar von Saldern to the Danish court to demand the recovery of his former ducal territory in Schleswig, as well as the concession of the royal portion of Holstein, under threat of war.

== Negotiations ==
At the time of Peter's accession Russia was already fighting in the Third Silesian War theatre of the Seven Years' War, but he quickly made peace with Prussia and directed troops into Pomerania to press his claims against Denmark–Norway. The Danish government under Johann Hartwig Ernst von Bernstorff refused to relinquish Schleswig, and Russian and Danish troops came face to face in Mecklenburg; but, on 9 July 1762, before fighting began or any agreement could be reached, Peter was overthrown by his wife, who took control of Russia as Empress Catherine II.

Catherine reversed Russia's stance, withdrawing her husband's ultimatum and even entering a non-aggression pact with Denmark–Norway on 11 March 1765. She transferred the Duchy of Holstein to her minor son, Grand Duke Paul (later Emperor Paul I of Russia), and instructed her representative, Caspar von Saldern, to negotiate a peaceful solution to the Schleswig-Holstein conflict with his Danish counterpart, Foreign Minister Andreas Peter Bernstorff. The negotiators reached a provisional agreement in 1767.

Grand Duke Paul would renounce the House of Romanov's claims in Schleswig-Holstein and transfer the ducal lands in Holstein to King Christian VII of Denmark–Norway, ending the Duchy of Holstein-Gottorp; in return, Denmark would reaffirm its alliance with Russia, pay a sizeable indemnity, and give Paul control of the County of Oldenburg and other hereditary Oldenburg lands in the Holy Roman Empire. The agreement was accepted by Catherine in 1767; after he came of age, Grand Duke Paul ratified the treaty on 1 June 1773 at the Russian imperial family's residence in Tsarskoye Selo, south of Saint Petersburg, together with Danish King Christian VII. On 12 August Russia and Denmark signed a further treaty of alliance against Sweden, and the bargain was complete.

== Results ==
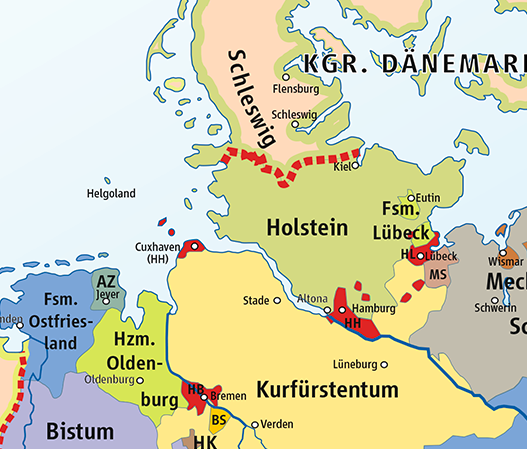
The duchies of Schleswig, Holstein and Oldenburg c.1789, showing the outcome of the treaty

This territorial exchange placed the duchies of Schleswig and Holstein under a single sovereign, the Danish king, and ended the political and dynastic conflicts that had divided the region since its partition two centuries earlier. The political unification of Schleswig–Holstein made possible the development of the Eider Canal, whose construction began the following year.

The establishment of full, direct control over this strategically significant borderland strengthened Denmark's geopolitical position considerably and marked a major step toward Denmark's emergence as a centralised, unitary state. The alliance which shortly followed (contemporaneously called the "Eternal Alliance" (Danish: Den Evige Alliance)) tied Denmark's foreign policy to Russia's and led directly to Danish-Norwegian involvement in the Theatre War of 1788–1789 and the Dano-Swedish War of 1808–09.

On the Russian side, the exchange allowed Catherine to turn Denmark–Norway from an enemy into an ally, furthering Nikita Ivanovich Panin's policy of building a Northern Accord to balance the power of Bourbon France; a stronger Denmark would also help to contain Sweden (Russia's chief rival in the Baltic Sea region). In 1774, Grand Duke Paul (at the urging of his mother) transferred the German lands obtained from the exchange to his great-uncle, Frederick August, and in 1777 they were united within a newly declared Duchy of Oldenburg. The Duchy of Oldenburg would remain connected to the Russian Empire until its annexation by Napoleon's French Empire in 1810.

== See also ==
- Denmark–Russia relations
- History of Schleswig-Holstein
