= Augustenborg Palace =

Rococo-style palace in Augustenborg, Als Island, Denmark

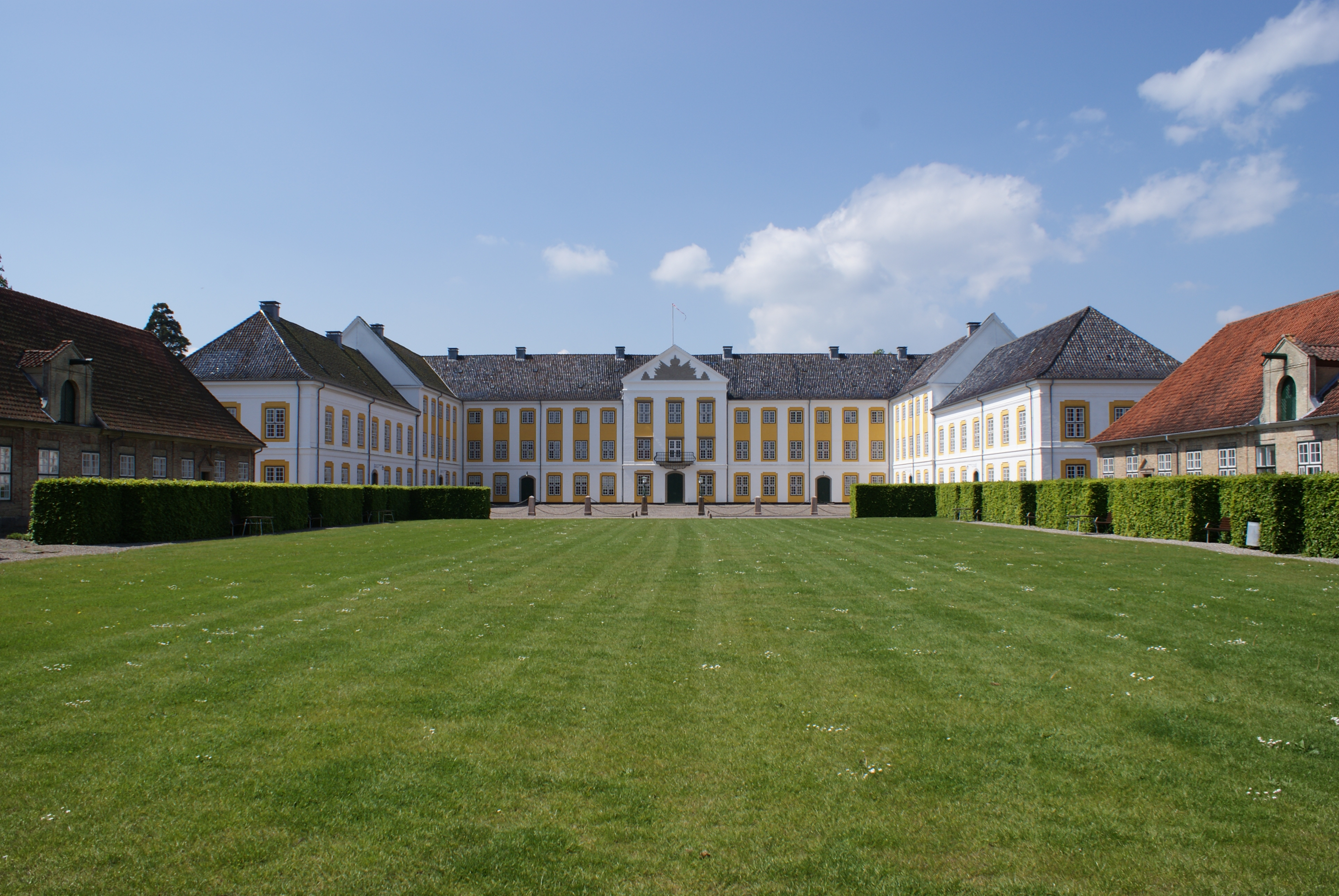
- Augustenburg Palace, courtyard view

- Location within Denmark

General information
- Architectural style: Rococo-style
- Location: Augustenborg, Als Island, Sønderborg Municipality, Region of Southern Denmark, Denmark
- Coordinates: 54°56′40″N 9°51′59″E
- Construction started: 1660–1664
- Renovated: Late 1770s, 1920s

Augustenborg Palace (or Augustenborg Castle; Danish: Augustenborg Slot, German: Schloss Augustenburg) is a Rococo-style palace in the southwestern part of Augustenborg, Als Island, Denmark, overlooking Augustenborg Fjord. The palace owes its name to Duchess Auguste (1633–1701). Augustenborg gave its name to the House of Schleswig-Holstein-Sonderburg-Augustenburg, the last member of which was Duke Christian August II (1798–1869).

== History ==
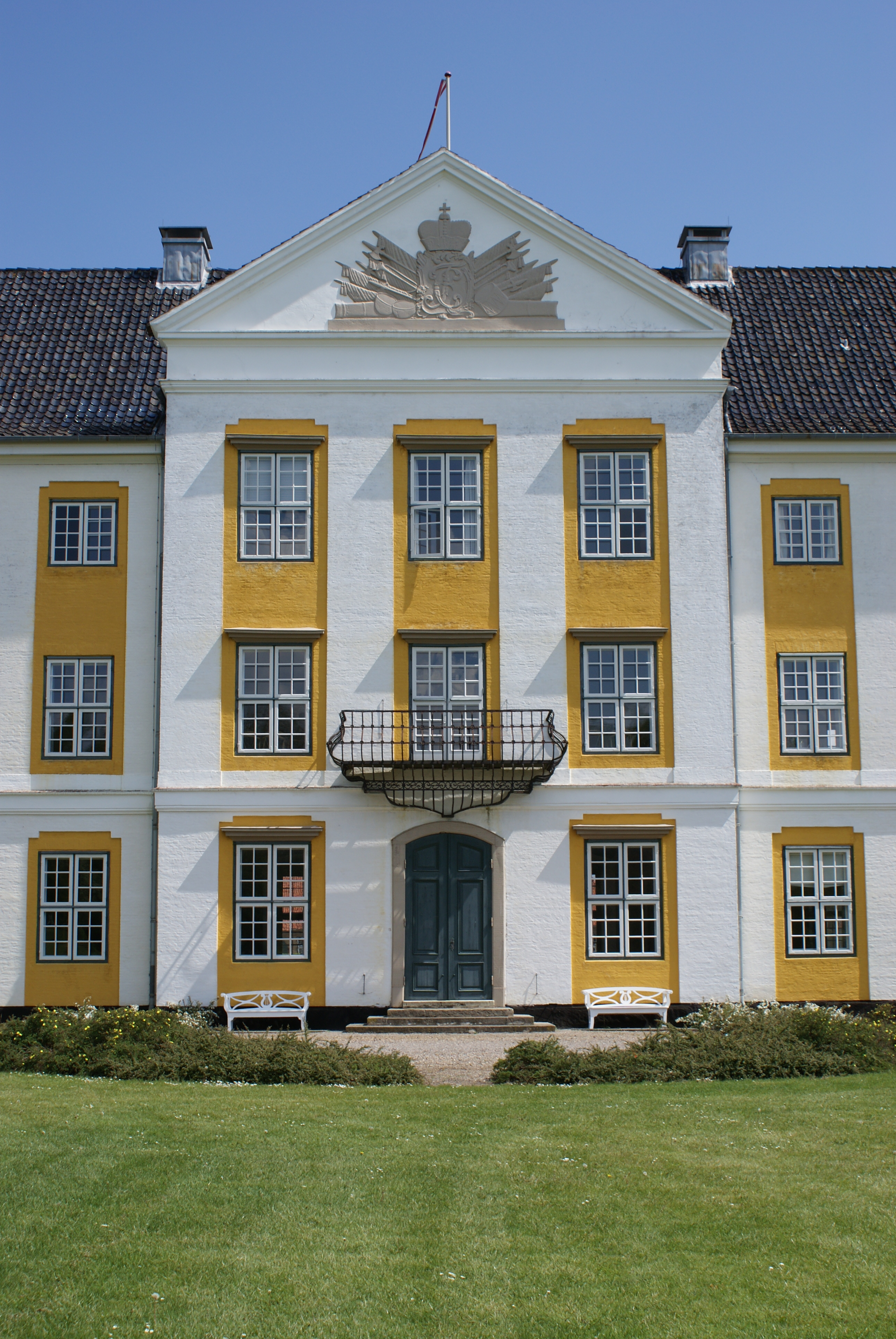
Facade

The original half-timbered manor house was built in 1660–4 by Ernest Günther, the first Duke of Augustenborg, after he bought the village of Stavensbøl and demolished it for the land. The one-storey, red-roofed buildings around the outer courtyard were added from 1733 while the main three-winged building, replacing the original manor, was built from 1770 to 1776 in full symmetry, a fine example of Baroque architecture.

With its yellow-painted walls and blue-tiled roof, the wings gradually increase in height up to the central section. The three central bays of the facade protrude as an avant-corps three storeys high. Inside a beautiful entrance hall was finished in white-painted stucco by the Italian decorator Michel Angelo Taddei (1755–1831). Taddei also worked on the interior of the two-storey Baroque chapel in the building's northern wing, adding a Rococo altarpiece with an integrated pulpit as well as decorations along the vaults and walls of the nave. During the same period, much of the town was regenerated. The palace building underwent further renovation in the 1920s. Hans Christian Andersen spent two weeks at the palace in the autumn of 1844 and wrote The Little Match Girl when he visited the castle.

During the First Schleswig War (1848–50), Christian August II, the last duke to live in the palace, left Augustenborg as a result of his close relations with Germany. Thereafter the building was first used as a barracks and from 1878 as a seminary for women.

In 1921, Augustenborg was purchased by the Danish state. It was fitted out as a hospital in 1927–28 and since 1932 has been used as a psychiatric hospital. There is an exhibit about the palace, the town and its ducal history in the building's entryway.

== Church ==
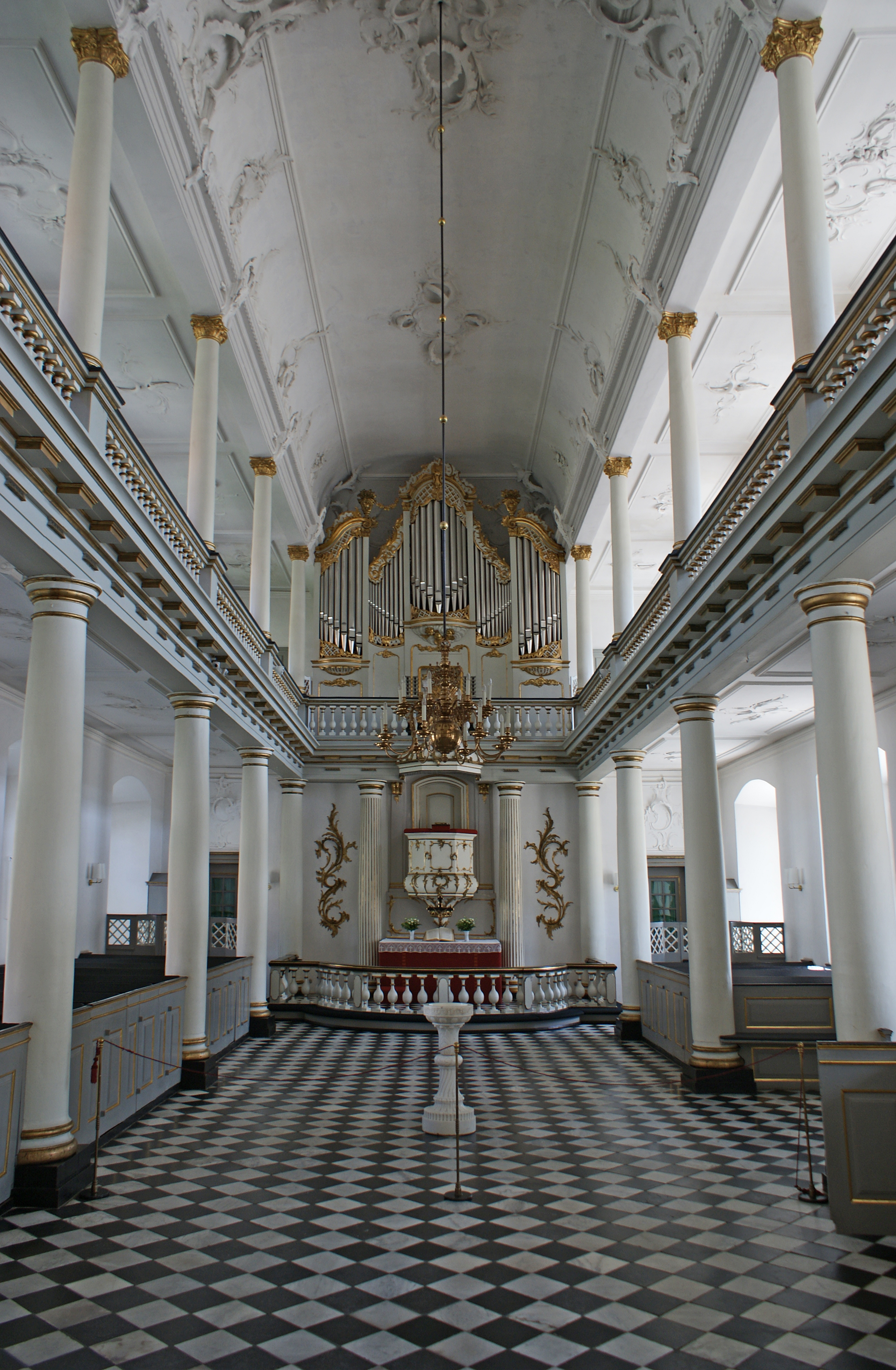
The church of Augustenborg Palace.

The largest room in the castle is the church hall, which dates from the late 18th century. Not visible from the outside, it covers the entire two-storey annexe of the north wing and is the successor of an older chapel, from 1671, which was demolished before the construction of the castle. The hall, which has served as the parish church of the town since 1874, was extensively restored in 1972.

The rococo architecture of the church hall is consistent with the rest of the building. The stucco work was probably designed by Michelangelo Taddei. The hall has seven divided window bays. Six Doric and six Corinthian columns separate the room, forming a three-aisled hall. A curved balustrade leads to the pulpit altar on the eastern wall. The organ is placed over the high altar and was built by the Holstein organ builder, Johann Daniel Busch. The Carrara marble baptismal font was a gift of the Russian Tsar Alexander I.

== Grounds ==
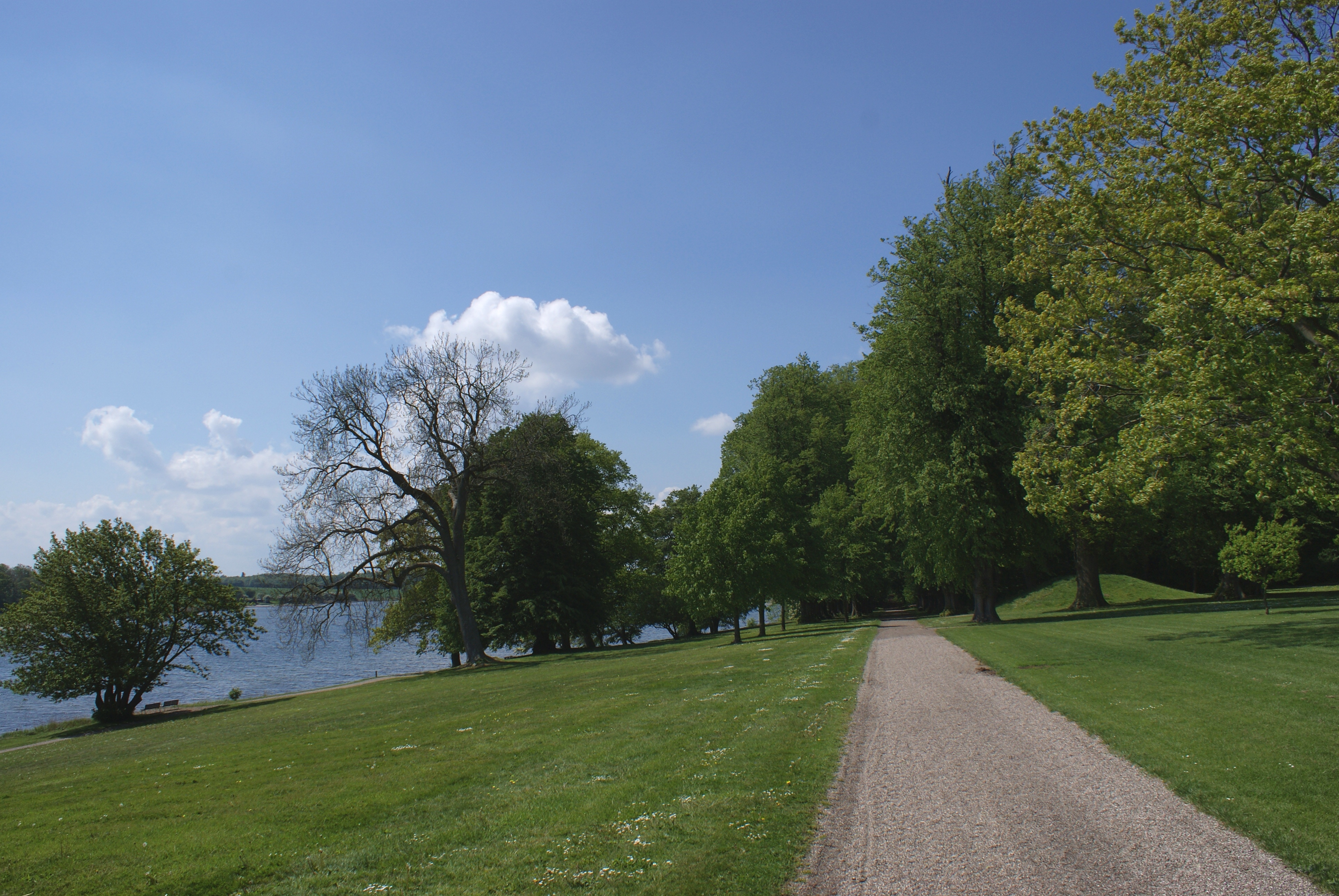
Palace grounds

The castle is situated directly above a bay of the Augustenburger Fjord, an arm of the Baltic Sea. The views of the bay and the landscape behind it appear to be a continuation of the garden in the distance. The grounds included a Baroque-style garden, which in the 19th century was transformed into a landscaped park. The garden includes large grass terraces and a shaped topiary hedge.

The garden area in front of the palace building is framed by trees and a sculpted hills, which is accessible by trails. Under one of the lindens in the castle grounds is a memorial plaque to the poet Andersen, who is said to have worked there for many of his stories. Within the park, there are two summer-houses and outbuildings, which after the departure of the ducal family in 1848, were converted to public use. The House of Prince is a small, relatively spartan-appearing house. It was built in 1765 for Emil August, the younger brother of Duke Frederick Christian I. The red house served as a hermitage for Emil August who lived there until his death in 1786. The small estate was bequeathed to his sister, Christine Louise Caroline, for use in her lifetime. The palace church, which now serves as the parish church of Augustenborg, is open to the public in the summer months. Tours of the ducal apartments can be arranged by appointment.
