= Schulendorf =

- Municipality
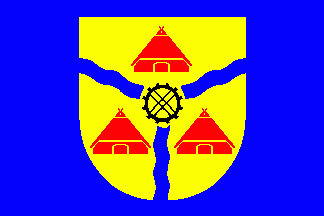
- Flag Coat of arms

- Location of Schulendorf within Herzogtum Lauenburg district
- Interactive map of Schulendorf
- Location within Germany Location within Schleswig-Holstein
- Coordinates: 53°28′N 10°34′E
- Country: Germany
- State: Schleswig-Holstein
- District: Herzogtum Lauenburg
- Municipal assoc.: Büchen

Government
  - Mayor: Herbert Schlottmann

Area
  - Total: 11.39 km^{2} (4.40 sq mi)
- Elevation: 31 m (102 ft)

Population (2025-12-31)
  - Total: 486
  - Density: 42.7/km^{2} (111/sq mi)
- Time zone: UTC+01:00 (CET)
  - Summer (DST): UTC+02:00 (CEST)
- Postal codes: 21516
- Dialling codes: 04151, 04155
- Vehicle registration: RZ
- Website: www.buechen.de

Schulendorf is a municipality in the district of Lauenburg, in Schleswig-Holstein, Germany.
