= Franzhagen Castle =

Coordinates: 53.471994°N 10.56977°E

- Franzgarten
- Near Schulendorf in Germany

Site information
- Type: Castle

Site history
- Built: Middle Ages
- Fate: Destroyed

The Franzhagen Castle, also known as Franzgarten or Franzhof, was a castle near the present-day Schulendorf in southern Schleswig-Holstein. Before its destruction in 1716 it was owned by the dukes of Schleswig-Holstein-Sonderburg.

The castle was based on an older structure that may have originated in the Middle Ages. Under Mary of Brunswick-Wolfenbüttel a grange was added in 1608, and her husband Duke Francis II of Saxe-Lauenburg expanded it into a large castle with extensive gardens. The duke ran out of funds during the construction, so that, according to a local legend, the workers were left behind unpaid. Francis II lived in the castle until his death in 1619. After his death, it was inherited by his son-in-law Philip of Schleswig-Holstein-Sonderburg-Glücksburg. After Philip's death, the castle passed his nephew, John Christian, whose son Christian Adolph founded the short-lived family branch named after the castle, the Schleswig-Holstein-Sonderburg-Franzhagen line.

Early in the 18th century, the castle had to be demolished because it was too dilapidated. Nothing remains of the building itself; the only reminder of its existence is a street named Hofgraben ("court moat"), at the edge of the former castle district. Some of the furnishings of the chapel (which was also demolished), found their way into the St. Mary's Church in neighbouring Büchen.
