= Frederick Christian II of Schleswig-Holstein-Sonderburg-Augustenburg =

Frederick Christian II
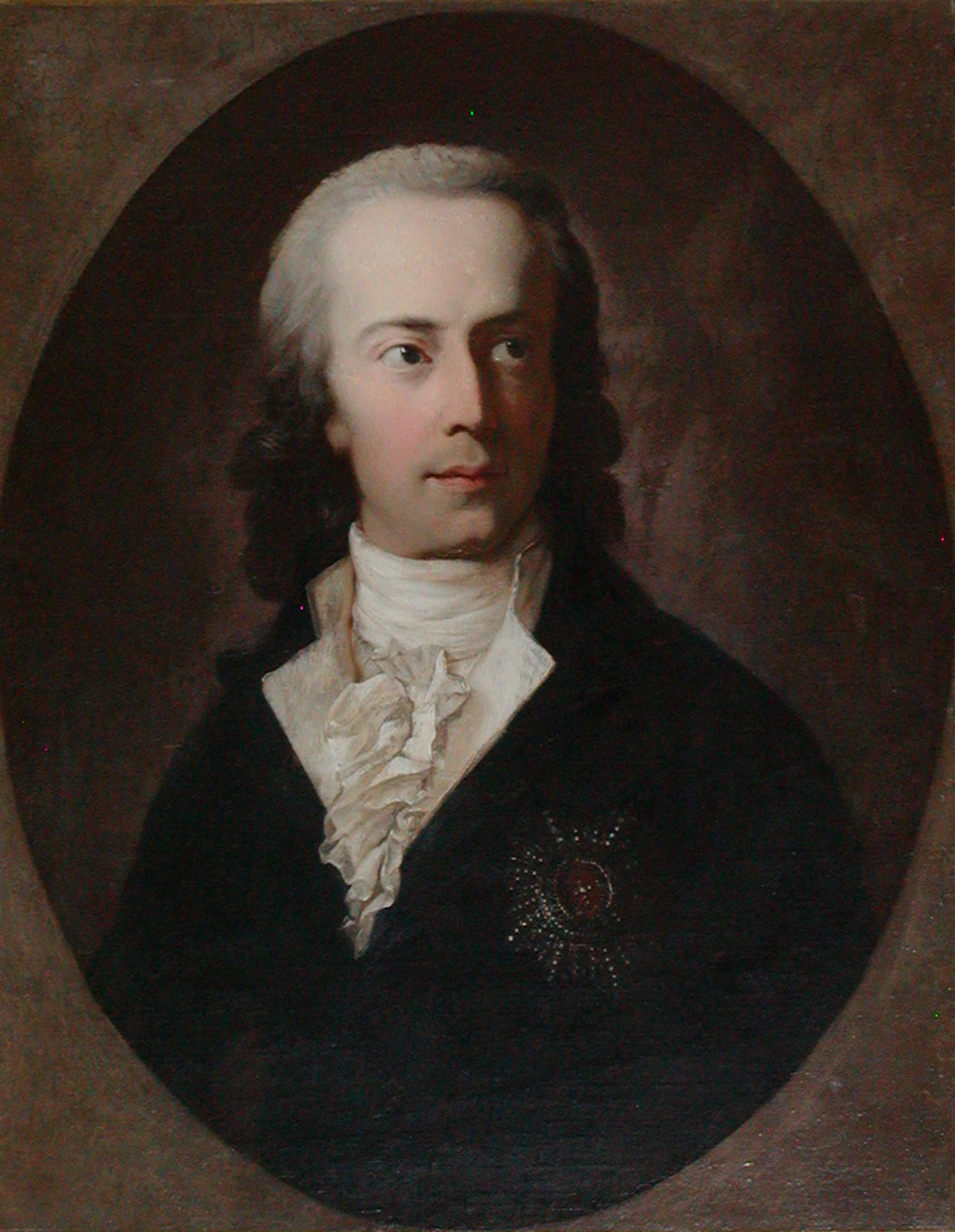

Duke of Schleswig-Holstein-Sonderburg-Augustenburg
- Reign: 13 November 1794 – 14 June 1814
- Predecessor: Frederick Christian I
- Successor: Christian August II
- Born: 28 September 1765; Augustenborg Palace, Schleswig
- Died: 14 June 1814 (aged 48); Augustenborg Palace, Schleswig
- Burial: Sønderborg Castle
- Spouse: Princess Louise Augusta of Denmark (m. 1786)
- Issue: Caroline Amalie, Queen of Denmark; Christian August II; Frederick, Prince of Noer
- House: Schleswig-Holstein-Sonderburg-Augustenburg
- Father: Frederick Christian I, Duke of Schleswig-Holstein-Sonderburg-Augustenburg
- Mother: Charlotte Amalie Wilhelmine of Schleswig-Holstein-Sonderburg-Plön

Frederick Christian II, Duke of Schleswig-Holstein-Sonderburg-Augustenburg (28 September 1765 – 14 June 1814) was a Danish prince and feudal magnate. He held the island of Als and some other castles (such as Sønderborg) in Schleswig.

== Early life ==
Frederick Christian II was born the eldest son of Frederick Christian I, Duke of Schleswig-Holstein-Sonderburg-Augustenburg, and his wife and cousin Princess Charlotte of Schleswig-Holstein-Sonderburg-Plön. Until his father's death, he was styled "Hereditary Prince of Augustenborg".

He was a prince with an exceptionally high level of Danish blood in his ancestry: his maternal grandmother, paternal grandmother, and paternal great-grandmother having been born, respectively, Countess of Reventlow, Countess of Danneskiold-Samsøe, and Countess of Ahlefeldt-Langeland. He was closely related to all important families of the Danish high nobility of the time. The negative side was that his ancestry was rather too much "comital" and too little royal. Instead of including royal princesses and duchesses of small and large German states, as was customary with the Oldenburg royal family, their marriage connections had been mostly with the nobility (chiefly of Denmark). Thus, although they were undoubtedly the senior cadet line of the royal house of Denmark (Oldenburg), the family was regarded as a bit lower than the Ebenbürtige which the rulers of small Germany principalities thought to be the standard.

== Marriage ==
By marriage, however, Frederick Christian drew closer to his cousins, the Danish royal family. In 1786, the twenty-year-old hereditary prince married his distant cousin, the fourteen-year-old Louise Auguste of Denmark and Norway, purported daughter of Christian VII of Denmark by his wife, the late Queen Caroline Mathilde. Louise Auguste's father, the king, was a man with mental disabilities and, throughout his reign, effective control was in the hands of other people (ranging from his step-mother to his wife to his half-brother to various courtiers). The king's mental condition, and his unharmonious relationship with his wife, gave rise to speculation that Louise had been sired by someone other than him, and rumour awarded fatherhood to Johann Friedrich Struensee, the king's court physician and de facto regent of the country at the time of Louise's birth. Indeed, she was at times referred to as la petite Struensee.

The story of antecedents of the prince's marriage goes as follows: In February 1779, the nation's foremost statesman, Chief Minister Count Andreas Peter Bernstorff, hatched an ingenious plan for the young princess, something that often has been customary with a royal child suspected of not being sired by its nominal father but in its mother's illicit liaison: to marry such a child to another member of the royal house. Since a male child of hers could inherit the throne some day, it would be advantageous to arrange a marriage early, and to marry the "half-royal" back into the extended royal house, to the Hereditary Prince of Augustenborg. This plan had the positive effect of more closely connecting the Danish royal house’s two lines, the ruling House of Oldenborg and the cadet House of Augustenborg, thus not only discouraging any breakup of the kingdom but also forestalling the possibility of a foreigner gaining influence into Danish affairs through marriage with her. This would certainly happen, for instance, if Louise were to marry her closer relations, the Swedish royals. The danger of Louise Auguste marrying into the Swedish royal house (the latter danger was rather low, however: at that time, there were Swedish princes only twenty years or more her senior, and her first cousin, the future King Gustav IV Adolf of Sweden, had just been born when she already was seven).

Binding agreements were made as early as in 1780, when Frederick Christian was 15 and Louise was only 9 years old. Five years later, in the spring of 1785, the young Frederick Christian came to Copenhagen. The engagement was announced then, and a year later, on 27 May 1786, the wedding was celebrated at Christiansborg Palace.

The couple lived at the Castle for many years until the Christiansborg Palace fire of 1794 and the death of his father, the Duke of Augustenborg Frederick Christian I, at which point the prince inherited the estate and the duchy. After 1794, the couple lived during the summer on the island of Als and in Gråsten.

Over the years, conflict arose between Duke Frederick Christian II and Louise Auguste's brother, King Frederick VI of Denmark, especially over the relationship of the double-duchies of Schleswig-Holstein and the Duke's own small appanage around Sonderborg on the one hand and the Danish monarchy on the other. His wife remained loyal to the Danish royal house throughout these differences. The marriage eventually fell into acrimony and reproach, and Frederick Christian tried to legally limit Louise Auguste's influence over their children's futures.

== Issue ==
Frederick Christian and Louise Auguste had three children:

- Caroline Amalie (born 28 September 1796 in Copenhagen; died 9 March 1881), married 1815 Prince Christian Frederick of Denmark (died 1848), the future Christian VIII of Denmark and earlier, 1814, briefly proclaimed king of Norway before the Swedish conquest; became Queen of Denmark; she died childless in 1881, then the Queen Dowager of Denmark.
- Christian August II (born 19 July 1798 in Copenhagen; died 11 March 1869), the Duke of Holstein-Sonderburg-Augustenburg who was to become a pivotal figure in the Question of Schleswig-Holstein in the 1850s and 1860s; so as not to offend Danish national feelings, he was married in 1820 to a Danish relative, Countess of Danneskjold-Samsoe (Lovisa-Sophie Danneskjold-Samsøe, 1797–1867), a kinswoman of the kings of Denmark, belonging to a bastard branch of House of Oldenburg; Duke Christian sold his rights to the Duchy of Schleswig-Holstein to Denmark in aftermath of Treaty of London but later renounced his rights to the Duchy of Schleswig-Holstein in favor of his son Frederick August; he was the brother-in-law of King Christian VIII of Denmark, nephew of Frederick VI of Denmark, and father of, amongst others, Frederick August (Friedrich Christian August), Duke of Schleswig-Holstein-Sonderburg-Augustenburg (born 1829 in Augustenborg, he was nephew of the Danish king himself, after whose death in 1863 he claimed to succeed as Duke of Schleswig-Holstein; died in 1880, leaving one surviving son and a number of daughters).
- Frederick Emil August (born 23 August 1800 in Kiel; died 2 July 1865 in Bayreuth), the “Prince” of Nør (Noer); he was married in 1829 to Countess Henriette Danneskjold-Samsøe (1806–1858), sister of his brother's wife in 1864, he was created Prinz von Noer ("Prince of Noer"); he was father of:
  - Friedrich Christian Karl August (born in Gottorp in 1830; died in Noer in 1881), who married Carmelita Eisenblat; and
  - Luise Karoline Henriette Auguste, Graefin von Noer (born in Schleswig in 1836; died in 1866), who married Michael Vlangali-Handjeri, a relative of the conservative politician Nicolaus Handjery.

== Later life and death ==
In 1810, Frederik Christian's younger brother Charles August was chosen by the estates of the Swedish realm as that nation's crown prince, to succeed the elderly and childless King Charles XIII. Following Charles August's death in May 1810, Frederick Christian himself was the leading candidate to become the new heir to the Swedish throne. On 8 August 1810 he was elected crown prince by the estates. His election however, was reconsidered and withdrawn two weeks later and Jean-Baptiste Bernadotte, Marshal of France and Prince of Ponte Corvo, was elected instead.

Frederick Charles died on 14 June 1814. He was succeeded by his eldest son, Christian August II, then but sixteen years old. Louise Auguste took control of the Augustenborg estates and the children’s upbringing. The estates were turned over to the son and heir on his return from an extended foreign tour in 1820.

== Ancestry ==
Ancestors of Frederick Christian II of Schleswig-Holstein-Sonderburg-Augustenburg

16. Ernest Günther, Duke of Schleswig-Holstein-Sonderburg-Augustenburg
8. Prince Frederick William of Schleswig-Holstein-Sonderburg-Augustenburg
17. Princess Augusta of Schleswig-Holstein-Sonderburg-Glücksburg
4. Christian August, Duke of Schleswig-Holstein-Sonderburg-Augustenburg
18. Frederik, Count of Ahlefeldt-Langeland
9. Countess Sophie Amalie of Ahlefeldt-Langeland
19. Countess Marie Elisabeth of Leiningen-Dagsburg-Hartenburg
2. Frederick Christian I, Duke of Schleswig-Holstein-Sonderburg-Augustenburg
20. Christian V of Denmark
10. Christian Gyldenløve, Count Danneskiold-Samsøe
21. Sophie Amalie Moth
5. Countess Frederikke Louise Danneskiold-Samsøe
22. Ulrik Frederik Gyldenløve, Count Laurvig
11. Countess Charlotte Amalie Danneskiold-Laurvig
23. Countess Antoinette Augusta of Aldenburg
1. Frederick Christian II, Duke of Schleswig-Holstein-Sonderburg-Augustenborg
24. Augustus, Duke of Schleswig-Holstein-Sonderburg-Plön-Norburg
12. Prince Christian Charles of Schleswig-Holstein-Sonderburg-Plön-Norburg
25. Princess Elisabeth Charlotte of Anhalt-Harzgerode
6. Frederick Charles, Duke of Schleswig-Holstein-Sonderburg-Plön
26. Johann Franz von Aichelberg
13. Dorothea Christina von Aichelberg
27. Anne Sophie von Trautenburg
3. Princess Charlotte Amalie Wilhelmine of Schleswig-Holstein-Sonderburg-Plön
28. Conrad, Count Reventlow
14. Christian Ditlev, Count Reventlow
29. Anna Margrethe Gabel
7. Countess Christine Ermegaard Reventlow
30. Cay Bertram von Brockdorff
15. Benedikta Margarethe von Brockdorff
31. Hedwig von Rantzau

Frederick Christian II of Schleswig-Holstein-Sonderburg-Augustenburg House of Oldenburg Born: 28 September 1765 Died: 14 June 1814
Preceded by Frederick Christian I	Duke of Schleswig-Holstein-Sonderburg-Augustenburg; 1794–1814	Succeeded by Christian August II
