= Charles August, Crown Prince of Sweden =

Danish-born heir to the Swedish throne (1768–1810)

Charles August
- Crown Prince of Sweden
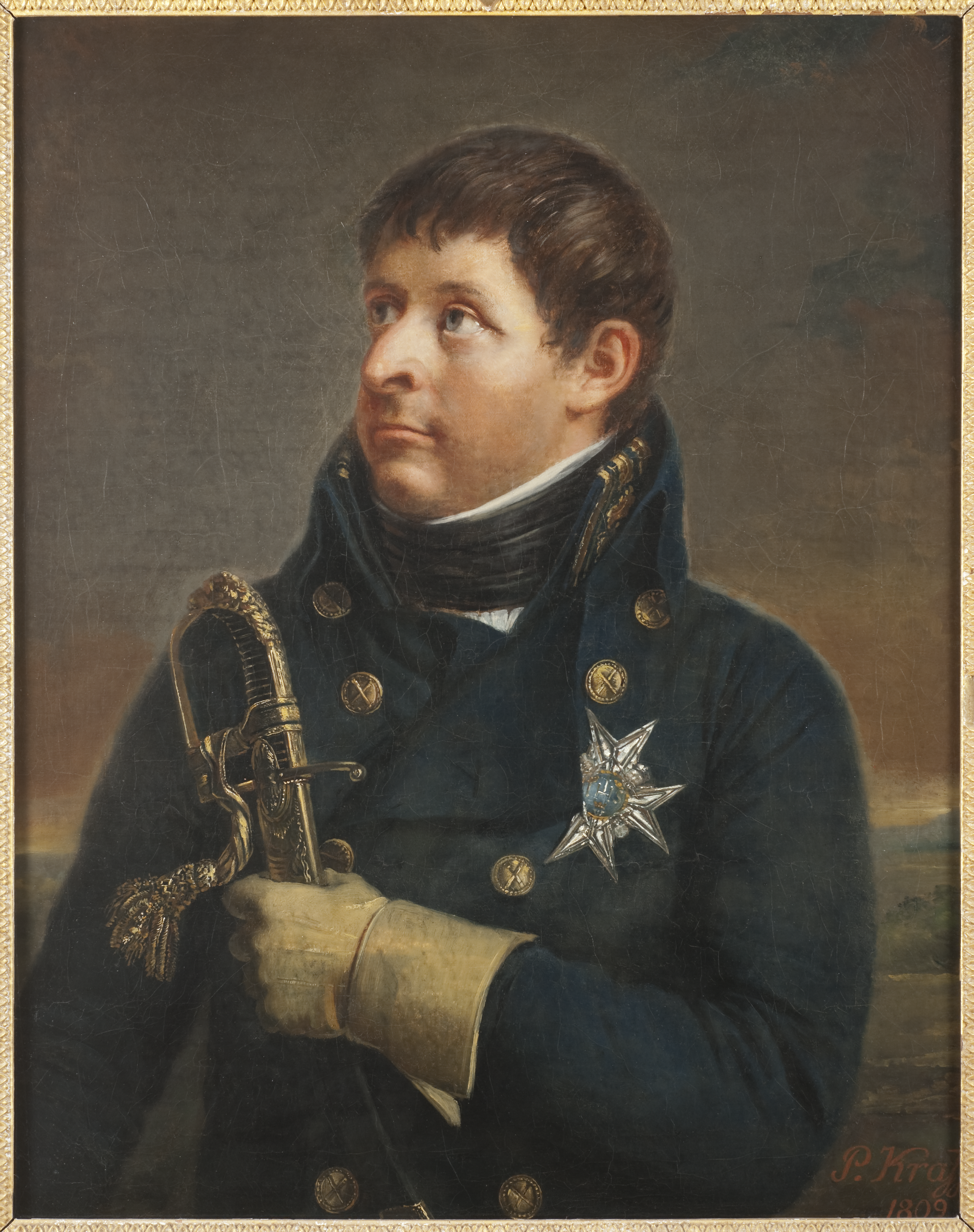
- 1809 portrait

Governor-general of Norway
- Tenure: 25 July 1809 - 11 January 1810
- Predecessor: Jacob Benzon (vacant since 1771)
- Successor: Prince Frederik of Hesse
- Born: 9 July 1768; Augustenborg Palace, Augustenborg, Denmark
- Died: 28 May 1810 (aged 41); Kvidinge, Sweden
- Burial: Riddarholm Church
Names
- Christian August of Schleswig-Holstein-Sonderburg-Augustenborg
- House: Schleswig-Holstein-Sonderburg-Augustenburg
- Father: Friedrich Christian I, Duke of Schleswig-Holstein-Sonderburg-Augustenburg; Charles XIII (adoptive)
- Mother: Charlotte of Schleswig-Holstein-Sonderburg-Plön
- Religion: Church of Denmark

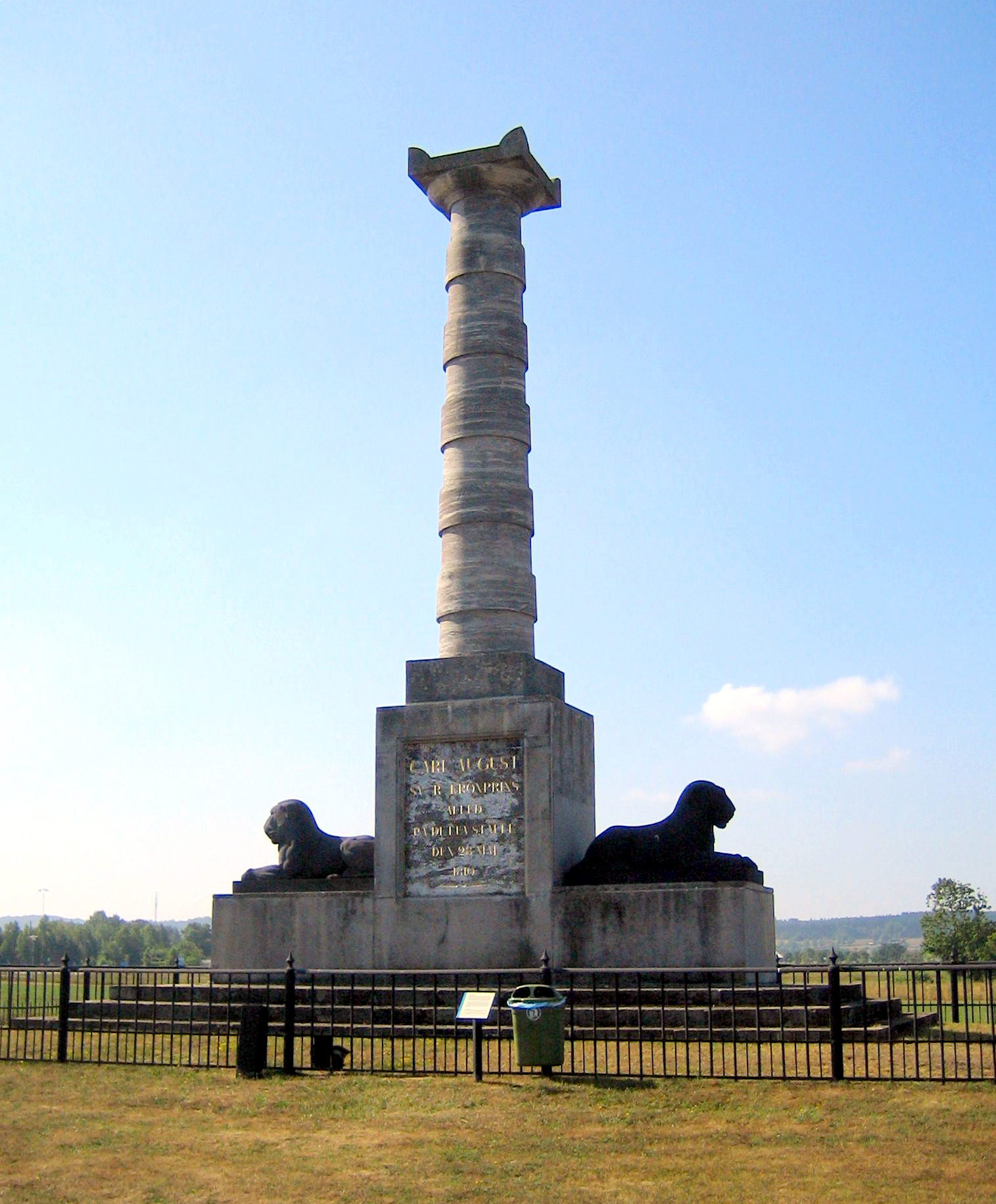
Death monument at Kvidinge

Charles August or Carl August (9 July 1768 – 28 May 1810) was a Danish prince. He served as Crown Prince of Sweden briefly in 1810, adopted by Charles XIII, before his sudden death from a stroke. Earlier, he had been a general in the Royal Danish Army as well as the Governor-general of Norway. His name before assuming the Swedish title in 1810 was Christian August of Schleswig-Holstein-Sonderburg-Augustenburg, or Christian August of Augustenburg for short.

== Family ==
He was born at Augustenborg Palace in July 1768 as the son of Friedrich Christian I, Duke of Schleswig-Holstein-Sonderburg-Augustenburg and his wife, Princess Charlotte of Schleswig-Holstein-Sonderburg-Plön. He was a younger brother of Frederik Christian II, Duke of Augustenborg, brother-in-law of Princess Louise Auguste of Denmark and an uncle of Caroline Amalie of Augustenburg, Queen consort of Denmark and Christian August, Duke of Augustenborg. He did not marry.

== Career in Denmark and Norway ==
Christian August studied in Leipzig, and returned from there to Denmark-Norway in 1785. He was appointed lieutenant colonel, and was promoted to colonel in 1787 and major general in 1790. From 1797 he was stationed in Austria, joining the fight against Napoleon. He left Austria when the Treaty of Lunéville ended the War of the Second Coalition in 1801. In 1803 Christian August was named commander of Fredriksten Fortress in Norway, assuming the position in 1804.

In 1807 he once again became involved in the Napoleonic Wars, this time on the side of Napoleon as Napoleon's enemy Great Britain assaulted Denmark (the Dano-Norwegian campaign of the Napoleonic Wars is often called the Gunboat War). Sweden joined forces against Denmark-Norway in 1808. Christian August was a central figure in the war, and led forces to victories in the battles of Prestebakke and Toverud, ousting the Swedish forces from Norway. In 1808 Christian August was promoted to Field Marshal, and in 1809 he became Governor-general of Norway.

== Sweden ==
On 6 June 1809 the Duke-regent of Sweden was proclaimed King, after Gustav IV Adolf was deposed. The new king Charles XIII accepted the new, liberal Constitution, which was ratified by the Riksdag of the Estates the same day. The new king was in no way likely to interfere with the liberal revolution which had placed him on the throne. Peace was what the exhausted nation now required.

Charles XIII was childless, so in order to secure the succession to the throne, someone had to be adopted as his heir. Georg Adlersparre, the main orchestrator of the 1809 coup, preferred King Frederick VI of Denmark and Norway as the new Swedish monarch, but when Frederick refused, Adlersparre looked to Norway. He tried to persuade Christian August, first through the Swedish Baron C. H. Anckarsvärd, and although Christian August did not show up to meet Anckarsvärd personally, he gradually accepted the offer of adoption. His loyalty to his ruler Frederick VI ultimately became a lesser obstacle. The choice of Christian August was supported by Charles XIII as well as three of the estates of the realm; the Clergy, Burghers and Peasants. However, the Nobility was more reluctant due to the influence of so-called Gustavians (Gustavianerna), supporting the deposed King Gustav IV Adolf and his then-underage son. The decision to adopt Charles August became definitive on 15 July 1809. His great popularity in Norway was considered an advantage to the Swedish plans for the acquisition of that country. In addition, he had demonstrated his interest in a rapprochement between the two countries by refraining from invading Sweden during the Finnish War with Russia.

After the Treaty of Fredrikshamn between Sweden and Russia on 17 September 1809 which concluded the Finnish War, Sweden was ready for the inauguration of Charles August. He finally left Norway for Sweden on 7 January 1810. As Crown Prince of Sweden, he changed his name to Charles August (Swedish: Carl August). Honors were lavished upon him on his arrival, he was for example made an honorary member of the Royal Swedish Academy of Sciences on 18 April 1810, and was the first person to enjoy this status in that academy. However, he did not live long enough to make a historical impact in Sweden. He suddenly died on 28 May 1810, when he fell off his horse during a military practice in Kvidinge. His autopsy confirmed that he had died of a stroke, but at the same time rumours went that he had been poisoned by Gustavians. Specifically, the Marshal of the Realm Count Axel von Fersen the Younger was openly accused of having killed Charles August, and was lynched on 20 June 1810 during the funeral procession of Charles August. Charles August was buried in Riddarholmen Church, the burial church of Swedish monarchs.

== Legacy and aftermath ==
A monument to Charles August was commissioned by Prince Frederik of Hesse and erected in 1810 in the royal park at Bygdøy near Oslo. Before his departure from Oslo, a grand farewell party was held in his honour, and a group of wealthy citizens formed the charitable foundation Prinds Christian Augusts Minde. It acquired a large town house which still bears his name. A street in Oslo, Kristian Augusts gate, was named after him in 1852.

Charles August's successor as adopted Crown Prince, who was accepted by the Riksdag of the Estates in August, was Jean Baptiste Jules Bernadotte.

== See also ==
- House of Schleswig-Holstein-Sonderburg-Augustenburg
- Prinds Christian Augusts Minde - social institution in Oslo named after Charles August

== Ancestry ==
Ancestors of Charles August, Crown Prince of Sweden

16. Ernest Günther, Duke of Schleswig-Holstein-Sonderburg-Augustenburg
8. Prince Frederick William of Schleswig-Holstein-Sonderburg-Augustenburg
17. Princess Augusta of Schleswig-Holstein-Sonderburg-Glücksburg
4. Christian August, Duke of Schleswig-Holstein-Sonderburg-Augustenburg
18. Frederik, Count of Ahlefeldt-Langeland
9. Countess Sophie Amalie of Ahlefeldt-Langeland
19. Countess Marie Elisabeth of Leiningen-Dagsburg-Hartenburg
2. Frederick Christian I, Duke of Schleswig-Holstein-Sonderburg-Augustenburg
20. Christian V of Denmark
10. Christian Gyldenløve, Count Danneskiold-Samsøe
21. Sophie Amalie Moth
5. Countess Frederikke Louise Danneskiold-Samsøe
22. Ulrik Frederik Gyldenløve, Count Laurvig
11. Countess Charlotte Amalie Danneskiold-Laurvig
23. Countess Antoinette Augusta of Aldenburg
1. Charles August, Crown Prince of Sweden
24. Augustus, Duke of Schleswig-Holstein-Sonderburg-Plön-Norburg
12. Prince Christian Charles of Schleswig-Holstein-Sonderburg-Plön-Norburg
25. Princess Elisabeth Charlotte of Anhalt-Harzgerode
6. Frederick Charles, Duke of Schleswig-Holstein-Sonderburg-Plön
26. Johann Franz von Aichelberg
13. Dorothea Christina von Aichelberg
27. Anne Sophie von Trautenburg
3. Princess Charlotte Amalie Wilhelmine of Schleswig-Holstein-Sonderburg-Plön
28. Conrad, Count Reventlow
14. Christian Ditlev, Count Reventlow
29. Anna Margrethe Gabel
7. Countess Christine Ermegaard Reventlow
30. Cay Bertram von Brockdorff
15. Benedikta Margarethe von Brockdorff
31. Hedwig von Rantzau

== Other sources ==
- Blomberg, Wenche (2006) Prinds Christian Augusts Minde - historie og visjoner om de fattiges kvartal Norwegian
- Sandström, Allan (1994) Sveriges sista krig - de dramatiska åren 1808-1809 (Bokförlaget Libris, Örebro) Swedish

Charles August, Crown Prince of Sweden House of Schleswig-Holstein-Sonderburg-Augustenburg Born: 9 July 1768 Died: 28 May 1810
Swedish royalty
Vacant Title last held by Crown Prince Gustav	Heir to the Swedish throne 1810	Vacant Title next held by Carl Johan Bernadotte
