= Frederick Christian I of Schleswig-Holstein-Sonderburg-Augustenburg =

Frederick Christian I
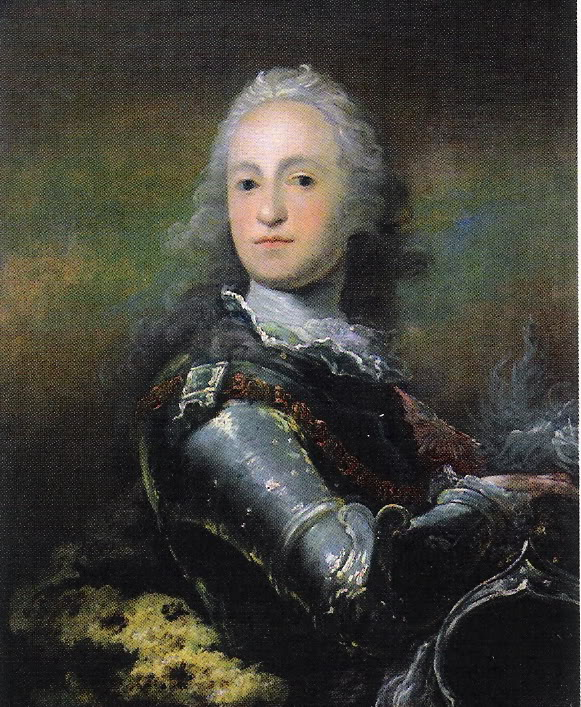
- 1750 portrait

Duke of Schleswig-Holstein-Sonderburg-Augustenburg
- Reign: 20 January 1754 – 13 November 1794
- Predecessor: Christian August
- Successor: Frederick Christian II
- Born: 6 April 1721; Augustenborg
- Died: 13 November 1794 (aged 73); Augustenborg
- Spouse: Princess Charlotte Amalie Wilhelmine of Schleswig-Holstein-Sonderburg-Plön (m. 1762; died 1770)
- Issue among others...: Frederick Christian II; Charles August, Crown Prince of Sweden
- House: Oldenburg
- Father: Christian August, Duke of Schleswig-Holstein-Sonderburg-Augustenburg
- Mother: Countess Louise Frederikke of Danneskiold-Samsøe

Frederick Christian I (German: Friedrich Christian I., Danish: Frederik Christian 1.; 6 April 1721 – 13 November 1794) was Duke of Schleswig-Holstein-Sonderburg-Augustenburg from 1754 to 1794.

== Early life and ancestry ==
He was born into the Augustenburg branch of the House of Oldenburg, as the eldest son of Christian August, Duke of Schleswig-Holstein-Sonderburg-Augustenburg and Duchess Louise Frederikke née Countess of Danneskiold-Samsøe.

== Biography ==
In 1754, his father died and Frederick Christian inherited Augustenborg Castle and Gråsten. However, these estates were deeply in debt. He waived his claims on the duchies of Schleswig and Holstein and in return the King of Denmark (who was also Duke of Schleswig and Holstein) granted him a favourable settlement. This allowed him to purchase Als and Sundeved, making him the largest landowner in Schleswig. He was also able to expand Augustenborg Castle, the family residence.

Duke Frederick Christian served as a general in the Danish army. He was also made a Knight of the Order of the Elephant.

== Marriage and issue ==
On 26 May 1762, Frederick Christian married Princess Charlotte Amalie Wilhelmine of Schleswig-Holstein-Sonderburg-Plön, the youngest but one daughter of Frederick Charles, Duke of Schleswig-Holstein-Sonderburg-Plön and Countess Christine Armgard von Reventlow, niece of the Danish queen consort Anne Sophie von Reventlow.

The couple had seven children:

- Louise Christine Caroline (16 February 1763 – 27 January 1764);
- Louise Christine Caroline (17 February 1764 – 2 August 1815);
- Frederick Christian II (28 September 1765 – 14 June 1814), married Princess Louise Auguste of Denmark;
- Frederick Charles Emil (8 March 1767 – 14 June 1841), Danish General, married Sofie Eleonore Friederike of Scheel (1776–1836); daughter of Jürgen Eric of Scheel;
- Christian August (9 July 1768 – 28 May 1810), Danish general and, later, Crown Prince of Sweden as Karl August (died before he could ascend the throne);
- Sophie Amelie (10 August 1769 – 6 October 1769);
- Charles William (4 October 1770 – 22 February 1771).

== Ancestors ==
Ancestors of Frederick Christian I of Schleswig-Holstein-Sonderburg-Augustenburg

16. Alexander, Duke of Schleswig-Holstein-Sonderburg
8. Ernest Günther, Duke of Schleswig-Holstein-Sonderburg-Augustenburg
17. Countess Dorothea von Schwarzburg-Sondershausen
4. Frederick William of Schleswig-Holstein-Sonderburg-Augustenburg
18. Philip, Duke of Schleswig-Holstein-Sonderburg-Glücksburg
9. Duchess Auguste of Schleswig-Holstein-Sonderburg-Glücksburg
19. Duchess Sophie Hedwig of Saxe-Lauenburg
2. Christian August, Duke of Schleswig-Holstein-Sonderburg-Augustenburg
20. Frederick von Ahlefeldt
10. Frederick, Count von Ahlefeldt-Rixingen-Langeland
21. Brigitte von Ahlefeldt
5. Countess Sofie Amalie von Ahlefeld-Langeland
22. Frederick Emich, Count zu Leiningen-Dagsburg-Hardenburg
11. Countess Marie Elisabeth zu Leiningen-Dagsburg
23. Countess Sibylla of Waldeck-Wildungen
1. Frederick Christian I, Duke of Schleswig-Holstein-Sonderburg-Augustenburg
24. Frederick III of Denmark
12. Christian V of Denmark
25. Sophie Amalie of Brunswick-Lüneburg
6. Christian Gyldenløve, Count of Samsø
26. Poul Mathiassen Moth
13. Sofie Amalie Moth
27. Ida Dorothea Bureneus
3. Countess Friederike Louise af Danneskiold-Samsøe
28. Frederick III of Denmark (= 24)
14. Ulrik Frederik Gyldenløve, Count of Laurvig
29. Margarethe von Pape, Baroness of Løvendal
7. Countess Charlotte Amalie af Danneskjold-Laurvig
30. Anton I, Count von Aldenburg und Knyphausen
15. Countess Antoinette Augusta von Aldenburg
31. Countess Auguste Johanna zu Sayn-Wittgenstein-Hohenstein

Frederick Christian I of Schleswig-Holstein-Sonderburg-Augustenburg House of Oldenburg Born: 6 April 1721 Died: 13 November 1794
Preceded by Christian August	Duke of Schleswig-Holstein-Sonderburg-Augustenburg; 1754–1794	Succeeded by Frederick Christian II
