= Christian Augustus II of Schleswig-Holstein-Sonderburg-Augustenburg =

Christian August II
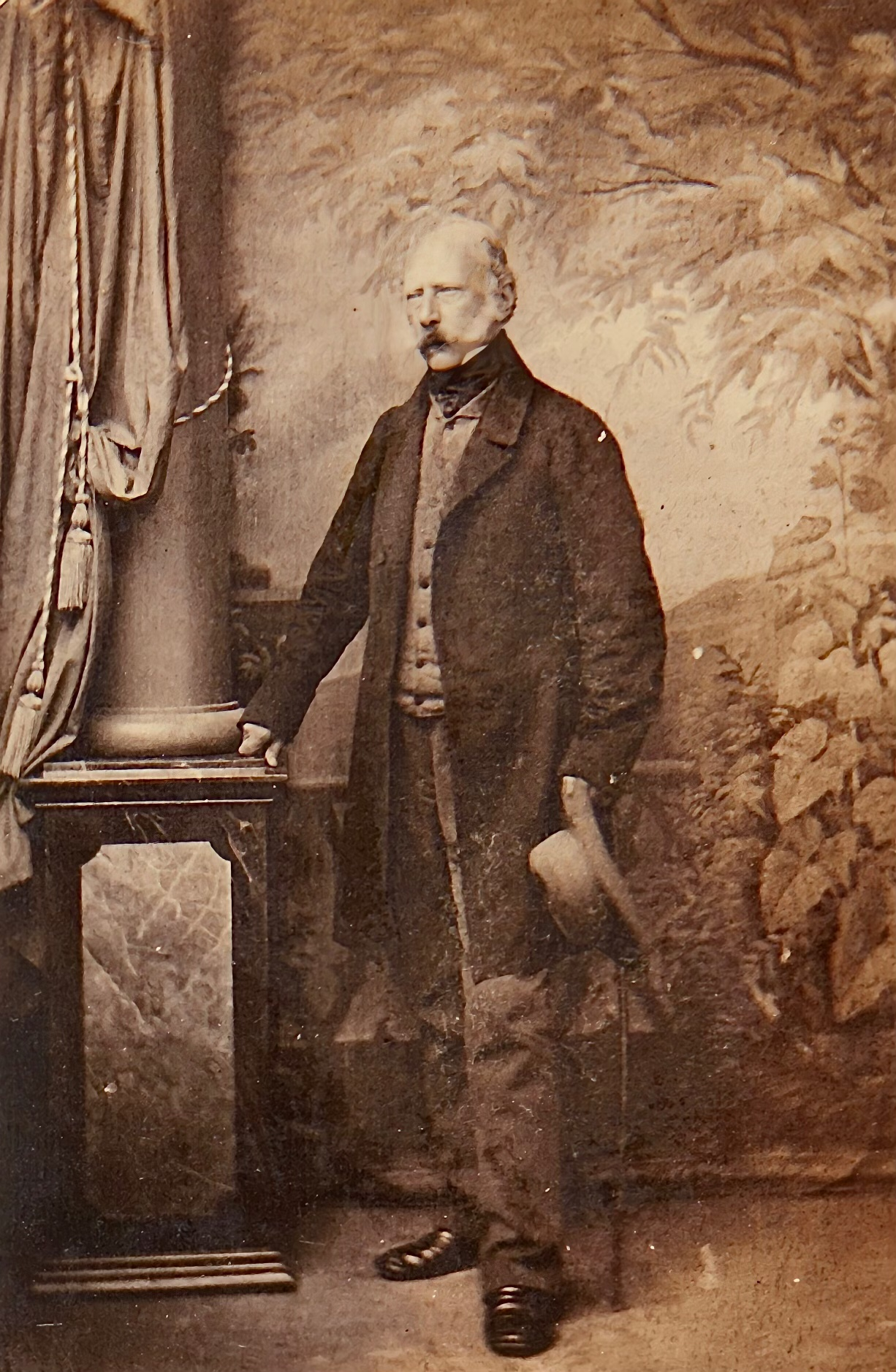
- Photograph of Christian August II, c. 1860

Duke of Schleswig-Holstein-Sonderburg-Augustenburg
- Reign: 14 June 1814 – 11 March 1869
- Predecessor: Frederick Christian II
- Successor: Frederick VIII
- Born: 19 July 1798; Copenhagen, Denmark
- Died: 11 March 1869 (aged 70); Primkenau (now Przemków), Silesia, Prussia
- Spouse: Countess Louise Sophie Danneskiold-Samsøe (m. 1820; died 1867)
- Issue: Alexander, Hereditary Prince of Schleswig-Holstein-Sonderburg-Augustenburg; Princess Louise Auguste; Princess Caroline Amelie; Princess Wilhelmine; Frederick VIII, Duke of Schleswig-Holstein; Prince Christian; Princess Henriette
Names
- English: Christian Charles Frederick Augustus; Danish: Christian Carl Frederik August; German: Christian Karl Friedrich August
- House: Schleswig-Holstein-Sonderburg-Augustenburg
- Father: Frederick Christian II, Duke of Schleswig-Holstein-Sonderburg-Augustenburg
- Mother: Princess Louise Auguste of Denmark

Christian August II, Duke of Schleswig-Holstein-Sonderburg-Augustenburg (19 July 1798 – 11 March 1869, Christian Carl Frederik August), commonly known as Christian, Duke of Augustenborg, was a Danish and German prince and statesman. During the 1850s and 1860s, he was a claimant to first duke of the whole provinces of Schleswig and Holstein, and a candidate to become king of Denmark following the death of King Frederick VII. He was the father-in-law of Princess Helena (daughter of Queen Victoria) and the paternal grandfather of Augusta Victoria, German Empress and wife of Kaiser Wilhelm II.

== Family and lineage ==
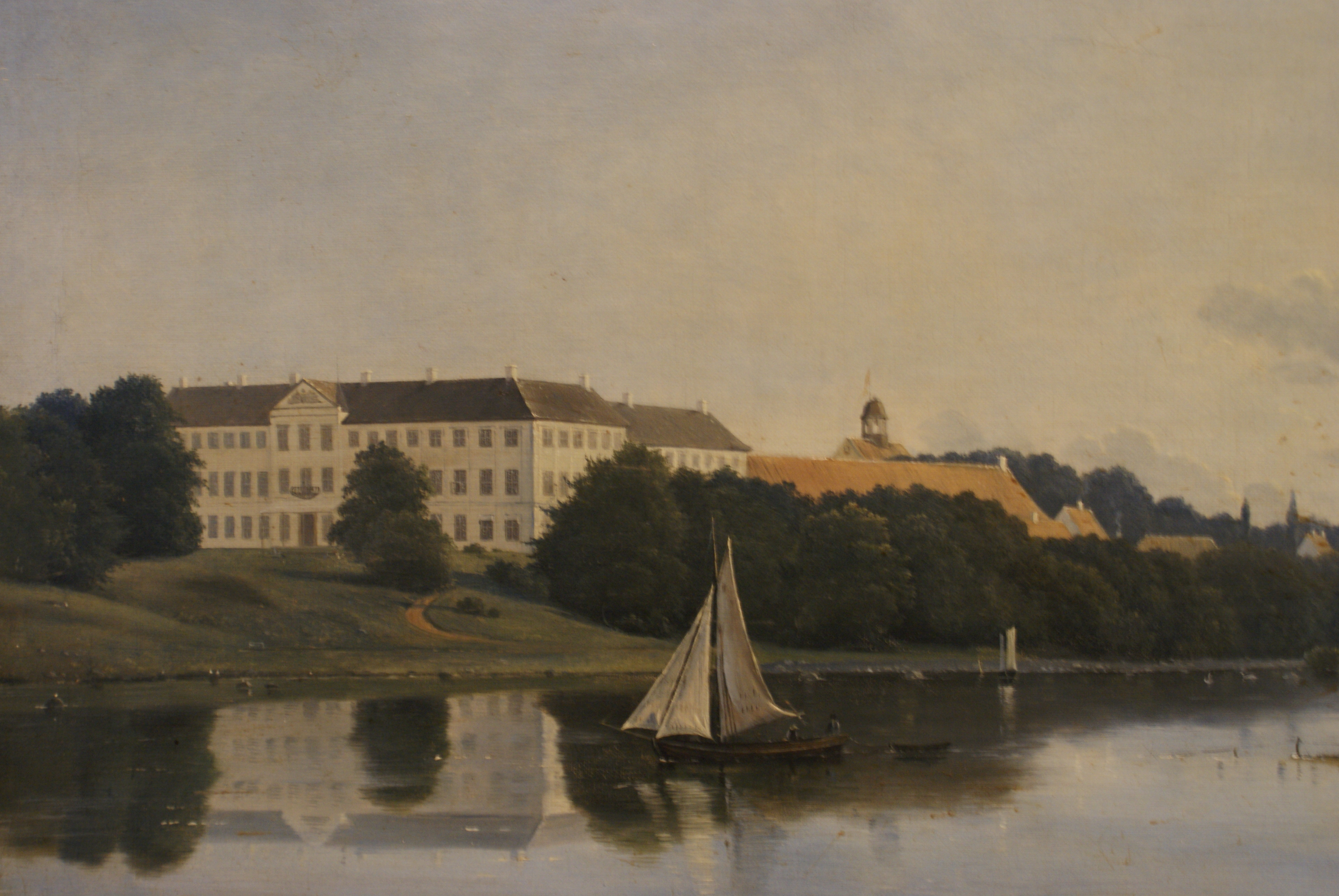
Augustenborg Palace in 1845

He was closely related to Kings Christian VII, Frederick VI and Christian VIII of Denmark through his mother and was a claimant for the Danish throne in the 1860s.

Born a prince of the House of Schleswig-Holstein-Sonderburg-Augustenburg and scion of a cadet-line descendant of the Danish royal House of Oldenburg, Christian August was the fiefholder of Augustenborg and Sønderborg. He was also a claimant to the rulership of the provinces of Sleswig and Holstein, and he was also a candidate to become king of Denmark during the succession crisis caused by the childlessness of King Frederick VII of Denmark. He lost the chance to ascend the throne to his distant kinsman, Prince Christian of Schleswig-Holstein-Sonderburg-Beck.

Christian August was the eldest son and heir of Frederik Christian II, Duke of Augustenburg and his wife Princess Louise Auguste of Denmark. His father was the head of the senior cadet branch of the ruling house of Denmark, and thus the nearest agnatic kin of the kings of Denmark. Furthermore, his mother Louisa Auguste was (officially) the daughter of King Christian VII of Denmark, the sister of King Frederick VI and the first cousin of King Christian VIII. Due to all this, Christian August was high in the line of succession to the Danish throne. He also enjoyed additional influence in the Danish court because his sister, Caroline Amalie, was the beloved second wife of King Christian VIII (his mother's cousin).

Christian August's family lost out in the competition for the throne of Denmark mainly because of the widely accepted belief that his mother was actually fathered by Johann Friedrich Struensee, Christian VII's royal physician. If true, this would mean Christian August was not a true legitimate descendant of Frederick III, the first hereditary monarch of Denmark. His claim was further weakened by having married for love to Countess Louise Sophie Danneskiold-Samsøe, a woman of unequal rank.

== Biography ==
In the early 1800s, Duke Christian was placed in charge of Frederiksborger horse breeding at the Royal Stud by his maternal grandfather, Christian VII of Denmark, and imported several Thoroughbred stallions from Great Britain to stand at stud in Denmark. The Duke also served as an advisor on the breeding of Holsteiner horses, and imported the Thoroughbred stallion Protocol (b. 1828) to Schleswig-Holstein (later Germany).

In 1848, German-nationalist sympathies prompted a rebellion in Schleswig-Holstein against Danish rule. A provisional government was established at Kiel under the Duke of Augustenborg, who travelled to Berlin to secure the assistance of Prussia in asserting his rights. The First War of Schleswig ensued.

However, European powers were united in opposing any dismemberment of Denmark. Among others, Emperor Nicholas I of Russia, speaking with authority as Head of the elder Holstein-Gottorp line, regarded the Duke of Augustenborg a rebel. Russia had guaranteed Schleswig to the Danish crown by the treaties of 1767 and 1773.

A treaty of peace between Prussia and Denmark was signed at Berlin on 2 July 1850. Both parties reserved their antecedent rights. Denmark was satisfied that the treaty empowered the king-duke to restore his authority in Holstein with or without the consent of the German Confederation. Augustenburg was ousted from power, as Danish troops marched in to subdue the duchies.

The question of the Augustenburg succession made an agreement between the major powers impossible, and on 31 March 1852 the duke of Augustenburg resigned his claim in return for a money payment. Duke Christian sold his rights to the Duchy of Schleswig-Holstein to Denmark in the aftermath of the Punctation of Olmütz, but later renounced his rights to the Duchy of Schleswig-Holstein in favor of his son Frederik August.

In November 1863, his son Frederick proclaimed himself rightful second Duke of Schleswig and Holstein, following the death of Frederick VII of Denmark, the last King of Denmark who, by primogeniture, was also sovereign Duke of Schleswig and Holstein, but whose death extinguished the patriline of Denmark's hereditary Oldenburg kings. The resulting divergence of hereditary claims to the duchies eventually developed into the Second War of Schleswig.

He died in 1869.

== Marriage and issue ==
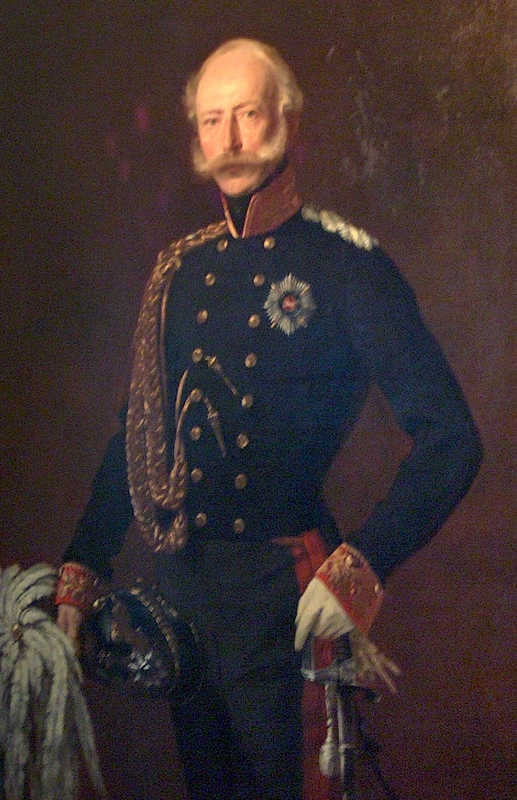
Portrait of Christian August II, c. 1845

Christian married in 1820 his second cousin, Countess Lovisa-Sophie af Danneskjold-Samsøe (1796–1867), a Danish noblewoman who belonged to the House of Danneskiold-Samsøe, which in turn was an illegitimate branch of the Danish royal House of Oldenburg. They had seven children:

- Prince Alexander Frederick William Christian Charles Augustus (20 July 1821 – 3 May 1823), died young
- Princess Louise Auguste (28 August 1823 – 30 May 1872)
- Princess Caroline Amelie (15 January 1826 – 3 May 1901)
- Princess Wilhelmine (24 March 1828 – 4 July 1829), died young
- Prince Frederick Christian August (6 July 1829 – 14 January 1880), later Duke of Schleswig-Holstein-Sonderburg-Augustenburg. He married Princess Adelheid of Hohenlohe-Langenburg and had issue, including Augusta Viktoria "Dona", Empress of Germany as the wife of Kaiser Wilhelm II.
- Frederick Christian Charles Augustus (22 January 1831 – 28 October 1917), later (1866) married his third cousin Princess Helena of the United Kingdom (daughter of Queen Victoria) and settled in England. They were the parents of Albert, Duke of Schleswig-Holstein.
- Princess Caroline Christiane Auguste Emilie Henriette Elisabeth (2 August 1833 – 18 October 1917). She married Friedrich von Esmarch in 1872.

== Place in Danish royal family and claim to throne ==
Family of Christian Augustus II of Schleswig-Holstein-Sonderburg-Augustenburg

Christian III of Denmark
Frederick II of Denmark	John II, Duke of Schleswig-Holstein-Sonderburg
Christian IV of Denmark	Alexander, Duke of Schleswig-Holstein-Sonderburg
Frederick III of Denmark	Ernest Günther	August Philipp
Christian V of Denmark	Frederick William	Frederick Louis
Frederick IV of Denmark	Christian August	Peter August
Christian VI of Denmark	Frederick Christian I	Karl Anton August
Frederick V of Denmark	Frederick Christian II m. Princess Louise Auguste of Denmark	Friedrich Karl Ludwig
Christian VII of Denmark	Frederick, Hereditary Prince of Denmark	Christian August II* son of Princess Louise Auguste of Denmark	Friedrich Wilhelm
Frederick VI of Denmark	Princess Louise Auguste of Denmark	Christian VIII of Denmark	Princess Louise Charlotte of Denmark	(Prince Christian); CHRISTIAN IX OF DENMARK
Princess Caroline of Denmark	Christian August II*	Frederick VII of Denmark	Louise of Hesse-Kassel

== Ancestry ==
Ancestors of Christian Augustus II of Schleswig-Holstein-Sonderburg-Augustenburg

8. Christian August, Duke of Schleswig-Holstein-Sonderburg-Augustenburg
4. Frederick Christian I, Duke of Schleswig-Holstein-Sonderburg-Augustenburg
9. Countess Frederikke Louise Danneskiold-Samsøe
2. Frederick Christian II, Duke of Schleswig-Holstein-Sonderburg-Augustenburg
10. Frederick Charles, Duke of Schleswig-Holstein-Sonderburg-Plön
5. Princess Charlotte Amalie Wilhelmine of Schleswig-Holstein-Sonderburg-Plön
11. Countess Christine Ermegaard Reventlow
1. Christian August II, Duke of Schleswig-Holstein-Sonderburg-Augustenburg
12. Frederick V of Denmark
6. Christian VII of Denmark
13. Princess Louisa of Great Britain
3. Princess Louise Auguste of Denmark
14. Frederick, Prince of Wales
7. Princess Caroline Matilda of Great Britain
15. Princess Augusta of Saxe-Gotha

Christian Augustus II of Schleswig-Holstein-Sonderburg-Augustenburg House of Oldenburg Born: 19 July 1798 Died: 11 March 1869
Preceded by Frederick Christian II	Duke of Augustenburg; 1814–1869	Succeeded by Frederick VIII
