= Christian August =

Christian August may refer to:

- Christian August of Saxe-Zeitz (1666–1725)
- Christian August of Holstein-Gottorp, Prince of Eutin (1673–1726)
- Christian August, Prince of Anhalt-Zerbst (1690–1747)
- Christian August, Duke of Schleswig-Holstein-Sonderburg-Augustenburg (1696–1754)
- Charles August, Crown Prince of Sweden (1768–1810), also known as Christian August of Augustenburg
