= Frederick, Duke of Schleswig-Holstein-Sonderburg-Augustenburg =

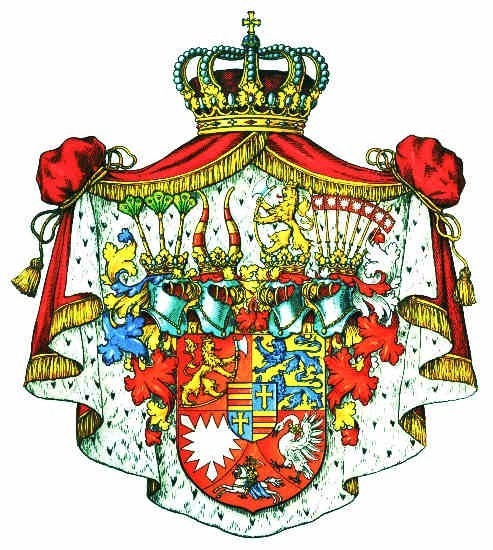
- Born: 10 December 1652
- Died: 3 August 1692 (aged 39); Edingen
- Noble family: House of Oldenburg
- Spouse: Anna Christine Bereuter
- Father: Ernest Günther, Duke of Schleswig-Holstein-Sonderburg-Augustenburg
- Mother: Auguste of Schleswig-Holstein-Sonderburg-Glücksburg

Frederick, Duke of Schleswig-Holstein-Sonderburg-Augustenburg (10 December 1652 – 3 August 1692 in Edingen) was a Dano-German nobleman. He was the oldest son of Duke Ernest Günther and his wife, Duchess Auguste.

== Life ==
He succeeded his father as Duke of Schleswig-Holstein-Sonderburg-Augustenburg in 1689. However, he died only three years later, in 1692, during the war against the French.

Frederick was married to Anna Christine Bereuter; this marriage remained childless. He was succeeded by his younger brother Ernest August.

Frederick, Duke of Schleswig-Holstein-Sonderburg-Augustenburg House of Oldenburg Born: 27 December 1652 Died: 3 August 1692
Preceded by Ernest Günther	Duke of Schleswig-Holstein-Sonderburg-Augustenburg; 1689–1692	Succeeded by Ernest August
