= Prinds Christian Augusts Minde =

Coordinates: 59°54′54.66″N 10°45′22.24″E

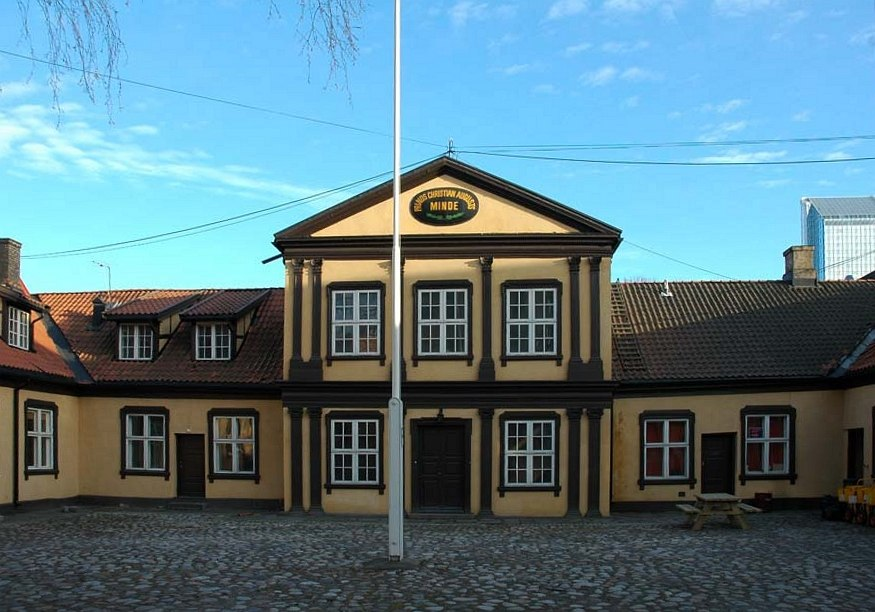
Mangelsgården

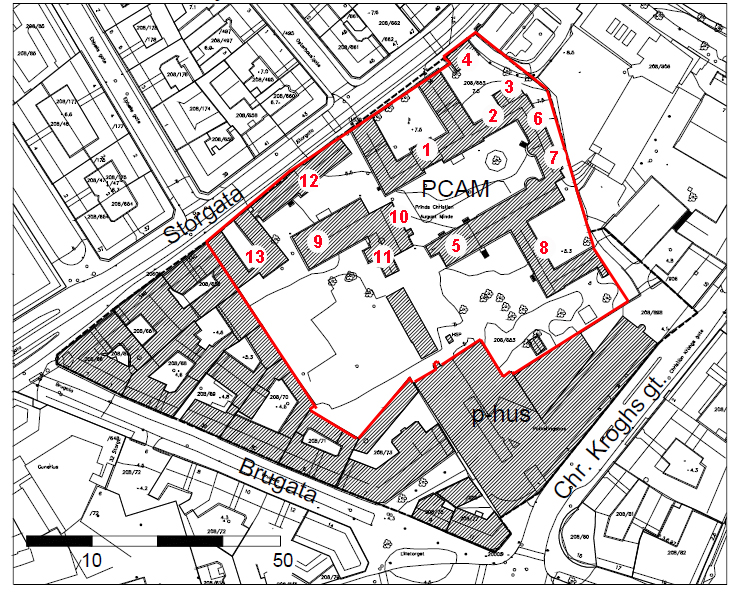
Map showing the buildings of Prinds Christian Augusts Minde. Red frame = protected area. Buildings: 1) Mangelsgården main building. 2) Mangelsgården north wing, jailhouse. 3) Mangelsgården shed. 4) Mangelsgården kitchen / firehouse. 5) Poor hospital. 6) Christiania asylum. 7) Men's ward of the asylum. 8) Women's ward of the asylum. 9) Factory building. 10) Factory building, church wing. 11) Machine and kettle house. 12) Washery 13) Bazaars

Prinds Christian Augusts Minde was an asylum, workhouse and social institution located at Storgata 36 in downtown Oslo, Norway.

== History ==
Mangelsgården was built in 1670–1698. The building was originally raised as a holiday residence with pavilions, dams and fountains. The first known owner was Danish general Hans Ernst von Tritzschler (1647–1718). The next owner was general Fredrik Ferdinand Hausmann (1693–1757), son of Caspar Herman Hausmann and Karen Toller. Hausmann built the garden with fish ponds, pavilions and food production. The third owner was general Johan Mangelsen (1694–1769).

A group of prominent citizens formed the "Prinds Christian Augusts Minde" charity in 1809, in honour of the Danish Governor-General of Norway, Christian August. The charity was set up to help the poor and unemployed: The number of poor people had increased dramatically in the city, and the prisons were overcrowded. The charity bought Mangelsgården in 1812. The facility next housed the hospital for the poor (fattigsykehus) and public kitchen (dampkjøkken) together with separate living quarters for men and women. The facility also held a police office and jailhouse (dollhus).

Most notably the spinning factory of the institution for the care of the poor (Fattigvesenet) was also moved here. The factory soon turned into a workhouse focused on textile production, stone cutting, and woodworking. The complex was expanded several times and in 1833 a factory building drawn by architect Christian H. Grosch was erected.

Christiania Insane Hospital (Sinnssykeasyler) was moved to Mangelsgården in 1829 and was expanded after the new lunatic asylum laws were passed in 1848. It closed down in 1908.

== Present day ==
The main building of Mangelsgården was protected as a cultural heritage site in 1927. Historic protection was extended to cover the entire complex in 2009. The plant is currently owned by municipalities and is run by Omsorgsbygg Oslo KF, an enterprise which builds, maintains and manages municipal purpose buildings within the city of Oslo.
