= Als (island) =

Danish island in the Baltic Sea

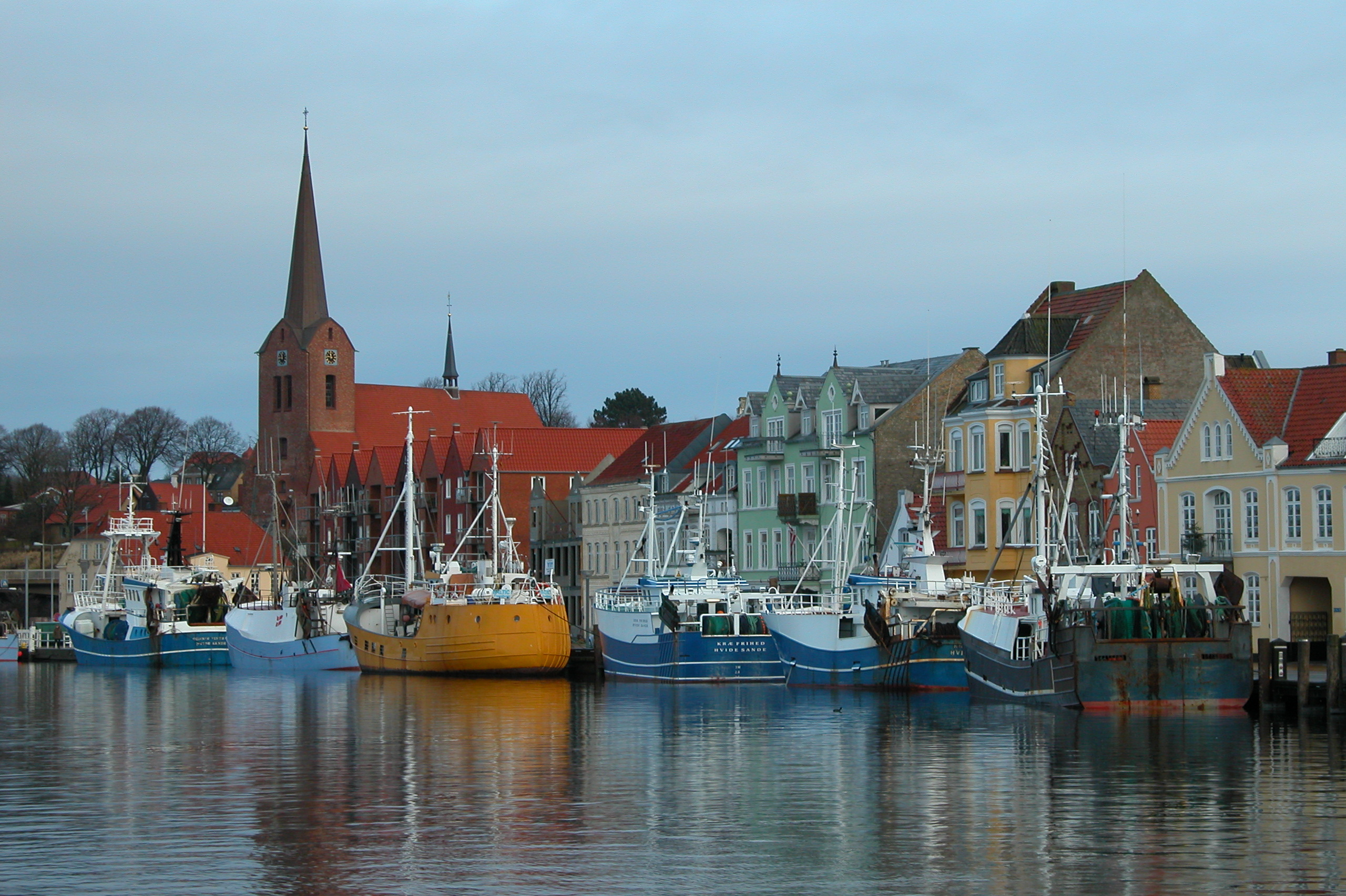
- Sønderborg Harbour

Geography
- Location: Little Belt
- Coordinates: 54°59′N 09°55′E
- Area: 321 km^{2} (124 sq mi)

Administration
- Denmark
- Region: South Denmark Region
- Municipality: Sønderborg Municipality
- Largest settlement: Sønderborg (pop. 27,194)

Demographics
- Population: 51,322 (2010)
- Pop. density: 154.5/km^{2} (400.2/sq mi)

Als (Danish pronunciation: [ˈælˀs], German: Alsen) is a Danish island in the Baltic Sea.

== Geography ==
Als lies to the east of the Jutland peninsula, and north of the coast of Southern Schleswig, Germany. Covering an area of 321 km^{2} (124 sq mi), the island has a total population of 51,322 as of 1 January 2010. It is administered as part of the Sønderborg Municipality as of 1 January 2007.

To the north and east of the island are the waters of the Little Belt, to the south is Flensborg Fjord, and to the west is Als Fjord and Als Strait (Alssund).

The town of Sønderborg is the capital, and was originally entirely on the island, but has spread onto the mainland, being split by the waters of Als Strait: the strait that separates the island from Jutland, the Danish mainland and part of Als Fjord. It has a good harbour and considerable trade. The two halves of the city are connected over the fjord by two bridges: the 682-metre-long Als Strait Bridge (Alssundbro), built between 1978 and 1981, carries road traffic; and the 331-metre-long King Christian X's Bridge (Kong Christian Xs Bro), built between 1925 and 1930, which originally carried both road and rail traffic but is now purely for road traffic.

Ferry services are run from the town of Hardeshøj on the island to Ballebro on the Jutland mainland, and from the town of Fynshav to Søby on the island of Ærø and to Bøjden on the island of Funen.

Als is a fertile island with a thriving pig breeding industry. The island was formerly known for its fruit orchards, some of which are still in operation.

The west coast of the island has many bays and coves: Stegsvig, Sandvig, Ketting Nor, Lille Hav, Augstenborg Fjord, Kær Vig, Hørup Hav, and Dyvig. On the east coast along the Little Belt lies the 7 km^{2} Northern Forest (Nørreskov), and Lake Nordborg (Nordborg Sø).

The former municipality of Nordborg is the home of Danfoss, Denmark's largest industrial company, and a number of its subsidiaries.

== History ==
Many archaeological finds show that the island has been inhabited since the late Stone Age. The Hjortspring boat, for example, dates to the Bronze or Iron Ages.

During the Middle Ages the island came under the influence of a number of noblemen, each of which ruled over their portion of the island, and its citizens. King Christian III's son, Duke John, came in possession of the island as a titular Duchy, and he bought the other noblemen out. The island was again divided into several smaller Duchies later on, but this venture failed eventually.

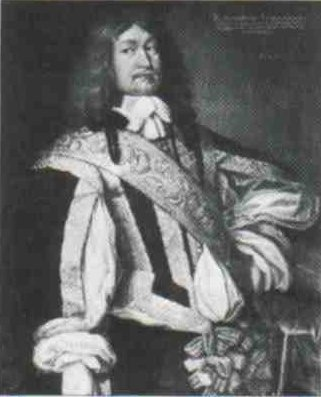
Duke Ernst Günther I, first Duke of Augustenborg (1609–1689).

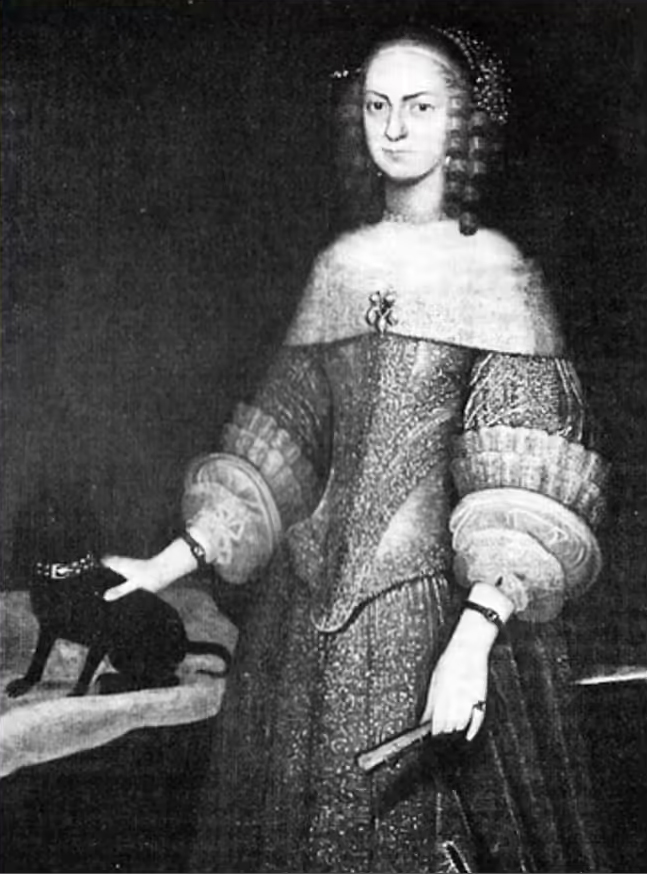
Duchess Auguste, first Duchess of Augustenborg (1633–1701).

The town of Augustenborg grew up around Augustenborg Palace which was established in the years after 1651 by Ernest Günther, a member of the ducal House of Schleswig-Holstein (its branch of Sønderborg), great-grandson of King Christian III, and a cadet of the royal house of Denmark. The palace, and the town consequently, received the name in honour of Ernest's wife Auguste, who was from another branch of the Dukes of Schleswig-Holstein.

In 1658, troops under Frederick William invaded the island, successfully reconquering it from the Swedes during the Dano-Swedish War of 1658–1660.

The palace became the chief seat of their line which used the name Augustenborg as its branch name. Later a Danish king made the head of that line specifically Duke of Augustenborg. They grew in relative prominence in late 18th century, and the Duke of Augustenborg became the dominating person on the island.

The Duchy was taken over by the Danish Crown after the last Duke of Augustenborg to live at the palace, Christian August II, had sided with the Schleswig-Holstein pro-German nationalist movement against Denmark. He left on March 18, 1848.

That same year during the First Schleswig War (1848–1851), the Danes directed their main attack against Field Marshal Friedrich Graf von Wrangel's Austro-Prussian army from the lighthouse on the peninsula of Kegnæs at the southwest end of Als.

In 1864 the Battle of Als took place there.

After these two wars over which nation would rule the island (and the whole of Schleswig), the following period saw the island under Prussian and German rule, although the island's population was largely Danish.

In 1870 Als was fortified by Prussia.

Following the Schleswig plebiscites of 1920, Als as part of the northern voting zone returned to Danish rule.

After 1920 Als has been marked by growing industry, especially after 1945 when Danfoss grew into an international corporation.

The Augustenburg line died out in the 20th century.

== Attractions ==
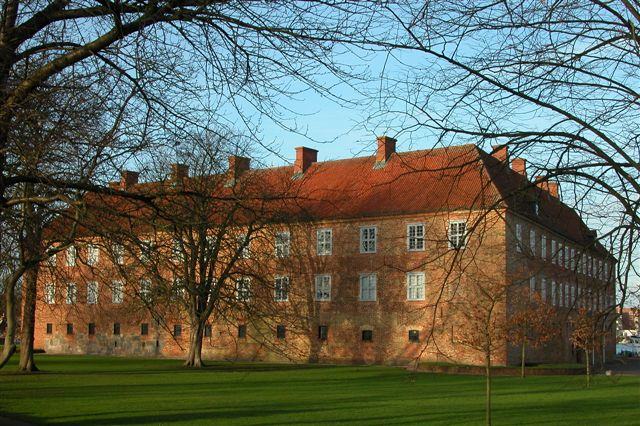
Sønderborg Castle

The town of Sønderborg is home to Sønderborg Castle (Sønderborg Slot) and Sandbjerg Estate (Sandbjerg Gods). Sønderborg castle is located in the centre of the town, and houses a museum focusing on the history and culture of the area. The museum is open year-round. Sandbjerg Estate, which had belonged for many years to the Dukes of Sønderborg, and then to the Reventlow family, was donated to Aarhus University in 1954.

The island's Augustenborg Palace has been converted into a hospital. There is an exhibit about the castle, the town and its ducal history in the building's entryway. The castle church is open to the public in the summertime, and tours are given.

== In literature ==
The writer Herman Bang was born in 1857 Asserballe on Als and was a child during the Second Schleswig War when the island came under Prussian (later German) rule. That traumatic war forms the background of Bang's novel Tine (1889), which tells the tragic love story of a young girl on the island of Als. It was translated to various other languages, making people in other countries familiar with Als.

== Image gallery ==
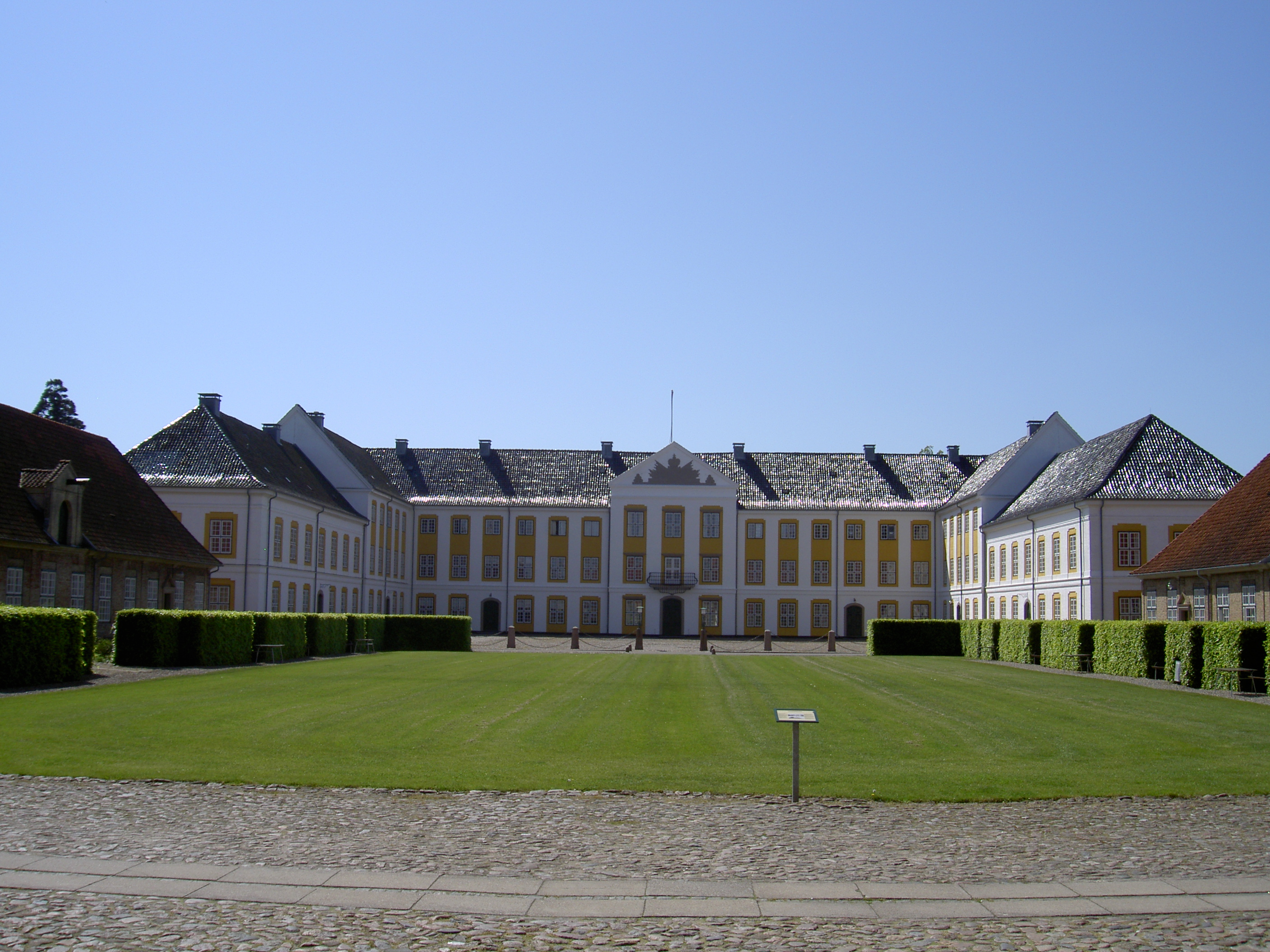
Augustenborg Castle

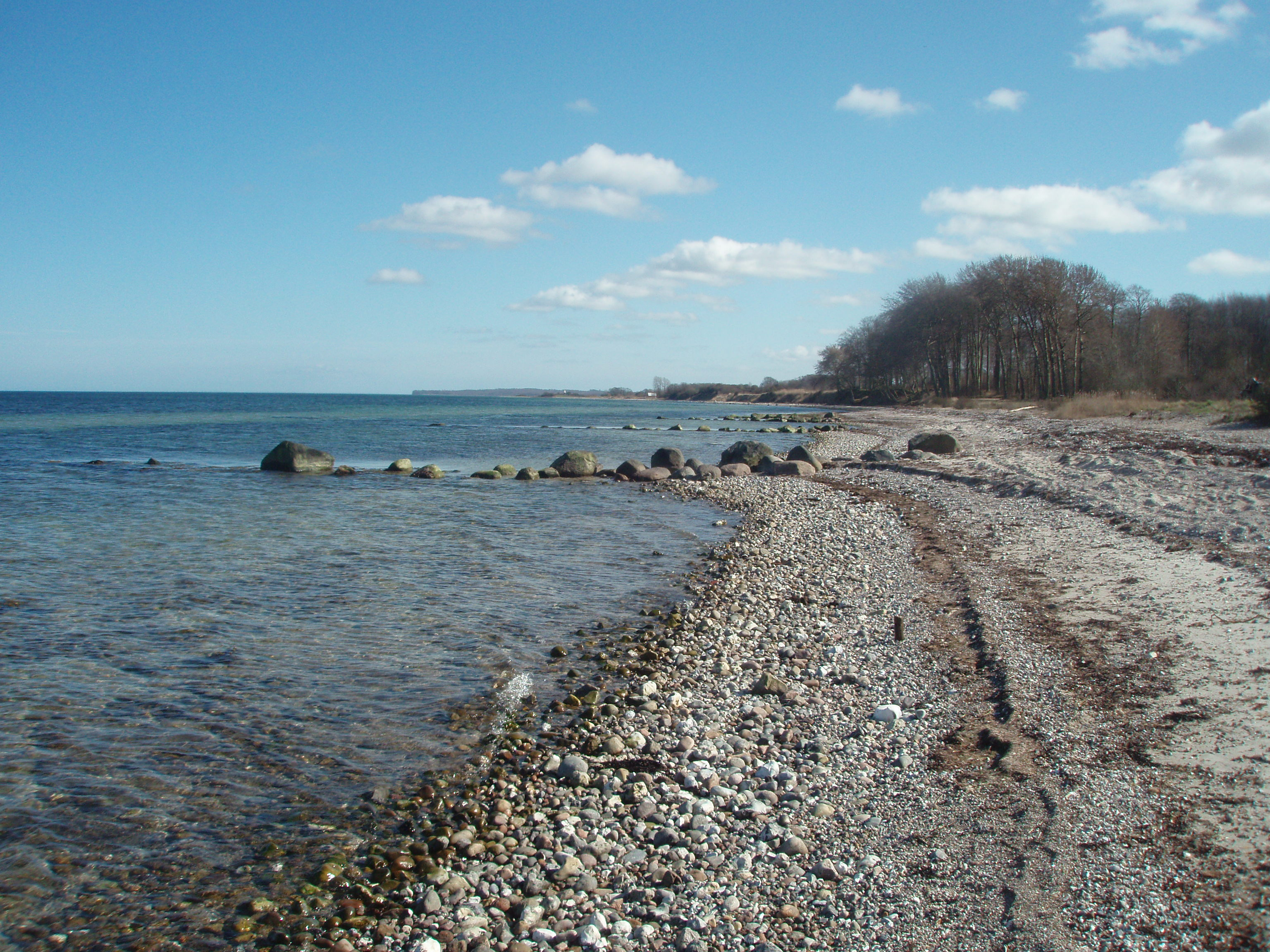
Havnbjerg beach

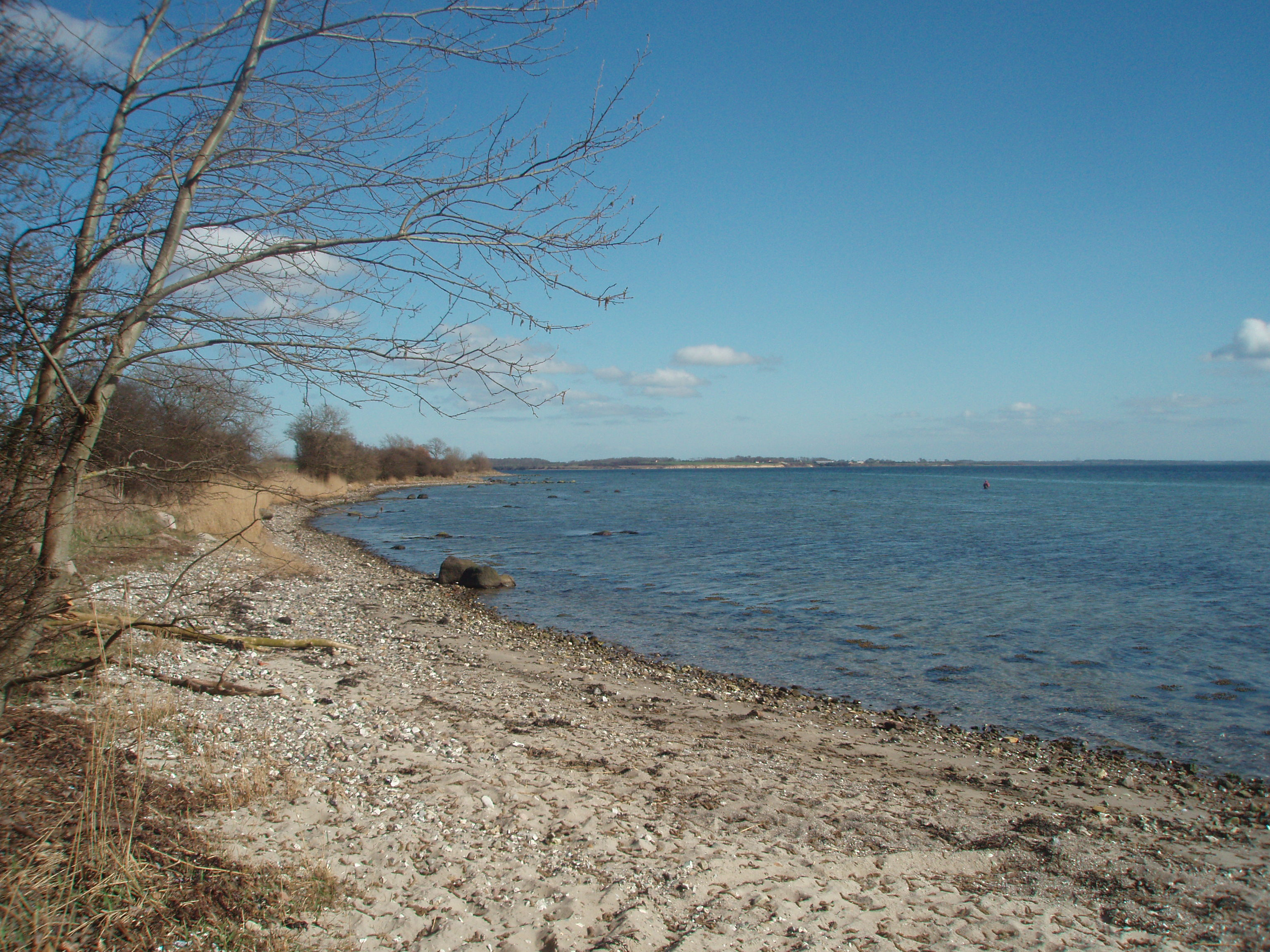
Lusig beach

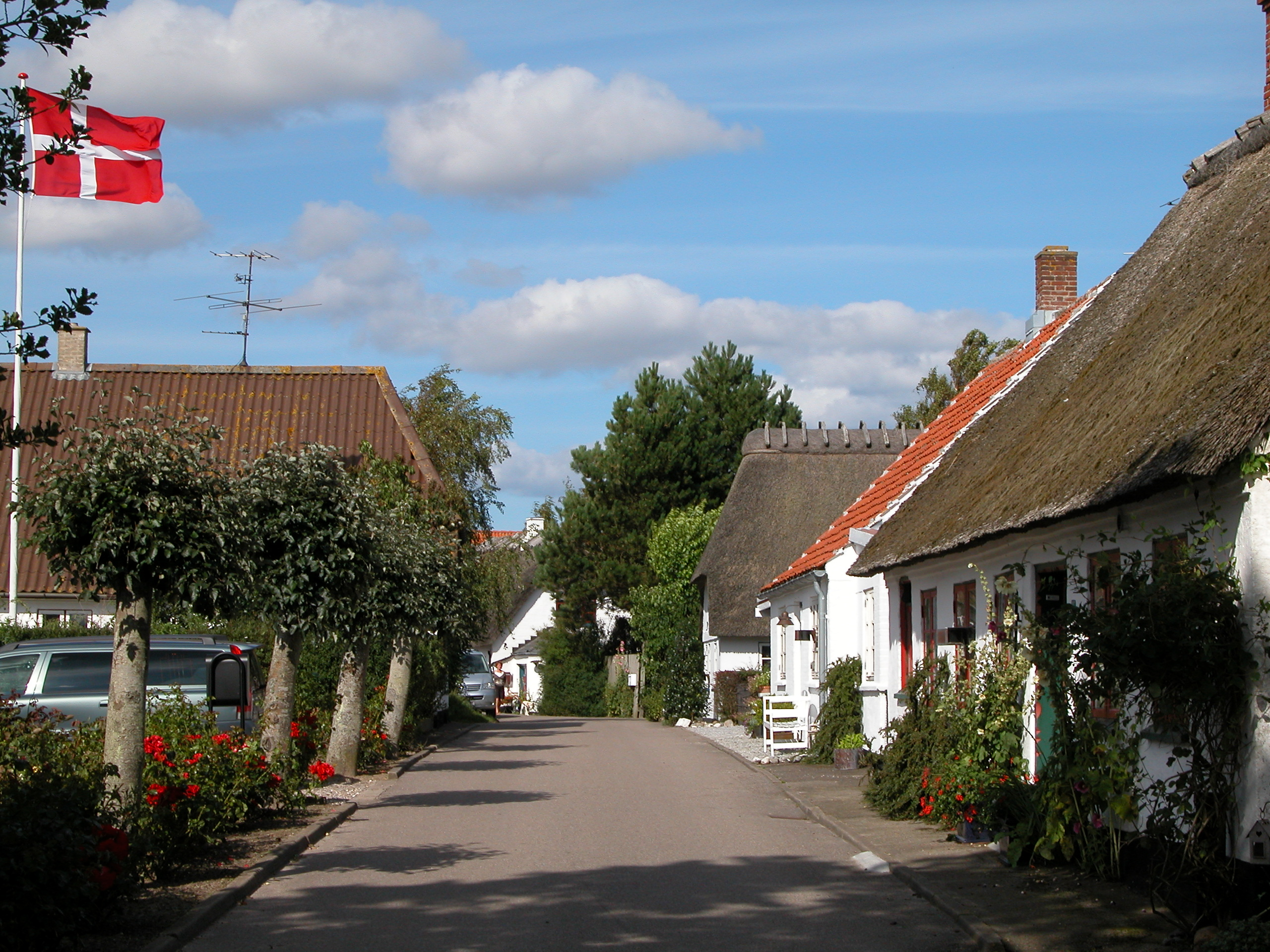
Sønderby

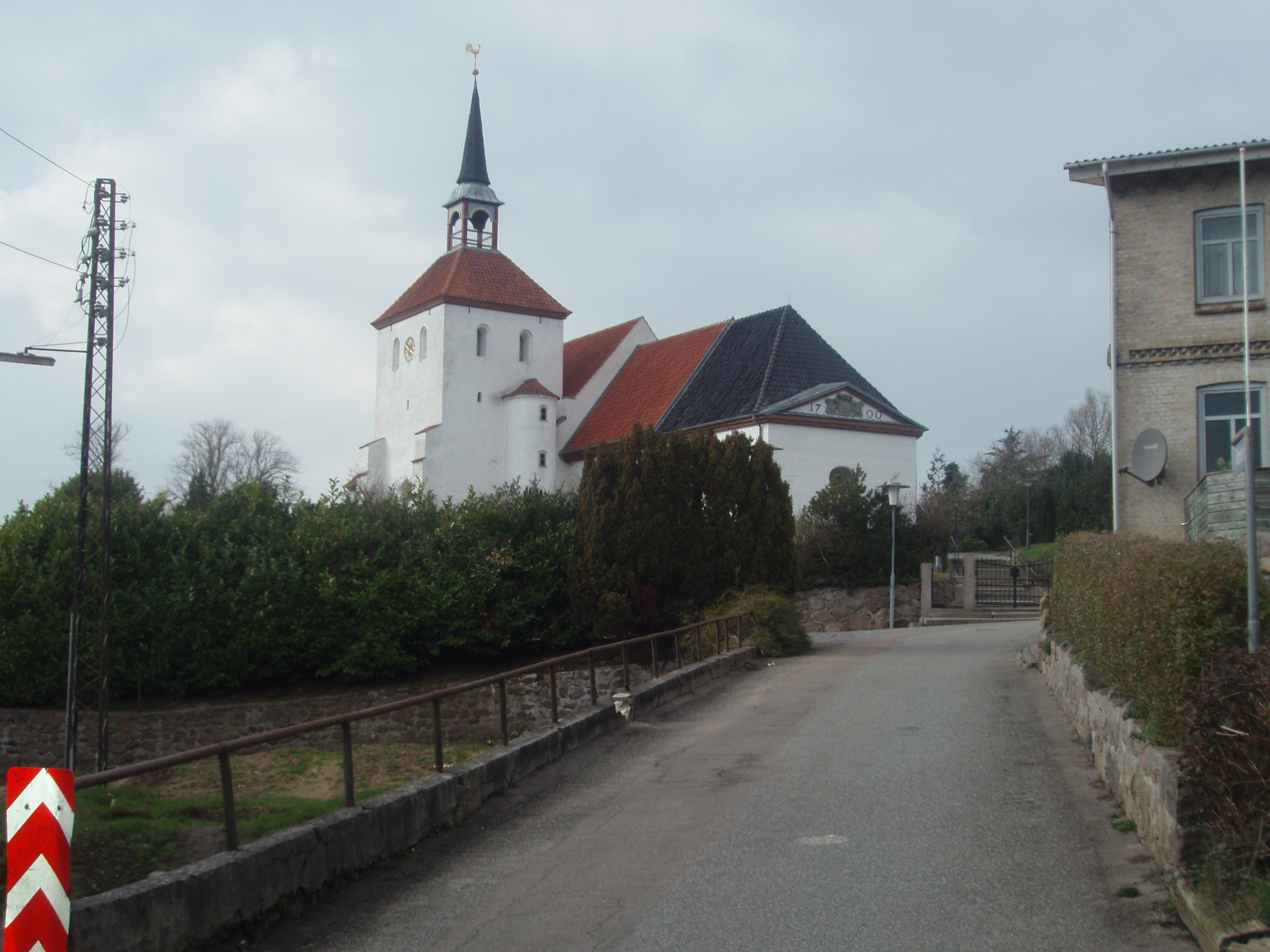
Nordborg Church

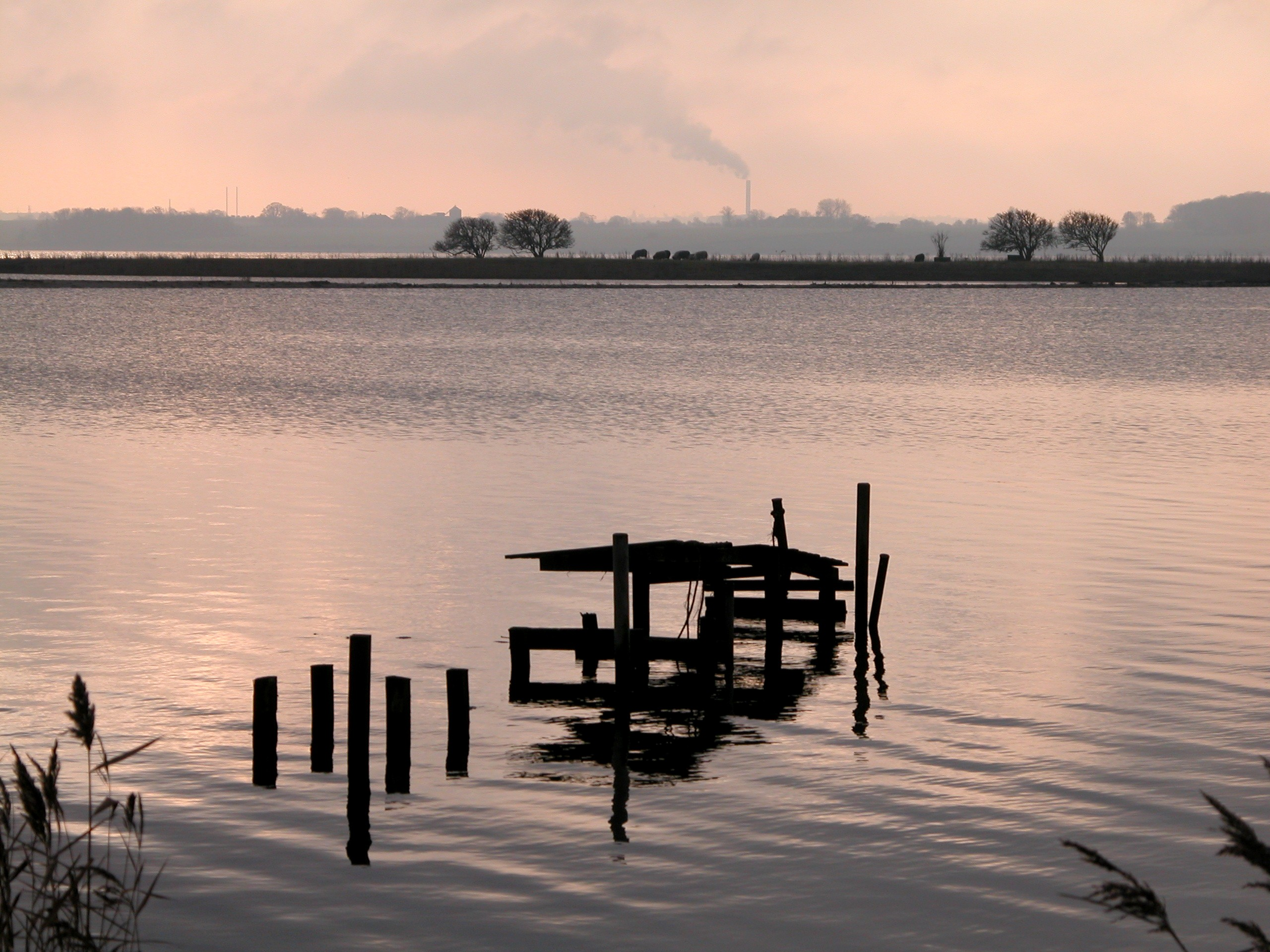
Katholm island

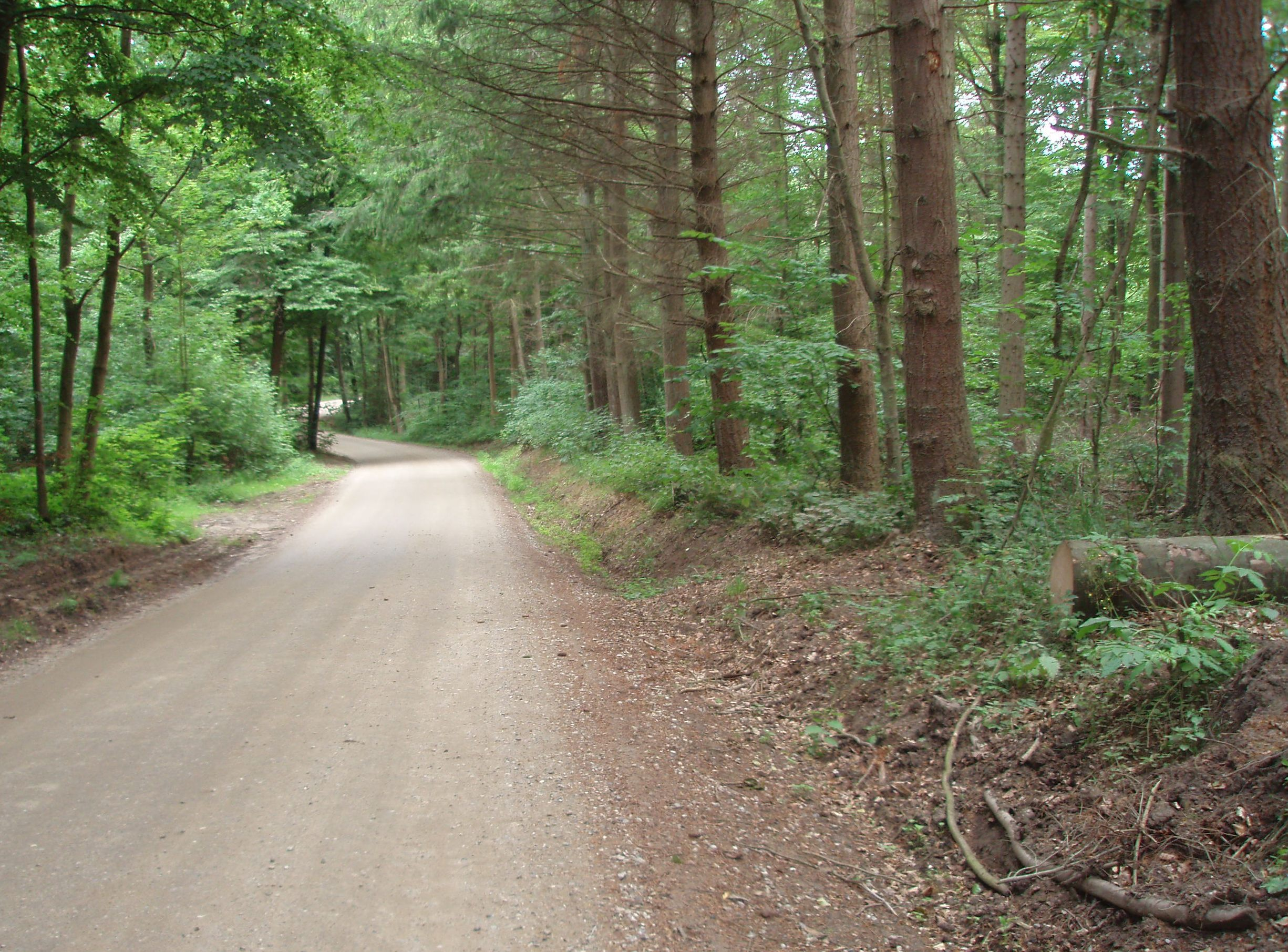
Nørreskoven in the north of Als

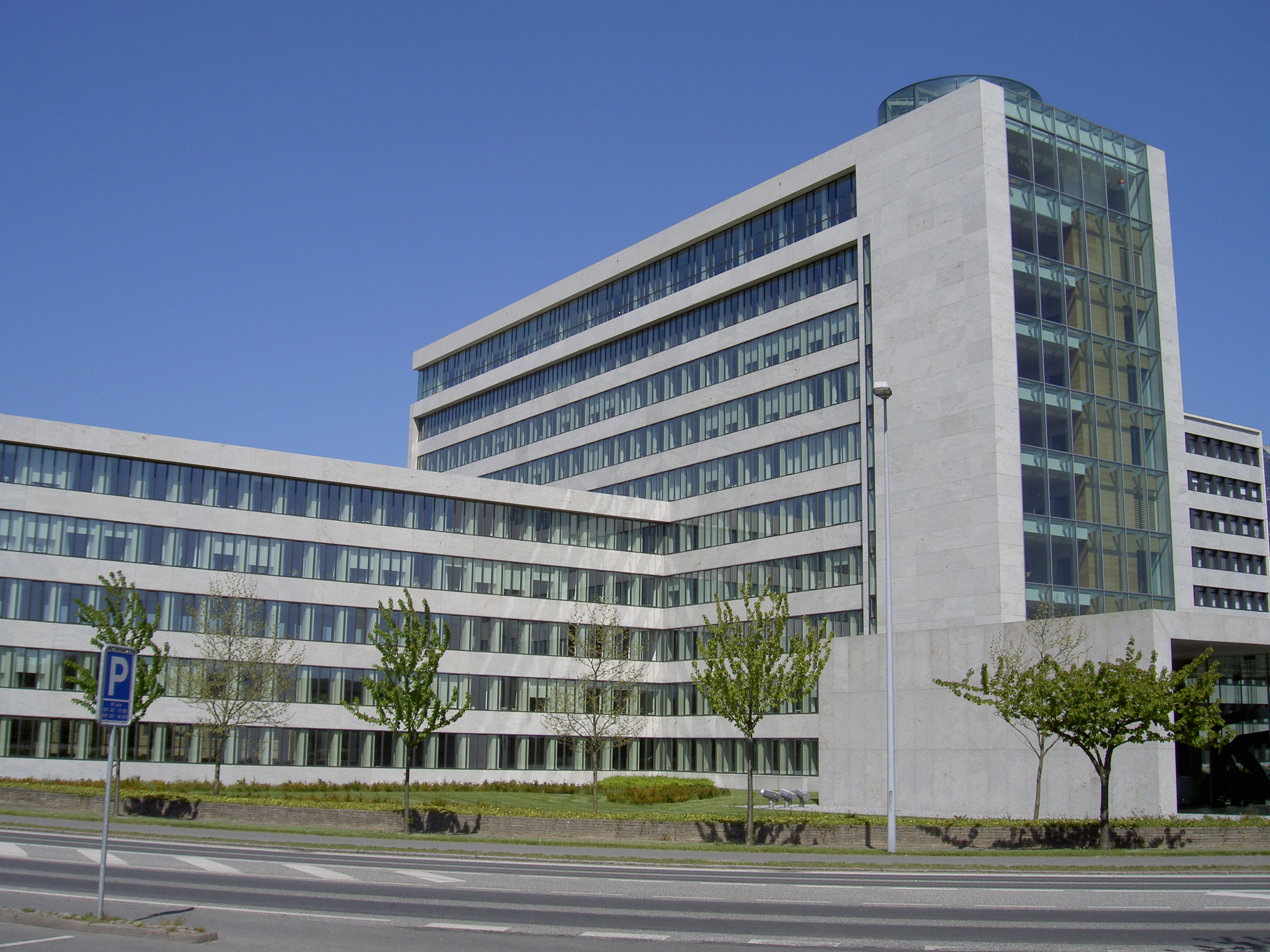
Danfoss headquarters at Nordborg

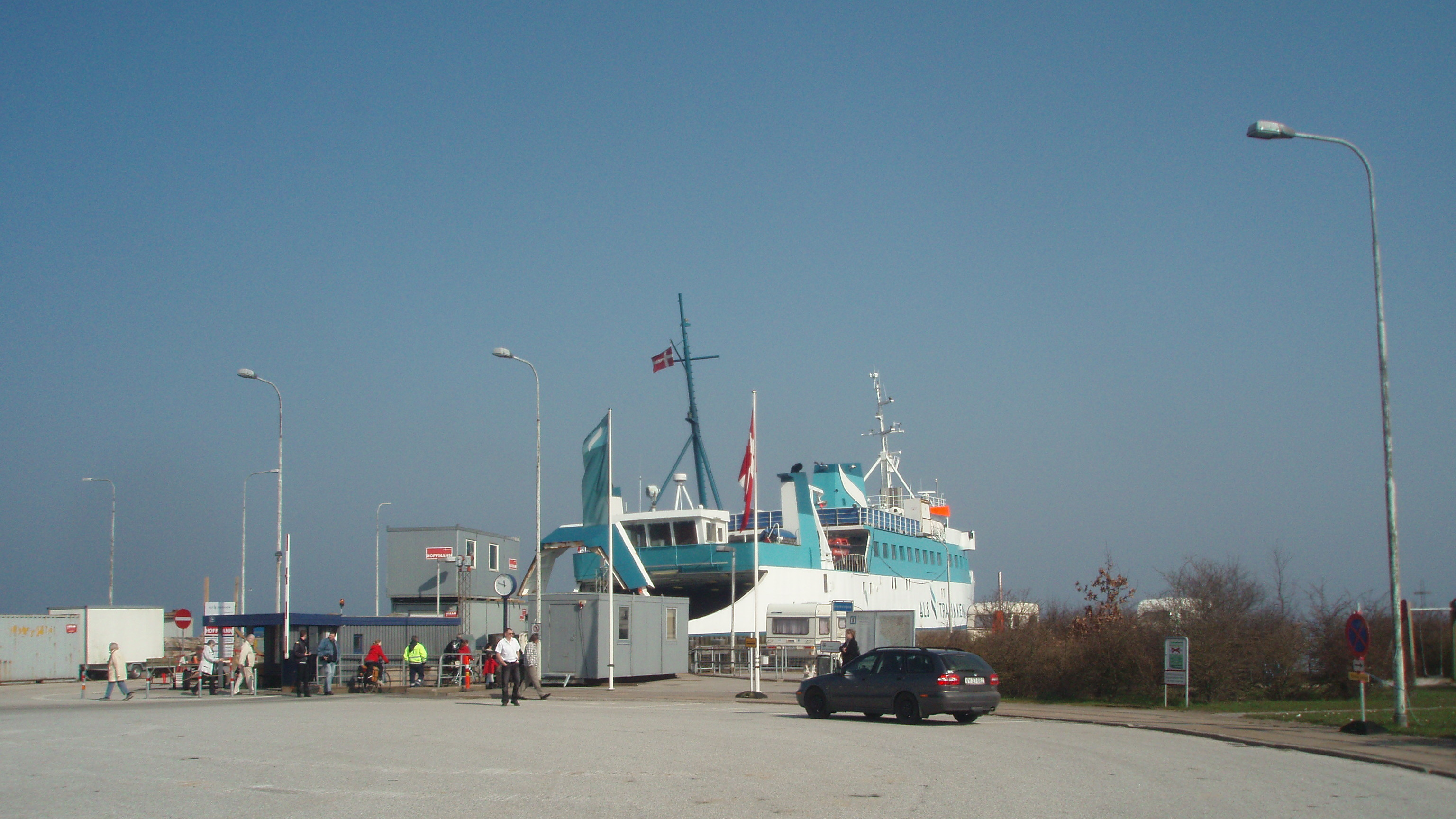
Ferry harbour at Fynshav

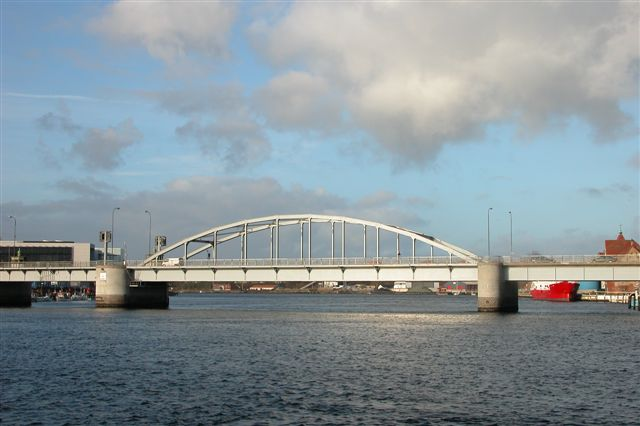
King Christian X's Bridge at Sønderborg

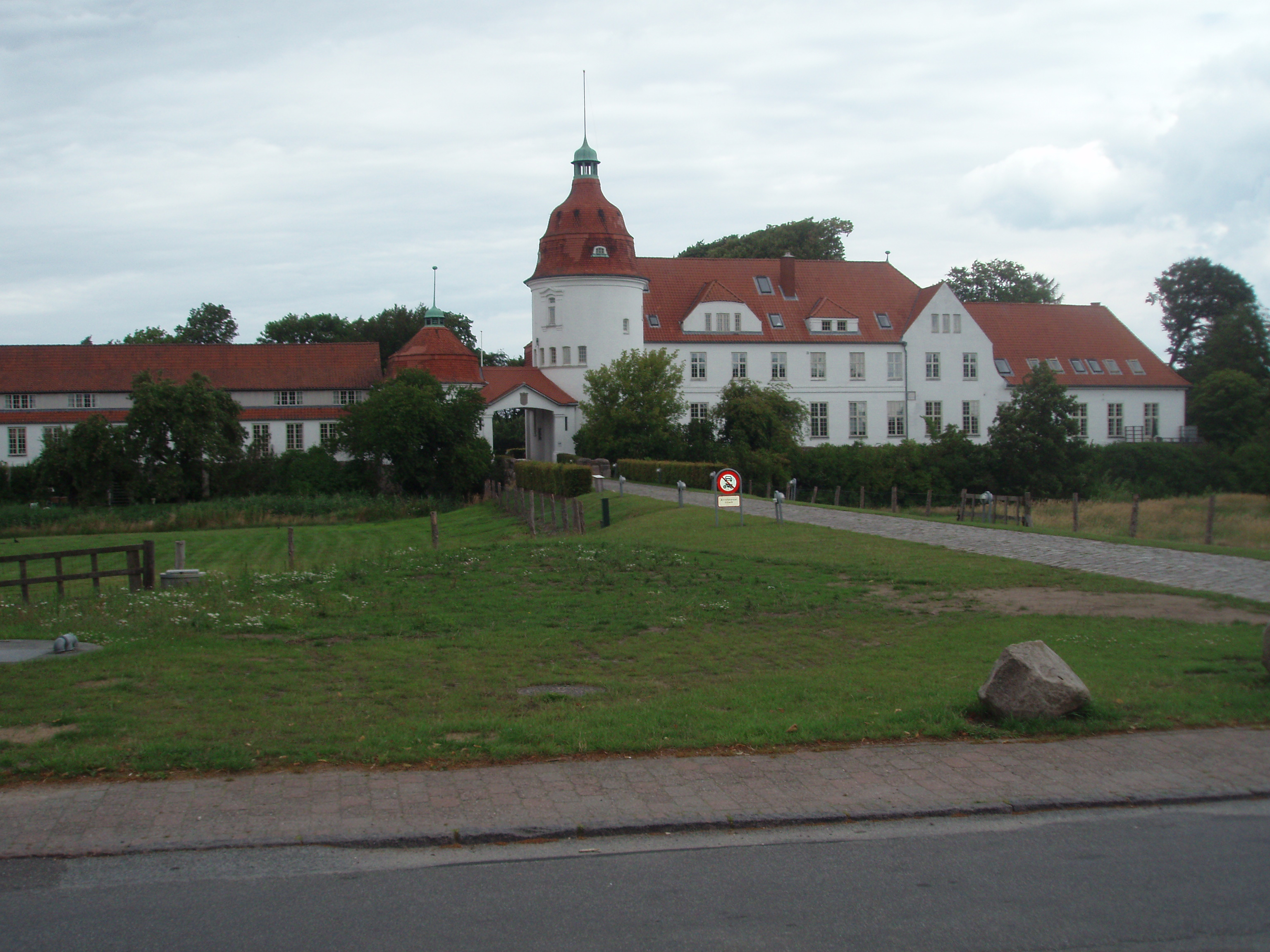
Nordborg Castle

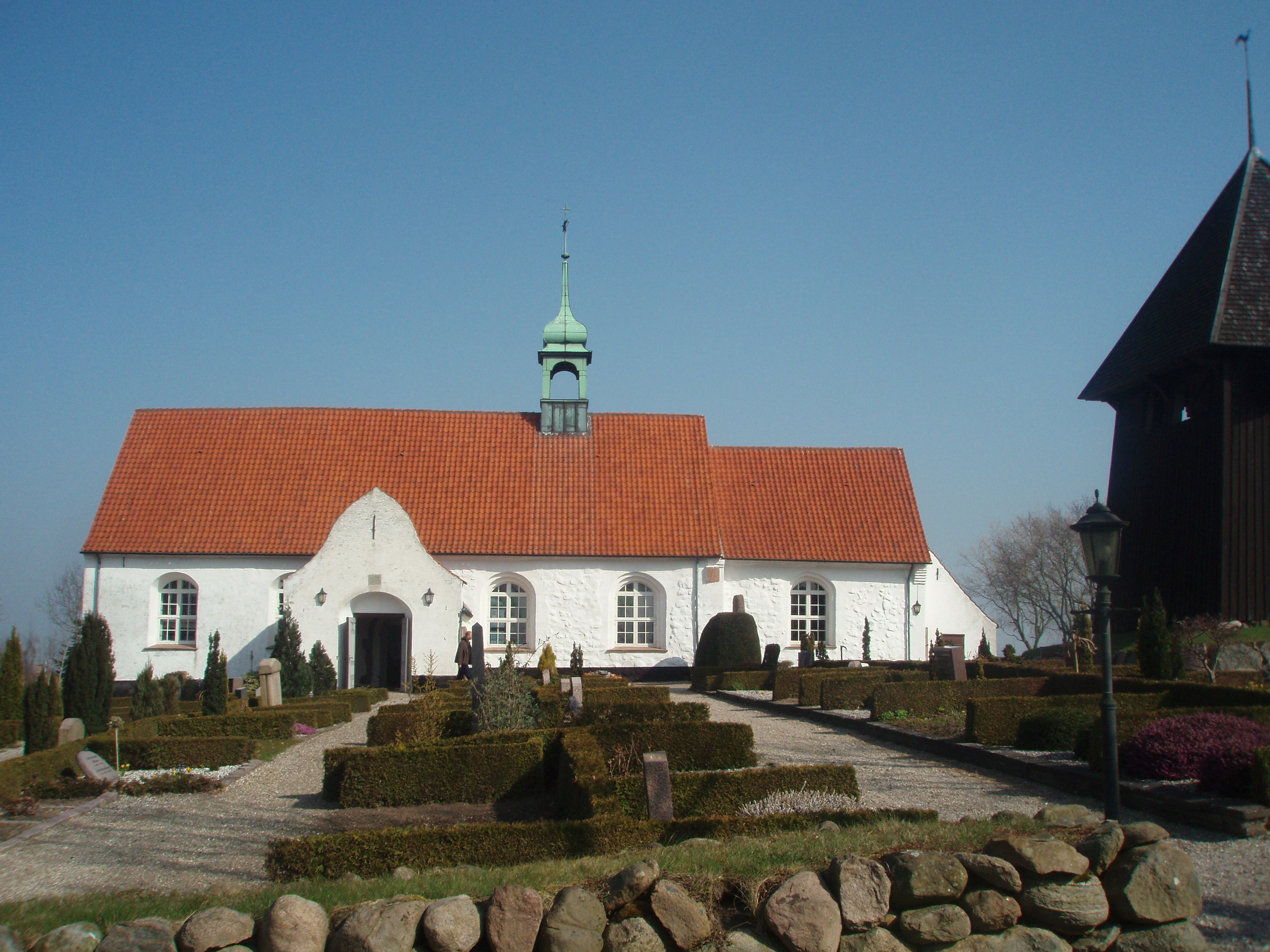
Svenstrup Church

== Notable people ==
- Vibeke Vasbo (born 1944 on Als) a Danish writer and women's rights and lgbt rights activist

== See also ==
- List of islands of Denmark
- Schleswig-Holstein Question

== Works cited ==
- Isacson, Claes-Göran [in Swedish] (2015). Karl X Gustavs krig: Fälttågen i Polen, Tyskland, Baltikum, Danmark och Sverige 1655-1660 [Wars of Charles X Gustav: The campaigns in Poland, Germany, the Baltics, Denmark and Sweden 1655-1660] (in Swedish). Historiska Media. pp. 146–155. ISBN 9789175450117.
