= Ernest August, Duke of Schleswig-Holstein-Sonderburg-Augustenburg =

Duke of Schleswig-Holstein-Sonderburg-Augustenburg

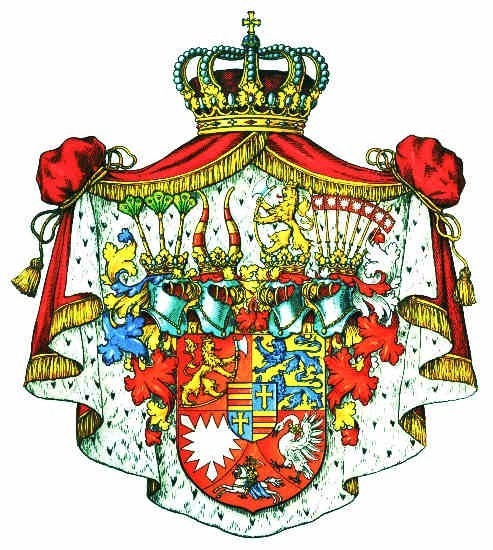
- Born: 30 October 1660
- Died: 12 March 1731 (aged 70)
- Noble family: House of Oldenburg
- Spouse: Maria Theresia of Weinberg
- Father: Ernest Günther, Duke of Schleswig-Holstein-Sonderburg-Augustenburg
- Mother: Auguste of Schleswig-Holstein-Sonderburg-Glücksburg

Ernest August, Duke of Schleswig-Holstein-Sonderburg-Augustenburg (30 October 1660 – 12 March 1731) was the third son of Duke Ernest Günther and his wife Auguste.

Ernest August converted to Catholicism and became a canon in Strasbourg. However, he later reverted to Lutheranism.

In 1692, he succeeded his childless brother Frederick as Duke of Augustenburg. In 1695 he married Baroness Maria Theresia of Weinberg (d. 1712). This marriage remained childless.

Ernest August, Duke of Schleswig-Holstein-Sonderburg-Augustenburg House of Oldenburg Born: 30 October 1660 Died: 12 March 1731
Preceded by Frederick	Duke of Schleswig-Holstein-Sonderburg-Augustenburg; 1692–1731	Succeeded by Christian August
