= Prince Frederick William of Schleswig-Holstein-Sonderburg-Augustenburg =

Prince Frederick William
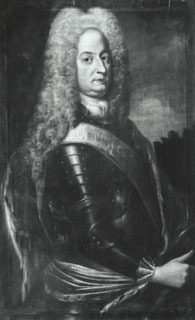
- Born: 18 November 1668; Sonderburg
- Died: 3 June 1714 (aged 45); Augustenburg
- Spouse: Sophie Amalie of Ahlefeldt
- Issue: Christian August I
- House: House of Schleswig-Holstein-Sonderburg-Augustenburg
- Father: Ernest Günther, Duke of Schleswig-Holstein-Sonderburg-Augustenburg
- Mother: Auguste of Schleswig-Holstein-Sonderburg-Glücksburg

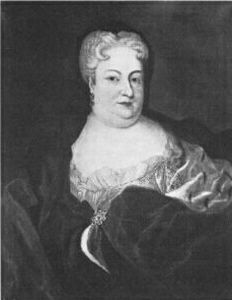
Duchess Sophie Amalie of Schleswig-Holstein-Sonderburg-Augustenburg

Prince Frederick William of Schleswig-Holstein-Sonderburg-Augustenburg (18 November 1668 – 3 June 1714) was a member of the House of Oldenburg and a Prince of Schleswig-Holstein-Sonderburg-Augustenburg.

== Biography ==
He was the youngest son of Duke Ernest Günther, Duke of Schleswig-Holstein-Sonderburg-Augustenburg and his wife, Auguste of Schleswig-Holstein-Sonderburg-Glücksburg. In 1675, when his father negotiated with Count Peder Griffenfeld about a marriage with Frederick William's sister, he was promised a profitable post as provost of the Cathedral in Hamburg and governor of Als. He was appointed as provost in Hamburg in 1676, after chairman Kielmansegge died. When his father died in 1689, the will stated that his possessions would go to his widow, who would have the right to settle the succession. She made a decision, which was upheld by the King in 1692. Her eldest living son, Ernest Augustus, was excluded from the inheritance, because he had converted to Catholicism, leaving the Duchy to Frederick William, who was by then the only other surviving son. Almost simultaneously, Frederick William was also appointed governor of Sønderborg.

However, when Ernest Augustus reverted to Lutheranism in 1695, he was appointed governor of Sønderborg, because he resided there. Ernest Augustus was also reinstated as heir of Schleswig-Holstein-Sonderburg-Augustenburg. Nevertheless, when Ernest Augustus died childless in 1731, Frederick William's son Christian August I would inherit the duchy.

When his mother died in 1701, Frederick William inherited Augustenborg Palace, Rumohrsgaard Manor and Evelgunde Manor. In 1703, he purchased Avnbølgaard Manor in Sundeved.

Frederick William served as a Major General in the Danish army.

== Personal life ==
On 27 November 1694, he married Countess Sophie Amalie of Ahlefeldt-Langeland (1675–1741), the youngest daughter of the Chancellor, Count Frederik of Ahlefeldt-Rixingen, Count of Langeland (1623–1686) by his second wife, Countess Marie Elisabeth of Leiningen-Dagsburg-Hartenburg (1648–1724). They had five children, two boys and three girls:

- Christian August I, Duke of Schleswig-Holstein-Sonderburg-Augustenburg (1696–1754), married Countess Frederikke Louise of Danneskiold-Samsøe (1699–1744); had issue
- Frederick Karl of Schleswig-Holstein-Sonderburg-Augustenburg (1701–1702)
- Charlotte Amalie Marie of Schleswig-Holstein-Sonderburg-Augustenburg, a nun in Herford (d. 1726)
- Sofie Luise of Schleswig-Holstein-Sonderburg-Augustenburg (1699–1765), didn't get married and had no issue
- Auguste Wilhelmine of Schleswig-Holstein-Sonderburg-Augustenburg, (b. and d. 8.7.1700)
