= Christian Augustus I of Schleswig-Holstein-Sonderburg-Augustenburg =

Christian August I, Duke of Schleswig-Holstein-Sonderburg-Augustenburg
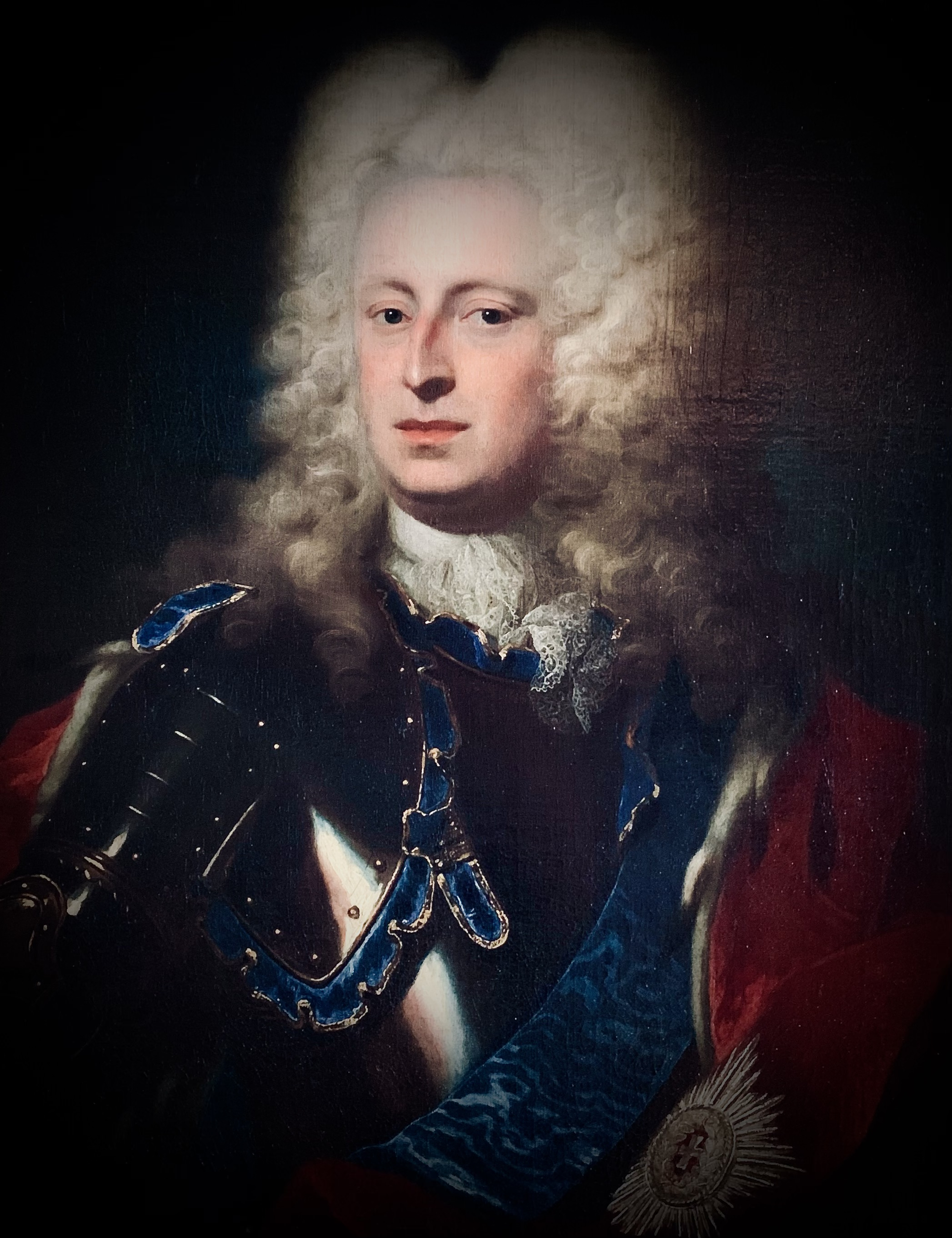
- Portrait by J.S. Wahl
- Born: 4 August 1696
- Died: 20 January 1754 (aged 57)
- Noble family: House of Oldenburg
- Spouse: Frederikke Louise Danneskiold-Samsøe
- Issue: Frederick Christian I, Duke of Schleswig-Holstein-Sonderburg-Augustenburg
- Father: Prince Frederick William of Schleswig-Holstein-Sonderburg-Augustenburg
- Mother: Countess Sophia Amalia of Ahlefeld-Rixingen

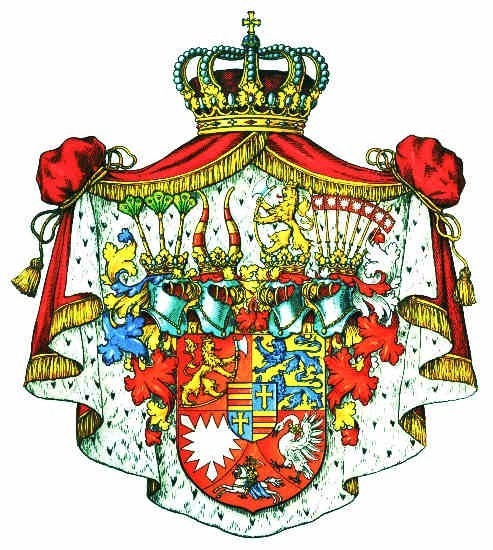
Coat of Arms of the Duke of Schleswig-Holstein

Christian August I, Duke of Schleswig-Holstein-Sonderburg-Augustenburg (4 August 1696 – 20 January 1754) was the duke of Schleswig-Holstein-Sonderburg-Augustenburg, member of a cadet branch of the House of Oldenburg.

== Biography ==
Christian August was a son of Frederick William of Schleswig-Holstein-Sonderburg-Augustenburg, who was himself a son of Ernest Günther, and his wife, Countess Sophie Amalie of Ahlefeld-Rixingen (1675-1741), herself a daughter of Count Frederick of Ahlefeldt-Rixingen. He served as provost of the cathedral chapter in Hamburg. Later, he became governor of the Danish island Als, then General of the Infantry and Colonel of the royal guards in Denmark. In 1731, Christian August I succeeded his childless uncle Ernest August.

== Marriage and issue ==
He married Countess Frederikke Louise of Danneskiold-Samsøe (1699–1744), the daughter of Count Christian Gyldenløve by his first wife and cousin, Countess Charlotte Amalie of Danneskiold-Laurvig (1682-1699). They had the following children:

- Frederick Christian I
- Emil August (1722–1786): Lieutenant General in the Danish army
- Christian Ulrich (1723)
- Sophie Charlotte (1725-1752)
- Christine Ulrike (1727–1794)
- Sofie Magdalene (1731–1799)
- unnamed (1732)
- Charlotte Amalie (1736–1815)
- unnamed (1736)

== Ancestry ==
Ancestors of Christian Augustus I of Schleswig-Holstein-Sonderburg-Augustenburg

16. John II, Duke of Schleswig-Holstein-Sonderburg (= 20)
8. Alexander, Duke of Schleswig-Holstein-Sonderburg
17. Elisabeth of Brunswick-Grubenhagen (= 21)
4. Ernest Günther, Duke of Schleswig-Holstein-Sonderburg-Augustenburg
18. John Günther I, Count of Schwarzburg-Sondershausen
9. Dorothea of Schwarzburg-Sondershausen
19. Anna of Oldenburg-Delmenhorst
2. Prince Frederick William of Schleswig-Holstein-Sonderburg-Augustenburg
20. John II, Duke of Schleswig-Holstein-Sonderburg (= 16)
10. Philip, Duke of Schleswig-Holstein-Sonderburg-Glücksburg
21. Elisabeth of Brunswick-Grubenhagen (= 17)
5. Auguste of Schleswig-Holstein-Sonderburg-Glücksburg
22. Francis II, Duke of Saxe-Lauenburg
11. Sophie Hedwig of Saxe-Lauenburg
23. Maria of Brunswick-Lüneburg
1. Christian August, Duke of Schleswig-Holstein-Sonderburg-Augustenburg
24. Frederick of Ahlefeld
12. Frederick of Ahlefeld
25. Dorothea Blome
6. Frederick, Count of Ahlefeldt-Rixingen-Langeland
26. Gregor of Ahlefeld
13. Brigitte of Ahlefeld
27. Metta Blome
3. Sofie Amalie of Ahlefeld-Langeland
28. John Philip II of Leiningen-Dagsburg-Hardenburg
14. Frederick Emich of Leiningen-Dagsburg-Hardenburg
29. Elisabeth of Leiningen-Dagsburg-Falkenburg
7. Marie Elisabeth of Leiningen-Dagsburg
30. Christian, Count of Waldeck-Wildungen
15. Sibylla of Waldeck-Wildungen
31. Elisabeth of Nassau-Siegen

Christian Augustus I of Schleswig-Holstein-Sonderburg-Augustenburg House of Oldenburg Born: 4 August 1696 Died: 20 January 1754
Preceded by Ernest August	Duke of Schleswig-Holstein-Sonderburg-Augustenburg; 1731–1754	Succeeded by Frederick Christian I
