= House of Schleswig-Holstein-Sonderburg-Augustenburg =

Noble family

- Parent house: House of Oldenburg
- Country: Denmark
- Founded: 1647; 379 years ago
- Founder: Ernest Günther
- Titles: Duke of Schleswig-Holstein-Sonderburg-Augustenburg; Duke of Schleswig-Holstein; Crown Prince of Sweden
- Dissolution: April 17, 1931; 95 years ago

The House of Schleswig-Holstein-Sonderburg-Augustenburg (Danish: Slesvig-Holsten-Sønderborg-Augustenborg) was a branch of the dukes of Schleswig-Holstein-Sonderburg of the House of Oldenburg. The line descended from Alexander, Duke of Schleswig-Holstein-Sonderburg. Like all of the secondary lines from the Sonderburg branch, the heads of the House of Schleswig-Holstein-Sonderburg-Augustenburg were first known as Dukes of Schleswig-Holstein and Dukes of Sonderburg. The family took its name from its ancestral home, Augustenborg Palace in Augustenborg, Denmark.

== History ==
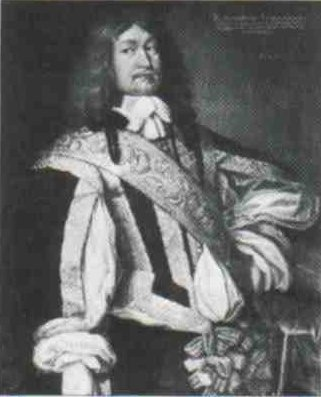
Duke Ernst Günther I, first Duke of Augustenburg (1609-1689).

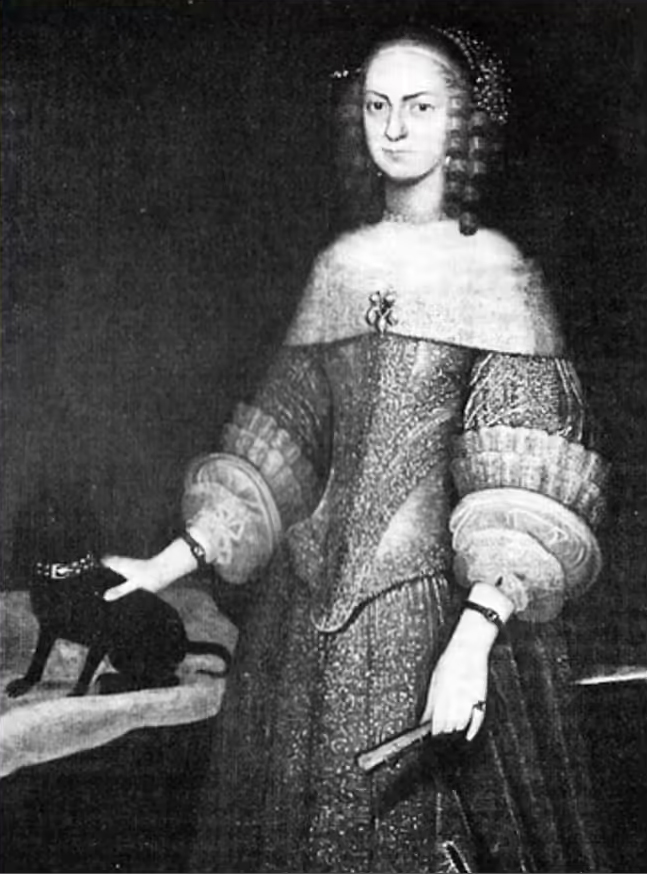
Auguste, the first Duchess of Augustenburg (1633-1701).

The branch originated from Ernest Günther, a member of the ducal house of Schleswig-Holstein (its branch of Sønderborg) and a cadet of the royal house of Denmark. He was the third son of Alexander, 2nd Duke of Sonderborg (1573–1627), and thus a grandson of John the Younger (1545–1622), the first duke, who was a son of King Christian III of Denmark.

Ernest Günther had a castle built in the years after 1651, which received the name of Augustenburg in honor of his wife, Auguste. She was also from a branch of the Dukes of Schleswig-Holstein as a daughter of Philip (1584–1663), Duke of Glücksburg. As that castle became the chief seat of their line, the family eventually used the name of Augustenborg as its branch name. As they were agnates of the ducal house, the title of duke belonged to every one of them (as is the Germanic custom).

The Dukes of Augustenburg were not sovereign rulers—they held their lands in fief to their dynastically-senior kinsmen, the sovereign Dukes of Schleswig and Holstein—who were the Oldenburg Kings of Denmark.

Later, a Danish king made the head of that line specifically Duke of Augustenburg. In the late 18th century, since 1764, the branch of Schleswig-Holsten-Sønderborg-Augustenburg was genealogically the next senior branch immediately after the main line of Danish kings. King Frederick VI of Denmark (or, rather, his chief adviser Andreas Peter Bernstorff), made his only sister Louise Auguste of Denmark marry the then Hereditary Prince Christian of Augustenburg.

In 1764, Sønderborg castle, the seat of that elder Schleswig-Holstein branch, passed upon its owners' extinction into the hands of the Duke of Augustenburg, but against expectations it did not become a residence (they remained at Augustenborg). Instead it was rented out as a warehouse. The penultimate Duke of Augustenburg, also named Ernst Günther, allowed Sønderborg County Museum to move into a part of the castle in 1920. The next year the Danish state bought the castle from the Duke.

In 1810, a younger scion of the family, Prince Christian August, was chosen as the Crown Prince of Sweden, and adopted by king Charles XIII of Sweden. An Augustenburg dynasty on a royal throne was however not to be, as Prince Christian August died a couple of months after his arrival in Sweden.

In the early 19th century, the Danish royal line started to go extinct. The Duke of Augustenburg was the next male-line heir to the royal house, though not descended in male line from Frederick III of Denmark and Norway. This made the duke a player in the convoluted Schleswig-Holstein Question, as well as a candidate in the Danish succession. Frederik August of Augustenburg attempted to proclaim himself reigning Duke Frederick VIII of Schleswig-Holstein in 1864, upon the final extinction of the senior branch of the Danish kings. His daughter, Augusta Victoria of Schleswig-Holstein, became German Empress as consort of Wilhelm II.

The ducal line died out in 1931. In November 1920, its penultimate head had adopted Prince Johann Georg of Schleswig-Holstein-Sonderburg-Glücksburg and his sister Princess Marie Luise, children of Prince Albrecht of Schleswig-Holstein-Sonderburg-Glücksburg. After Augustenborg's extinction in 1931, seniority fell to the line of the Dukes of Glücksburg, heads of the second line of Holstein, known in German as Schleswig-Holstein-Sonderburg-Glücksburg and in Danish as Slesvig-Holsten-Sønderborg-Lyksborg.

== List of Dukes ==
Dukes of Schleswig-Holstein-Sonderburg-Augustenburg

- Ernest Günther, (1647–1689)
- Frederick (1689–1692), son
- Ernest August (1692–1731), brother
- Christian August I (1731–1754), nephew
- Frederik Christian I (1754–1794), son
- Frederik Christian II (1794–1814), son
- Christian August II (1814–1869), son

Dukes of Schleswig-Holstein

- Frederik VIII August (1863–1880), son

Frederick proclaimed himself Duke of Schleswig-Holstein in 1863, but did not obtain sovereign possession.

- Ernest Günther II (1880–1921), son
- Albert (1921–1931), cousin

Like the kings of the earlier Oldenburg line, of which the House of Glücksburg is a cadet branch, monarchs of the Glücksburg dynasty in Denmark also bore the titles of Dukes of Schleswig and Holstein. Margrethe II of Denmark abandoned this tradition upon ascending the Danish throne in 1972.
