= Princess Augusta of Schleswig-Holstein-Sonderburg-Glücksburg =

Duchess consort of Schleswig-Holstein-Sonderburg-Augustenburg (1633–1701)

Princess Augusta
- Duchess consort of Schleswig-Holstein-Sonderburg-Augustenburg
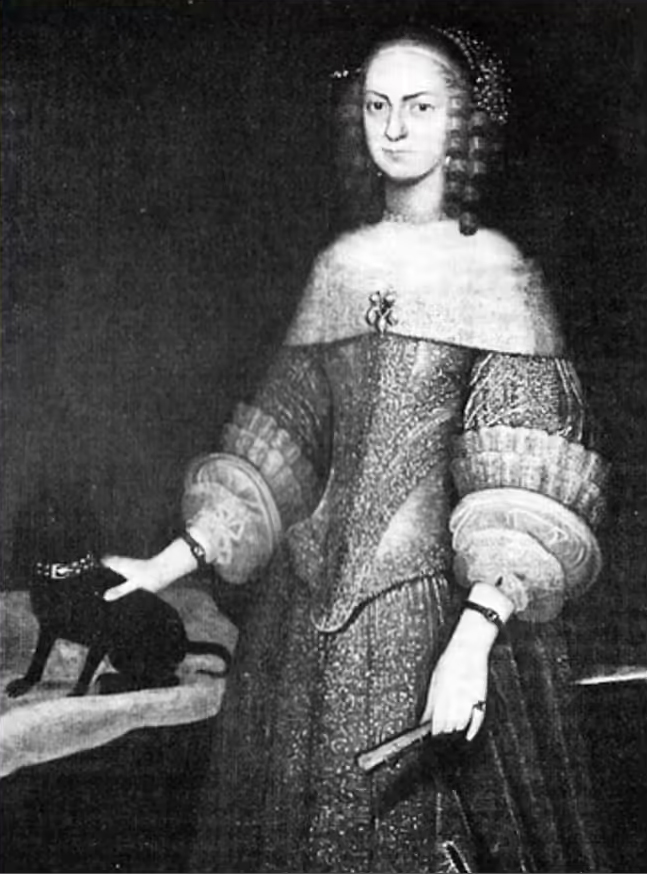
- 17th-century portrait
- Born: 27 June 1633; Glücksburg
- Died: 26 May 1701 (aged 67); Augustenborg Palace, Denmark
- Spouse: Ernest Günther, Duke of Schleswig-Holstein-Sonderburg-Augustenburg
- Issue: Frederick; Princess Sophie Amalie; Prince Philipp Ernst; Princess Sophie Auguste; Louise Charlotte, Duchess of Beck; Princess Ernestine Justine; Ernest Augustus; Dorothea Louise, Princess-Abbess of Itzehoe; Prince Frederick William
- House: House of Schleswig-Holstein-Sonderburg-Glücksburg (by birth); House of Schleswig-Holstein-Sonderburg-Augustenburg (by marriage)
- Father: Philip, Duke of Schleswig-Holstein-Sonderburg-Glücksburg
- Mother: Sophie Hedwig of Saxe-Lauenburg

Princess Augusta of Schleswig-Holstein-Sonderburg-Glücksburg (27 June 1633 – 26 May 1701) was a Danish-German princess of the senior Glücksburg line of the Duke of Schleswig-Holstein. She was the first Duchess of Augustenburg by marriage. Augustenborg Palace, and as a consequence the nearby town, were named in honor of her.

== Early life and ancestry ==
The great-granddaughter of king Christian III of Denmark, she was the third daughter, eighth by birth, of Philip, Duke of Schleswig-Holstein-Sonderburg-Glücksburg and Princess Sophia Hedwig of Saxe-Lauenburg. She was sister of Sophia Dorothea of Schleswig-Holstein-Sonderburg-Glücksburg

== Family and children ==
On 15 June 1651, at Copenhagen, she married her first cousin Ernest Günther, son of Duke Alexander of Schleswig-Holstein-Sonderburg and his wife Countess Dorothea of Schwarzburg-Sondershausen. They had ten children:

1. Frederick (10 December 1652 – 3 August 1692)
2. Sofie Amalie (25 August 1654 – 7 December 1655)
3. Philipp Ernst (24 October 1655 – 8 September 1677)
4. Sofie Auguste (2 February 1657 – 20 July 1657)
5. Luise Charlotte (13 April 1658 – 2 May 1740), married on 1 January 1685 to Duke Frederick Louis of Holstein-Sonderburg-Beck
6. Ernestine Justine (30 July 1659 – 18 October 1662)
7. Ernest Augustus (3 October 1660 – 11 May 1731)
8. Dorothea Luise (11 October 1663 – 21 April 1721), Abbess of Itzehoe in 1686–1721
9. a child, born and died 18 December 1665
10. Frederick William (18 November 1668 – 3 June 1714)

== Ancestry ==
Ancestors of Princess Augusta of Schleswig-Holstein-Sonderburg-Glücksburg

16. Frederick I of Denmark
8. Christian III of Denmark
17. Anna of Brandenburg
4. John II, Duke of Schleswig-Holstein-Sonderburg
18. Magnus I, Duke of Saxe-Lauenburg
9. Dorothea of Saxe-Lauenburg
19. Catherine of Brunswick-Wolfenbüttel
2. Philip, Duke of Schleswig-Holstein-Sonderburg-Glücksburg
20. Philip I, Duke of Brunswick-Grubenhagen
10. Ernest III, Duke of Brunswick-Grubenhagen
21. Katharina of Mansfeld-Vorderort
5. Elisabeth of Brunswick-Grubenhagen
22. George I, Duke of Pomerania-Wolgast
11. Margarethe of Pomerania-Wolgast
23. Amalie of the Palatinate
1. Augusta of Schleswig-Holstein-Sonderburg-Glücksburg
24. Magnus I, Duke of Saxe-Lauenburg
12. Francis I, Duke of Saxe-Lauenburg
25. Catherine of Brunswick-Wolfenbüttel
6. Francis II, Duke of Saxe-Lauenburg
26. Henry IV, Duke of Saxony
13. Sibylle of Saxony
27. Catherine of Mecklenburg
3. Sophia Hedwig of Saxe-Lauenburg
28. Henry V, Duke of Brunswick-Lüneburg
14. Julius, Duke of Brunswick-Lüneburg
29. Maria of Württemberg
7. Maria of Brunswick-Lüneburg
30. Joachim II, Elector of Brandenburg
15. Hedwig of Brandenburg, Duchess of Brunswick-Wolfenbüttel
31. Hedwig Jagiellon

Princess Augusta of Schleswig-Holstein-Sonderburg-Glücksburg House of Schleswig-Holstein-Sonderburg-Glücksburg Cadet branch of the House of Oldenburg Born: 27 June 1633 Died: 26 May 1701
Royal titles
Preceded by New Title	Duchess consort of Schleswig-Holstein-Sonderburg-Augustenburg; 1651 – 1689	Succeeded by Marie Therese of Velbrück
