= Ernest Gunther I of Schleswig-Holstein-Sonderburg-Augustenburg =

Ernest Günther
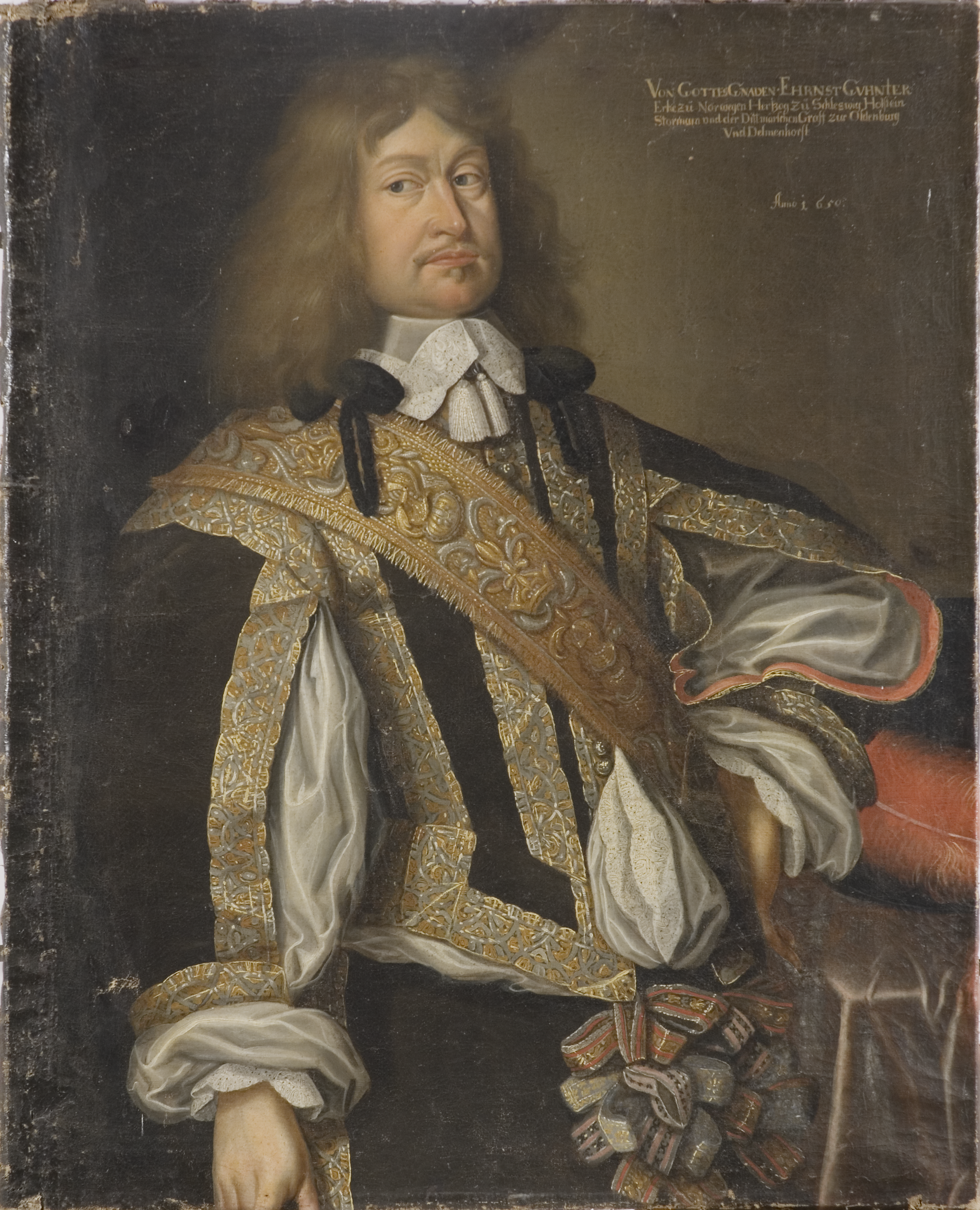
- Portrait of Ernest Günther, 1650

Duke of Schleswig-Holstein-Sonderburg-Augustenburg
- Reign: 13 May 1627 - 18 January 1689
- Successor: Frederick
- Born: 14 October 1609; Haus Beck, Westphalia, Holy Roman Empire
- Died: 18 January 1689 (aged 79); Augustenborg Palace, Duchy of Schleswig
- Spouse: Augusta of Schleswig-Holstein-Sonderburg-Glücksburg
- Issue: Frederick; Princess Sophie Amalie; Prince Philipp Ernst; Princess Sophie Auguste; Louise Charlotte, Duchess of Beck; Princess Ernestine Justine; Ernest August; Dorothea Louise, Princess-Abbess of Itzehoe; Prince Frederick William
- House: House of Schleswig-Holstein-Sonderburg-Augustenburg
- Father: Alexander, Duke of Schleswig-Holstein-Sonderburg
- Mother: Dorothea of Schwarzburg-Sondershausen

Ernest Günther I of Schleswig-Holstein-Sonderburg-Augustenburg (14 October 1609 – 18 January 1689) was a Duke of Schleswig-Holstein of its Sonderburg line. He was the first to have his ducal seat in Augustenborg Palace, which he built and named in honor of his wife. He ruled from 1647 until his death in 1689.

== Early life ==
Ernest Günther was born on 14 October 1609 at Haus Beck near Minden in Westphalia as the third son of Alexander, Duke of Schleswig-Holstein-Sonderburg and his wife, Countess Dorothea of Schwarzburg-Sondershausen. His father was the eldest son of John the Younger of Schleswig-Holstein-Sonderburg, who himself was a younger son of King Christian III of Denmark-Norway. Ernest Günther thus belonged to a junior branch of the House of Oldenburg which had ruled Denmark since 1448.

== Family and children ==
On 15 June 1651 he married Princess Auguste of Schleswig-Holstein-Sonderburg-Glücksburg, daughter of Duke Philipp of Schleswig-Holstein-Sonderburg-Glücksburg and his wife, Princess Sophie Hedwig of Saxe-Lauenburg. They had ten children:

1. Frederick (10 December 1652 – 3 August 1692)
2. Sophie Amalie (25 August 1654 – 7 December 1655)
3. Philip Ernest (24 October 1655 – 8 September 1677)
4. Sophie Auguste (2 February 1657 – 20 July 1657)
5. Louise Charlotte (13 April 1658 – 2 May 1740), married on 1 January 1685 to Duke Frederick Louis of Holstein-Sonderburg-Beck
6. Ernestine Justine (30 July 1659 – 18 October 1662)
7. Ernest August (3 October 1660 – 11 May 1731)
8. Dorothea Louise (11 October 1663 – 21 April 1721), Abbess of Itzehoe in 1686-1721
9. a child, born and died 18 December 1665
10. Frederick William (18 November 1668 – 3 June 1714)
