= Ahrensbök Charterhouse =

Carthusian monastery in Holstein, Germany

Coordinates: 54.0122°N 10.5717°E

- Kartause Ahrensbök (German)
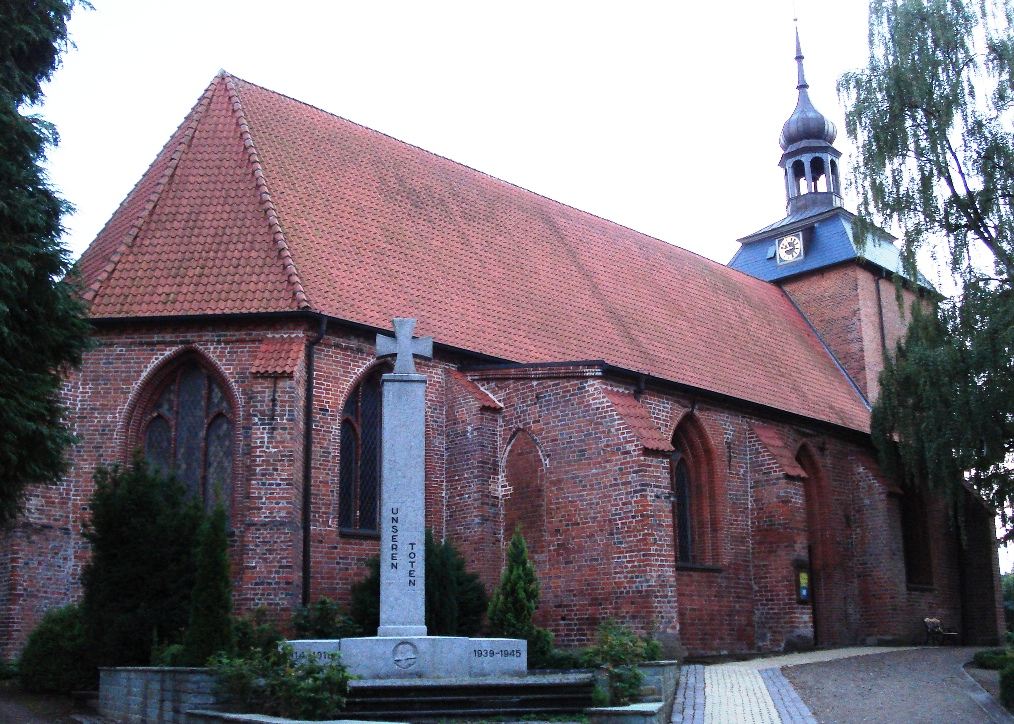
- The former Carthusian church in Ahrensbök, now the Marienkirche
- Interactive map of Ahrensbök Charterhouse
- Type: Carthusian monastery
- Location: Ahrensbök in Holstein, Germany

History
- Built: 1397
- Abandoned: 1593–1601
- Event: 1584 Secularization

Site notes
- Condition: Demolished (church is preserved)
- Building materials reused for Schloss Hoppenbrook

Ahrensbök Charterhouse (German: Kartause Ahrensbök) was a Carthusian monastery, or charterhouse, in Ahrensbök in Holstein, Germany.

== History ==
=== Monastery ===
The charterhouse was established in 1397. The estates with which it was endowed reached as far as Scharbeutz on the Bay of Lübeck.

During the Reformation the monastery was secularised, and with its estates fell into the hands of John II, Duke of Schleswig-Holstein-Sonderburg, in 1584, who had the buildings demolished.

=== Castle ===
The building materials were used between 1593 and 1601 for the construction of the castle in Ahrensbök, Schloss Hoppenbrook, which was the principal residence between 1623 and 1636 of the ruler of the newly formed Duchy of Schleswig-Holstein-Sonderburg-Plön while Duke Joachim Ernst I's new castle in Plön (Schloss Plön) was under construction. Once Schloss Plön was finished, the ducal residence was moved there from Ahrensbök, leaving Schloss Hoppenbrook as a secondary residence.

After the death there in 1740 of Duchess Juliana Luise, widow of Joachim Frederick, Duke of Schleswig-Holstein-Sonderburg-Plön, Schloss Hoppenbrook was demolished. The Rathaus of Ahrensbök now stands on its site, in a park in which ditches from the previous castle complex can still be made out.

== Monastery church ==
The only surviving building from the time of the Carthusians is the Brick Gothic St. Mary's church - Marienkirche - which in fact was begun in the first quarter of the 14th century and thus predates the monastery itself: when the charterhouse was established it was taken over for use as the monastery church. It was extended several times, and in 1400 the polygonal choir was added. The tower, with an inscribed sandstone tablet over the portal, was not added until 1761.

== Sources ==
- Jarchov, Otto, 1978: Die Klostergrundherrschaft Ahrensbök, in Jahrbuch für Heimatkunde, Eutin 1978, pp. 30–38
- Neugebauer, W., 1957: Schönes Holstein, pp. 84–85. Lübecker Nachrichten: Lübeck
- Rönnpag, Otto, 1992: Das Kartäuserkloster in Ahrensbök, in Jahrbuch für Heimatkunde, Eutin 1992, pp. 88–92
