= Schleswig-Holstein-Sonderburg =

Noble family

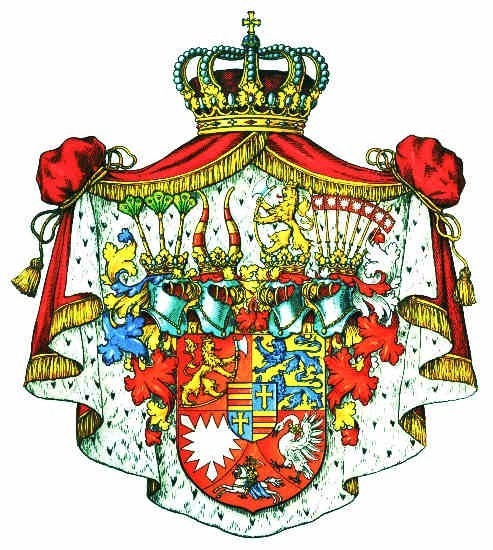
Coat of arms of the Dukes of Schleswig-Holstein-Sonderburg

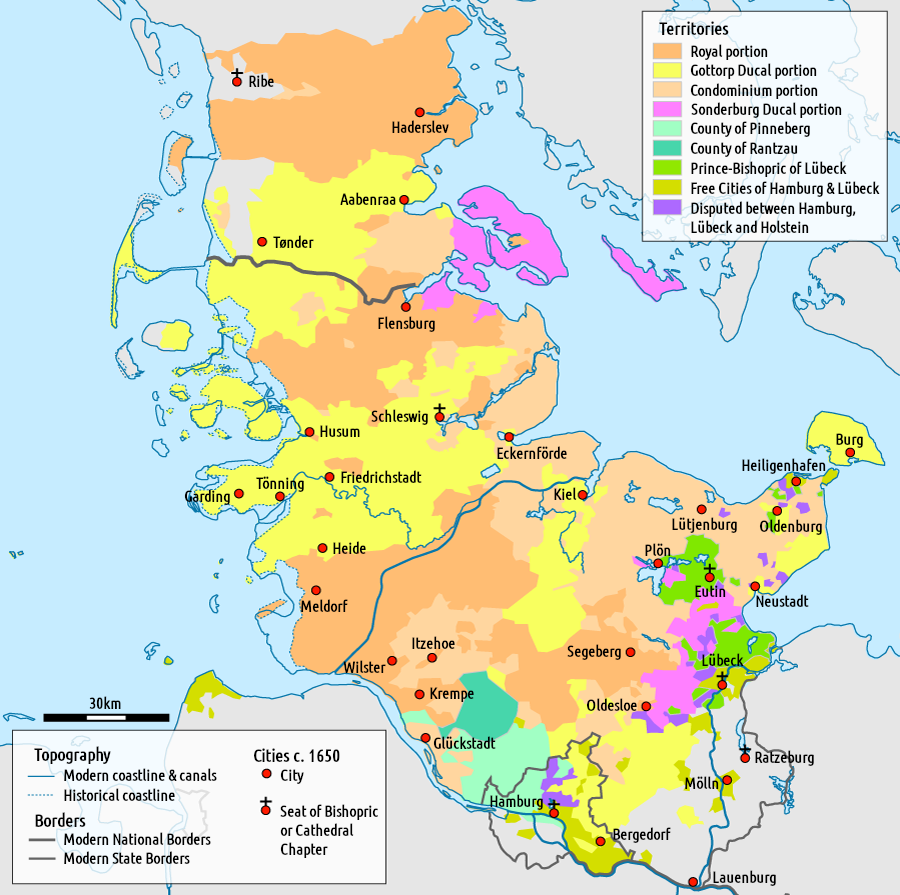
Schleswig and Holstein around 1650: the estates of the Sonderburg lines were divided into regions around the Danish island of Als and the regions south of Plön

Schleswig-Holstein-Sonderburg was the name of a branch line of the House of Oldenburg as well as the name of their land. It existed from 1564 until 1668 and was a titular duchy under the King of Denmark, rather than a true territorial dukedom in its own right. The seat of the duke was Sønderborg. Parts of the domain were located in Denmark (in the Duchy of Schleswig), mainly on the islands of Als and Ærø and around Glücksburg, whilst other lands were part of the Holy Roman Empire (in the Duchy of Holstein), including the Ämter of Plön, Ahrensbök, and Reinfeld. As a result of various inheritance arrangements it fragmented into numerous small territories which were eventually absorbed into Greater Denmark in the 18th century.

== History ==
=== Background ===
The ducal family was related to the House of Schleswig-Holstein-Gottorp; both belonged to the House of Oldenburg. The duchy was created in the 16th century when King Frederick II of Denmark shared his part of the duchies of Schleswig and Holstein with his two brothers, each receiving a third of the royal estate in Schleswig and Holstein. Sonderburg was the portion received by Duke John III, called "the Younger". His domain included inter alia the territories of Sonderburg, Norburg, Ærø, Plön and Ahrensbök together with their assigned Ämter or administrative offices. However, the division was not recognized by the local nobles, who considered it illegal, and the new duchy was managed by Duke John as a so-called abgeteilter Herr, i.e. a ruler who did not have the consent of his local landlords. So, while the Duke of Sonderburg received the ducal title and the income from the territory assigned to him, he did not have political rights in this territory. Sovereignty remained with the King of Denmark in his role as Duke of Schleswig-Holstein.

=== Fragmentation ===
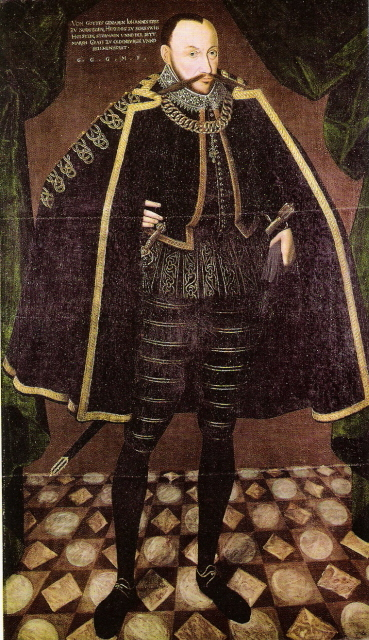
The Duchy of Schleswig-Holstein-Sonderburg was founded by John III and fragmented after his death into numerous mini-states

The dukes of Schleswig-Holstein-Sonderburg repeatedly split their possessions among their heirs, so that a variety of very small territories came into existence.

After the death of Duke John in 1622, the duchy was divided among those sons who were legal heirs and the House of Schleswig-Holstein-Sonderburg produced several collateral lines. The names of the individual lines added the name of their respective Residenz town to the family line. The sons of Duke Alexander — a son of Duke John — also received or acquired some territories outside of Schleswig-Holstein to sustain themselves.

Some of the newly created sub-duchies only had a few square kilometres of land and their masters were merely titular dukes. These new lines sometimes only lasted for a short time before their estates passed to other lines as a result of inheritance or bankruptcy, or even went back to the Danish royal house.

1. The House of Schleswig-Holstein-Sonderburg was continued by Duke Alexander, who resided at Sønderborg Castle. After a bankruptcy in 1667 the Sonderburg portion of the duchy reverted to the King of Denmark. The cadet lines that emerged from this line included the following:
  1. The line of Schleswig-Holstein-Sonderburg-Franzhagen based on Franzhagen Castle near Schulendorf, founded by Duke Hans Christian.
  2. The so-called Catholic line of Schleswig-Holstein-Sonderburg, founded by Duke Alexander Henry.
  3. The line of Schleswig-Holstein-Sonderburg-Wiesenburg based on Wiesenburg Castle in Saxony, founded by Duke Philip Louis.
  4. The line of Schleswig-Holstein-Sonderburg-Augustenburg, founded by Duke Ernest Günther who resided in the Augustenburg Palace. The line became extinct in 1931, its most famous member being Augusta Victoria, the last German Empress.
  5. The line of Schleswig-Holstein-Sonderburg-Beck, founded by Duke Augustus Philip. The following branch later emerged from this line:
    1. The younger line of the House of Schleswig-Holstein-Sonderburg-Glücksburg, now usually referred to as the House of Glücksburg. Founded in 1825 by a descendant of John III, Duke Frederick William. Family members of this branch up to the present day are members of the European aristocracy and include the current royal houses of Denmark and Norway, as well as Prince Philip, Duke of Edinburgh, the prince consort of Queen Elizabeth II.
2. The older line of Schleswig-Holstein-Sonderburg-Glücksburg, founded by Duke Philip, who resided in Glücksburg Castle in Glücksburg. The line died out in 1779.
3. The line of Schleswig-Holstein-Sonderburg-Ærø, founded by Duke Christian, who resided in Ærøskøbing. Duke Christian died without descendants in 1633 and his estate was divided amongst the other sons of John III.
4. The line of Schleswig-Holstein-Sonderburg-Plön founded in 1623 by Duke Joachim Ernest, residing in Plön Castle in Plön. The line died out in 1761. From it the following branches emerged:
  1. The line of Schleswig-Holstein-Sonderburg-Plön-Rethwisch founded by Joachim Ernest II, resident in Rethwisch. This line died out as early as 1729.
  2. The younger line of Schleswig-Holstein-Sonderburg-Norburg founded by Duke Augustus of Schleswig-Holstein-Sonderburg-Plön-Norburg. This line was reunited with the Duchy of Plön by Duke Joachim Frederick in 1706.
5. The older line of Schleswig-Holstein-Sonderburg-Norburg, founded by Duke John Adolphus, resident at Nordborg Castle on the island of Alsen. After going bankrupt in 1669 it was repossessed by the Plön branch in 1679.

In 1668, the king of Denmark confiscated Sonderburg because of excessive debt. Several of the lines that had split off from Sonderburg continued to exist, however. From the money that was left after all debts were paid, the last duke of Sonderburg bought properties in Franzhagen near Schulendorf; henceforth the line was known as Franzhagen.

== Genealogy ==
The dukes of Schleswig-Holstein-Sonderburg form a line of the House of Oldenburg; it consists of the male-line descendants of Duke John the Younger. The current royal houses of Denmark and Norway belong to the Schleswig-Holstein-Sonderburg line.

== Dukes of Schleswig-Holstein-Sonderburg ==
- John the Younger (1564–1622)
- Alexander (1622–1627)
- John Christian (1627–1653)
- Christian Adolphus (1653–1668)

== See also ==
- Schleswig-Holstein-Sonderburg-Glücksburg
- Schleswig-Holstein-Sonderburg-Beck
- Schleswig-Holstein-Sonderburg-Augustenburg
- Schleswig-Holstein-Sonderburg-Plön
- Schleswig-Holstein-Sonderburg-Norburg
- Schleswig-Holstein-Sonderburg-Plön-Rethwisch

== Sources ==
- Family tree of the House of Glücksburg
- O. Hauser, W. Hunke, W. Müller: Das Haus Glücksburg und Europa. Verlag Mühlau, 1988. ISBN 3-87559-058-9
