= Schleswig-Holstein-Sonderburg-Norburg =

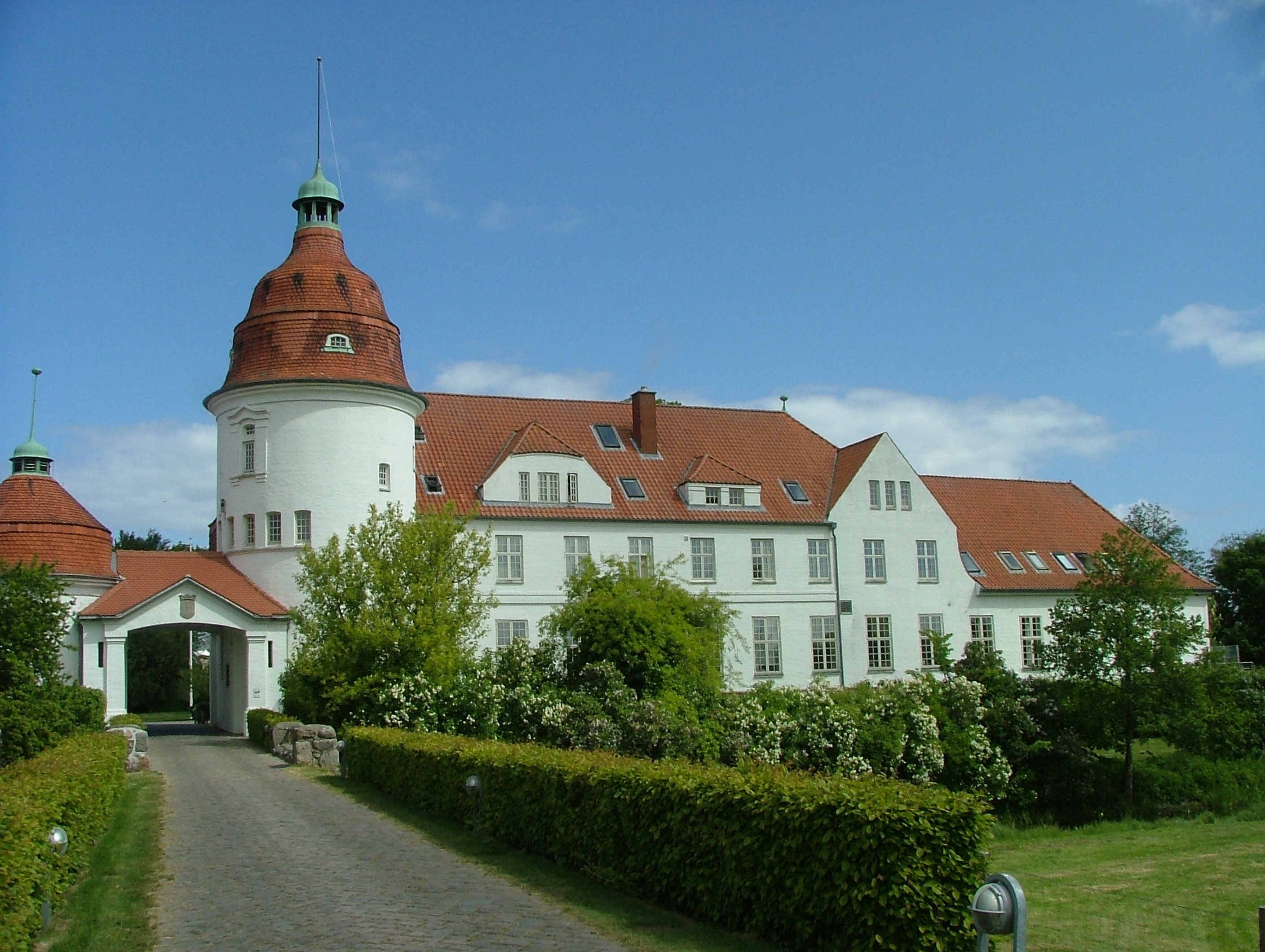
Nordborg Castle on Als gave its name to the line of Schleswig-Holstein-Sonderburg-Norburg

The sub-duchy of Schleswig-Holstein-Sonderburg-Norburg emerged as a collateral line of the House Schleswig-Holstein-Sonderburg. The region of Nordborg (also: Norburg or Nordburg) is on the island of Als.

== Historic overview ==
Around 1580 the younger brother of the Danish king, John acquired the island. When he died in 1622, the land was divided amongst his sons; like their father they were so-called Abgeteilte Herren whose status was not related to their dominion. Thus the northern part of Alsen initially went to John Adolf, whereupon he became the first Duke of Schleswig-Holstein-Sonderburg-Norburg. After his early death the region passed to his brother, Frederick. In the Second Northern War the land was devastated and the castle razed. In 1669 the state went bankrupt and the Danish king took it over.

In 1679 the Norburg estate went to the line of Schleswig-Holstein-Sonderburg-Plön and was given as an inheritance to Augustus of Schleswig-Holstein-Plön-Norburg, the second son of the Duke of Plön, Joachim Ernest. Because the Plön line had no heirs at the beginning of the 18th century, the first son of Duke Augustus, Joachim Frederick, was named as the new Duke of both dominions - Plön and Norburg. After the death of Duke Joachim Frederick, Frederick Charles, the son of his deceased brother, Christian Charles, - who came from a morganatic marriage - was named in 1722 as the new Duke of Plön and Norburg. He was not able to assume the Duchy of Plön until 1729 because of an inheritance dispute with the line of Schleswig-Holstein-Sonderburg-Plön-Rethwisch. Formally the last Duke of Norburg, he then abandoned the estate in favour of the Danish king, who took over all his debts in return. With that the Norburg line finally came to an end.

== List of dukes of Schleswig-Holstein-Sonderburg-Norburg ==
| Reign | Image | Name | Remarks |
|---|---|---|---|
| 1622-1624 | | John Adolf (1576-1624) | First duke, died without heirs |
| 1624-1658 | | Frederick (1581-1658) | Brother of John Adolf |
| 1658-1669 | | John Bogislaw (1629-1679) | Deposed in 1669 when the state became bankrupt, died without heirs |
State bankruptcy and transfer to Schleswig-Holstein-Sonderburg-Plön
| 1679-1699 | | Augustus (1635-1699) | Son of the Duke of Plön, Joachim Ernest, father of Joachim Frederick |
| 1699-1722 | | Joachim Frederick (1668-1722) | Inherited Plön as well in 1706, whereupon the lines were merged again. Died without male issue |
| 1722-1729 | | Frederick Charles (1706-1761) | Did not become the Duke of Plön until after the succession dispute with the line of Rethwisch, but gave Norburg up to the Danish king in return for his debts being taken over |

== Sources ==
- zu einer volständigen Geschichte der Chur- und Fürstlichen Häuser (GoogleBooks)
