= Philip, Duke of Schleswig-Holstein-Sonderburg-Glücksburg =

German aristocrat (1584–1663)

Philip
- Duke of Schleswig-Holstein-Sonderburg-Glücksburg
- Born: 15 March 1584
- Died: 27 September 1663 (aged 79)
- Noble family: Schleswig-Holstein-Glücksburg
- Spouse: Princess Sophie Hedwig of Saxe-Lauenburg
- Issue: Duke John; Duke Francis; Duke Christian; Mary Elizabeth, Margravine of Brandenburg-Bayreuth; Duke Charles Albert; Sophie Hedwig, Duchess of Saxe-Zeitz; Duke Adolph; Augusta, Duchess of Schleswig-Holstein-Sonderburg at Augustenburg; Christine, Duchess of Saxe-Merseburg; Sophia Dorothy, Duchess of Brunswick-Lüneburg then Electress of Brandenburg; Duchess Magdalene; Duchess Hedwig; Duchess Anne Sabine; Duchess Anne
- Father: John II, Duke of Schleswig-Holstein-Sonderburg
- Mother: Elisabeth of Brunswick-Grubenhagen

Philip of Schleswig-Holstein-Glücksburg (15 March 1584 – 27 September 1663) was the first Duke of Schleswig-Holstein-Glücksburg after the death of his father in 1622. He was the son of John II, Duke of Schleswig-Holstein-Sonderburg and Duchess Elisabeth of Brunswick-Grubenhagen.

== Early life ==
Philip was born on 15 March 1584 at Sønderborg Castle in the town of Sønderborg in the Duchy of Schleswig. He was the thirteenth child and seventh son of John the Younger, Duke of Schleswig-Holstein-Sonderburg (1545–1622) and his first wife, Elisabeth of Brunswick-Grubenhagen (1550–1586).

== Duke of Glücksburg ==
On the death of his brother Duke Christian of Schleswig-Holstein at Ærø in 1633, he inherited that island, as well as the town of Koping (Ærøskøbing), the district of Wuderup (Vodrup) and the domain of Gravenstein (Gråsten). That year, however, he ceded the last to his elder brother Frederick, Duke of Schleswig-Holstein-Sønderburg-Norburg, who had remained landless until he inherited Norburg in 1624 upon the death of their elder brother, Duke John Adolf. Frederick, however, returned Gravenstein to Philip in 1635 or 1636. The Æero appanage remained hereditary in Philip's branch of the dynasty until being purchased by their kinsman Frederick V of Denmark in 1749, who dissolved it as a fideicommis in 1767. Philip also purchased the domain of Freinwillen in Schleswig which he gave to his unmarried youngest (surviving) daughter Hedwig (1640-1671). In 1648, Philipp bought, from Hans von Ahlefeld, another domain called Gravenstein located, however, in the Sundeved north of the Flensburg Fjord. He did not retain that estate as part of his duchy, however, re-selling it in 1662 to Frederick von Ahlefeld.

Duke Philip died aged 79 on 27 September 1663 at Glücksburg Castle.

== Marriage and issue ==
On 23 May 1624, Philip married Sophie Hedwig of Saxe-Lauenburg (1601–1660), daughter of Francis II, Duke of Saxe-Lauenburg. They had the following children:

- Duke John of Schleswig-Holstein-Glücksburg (23 July 1625 – 4 December 1640)
- Duke Francis of Schleswig-Holstein-Glücksburg (20 August 1626 – 3 August 1651)
- Christian, Duke of Holstein-Glücksburg (19 June 1627 – 17 November 1698); married, firstly, Sybille Ursula, daughter of Augustus the Younger, Duke of Brunswick-Wolfenbüttel; married secondly Agnes Hedwig of Schleswig-Holstein-Sonderburg-Plön, daughter of Joachim Ernest, Duke of Schleswig-Holstein-Sonderburg-Plön; Christian and Agnes had a son, Philip Ernst, Duke of Schleswig-Holstein-Glücksburg (1673–1729), who married the only daughter of Christian, Duke of Saxe-Eisenberg, and had issue
- Duchess Mary Elizabeth of Schleswig-Holstein-Glücksburg (1628–1664); married Georg Albrecht, Margrave of Brandenburg-Bayreuth-Kulmbach
- Duke Charles Albert of Schleswig-Holstein-Glücksburg (11 September 1629 – 26 November 1631)
- Duchess Sophie Hedwig of Schleswig-Holstein-Glücksburg (7 October 1630 – 27 September 1652); married Maurice, Duke of Saxe-Zeitz
- Duke Adolf of Schleswig-Holstein-Glücksburg (21 October 1631 – 7 February 1658)
- Duchess Auguste of Schleswig-Holstein-Glücksburg (27 June 1633 – 26 May 1701); married Ernst Günther, Duke of Schleswig-Holstein-Sonderburg-Augustenburg
- Duchess Christine of Schleswig-Holstein-Glücksburg (22 September 1634 – 20 May 1701); married Christian I, Duke of Saxe-Merseburg
- Duchess Sophia Dorothea of Schleswig-Holstein-Glücksburg (28 September 1636 – 6 August 1689); married Christian Louis, Duke of Brunswick-Lüneburg
- Duchess Magdalene of Schleswig-Holstein-Glücksburg (27 February 1639 – 21 March 1640)
- Duchess Hedwig of Schleswig-Holstein-Glücksburg (21 March 1640 – 31 January 1671)
- Duchess Anne Sabine of Schleswig-Holstein-Glücksburg (10 October 1641 – 20 July 1642)
- Duchess Anne of Schleswig-Holstein-Glücksburg (14 January 1643 – 24 February 1644)

== See also ==
- Schleswig-Holstein-Sonderburg
