= Christian II of Anhalt-Bernburg =

German prince (1599-1656)

Christian II
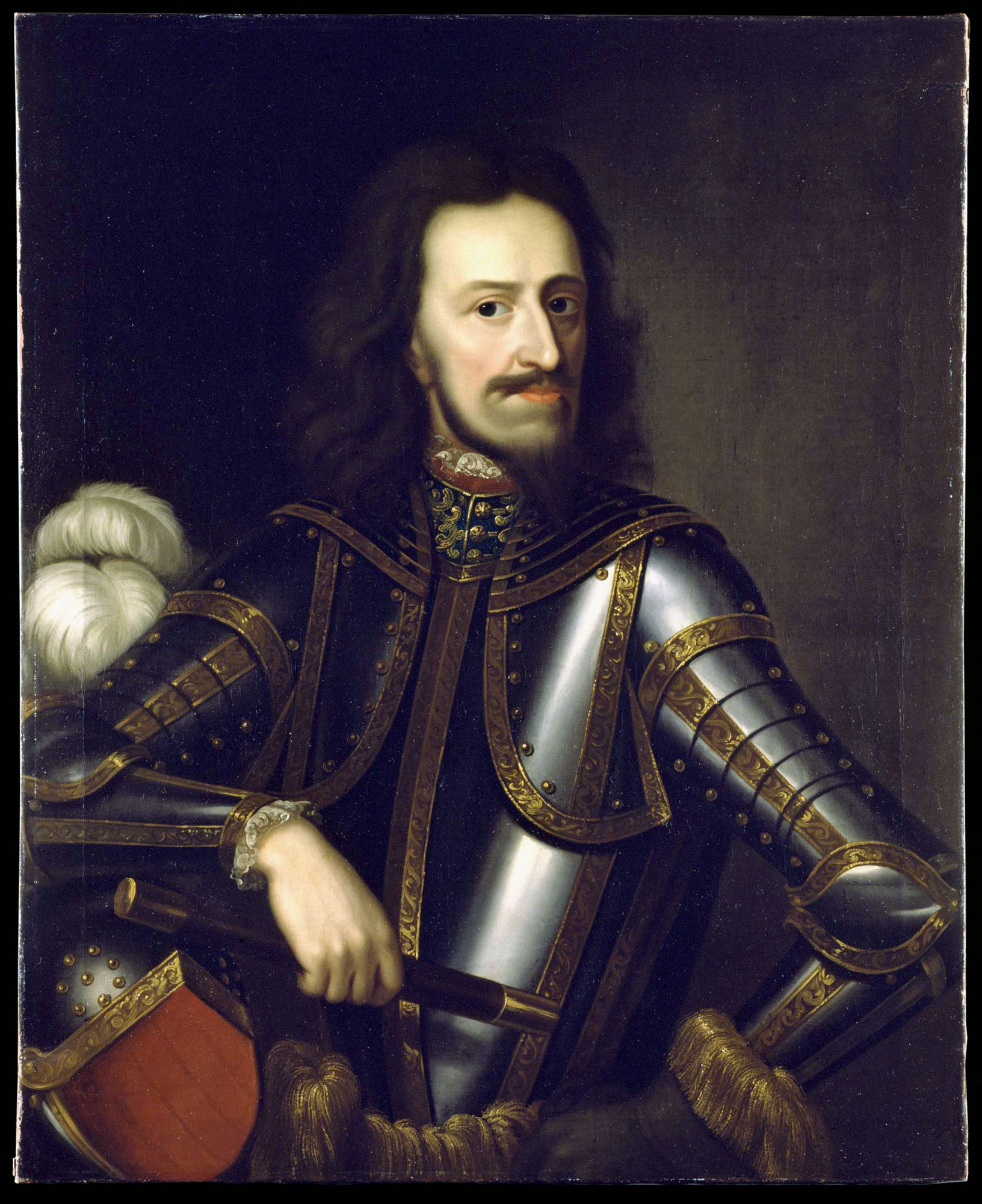
- Portrait of Christian II, c. 1628
- Born: 11 August 1599; Amberg
- Died: 22 September 1656 (aged 57); Bernburg
- Spouse: Eleonore Sophie of Schleswig-Holstein-Sonderburg
- Issue Detail: Victor Amadeus, Prince of Anhalt-Bernburg
- House: House of Ascania
- Father: Christian I, Prince of Anhalt-Bernburg
- Mother: Anna of Bentheim-Tecklenburg

Christian II of Anhalt-Bernburg (11 August 1599, in Amberg – 22 September 1656, in Bernburg), was a German prince of the House of Ascania and ruler of the principality of Anhalt-Bernburg.

He was the second (but eldest surviving) son of Christian I, Prince of Anhalt-Bernburg by his wife Anna of Bentheim-Tecklenburg, daughter of Arnold III, Count of Bentheim-Steinfurt-Tecklenburg-Limburg.

== Life ==
Christian received an excellent education in his early years and could speak French and Italian fluently. During the years 1608-1609 he studied in Geneva with his cousin John Casimir of Anhalt-Dessau accompanied by two tutors, Markus Friedrick Howell and Peter von Sebottendorf. Shortly after, he began his Grand Tour to France, Italy, and England.

In 1618, at the age of nineteen, Christian recorded the horror of the beginning of the Thirty Years' War; in his diary, he wrote that his duty to fight was "ma fatale destinée." For him, the war began at the Battle of White Mountain (1620), when his father was defeated and banished from the Empire. Christian was taken captive with the two regiments under his command. Nonetheless, he soon obtained the favor of Emperor Ferdinand II, who permitted him to return to Bernburg in 1621.

His uncle Louis of Anhalt-Köthen made him a member of the Fruitbearing Society.

After the death of his father in 1630 Christian succeeded him in Anhalt-Bernburg, which at that time was devastated by war. During the first year of his reign, Bernburg was plundered by troops under the Danish General Heinrich Holk and an epidemic fever killed almost 1,700 inhabitants. In 1636 Schloss Bernburg was almost taken by the marauding troops, but the great courage of the seventy-year-old Hofmarschall Burkhard von Erlach prevented this.

His 24 volumes of diaries are preserved; they provide a valuable source of information about the course of the Thirty Years' War.

== Marriage and issue ==
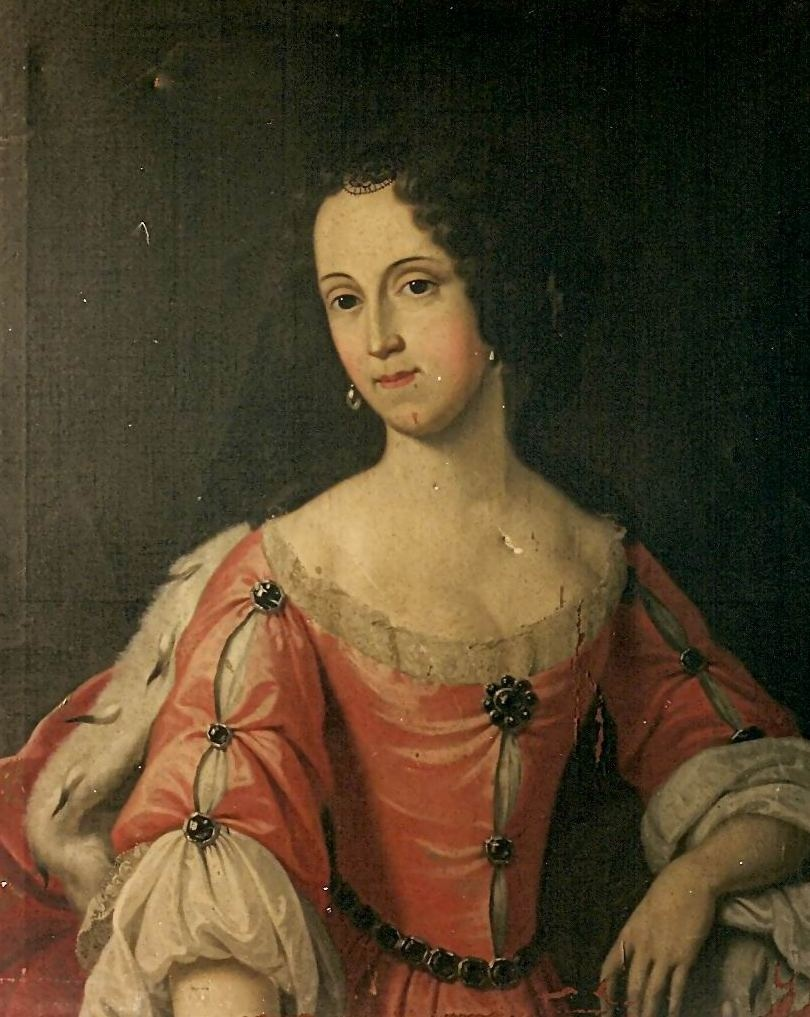
His wife Eleonora Sophia of Schleswig-Holstein (1603–1675)

In Ahrensbök on 28 February 1625 Christian married his cousin Eleonore Sophie (b. Sonderburg, 14 February 1603 – d. Ballenstedt, 5 January 1675), daughter of John II, Duke of Schleswig-Holstein-Sonderburg-Plön, by his second wife Agnes Hedwig of Anhalt (sister of his father Christian I) and also by birth a princess of Denmark as a granddaughter in the male line of King Christian III. They had fifteen children:

1. Beringer (b. Schüttorf, 21 April 1626 – d. Bernburg, 17 October 1627).
2. Sophie (b. Bernburg, 11 September 1627 – d. Bernburg, 12 September 1627).
3. Joachim Ernest (b. Ballenstedt, 13 June 1629 – d. Ballenstedt, 23 December 1629).
4. Christian, Hereditary Prince of Anhalt-Bernburg (b. Bernburg, 2 January 1631 – d. Bernburg, 20 June 1631).
5. Erdmann Gideon, Hereditary Prince of Anhalt-Bernburg (b. Harzgerode, 21 January 1632 – d. Bernburg, 4 April 1649).
6. Bogislaw (b. Harzgerode, 7 October 1633 – d. Harzgerode, 7 February 1634).
7. Victor Amadeus, Prince of Anhalt-Bernburg (b. Harzgerode, 6 October 1634 – d. Bernburg, 14 February 1718).
8. Eleonore Hedwig (b. Bernburg, 28 October 1635 – d. Gandersheim, 10 September 1685).
9. Ernestine Auguste (b. Plön, 23 December 1636 – d. Bernburg, 5 October 1659).
10. Angelika (b. Bernburg, 6 June 1639 – d. Quedlinburg, 13 October 1688).
11. Anna Sophia (b. Bernburg, 13 September 1640 – d. Sonnenwalde, 25 April 1704), married on 20 September 1664 to George Frederick, Count of Solms-Sonnenwalde; their daughter Sophie Albertine married Karl Frederick, Prince of Anhalt-Bernburg.
12. Karl Ursinus (b. Bernburg, 18 April 1642 – d. Parma, 4 January 1660).
13. Ferdinand Christian (b. Bernburg, 23 October 1643 – d. Ballenstedt, 14 March 1645).
14. Marie (b. Ballenstedt, 25 January 1645 – d. Bernburg, 5 January 1655).
15. Anna Elisabeth (b. Bernburg, 19 March 1647 – d. Bernstadt, 3 September 1680), married on 13 March 1672 to Christian Ulrich I, Duke of Württemberg-Oels.

Christian II of Anhalt-Bernburg House of Ascania Born: 11 August 1599 Died: 22 September 1656
Preceded by Christian I	Prince of Anhalt-Bernburg; 1630–1656	Succeeded by Victor Amadeus
