= Christian, Duke of Schleswig-Holstein-Sonderburg-Ærø =

Christian

Duke of Schleswig-Holstein-Sonderburg-Ærø
- Reign: 1622 – 1633
- Born: 26 November 1570
- Died: 14 June 1633 (aged 62)
- House: House of Oldenburg
- Father: John II, Duke of Schleswig-Holstein-Sonderburg
- Mother: Elisabeth of Brunswick-Grubenhagen

Christian of Schleswig-Holstein-Sonderburg-Ærø (26 November 1570 – 14 June 1633) was the first and only partitioned-off duke of Ærø. As a partitioned-off duke, he did not have sovereignty.

He was the eldest son of Duke John II (1545-1622) and at his father's death, he inherited the island of Ærø. His father had combined the small farms on the island into three manors: Gråsten, Søbygård, and Gudsgave. In 1624, Christian created Voderup manor on land he had purchased from the church.

Christian had intended to become Bishop of Strasbourg; however this did not happen. He was a Protestant, but was nevertheless canon of the cathedral chapter of Strasbourg from 1587 to 1604. The Catholic chapter continued to pay him the salary of an unmarried priest until c. 1619.

Christian and his housekeeper Katharina Griebel (1570 in Lütjenburg – 1640 at Ærø) had a daughter: Sophie Griebel (b. 1600). To provide for her, he gave her two large houses in 1629, one in Ærøskøbing and the other on the island of Dejrø. She was also exempt from paying any taxes. After Christian's death, Katharina married his administrator, Peder Christensen Pilegaard, who then settled in Ærøskøbing as a merchant.

After Christian's death, his inheritance was divided by his three surviving brothers:

- Frederick received Gråsten, which he sold to Philip in 1636
- Philip received Ærøskøbing and Wuderup
- Joachim Ernest received Søbygård, which was retained by the Dukes of Schleswig-Holstein-Sonderburg-Plön lines until they died out in 1761.

Also his nephew

- John Christian, son of Alexander, received Gudsgave.

The division of the island into many small territories resulted in a complicated tax administration and an active black market.
