= Schleswig-Holstein-Sonderburg-Glücksburg (elder line) =

Noble family

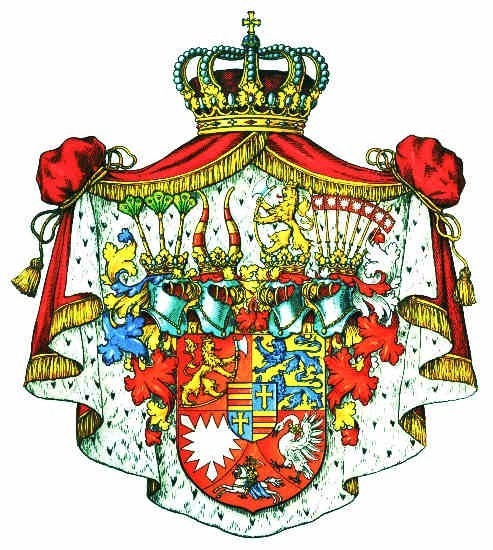
Coat of arms of the Dukes of Schleswig-Holstein-Sonderburg-Glücksburg

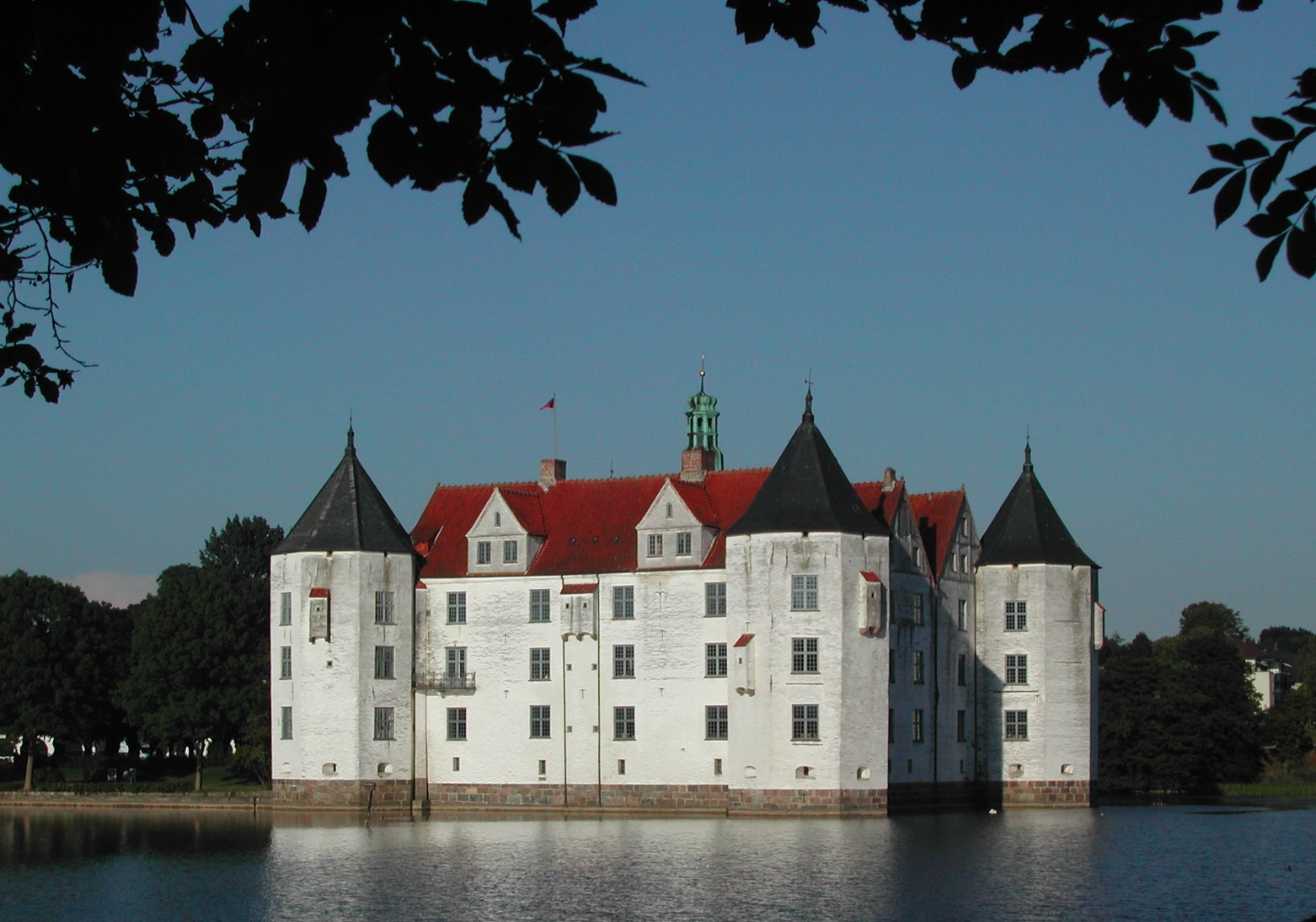
Glücksburg Castle in Schleswig-Holstein, the headquarters of the eponymous family branches

Schleswig-Holstein-Sonderburg-Glücksburg was a line of the house of Schleswig-Holstein-Sonderburg, a cadet branch of the House of Oldenburg, from 1622 to 1779.

== History ==
The line was founded by the partitioned-off duke Philip of Schleswig-Holstein-Sonderburg-Glücksburg (1584–1663). The line was named after Glücksburg Castle, where he had his headquarters.

Members of this line bore the title of Duke of Schleswig-Holstein-Sonderburg-Glücksburg. However, they had limited powers in ruling their territory, since it was not an estate of the Realm, but a fief of the Duchy of Holstein-Gottorp. Later, the family gave up these rights altogether and continued as titular dukes.

Some years after the death of the last duke, Frederick Henry William (1747–1779), the title went via King Frederick VI to Frederick William of Schleswig-Holstein-Sonderburg-Beck, who founded the younger line of Schleswig-Holstein-Sonderburg-Glücksburg in 1825.

== Dukes ==
Reign	Image	Name	Remark
1622–1663		Philip	founder of the line, married Sophie Hedwig (1601–1660), daughter of Francis II, Duke of Saxe-Lauenburg
1663–1698		Christian	son, married 1. Sibylle Ursula (1629-1671), daughter of Augustus the Younger, Duke of Brunswick-Lüneburg; 2. Agnes Hedwig (1640-1698), daughter of Joachim Ernest, Duke of Schleswig-Holstein-Sonderburg-Plön
1698–1729		Philip Ernest	son, married Christine (1679-1722), daughter of Christian, Duke of Saxe-Eisenberg
1729–1766		Frederick	son, married Auguste (1725-1777), daughter of Simon Henry Adolph, Count of Lippe-Detmold
1766–1779		Frederick Henry William	son, married Anna Caroline (1751-1824), daughter of William Henry, Prince of Nassau-Saarbrücken

== See also ==
- Schleswig-Holstein-Sonderburg
- House of Oldenburg
- Schleswig-Holstein-Sonderburg-Glücksburg (younger line)
