= Elisabeth of Schleswig-Holstein-Sonderburg =

German noblewoman

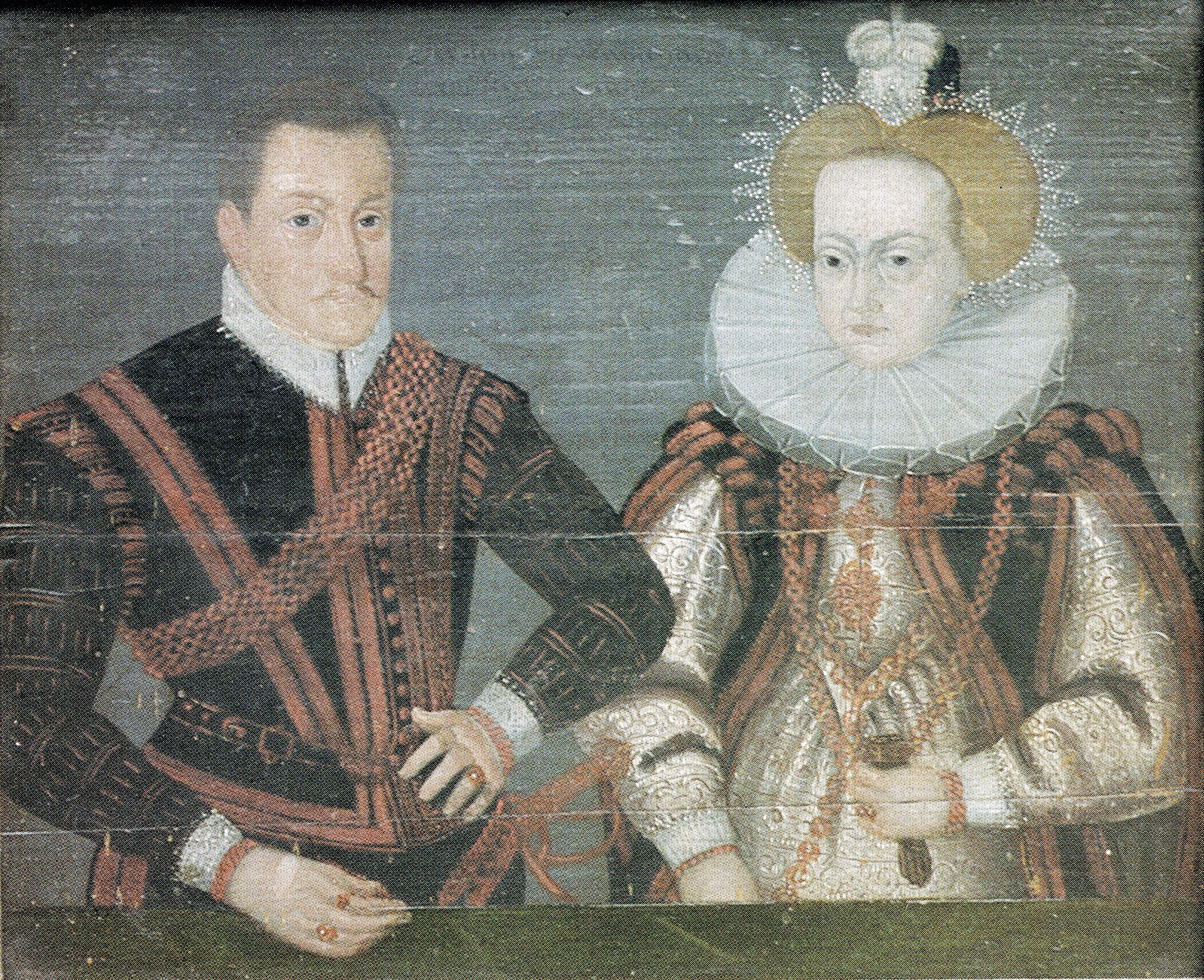
- Born: 24 September 1580
- Died: 21 December 1653 (aged 73); Rügenwalde
- Buried: Church of Rügenwalde Castle
- Noble family: House of Oldenburg
- Spouse: Bogislaw XIV, Duke of Pomerania
- Father: John II, Duke of Schleswig-Holstein-Sonderburg
- Mother: Elisabeth of Brunswick-Grubenhagen

Elisabeth of Schleswig-Holstein-Sonderburg (24 September 1580 – 21 December 1653 in Rügenwalde in Pomerania) was a German noblewoman. She was a Duchess of Schleswig-Holstein-Sonderburg by birth and by marriage Duchess of Pomerania-Stettin.

== Biography ==
She was a daughter of Duke John II of Schleswig-Holstein-Sonderburg (1545–1622) and his first wife Elisabeth of Brunswick-Grubenhagen (1550–1586). Her parents married on 10 August 1568 in Kolding.

Elisabeth herself married in 1615, to Duke Bogislaw of Pomerania. They resided in Rügenwalde and after 1625 in Stettin. Her sister Sophia married Duke Philip II of Pomerania-Wolgast. Her sister Anna was the second wife of Philip II's father, Duke Bogislaw XIII.

Her marriage remained childless. After the death of Bogislaw's brother Ulrich in 1622, Rügenwalde Castle was promised to her as her widow seat. She moved there after Bogislaw died in 1637.

Her Wittum included the city of Rügenwalde, with which she often quarreled during her widowhood. In Rügenwalde, she oversaw the completion of the famous "silver altar" and donated it to the Church of St. Mary in Rügenwalde, where it remained until World War II.

She died in Rügenwalde in 1653. She was initially buried in the church of Rügenwalde Castle, and later moved to the tomb of King Eric VII of Denmark in the church of St. Mary.

== See also ==
- Schleswig-Holstein-Sonderburg
- House of Griffins

== Bibliography ==
- Jensen, Jørgen Steen (1979). Książę Jan Młodszy ze Szlezwika-Holsztynu-Sonderborga jako teść książąt pomorskich: Bogusława XIII, Bogusława XIV oraz Filipa II. Materiały Zachodniopomorskie (in Polish). Szczecin: National Museum in Szczecin. pp. 249–261.
- Martin Wehrmann: Genealogie des pommerschen Herzoghauses, Saunier, Stettin 1937, p. 127.
