= Eleonore Sophie of Schleswig-Holstein-Sonderburg =

Danish and German princess

Eleonore Sophie
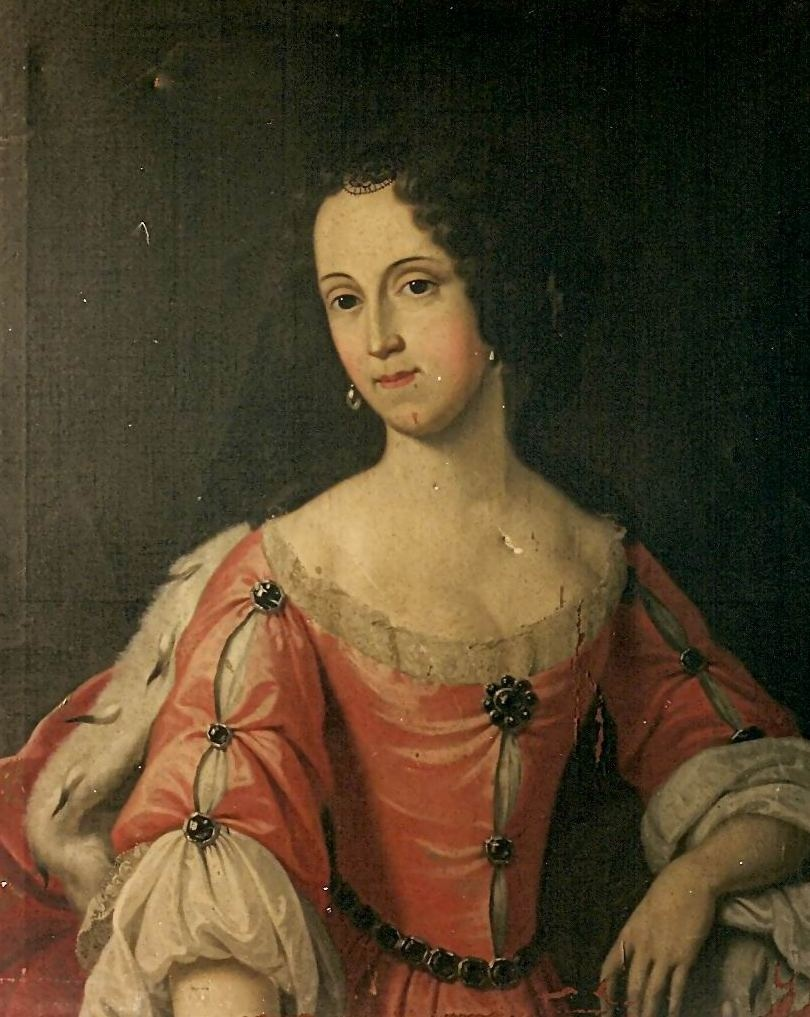

Princess consort of Anhalt-Bernburg
- Reign: 17 April 1630 – 22 September 1656
- Born: 14 February 1603; Sønderborg, Duchy of Schleswig
- Died: 5 January 1675 (aged 71); Ballenstedt, Anhalt, Holy Roman Empire
- Spouse: Christian II, Prince of Anhalt-Bernburg
- Issue: Victor Amadeus, Prince of Anhalt-Bernburg; Anna Elisabeth of Anhalt-Bernburg
- House: Oldenburg (by birth); Ascania (by marriage)
- Father: John II, Duke of Schleswig-Holstein-Sonderburg
- Mother: Agnes Hedwig of Anhalt

Eleonore Sophie, Princess of Anhalt-Bernburg (née Princess Eleonore Sophie of Schleswig-Holstein-Sonderburg; 14 February 1603 - 5 January 1675) was a member of the House of Oldenburg and the consort of Christian II, Prince of Anhalt-Bernburg.

== Biography ==
Eleonore was born in Sønderborg on 14 February 1603 to John II, Duke of Schleswig-Holstein-Sonderburg, the third son of Christian III of Denmark and Norway and Dorothea of Saxe-Lauenburg, and Agnes Hedwig of Anhalt, the daughter of Joachim Ernest, Prince of Anhalt.

On 28 February 1625, Eleonore married Prince Christian of Anhalt-Bernburg in Ahrensbök. They had fifteen children of which only six lived to mature adulthood:

1. Beringer (b. Schüttorf, 21 April 1626 – d. Bernburg, 17 October 1627), died in early childhood.
2. Sophie (b. Bernburg, 11 September 1627 – d. Bernburg, 12 September 1627), died in infancy.
3. Joachim Ernest (b. Ballenstedt, 13 June 1629 – d. Ballenstedt, 23 December 1629), died in infancy.
4. Christian, Hereditary Prince of Anhalt-Bernburg (b. Bernburg, 2 January 1631 – d. Bernburg, 20 June 1631), died in infancy.
5. Erdmann Gideon, Hereditary Prince of Anhalt-Bernburg (b. Harzgerode, 21 January 1632 – d. Bernburg, 4 April 1649), died in adolescence.
6. Bogislaw (b. Harzgerode, 7 October 1633 – d. Harzgerode, 7 February 1634), died in infancy.
7. Victor Amadeus, Prince of Anhalt-Bernburg (b. Harzgerode, 6 October 1634 – d. Bernburg, 14 February 1718).
8. Eleonore Hedwig (b. Bernburg, 28 October 1635 – d. Gandersheim, 10 September 1685).
9. Ernestine Auguste (b. Plön, 23 December 1636 – d. Bernburg, 5 October 1659).
10. Angelika (b. Bernburg, 6 June 1639 – d. Quedlinburg, 13 October 1688).
11. Anna Sophia (b. Bernburg, 13 September 1640 – d. Sonnenwalde, 25 April 1704), married on 20 September 1664 to George Frederick, Count of Solms-Sonnenwalde; their daughter Sophie Albertine married Karl Frederick, Prince of Anhalt-Bernburg.
12. Karl Ursinus (b. Bernburg, 18 April 1642 – d. Parma, 4 January 1660), died in adolescence.
13. Ferdinand Christian (b. Bernburg, 23 October 1643 – d. Ballenstedt, 14 March 1645), died in early childhood.
14. Marie (b. Ballenstedt, 25 January 1645 – d. Bernburg, 5 January 1655), died in childhood.
15. Anna Elisabeth (b. Bernburg, 19 March 1647 – d. Bernstadt, 3 September 1680), married on 13 March 1672 to Christian Ulrich I, Duke of Württemberg-Oels.

In 1630, her husband succeeded his father, Christian I, Prince of Anhalt-Bernburg, as the Prince of Anhalt-Bernburg. After her husband's death in 1656, their son Victor Amadeus became Prince of Anhalt-Bernburg.

She died in Ballenstedt on 5 January 1675 and was buried in the crypt of the Castle Church of St. Aegidien.
