= Nordborg Castle =

Small castle in Sønderborg Municipality, Denmark

Coordinates: 55°03′32.6″N 9°44′54.6″E

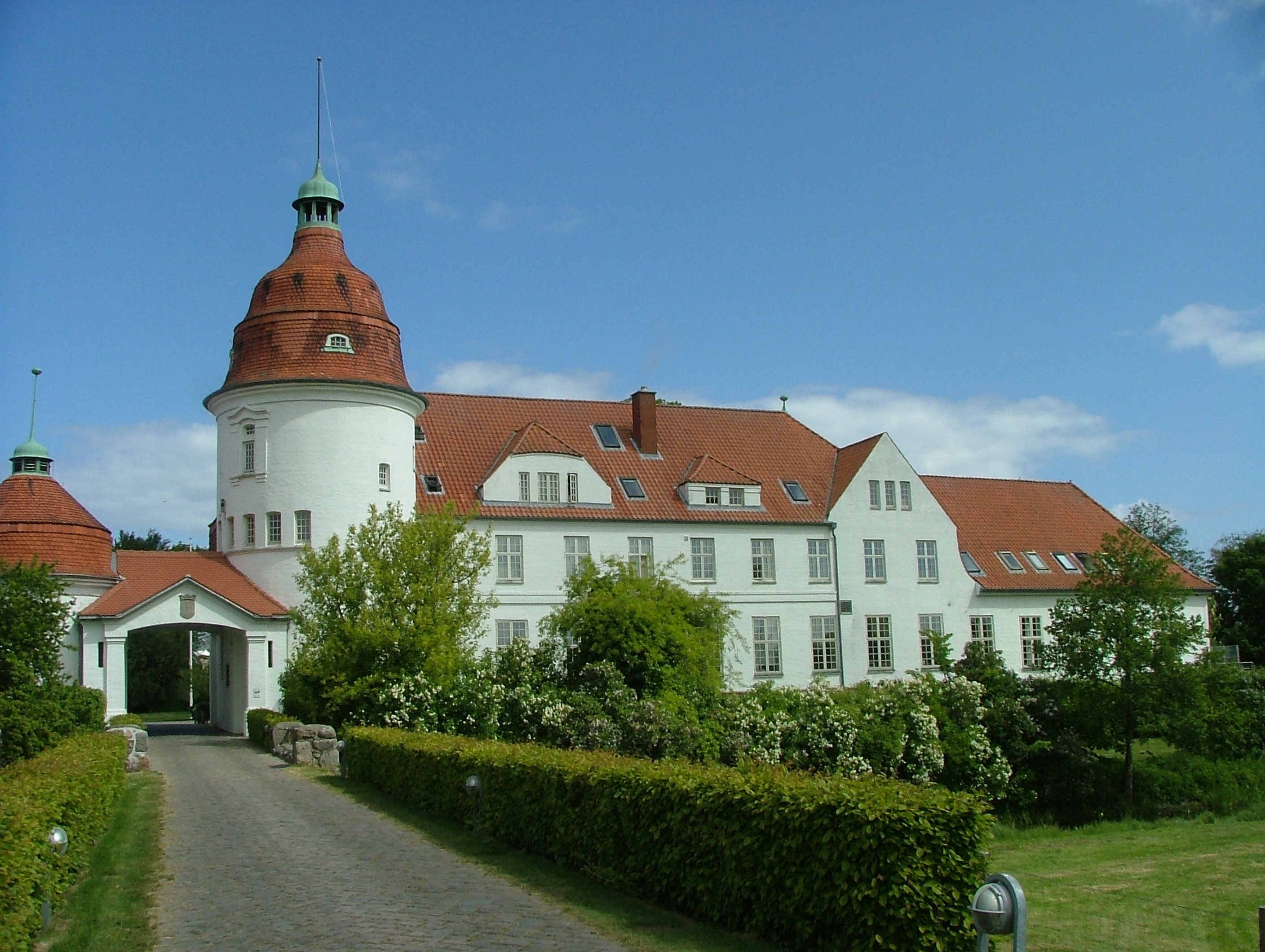
Nordborg Slot

Nordborg Castle (Danish: Nordborg Slot) is a small castle which lies on the southern side of Nordborg Lake (Nordborg Sø) in Nordborg on the island of Als in Sønderborg Municipality, Denmark. The castle premises are currently used by Nordborg Slots Efterskole as a boarding school. Nordborg Castle has also been the backdrop for a number of years for Nord-Als Musikfestival.

== Founding and early history ==
According to Saxo, Nordborg Castle was founded by King Svend Grathe (c. 1125–1157) under the name Alsborg. Hence, it can be dated to around 1150. Alsborg was built while the Wends still dominated the Danish coast; its location a few kilometers inland meant that the castle could not be attacked without warning, and the local population had a better chance of taking refuge there.

The first written evidence of Alsborg is from the end of the 12th century. From this, it is known that Bishop Valdemar of Slesvig (1158-1236) was held prisoner at Alsborg between 1192 and 1197.

After Sønderborg Castle was built at the south end of the island of Als (ca. 1158), Alsborg was renamed Nordborg, literally "northern fortress" (compare English "Norbury"). Nordborg was for a large part of the Middle Ages the property of the king, and was on several occasions a source of income for the king's widow.

In 1571, King Frederick II’s brother Hans the Younger (1545–1622) inherited his mother Queen Dorothea's possessions of Als and Sundeved including Nordborg. Hans was an enterprising man, who in the next 50 years constantly expanded and improved his properties. There was a series of building projects in and around Nordborg Slot.

Upon Hans' death in 1622, his possessions were divided into separate dukedoms, including Nordborg, which went to his son Hans Adolf (1576-1624). Hans Adolf died only two years later and so the dukedom then went to Hans the Younger's other son Frederik (1581-1658).

== Occupation and fire ==
Nordborg was occupied several times during the Swedish wars, first by the Swedes, then by the Brandenburgian and Polish troops and finally by Swedish troops until peace came in 1660.

In 1665 fire broke out in the castle, and it burnt down. Duke Hans Bugislav (1629-1679) went bankrupt and forfeited his estate, which reverted next to August, Duke of Schleswig-Holstein-Sonderburg-Plön (1635-1699). In 1678 rebuilding of the castle began, and at this time the ducal coat-of-arms was placed over the castle entrance. In 1730, Nordborg was taken back into crown possession. Nordborg had an estate of around 400 hectares, but in the following decades the land was turned into farms and in 1766 the castle was sold to a private owner and some of the buildings were demolished and sold for building materials.

== High school and boarding school ==
In 1909 the castle was purchased by Nordborg town. It was the pro-German Mayor Klinkers' dream to build a high school, which would be a counterweight for the Danish high schools north of the border. The castle was thereafter restored by the architect Eugen Fink, and in 1910 the castle was leased out to the German high school association in Northern Schleswig.

After the reunification in 1920 the castle was bought by the merchant Johan Hansen (1845-1928). He established at foundation (Stiftelsen Nordborg Slot) which since 1922 has run the boarding school, Nordborg Slots Efterskole, at the castle.

== Owners of Nordborg Castle ==
- (ca. 1150-1490) Between the Crown and the Sønderjyske dukes
- (1490-1564) the Crown
- (1564-1622) Duke Hans den Yngre
- (1622-1624) Duke Hans Adolf
- (1624-1658) Duke Frederik
- (1658-1669) Duke Hans Bugislav
- (1669-ca. 1672) the Crown
- (ca. 1672-1676) Johan Adolf of Pløn
- (1676-1699) Duke August of Nordborg-Pløn
- (1699-1722) Duke Joachim Frederik
- (1722-1729) Arvingerne til Duke Joachim Frederik
- (1729-1766) the Crown
- (1766-?) Hans Bugislav Carstens
- (?-1830) various owners
- (1830-?) Momme Steffens
- (?-1909) unknown owner
- (1909-1921) Nordborg town
- (1921) Johan Hansen
- (1921-) Nordborg Slot Foundation
