= Plön Castle =

Historic structure in Schleswig-Holstein, Germany

Coordinates: 54°09′24″N 10°24′50″E

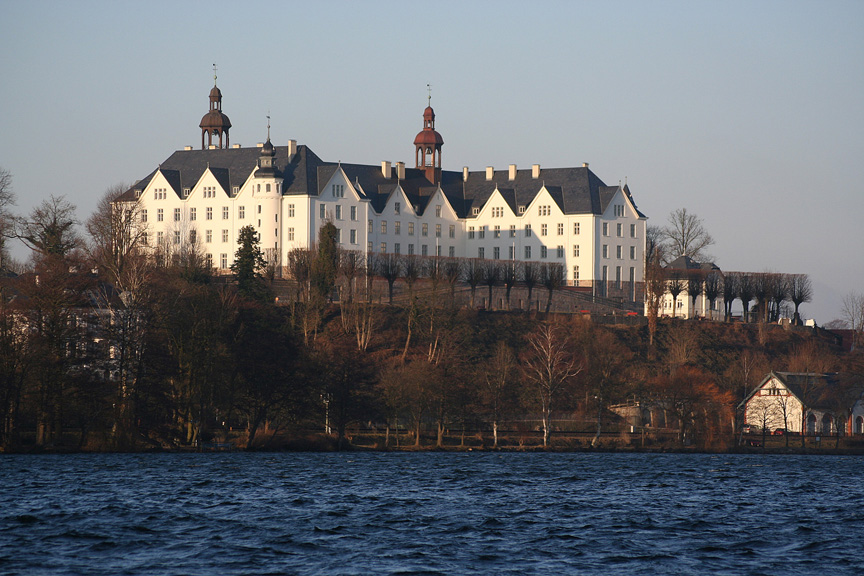
Plön Castle after its renovation in 2006; from the southwest with the Großer Plöner See in the foreground. The Kiel–Lübeck railway runs along its banks.

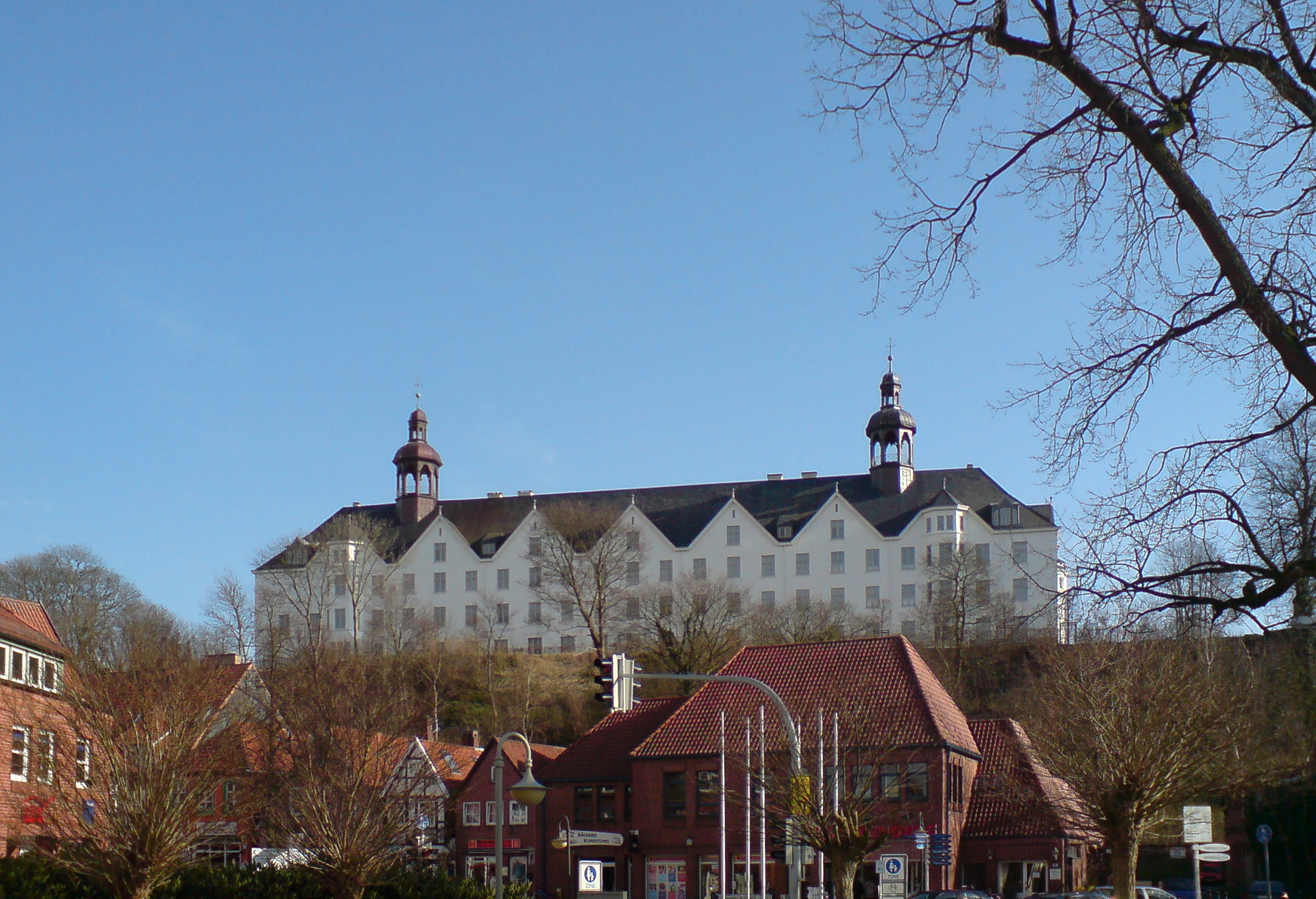
The north side of the castle which faces the town

Plön Castle (German: Plöner Schloss) in Plön is one of the largest castles in the north German state of Schleswig-Holstein and the only one located on a hill. The former Residenz of the Dukes of Schleswig-Holstein-Plön was built in the 17th century during the Thirty Years War and has had a colourful history in which it has, for example, been a school for military cadets and also a boarding school.

The castle ended the twentieth century as a possession of the state of Schleswig-Holstein, but they could not fund its renovation and so it had to be sold again. Since January 2002 it has belonged to the Fielmann Akademie Schloss Plön and, after extensive conversion, serves as a training and qualification centre for a branch of optometry. After being inaccessible to the general public for many years when it was a boarding school, its new owners have opened it to a limited extent to visitors.

== History ==
=== Prehistory of the castle site ===
The earliest Wendish defensive fortification called Plune dates to the 10th century and was located on the island of Olsborg in Lake Plön. It was destroyed in 1158. The rebuilding of the castle was carried out under Count Adolphus II of Holstein, and it served as a base during the colonization of the once-Slavic region. In 1173 the castle was moved to the Bischofsberg hill next to the small town of Plön - to the site of the present Plön Castle. In the 12th century Plön developed slowly into a market town and was given town rights in 1239. From 1290 to 1390 the hill castle was the seat of the Schauenburg line of Holstein-Plön and, after their extinction, was transferred to the Duke of Schleswig, Gerhard VI. Through the dukes of Schleswig, the small fortress was passed, four generations later, to the Danish royal family (Christian I was Duke of Schleswig and King of Denmark in personal union). During this period, however, Plön and its castle played no significant role in the country's history.

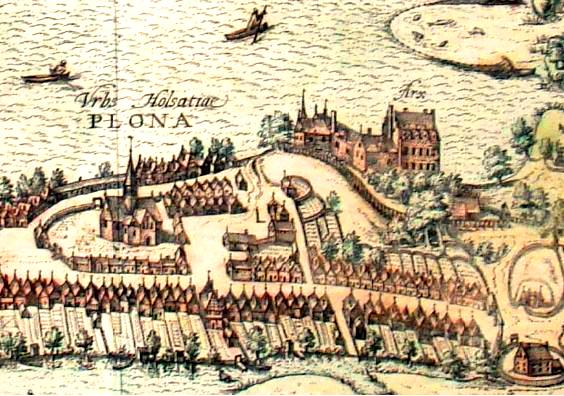
The old Plön Castle around 1595 on an engraving by Georg Braun and Frans Hogenberg, section from Civitates orbis terrarum

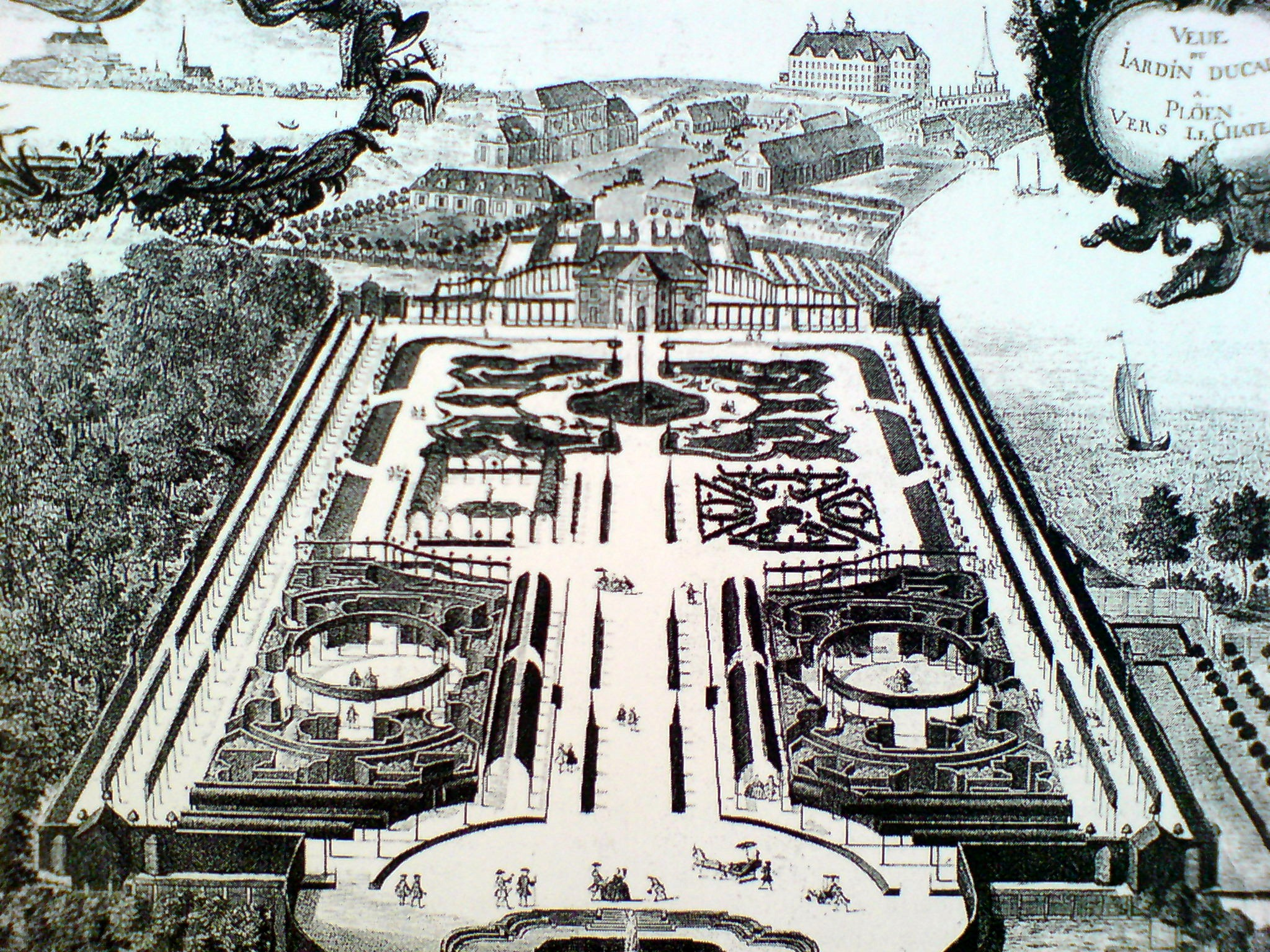
The garden, etching 1749, Schloss Plön in the background

In the course of the Count's Feud between Lübeck and Denmark, the castle was burned down in 1534 during a raid by Lübeck. Following that a new, larger, building was built on the still partly Romanesque castle grounds. In 1564 King Frederick II of Denmark transferred to his brother, John the Younger, one third of his share of Schleswig and Holstein, in violation of the Treaty of Ribe, whereupon John founded the "titular duchy" (abgeteiltes Herzogtum) of Schleswig-Holstein-Sonderburg. Amongst his estates was Plön, including the castle. Under Duke John, an early mercantilist, town and castle experienced an economic boom. After John's death in 1622 the Duchy of Schleswig-Holstein-Sonderburg was divided among his six male heirs and new sub-duchies were formed; one of which was the Duchy of Schleswig-Holstein-Plön.

=== Residence of the Dukes of Plön ===
The first duke of this line was Joachim Ernest of Schleswig-Holstein-Plön, the second youngest son of Duke John. On the occasion of his marriage to the Gottorf princess, Dorothea Augusta, the new ruler decided to build a palace fit for himself and his family. The project was financed inter alia by the respectable dowry of the bride. In 1632 the old castle was demolished at the behest of the Duke of Plön and in its place the current castle was built in the Renaissance style. The new residence was completed in just three years in the middle of the Thirty Years War.

The castle was the residence (Residenz) of the ducal family, but was never as important a place in state politics as Gottorf Castle. Because the dukes of Plön had other castles and summer residences, such as Traventhal House and the castles in Ahrensbök, Rethwisch and Reinfeld the Plön residence was not continuously occupied. Nevertheless, the building was one of the cultural centres of the duchy. Joachim Ernest established a library in the castle, which was expanded by his successors to 10,000 volumes. In addition, the Duke was very interested in physics and optics and collected various optical devices and instruments in his residence at Plön. After Duke Joachim Ernest, the castle went to his son, Hans Adolf, who, however, as a general in the service of the Emperor, rarely stayed in Plön and the duchy was largely represented by his wife and mother. Joachim Frederick, who followed Hans Adolf, also resided here. After he died in debt in 1722 without male heirs, the castle stood empty for seven years and some of the furniture was passed to his creditors.

The castle experienced its cultural heyday from 1729 onwards under the last duke, Frederick Charles. He introduced a baroque court and had the interior of the castle decorated in the rococo style. Frederick Charles extended the castle, erecting buildings around the castle courtyard that have survived to this day - the royal stables, the riding hall - as well as the garden palace, now known as the Princes' House. The castle was the residence of the Dukes of Plön until the death of Frederick Charles, who died without male heirs in 1761. Upon his death the enfeoffment expired and the duchy returned to the Danish royal house. The building was occupied as a widow's residence by his wife, Christiane Armgardis, until her death in 1779. It subsequently served as the seat of the bailiff (Amtmann), and also from 1777 to 1823 as a residence for Peter Frederick William, the mentally deranged son of Frederick Augustus I of Oldenburg. The young man, who was unable to discharge his duties as a duke, was given the castle by his guardian, assigned to the Danish king Christian VII and was allowed to retain a large household. After his death, the castle was used temporarily as a courtly residence. In 1833 a grammar school was established in the castle.

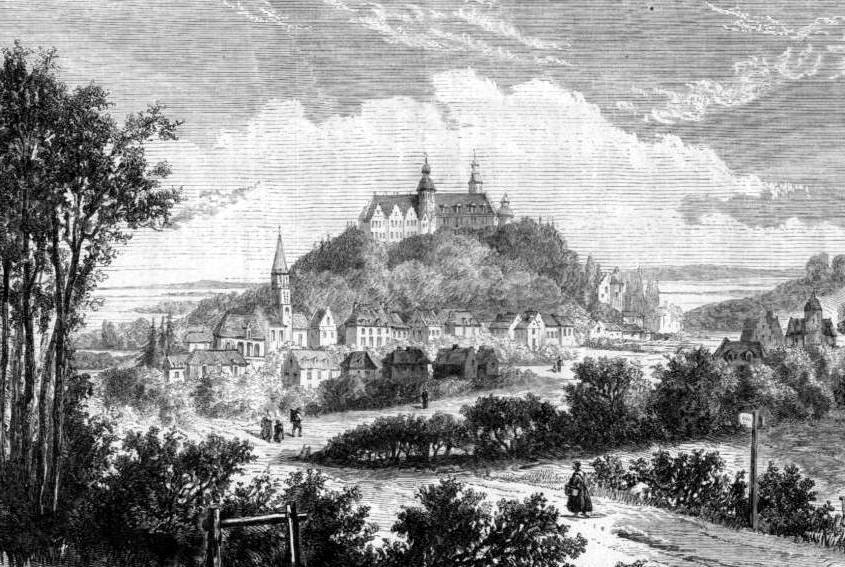
The town and castle of Plön on an 1864 engraving

=== Danish royal summer residence ===
In 1840 the castle became the official summer residence of the King of Denmark, Christian VIII. He had Plön Castle renovated and the furnishing partly replaced in a Classicist style. At that time it was decorated in white plaster, reminiscent of Danish castles such as Gråsten and Fredensborg.

=== Cadet training and educational establishment ===
After the Second Schleswig War of 1864, the castle fell into Prussian hands. In 1868, the interior furnishings were removed and most of them taken to Kiel Castle, where they were destroyed by fire in 1942 following an air raid. Plön Castle was rebuilt inside as barracks and subsequently served the Prussian Province of Schleswig-Holstein as a military school for cadets. The sons of the German Emperor, William II, were educated in Plön from the end of the 19th century and, for that purpose, the summer residence in the garden was extended to form the so-called Princes' House. An educational farm was set up on Princes' Island and Princes' Station was built in front of the castle on the newly laid railway line. At the suggestion of the Empress, Augusta Victoria, the chapel was given a new mural.

After World War I, military schools were banned by the Treaty of Versailles and the castle was used in the 1920s as a state educational institution (Staatliche Bildungsanstalt). In 1933 Plön Castle and the area around it was used as a National Political Institute, an elite school under the Nazi regime. Until the assassination of Ernst Röhm in 1934 it bore his name.

In 1945, Grand Admiral Karl Dönitz stayed for a few days in Plön, where he established a temporary command post. Before fleeing to Flensburg, the castle was the administrative headquarters for parts of the Flensburg Government for a single day on 2 May 1945. The castle survived both world wars without suffering any wartime damage. Afterwards British occupation troops entered Schleswig-Holstein and Hamburg as part of VIII Corps under General Evelyn Barker, and established their headquarters in the castle.

=== Boarding school ===
In 1946, with the permission of the British military government, the Plön Castle State Boarding School (Staatliche Internat Schloss Plön) for boys and girls was established in the castle. The boarding school utilised the entire castle grounds. The castle itself was used to accommodate the boys and the Princes' House the girls. The boat house and other outbuildings were purchased by the school. Lessons took place in the nearby Plön Castle Grammar School (Internatsgymnasium Schloss Plön now the Gymnasium Schloss Plön) in Prinzenstraße.

Its use as accommodation left its mark on the old castle, which became increasingly dilapidated. Advice in 1986/1988 showed that the site needed major investment and would only be saved from ruin by spending tens of millions of deutschmarks. By 1992 the castle was put on the market and in 1995 the outbuildings were sold. The sale was necessary because the state was unable to sustain the uneconomic running of the boarding school and the restoration of a historical monument.

In 2001 the boarding school was finally closed. The former pupils, teachers and staff still belong to an association, the Verein der Butenplöner.

=== Film-set ===
Whilst it was still a boarding school, the castle served as a film-set in several German shows:

- in 1969 for the thriller Seven Days Grace,
- from 1997 on for the television series Die Schule am See ("The School on the Lake"), which was repeatedly shown on ARD television,
- in 1994 in the movie Charlie & Louise an adaption of Erich Kästners junior novel Das doppelte Lottchen (Lottie and Lisa; republished as The Parent Trap).

=== Sale and reconstruction ===
After several unsustainable bids to the future of the castle, Günther Fielmann submitted an offer in 2002. Because this offer included an elaborate argument of the various benefits to the public, Schleswig-Holstein's state parliament approved it in 2002 Consequently, the Fielmann Akademie foundation purchased the castle for 3.6 million Euro. Günther Fielmann summarised the state of the monument at that time:

When we took over the castle in 2002 it was in a deplorable condition. The broad baroque era hallways had been converted to rooms for school children, using light-weight walls. Barely anything of the original floor plan was visible and the structure had been badly damaged everywhere you looked.

Over four years the castle has been reconstructed in accordance with preservation and heritage orders. The total costs amounted to more than 35 million Euros Schleswig-Holstein supported the project with 11.8 million Euros. The reconstruction was completed in 2006.

=== Academy ===
Today the castle is a public site of historical heritage hosting an optician academy. The first master classes already commenced in 2002 during the reconstruction period. Since the winter semester 2005/06 the academy offers a Bachelor's degree in optometry (BSc Augenoptik / Optometrie) in cooperation with the Fachhochschule Lübeck. It also provides various courses for both skilled workers and executives of the optical industry. 24 lecturers teach at the academy, and over 6,000 opticians are qualified every year.

Much of the castle is used by the academy. Some parts, however, serve as a museum: the Duke's historical Rococo rooms in the east wing of the castle have been intricately restored and can be viewed during daily tours. Recently the castle has also been the venue of various official and semi-official events. The great hall for example has been used for the Conference of German Culture Ministers, the SPD's functionary conference and a convention of the ZDF. It has been repeatedly discussed as potential venue of the G8 forum. In 2008 and 2009 the castle hosted the Global Economic Symposium with participants like George Akerlof, Richard Evans and Joseph Stiglitz. There have been numerous classical concerts in the castle's chapel.

== Literature ==
- Hans und Doris Maresch: Schleswig-Holsteins Schlösser, Herrenhäuser und Palais. Husum Verlag, Husum 2006, ISBN 3-89876-278-5.
- J. Habich, D. Lafrenz, H. Schulze, L. Wilde: Schlösser und Gutsanlagen in Schleswig-Holstein. L&H, Hamburg 1998, ISBN 3-928119-24-9.
- Ingo Bubert: Gutshöfe, Herrenhäuser und Schlösser im östlichen Holstein. Sventana, 1995, ISBN 3-927653-09-8.
- Dehio: Handbuch der Deutschen Kunstdenkmäler. Hamburg, Schleswig-Holstein. Deutscher Kunstverlag, München 1994, ISBN 3-422-03033-6.
- Peter Hirschfeld: Herrenhäuser und Schlösser in Schleswig-Holstein. Deutscher Kunstverlag, München, 1980, ISBN 3-422-00712-1.
- S. Hunzinger: Schloß Plön. Residenz – Adliges Armenhaus – Erziehungsanstalt. Struve, 1997, ISBN 3-923457-41-3.
