= Elisabeth of Brunswick-Grubenhagen =

Duchess of Schleswig-Holstein-Sonderburg from 1568 to 1586

- Duchess of Schleswig-Holstein-Sonderburg
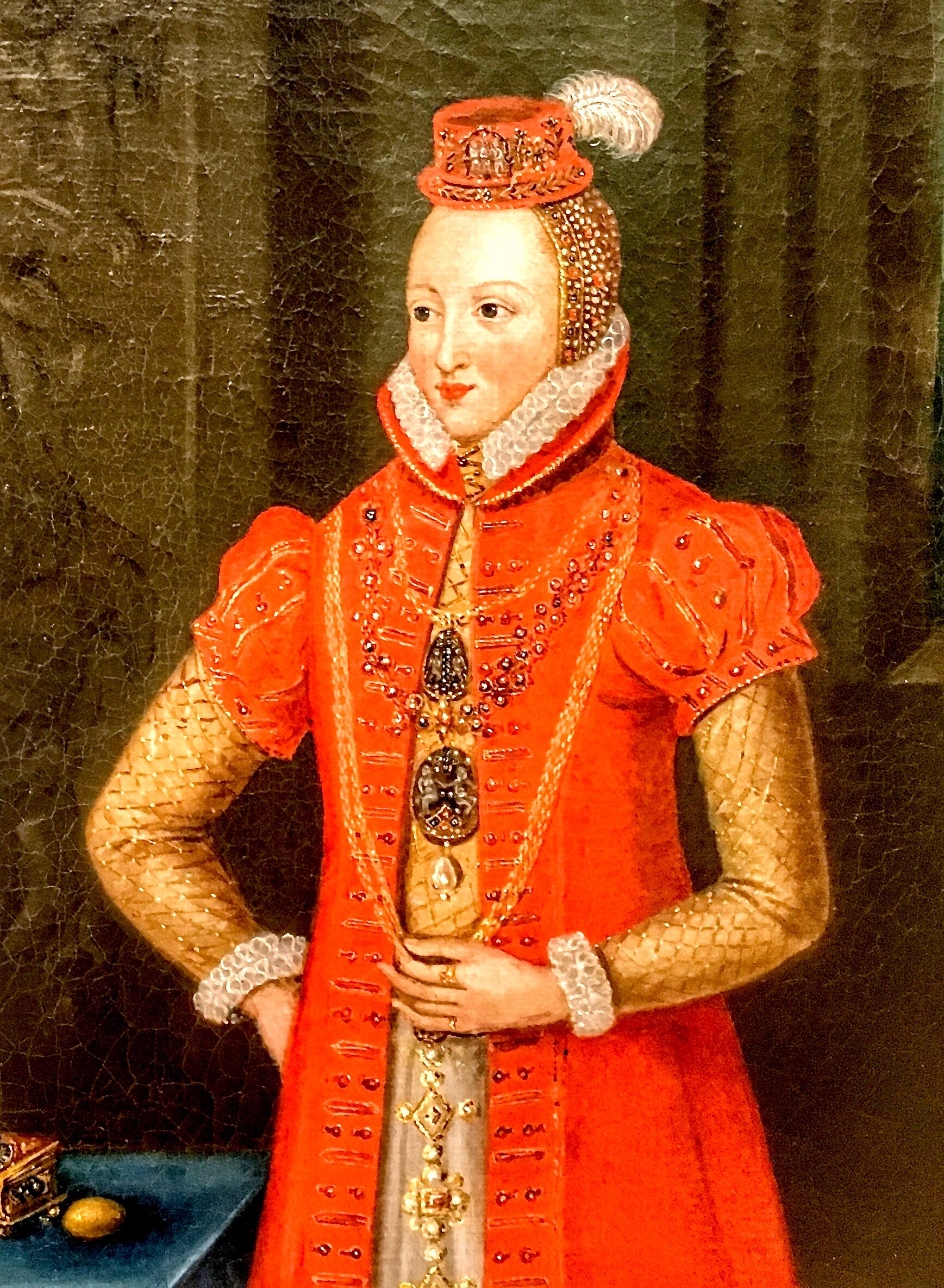
- Reign: 1568–1586
- Born: 14 April 1550
- Died: 11 February 1586 (aged 35)
- Burial: Schloss Sonderburg
- Spouse: John of Schleswig-Holstein-Sonderburg (m. 1568)
- Issue: Dorothea, Duchess of Legnica; Christian, Duke of Schleswig-Holstein-Sonderburg-Ærø; Alexander, Duke of Schleswig-Holstein-Sonderburg; Marie, Abbess of Itzehoe; John Adolph, Duke of Schleswig-Holstein-Sønderburg-Norburg; Anna, Duchess of Pomerania; Sophia, Duchess of Pomerania-Stettin; Elisabeth, Duchess of Pomerania; Frederick, Duke of Schleswig-Holstein-Sonderburg-Norburg; Margarete, Countess of Nassau-Siegen; Philip, Duke of Schleswig-Holstein-Sonderburg-Glücksburg
- Father: Ernest III of Brunswick-Grubenhagen
- Mother: Margaret of Pomerania

Elizabeth of Brunswick-Grubenhagen (14 April 1550 – 11 February 1586) was the first wife of Duke John of Schleswig-Holstein-Sonderburg, the son of King Christian III of Denmark.

== Family ==
Elisabeth was born on 11 April 1550 in Lower Saxony. She was the only daughter of Duke Ernest III of Brunswick-Grubenhagen and his wife, Duchess Margaret of Pomerania.

== Marriage ==
Elisabeth married the Duke John of Schleswig-Holstein-Sonderburg on 19 Aug 1568.

1. Dorothy of Schleswig-Holstein-Sonderburg (1569–1593), in 1589, she married the Duke Frederick IV of Liegnitz (died 1596)
2. Christian of Schleswig-Holstein-Sonderburg (1570–1633), Duke of Schleswig-Holstein-Arroë
3. Ernest of Schleswig-Holstein-Sonderburg (1572–1596)
4. Alexander of Schleswig-Holstein-Sonderburg, Duke of Schleswig-Holstein-Sonderburg
5. Augustus of Schleswig-Holstein-Sonderburg (1574–1596)
6. Mary of Schleswig-Holstein-Sonderburg (1575–1640), she became Abbess of Itzehoe
7. John-Adolphus of Schleswig-Holstein-Sonderburg-Norburg (1576–1624), Duke of Schleswig-Holstein-Norburg
8. Anne of Schleswig-Holstein-Sonderburg (1577–1616), in 1601, married Duke Bogusław XIII of Pomerania-Barth (died 1606)
9. Sophie of Schleswig-Holstein-Sonderburg (1579–1618), in 1607, married Duke Philip II of Pomerania-Barth (died 1618)
10. Elizabeth of Schleswig-Holstein-Sonderburg (1580–1653), in 1625, married Duke Bogusław XIV of Pomerania (died 1637)
11. Frederick of Schleswig-Holstein-Norburg (1581–1658), Duke of Schleswig-Holstein-Sonderburg-Norburg, in 1627, married Juliana of Saxe-Lauenbourg (daughter of Duke Francis II of Saxe-Lauenbourg), (one child). Veuf, married in 1632 Eleonor of Anhalt-Zerbst (died 1681), (daughter of Prince Rudolph of Anhalt-Zerbst) (five children)
12. Margaret of Schleswig-Holstein-Sonderburg (1583–1658), in 1603, married Count John VII of Nassau-Siegen (died 1623)
13. Philip of Schleswig-Holstein-Sonderburg-Glücksburg, Duke of Schleswig-Holstein-Sonderburg-Glücksbourg, he founded the second branch
14. Albert of Schleswig-Holstein-Sonderburg (1585–1613).
