= Anna Elisabeth of Anhalt-Bernburg =

- Born: 19 March 1647; Bernburg
- Died: 3 September 1680 (aged 33); Bernstadt
- Noble family: House of Ascania
- Spouse: Christian Ulrich I, Duke of Württemberg-Oels
- Father: Christian II, Prince of Anhalt-Bernburg
- Mother: Eleonore Sophie of Schleswig-Holstein-Sonderburg

Anna Elisabeth of Anhalt-Bernburg (19 March 1647 in Bernburg – 3 September 1680 in Bernstadt, now Bierutów), was a princess of Anhalt-Bernburg by birth and by marriage Duchess of Württemberg-Bernstadt.

== Life ==
Anna Elisabeth was a daughter of Prince Christian II of Anhalt-Bernburg (1599–1656) and his wife Eleonore Sophie of Schleswig-Holstein-Sonderburg (1603–1675), a daughter of the duke John II of Schleswig-Holstein-Sonderburg. She married Duke Christian Ulrich I, Duke of Württemberg-Oels on 13 March 1672, in Bernstadt. They had seven children in just eight years of which only two survived infancy.

The duchess was well educated, musically gifted, and a talented singer. She spoke several languages fluently and played numerous musical instruments. She had considerable influence on her husband and advised him in matters of state.

Anna Elisabeth died after complications from her last childbirth on 3 September 1680. She had been constantly pregnant during her nine years of marriage, giving birth almost once a year. Her death plunged Christian Ulrich into deep mourning. He wrote some poems in memory of his wife and lived as a widower for three years before remarrying despite the fact that he had no surviving male heirs at that time.

== Issue ==
1. Louise Elisabeth (born: 22 February 1673 in Bernstadt; died: 28 April 1736 in Forst), Princess of Württemberg-Oels, married Duke Philip of Saxe-Merseburg-Lauchstädt.
2. Christian Ulrich (born: 21 February 1674 in Bernstadt; died: 2 July 1674 in Bernstadt), Hereditary Prince of Württemberg-Oels.
3. Leopold Viktor (born: 22 May 1675 in Bernstadt; died: 30 April 1676 in Bernstadt), Hereditary Prince of Württemberg-Oels.
4. Fredericka Christine (born: 13 May 1676 in Bernstadt; died: 3 June 1676 in Bernstadt), Princess of Württemberg-Oels.
5. Sophie Angelika (born: 30 May 1677 in Bernstadt; died: 11 November 1700 in Pegau), Princess of Württemberg-Oels, married Duke Frederick Henry of Saxe-Zeitz-Pegau-Neustadt.
6. Eleonore Amöena (born: 21 October 1678 in Breslau; died: 2 April 1679 in Bernstadt), Princess of Württemberg-Oels.
7. Theodosia (born: 20 July 1680 in Bernstadt; died: 21 September 1680 in Bernstadt), Princess of Württemberg-Oels.
