= Agnes Hedwig of Anhalt =

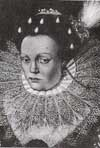

Electress consort of Saxony
- Tenure: 3 January 1586 – 11 February 1586

Duchess consort of Schleswig-Holstein-Sonderburg
- Tenure: 14 February 1588 – 3 November 1616
- Born: 12 March 1573; Dessau
- Died: 3 November 1616 (aged 43); Sønderborg
- Spouse: Augustus, Elector of Saxony (m. 1586; died 1586) John II, Duke of Schleswig-Holstein-Sonderburg (m. 1588)
- Issue: Joachim Ernest, Duke of Schleswig-Holstein-Sonderburg-Plön; Eleonore Sophie of Schleswig-Holstein-Sonderburg
- Agnes Hedwig of Anhalt
- House: House of Ascania
- Father: Joachim Ernest, Prince of Anhalt
- Mother: Eleonore of Württemberg

Agnes Hedwig of Anhalt (12 March 1573, Dessau – 3 November 1616, Sønderborg) was a Princess of Anhalt by birth, an Abbess of Gernrode, and by marriage Electress of Saxony and later Duchess of Schleswig-Holstein-Sonderburg.

== Early life ==
She was a daughter of Prince Joachim Ernest of Anhalt and his second wife, Duchess Eleonore of Württemberg (1552-1618). From 1581 to 1586, she was abbess of the Imperial Abbey of St. Cyriac in Gernrode.

== Biography ==
On 3 January 1586, she married Elector Augustus of Saxony, becoming his second wife at the age of 12. On their wedding night, she is said to have asked for the release of Caspar Peucer. Elector Augustus died a few weeks later, on 11 February 1586. She received Lichtenburg Castle as her wittum but never lived there.

Two years later, on 14 February 1588, she married Duke John II, Duke of Schleswig-Holstein-Sonderburg and became his second wife. She died in 1616, six years before her husband.

== Issue ==
From her second marriage, Agnes Hedwig had nine children of which only four lived to mature adulthood:

1. Eleonore (4 April 1590 – 13 April 1669)
2. Anna Sabine (7 March 1593 – 18 July 1659), married on 1 January 1618 to Duke Julius Frederick of Württemberg-Weiltingen
3. Johann Georg (9 February 1594 – 25 January 1613), died in adolescence
4. Duke Joachim Ernst I of Schleswig-Holstein-Sønderborg-Plön (29 August 1595 – 5 October 1671)
5. Dorothea Sibylle (13 July 1597 – 21 August 1597), died in infancy
6. Dorothea Marie (23 July 1599 – 27 March 1600), died in infancy
7. Bernhard (12 April 1601 – 26 April 1601), died in infancy
8. Agnes Magdalene (17 November 1602 – 17 May 1607), died in early childhood
9. Eleonore Sofie (24 February 1603 – 5 January 1675), married on 28 February 1625 to Prince Christian II of Anhalt-Bernburg

Royal titles
Preceded by Anne of Denmark	Electress consort of Saxony; 1586	Succeeded by Sophie of Brandenburg
