= Gnissau =

Small German village

Coordinates: 54°00′N 10°29′E

Gnissau is a small village in the district Ostholstein in Schleswig-Holstein, Germany, part of the municipality of Ahrensbök. It is situated halfway between Bad Segeberg and the Baltic Sea. About 850 people live in Gnissau. Gnissau has a sports club called TSV Gnissau, where people you play darts, beach volleyball and do Nordic walking.
