= Schleswig-Holstein-Sonderburg-Plön-Rethwisch =

The ducal line of Schleswig-Holstein-Sonderburg-Plön-Rethwisch descended from the line of Schleswig-Holstein-Sonderburg-Plön. It was founded by Joachim Ernest II (born 5 October 1637; died 5 October 1700) who as the third son of the Duke of Plön, Joachim Ernest, received the estate of Rethwisch in Stormarn as his inheritance. He was a general to the Spanish royal house in the Netherlands and became a Roman Catholic in 1673.

The line laid claim to the domain of Plön; this was rejected however by the King of Denmark. John Ernest Ferdinand (born 4 December 1684; died 21 May 1729) appealed to the Supreme Court and was vindicated. He died without leaving living descendants.

== List of dukes ==
Reign	Name	Remarks
1671-1700	Joachim Ernest II	Founder of the line
1700-1729	John Ernest Ferdinand	Son

== Sources ==
- Schleswig-holsteinische Blätter für 1835-[40]
