= Joachim Ernest, Duke of Schleswig-Holstein-Sonderburg-Plön =

Duke from the House of Oldenburg

Joachim Ernest of Schleswig-Holstein-Sonderburg-Plön
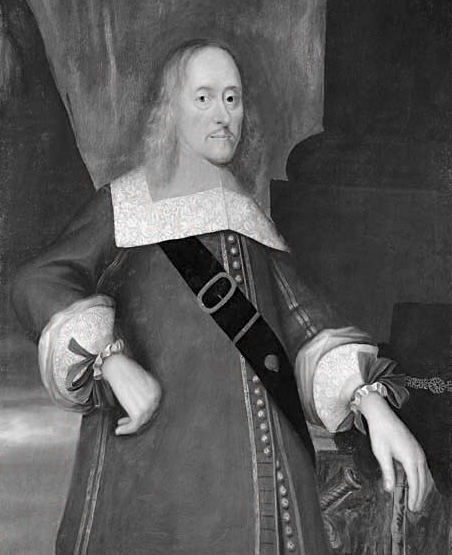
- Duke Joachim Ernest
- Born: 29 August 1595; Sønderborg
- Died: 5 October 1671 (aged 76); Plön
- Noble family: House of Oldenburg
- Spouse: Dorothea Augusta of Schleswig-Holstein-Gottorp
- Issue: John Adolphus, Duke of Schleswig-Holstein-Sonderburg-Plön; Augustus, Duke of Schleswig-Holstein-Sonderburg-Plön-Norburg; Duchess Ernestine; Joachim Ernest II, Duke of Schleswig-Holstein-Sonderburg-Plön-Rethwisch; Duke Bernhard of Schleswig-Holstein-Sonderburg-Plön; Agnes Hedwig, Duchess of Schleswig-Holstein-Sonderburg-Glücksburg; Duke Charles Henry; Sophia Eleonora, Countess of Hohenlohe-Neuenstein
- Father: John of Schleswig-Holstein-Sonderburg
- Mother: Agnes Hedwig of Anhalt

Joachim Ernest of Schleswig-Holstein-Sonderburg-Plön (29 August 1595 – 5 October 1671), also Joachim Ernest of Schleswig-Holstein-Plön, was the first Duke of Schleswig-Holstein-Sonderburg-Plön, which emerged from a division of the Duchy of Schleswig-Holstein-Sonderburg.

== Life ==
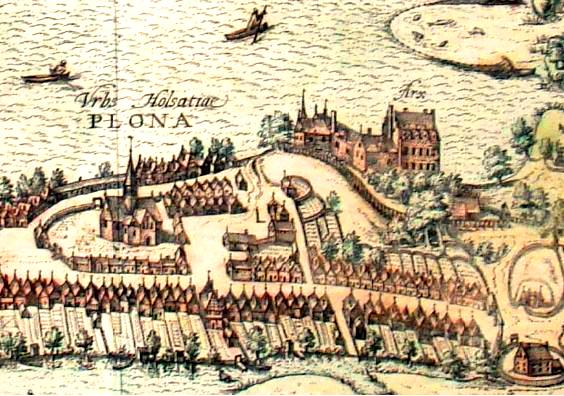
The old Plön Castle around 1595 on an engraving by Georg Braun and Frans Hogenberg, section from Civitates orbis terrarum

Joachim Ernest was born on 29 August 1595 in Sønderborg, the second youngest son of Duke John of Schleswig-Holstein-Sonderburg and Agnes Hedwig of Anhalt. As a teenager he went on an educational tour of Europe, as was typical for young noblemen at that time. This took him to Holland, England, France and Italy. In 1617 he participated in the Uskok War. When his father, the first of the so-called abgeteilte Herren (titular dukes who were not recognised by local landlords), died in 1622, the duchy was divided amongst the sons, resulting in five even smaller dukedoms. Joachim Ernest received Schleswig-Holstein-Plön. In addition to the new residence town of Plön his estate included Ahrensbök and Reinfeld.

On the occasion of his marriage to Princess Dorothea Augusta, a daughter of John Adolphus of Schleswig-Holstein-Gottorf, Joachim Ernest commissioned the demolition of the old castle in 1632 and had Plön Castle built between 1633 and 1636 as a residence and seat of government.

On 1 January 1671, shortly before his death, he was honoured in Copenhagen by the King of Denmark as a Knight of the Elephant (122nd bearer). He died on 5 October 1671 in Plön.

== Family ==
Joachim Ernest and Dorothea Augusta (born 12 May 1602; died 13 March 1682) had eight children:

- John Adolphus, also known as Hans Adolf (b 1634; d 1704), Duke of Schleswig-Holstein-Sonderburg-Plön, married Dorothea of Brunswick-Wolfenbüttel
- Augustus (b 1635; d 1699), Duke of Schleswig-Holstein-Norburg
- Ernestine (b 10 October 1636; d 18 March 1696)
- Joachim Ernest II (b 5 October 1637; d 5 October 1700), Duke of Schleswig-Holstein-Sonderburg-Plön-Rethwisch, married Isabella of Merode-Westerloo (b 1649; d 5 January 1701)
- Bernard (b 31 January 1639; d 13 January 1676), Danish general
- Agnes Hedwig (b 29 September 1640; d 20 November 1698), married Christian, Duke of Schleswig-Holstein-Sonderburg-Glücksburg, son of Philip, Duke of Schleswig-Holstein-Sonderburg-Glücksburg
- Charles Henry (b 20 March 1642; d 20 January 1655 in Vienna)
- Sophia Eleonora (b 30 July 1644; d 22 January 1688/9), married Wolfgang Julius, Count of Hohenlohe-Neuenstein

== See also ==
- Schleswig-Holstein-Sonderburg

== Bibliography ==
- Jørgensen, Adolf Ditlev (1894). "Joachim Ernst". Dansk biografisk Lexikon, tillige omfattende Norge for tidsrummet 1537-1814 (in Danish). 8 (1st ed.). Copenhagen: Gyldendals forlag: 491–492.

Joachim Ernest, Duke of Schleswig-Holstein-Sonderburg-Plön House of Oldenburg Born: 29 August 1595 Died: 5 October 1671
Regnal titles
New division	Duke of Schleswig-Holstein-Sonderburg-Plön; 1622–1671	Succeeded by John Adolphus
