= Schleswig-Holstein-Sonderburg-Plön =

Duchy held by the House of Oldenburg

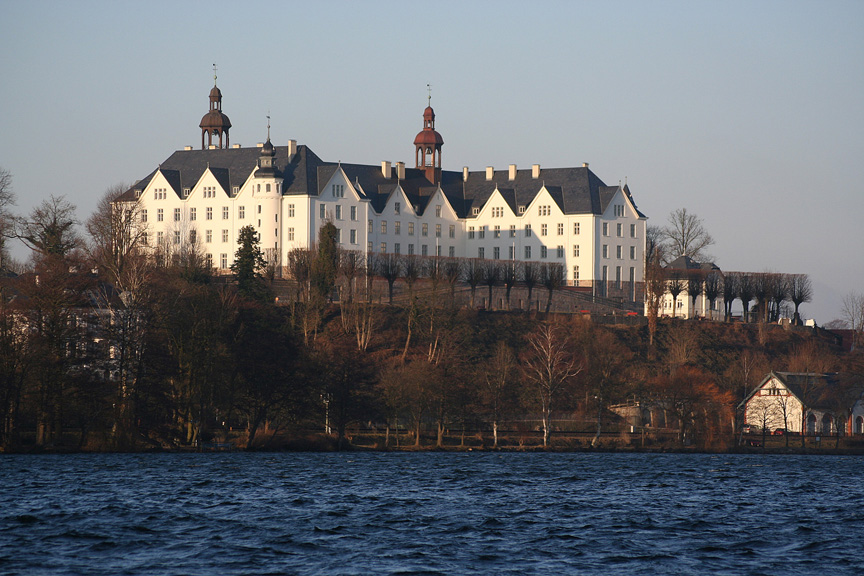
Plön Castle, former residence of the dukes

The Duchy of Schleswig-Holstein-Sonderburg-Plön (German: Herzogtum Schleswig-Holstein-Sonderburg-Plön), also Schleswig-Holstein-Plön, Holstein-Plön or just Duchy of Plön, was a small sub-duchy (Teilherzogtum) created by the physical division of the Duchy of Schleswig-Holstein-Sonderburg. Today, its remaining significance is primarily the building of Plön Castle. The Duchy of Plön was not a territorial dukedom in its own right, but a sub-division within the state structure of the duchies of Schleswig and Holstein. The scattered territorial dominion lay mostly in the southeast part of present-day German state of Schleswig-Holstein.

== Duchy of Plön ==
=== History ===
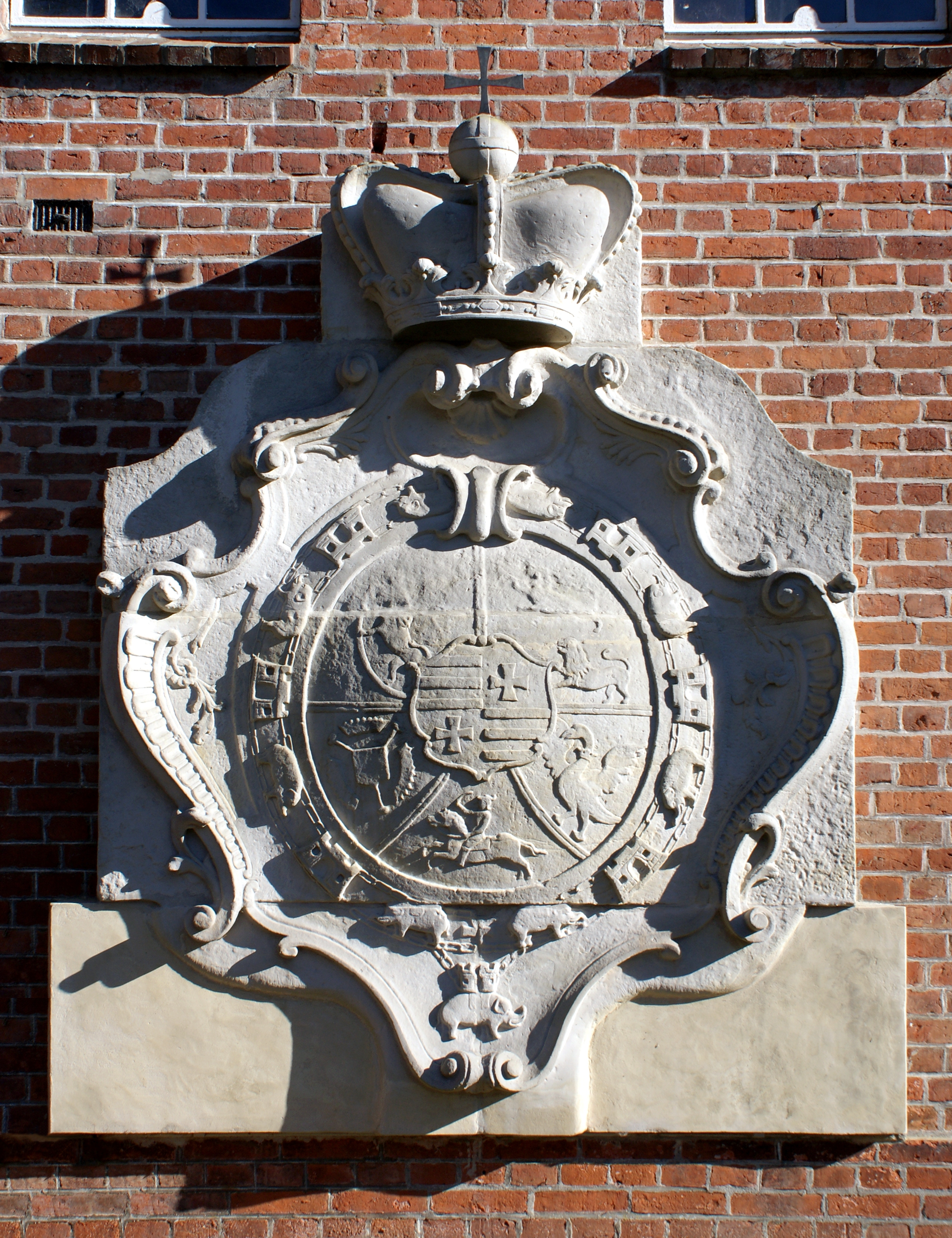
The coat of arms of Plön is encircled by the collar of the Order of the Elephant. The crown and orb represent royal Danish descent (relief from the gable panel on Traventhal Castle)

The duchy was created on the death of Duke John III from the House of Schleswig-Holstein-Sonderburg in 1622 as the result of a provision in his will. This provision was in disregard of the Treaty of Ripen that prohibited any arbitrary division of land in Schleswig-Holstein. The Dukes of Plön were so-called Abgeteilte Herren whose status was not based on territorial lordship. In addition to the creation of Schleswig-Holstein-Plön, the import of this will and testament was that four other small duchies were formed as part of the physical division of Schleswig-Holstein.

The first Duke of Plön had already received a share of the Duchy of Schleswig-Holstein-Ærø in 1633, which he immediately sold to his brothers, who thereby increased their originally equal shares in the island of Ærø. In 1669 the Duchy of Schleswig-Holstein-Plön was given the land of another ducal sub-division, that of Schleswig-Holstein-Sonderburg-Norburg, consisting of the northern part of the island of Als. This part of the duchy, remote from Plön, was spun off as the line of Plön-Norburg in the wake of further territorial divisions, but was reunited with Plön again in 1706. In 1671 there was a further division of assets after the death of Duke Joachim Ernest, and the Duchy of Rethwisch was created around the place of the same name under his second son, Duke Joachim Ernest; this reverted to the line of the first born in 1729.

In 1700 the Treaty of Traventhal was concluded at Traventhal House in Segeberg, a residence belonging to the Duchy of Plön. In 1704 both Duke John Adolphus and his son and heir, Adolphus Augustus, died. Although Duke John's grandson, Leopold Augustus, formally inherited the dukedom, in 1706 he too died, in infancy. As a result, the duchy passed to Joachim Frederick from the Norburg line. He died childless in 1722. The true heir was now John Ernest from the line of Holstein-Plön-Rethwisch, but his formal recognition was rejected by the Danish King Christian V, since John Ernest had been appointed as a grandee in the service of Spain and had converted to Catholicism. In 1723 the German emperor confirmed the claims of the line of Rethwisch, a descendant of the second son of Duke Augustus, Charles Christian who died in 1706, but he was not recognized as a duke. The proceedings dragged on for many years and on 24 May 1729, the Duke of Rethwisch died without an heir, whereupon Plön then went to the son of Charles Christian. Frederick Charles, who had been supported during the dispute by the Danish king, renounced the possession of Norburg in gratitude, which then passed to Frederick IV of Denmark and Norway.

Because the last Duke of Plön, Frederick Charles, had no legitimate heirs, in 1756 he introduced the so-called Plön Succession Treatise (Plönische Successionstraktat), by which he named the Danish king as heir to his estates. In return, King Frederick V promised to take over all his debts. After the death of the Duke of Plön, the Plön estate passed, in accordance with the contract, to the Danish royal house, bringing the creation of Greater Denmark (Dänischer Gesamtstaat) closer. The possessions were confiscated, and Plön's castles at Reinfeld, Ahrensbök and Rethwisch were demolished. This happened for both economic reasons – the royal house had enough residences on the mainland – as well as for political reasons, because it enabled Denmark to signal an abrupt end to the territorial fragmentation of Schleswig-Holstein, something which was finally sealed by the Treaty of Tsarskoe Selo and the emergence of the Greater Denmark state.

=== List of dukes of Schleswig-Holstein-Sonderburg-Plön ===
| Reign | Image | Name | Remarks |
|---|---|---|---|
| 1622–1671 | | Joachim Ernest | Founder of the duchy; his first son inherited Plön, his second son became Duke of Norburg, his third son, Duke of Rethwisch |
| 1671–1704 | | John Adolphus | Also known as Hans Adolf. Son of Joachim Ernest. His son, Adolphus Augustus, also died in 1704 |
| (1704–1706) | | Leopold Augustus | Grandson of John Adolphus (John Adolphus), born 1702, died as a child without having reigned |
| 1706–1722 | | Joachim Frederick | Nephew of John Adolphus, originated from the Norburg collateral line (Nebenlinie) |
| 1722–1761 | | Frederick Charles | Nephew of Joachim Frederick. The last Duke of Plön; as a result of a succession dispute with the Rethwisch line, he did not begin his reign until 1729 |

== Topography ==
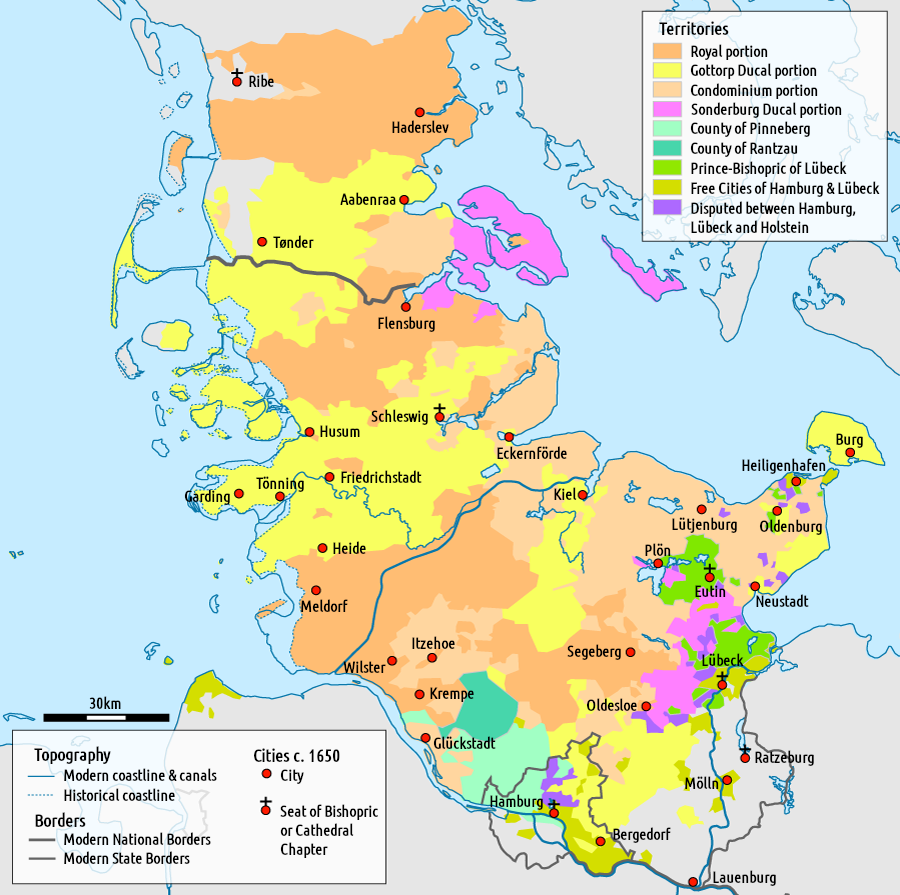
Schleswig and Holstein around 1650. The Duchy of Plön emerged from the Sonderburg division; its territory in southeastern Holstein comprised several individual estates between Plön and Oldesloe.

=== Divisions ===
The territorial centres of Schleswig-Holstein-Plön were the districts (Ämter) of Ahrensbök and Reinfeld established after the Reformation by the merging of the former abbeys at Ahrensbök and Reinfeld. Through the sale and acquisition of land, the size of the duchy, however, changed several times. In the mid-18th century, it largely consisted of the following administrative units, some of which are identical with the present-day towns and villages of the same name:

- Town and Amt of Plön
- Amt of Ahrensbök
- Amt of Reinfeld
- Amt of Traventhal
- Amt of Rethwisch

=== Residences ===
From 1623 to 1636 the ducal residence was located in Ahrensbök in Hoppenbrook Castle on the site of the former buildings of the Carthusian monastery. It was then transferred, on the completion of Plön Castle, to Plön, which thereby obtained its character as a small north German Residenz town. Other ducal residences were situated in Reinfeld, Rethwisch and Traventhal.

== Sources ==
- Neugebauer, Werner (1957). Schönes Holstein. Lübeck, Lübecker Nachrichten, p. 84/85, p. 275 ff.
