= John Adolph, Duke of Schleswig-Holstein-Sonderburg-Norburg =

John Adolph, Duke of Schleswig-Holstein-Norburg
- Born: 15 September 1576
- Died: 21 February 1624 (aged 47)
- House: House of Oldenburg
- Father: John II, Duke of Schleswig-Holstein-Sonderburg
- Mother: Elisabeth of Brunswick-Grubenhagen

John Adolph of Schleswig-Holstein-Sonderburg-Norburg (German: Johann Adolf or Hans Adolf; 15 September 1576 – 21 February 1624), was a Duke of Norburg at Als. He was the son of John II of Schleswig-Holstein-Sonderburg and his wife Elizabeth of Brunswick-Grubenhagen. When his father died in 1622, he inherited the area around the Norburg on the island of Als and thus became the first Duke of Schleswig-Holstein-Sonderburg-Norburg. He went to Rome to study from 1596 to 1597, as his father had done.

He was engaged to Maria Hedwig, a daughter of Duke Ernest Louis of Pomerania-Wolgast. However, she died in 1606, before a marriage could take place. He remained unmarried.

John Adolph died in 1624. His brother Frederick inherited his title and his land.
