= Partitioned-off duke =

Series of dukes whose territories were not recognized by the estates of the realm

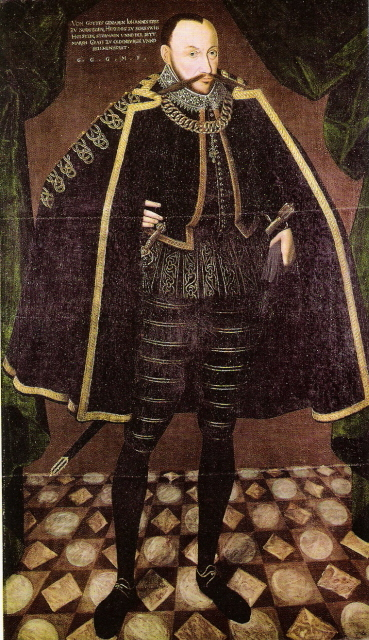
John II was the first of the partitioned-off dukes. After his death his territory was divided into several partitioned off microstates

In the duchies of Schleswig and Holstein, the term partitioned-off duke (German: Abgeteilte Herren) was used to denote a series of dukes whose territories were not recognized by the estates of the realm.

== Background ==
The background for this phenomenon was the Treaty of Ribe of 1460, in which King Christian I of Denmark, after his election as Duke of Schleswig and Count of Holstein, had laid down that Schleswig and Holstein should forever be ruled by a joint sovereign, in a personal union with Denmark. The promise was broken in 1544, when King Christian III of Denmark divided the territories between himself and his half-brothers John II the Elder and Adolf. However, when Christian's son, Frederick II of Denmark, tried to divide the territory with his brother, John II the Younger, the Estates refused to pay John II homage. John II was given the title and rank of a duke, as well as the income from his own lands, but de facto rule over Schleswig and Holstein remained with his brother and uncle. John thus founded the Schleswig-Holstein-Sonderburg branch of the House of Oldenburg.

His partitioned-off duchy was not allowed to mint coins, nor to maintain a standing army. After his death, it was further subdivided among his children, creating several collateral branches of the House of Schleswig-Holstein-Sonderburg.

== See also ==
- Apanage
- Secundogeniture

== References and sources ==
- Carsten Porskrog Rasmussen, Elke Imberger, Dieter Lohmeier, Ingwer Momsen, Frauke Witte, Marion Hartwig (eds.): Die Fürsten des Landes. Herzöge und Grafen von Schleswig, Holstein und Lauenburg, first edition, Wachholtz, 2008, ISBN 978-3-529-02606-5.
