= Frederick, Duke of Schleswig-Holstein-Sønderburg-Norburg =

Duke of Schleswig-Holstein-Sonderburg-Norburg (1581–1658)

Frederick
- Duke of Schleswig-Holstein-Sønderburg-Norburg
- Born: 26 November 1581; Sønderborg
- Died: 22 July 1658 (aged 76); Nordborg
- Noble family: House of Oldenburg
- Spouses: Juliana of Saxe-Lauenburg; Eleanor of Anhalt-Zerbst
- Father: John II, Duke of Schleswig-Holstein-Sonderburg
- Mother: Elisabeth of Brunswick-Grubenhagen

Frederick of Schleswig-Holstein-Sonderburg-Norburg (26 November 1581, in Sønderborg – 22 July 1658, in Nordborg) was Duke of Schleswig-Holstein-Sonderburg-Norburg.

== Life ==
Frederick was the youngest son of John, Duke of Schleswig-Holstein-Sonderburg and his first wife, Elisabeth of Brunswick-Grubenhagen. Since Frederick was the youngest son, no duchy was originally provided for him. However, after the death of his brother John Adolph in 1624, he inherited his brother's title and duchy.

== Marriage and issue ==
Frederick married on 1 August 1627 Juliana, daughter of Francis II, Duke of Saxe-Lauenburg. They had one son:

- John Bogislaw (30 September 1629 – 17 December 1679).

After the death of his first wife in 1630, Frederick married on 5 February 1632 Eleanor of Anhalt-Zerbst (10 November 1608, Zerbst – 2 November 1680, Osterholm), daughter of Rudolph, Prince of Anhalt-Zerbst. They had five children:

- Elisabeth Juliane (24 June 1633 – 4 February 1704, Wolfenbüttel); married on 17 August 1656 Anton Ulrich, Duke of Brunswick-Wolfenbüttel (1633–1714).
- Dorothea Hedwig (18 April 1636 – 23 September 1692, Gandersheim); Abbess of Gandersheim (1665–78), she converted to Catholicism and married on 7 June 1678 Christopher of Rantzau-Hohenfeld.
- Christian August (30 April 1639 – 1687); English Admiral
- Louise Amöne (15 January 1642 – 4 June 1685); married on 28 August 1665 John Frederick of Hohenlohe-Neuenstein-Öhringen (1617–1702).
- Rudolph Frederick (27 September 1645 – 14 November 1688); married on 10 June 1680 Bibiane of Promnitz (8 August 1649 – 19 August 1685); their daughter married Augustus William, Duke of Brunswick-Lüneburg.

After Frederick's death on 22 July 1658, his eldest son inherited the title; his widow, Eleanor von Anhalt-Zerbst, acted as guardian.
