= Rethwisch, Stormarn =

Rethwisch
- Municipality
- Coat of arms

- Location of Rethwisch within Stormarn district
- Interactive map of Rethwisch
- Location within Germany Location within Schleswig-Holstein
- Coordinates: 53°46′58″N 10°26′33″E
- Country: Germany
- State: Schleswig-Holstein
- District: Stormarn
- Municipal assoc.: Bad Oldesloe-Land
- Subdivisions: 7

Government
  - Mayor: Jens Poppinga (CDU)

Area
  - Total: 13.24 km^{2} (5.11 sq mi)
- Elevation: 29 m (95 ft)

Population (2025-12-31)
  - Total: 1,165
  - Density: 87.99/km^{2} (227.9/sq mi)
- Time zone: UTC+01:00 (CET)
  - Summer (DST): UTC+02:00 (CEST)
- Postal codes: 23847
- Dialling codes: 04539
- Vehicle registration: OD
- Website: www.amt-bad- oldesloe-land.de

Rethwisch is a municipality in the district of Stormarn, in Schleswig-Holstein, Germany.
