= Ahrensbök =

Municipality in Schleswig-Holstein, Germany

- Municipality
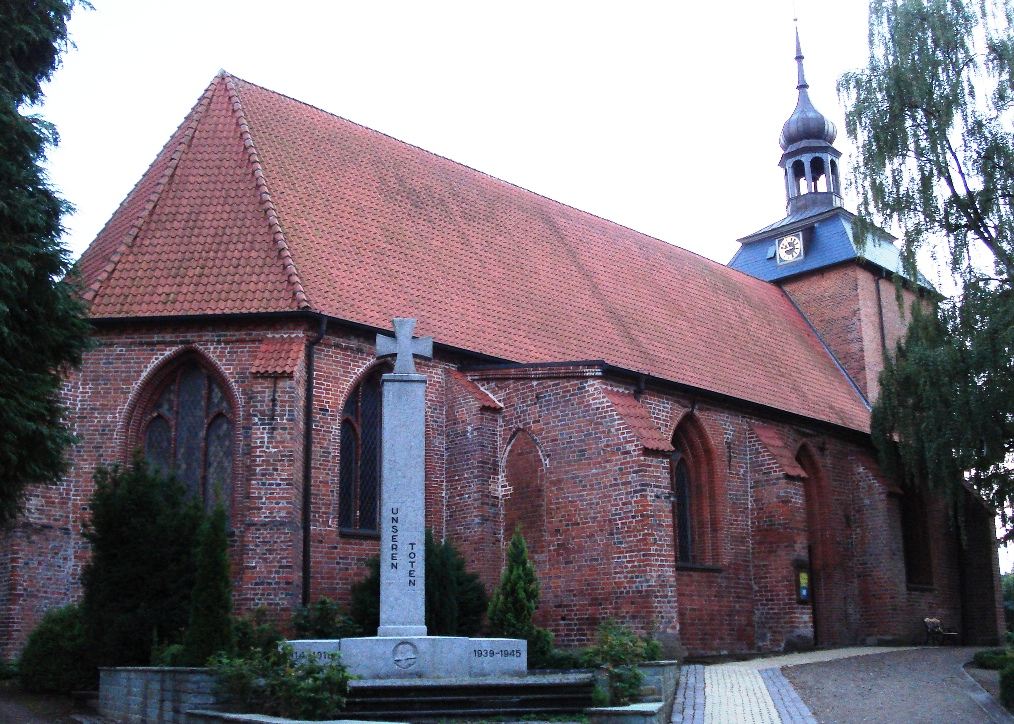
- Marienkirche

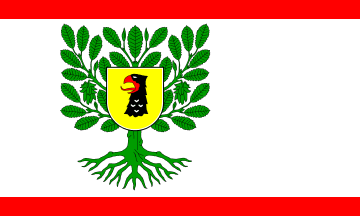
- Flag Coat of arms

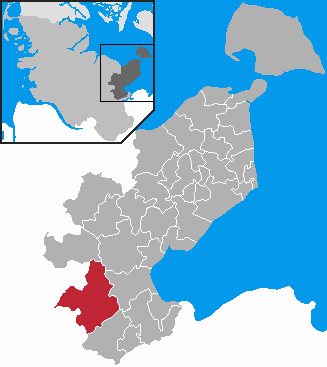
- Location of Ahrensbök within Ostholstein district
- Interactive map of Ahrensbök
- Location within Germany Location within Schleswig-Holstein
- Coordinates: 54°1′N 10°35′E
- Country: Germany
- State: Schleswig-Holstein
- District: Ostholstein

Government
  - Mayor: Andreas Zimmermann

Area
  - Total: 95.38 km^{2} (36.83 sq mi)
- Elevation: 55 m (180 ft)

Population (2025-12-31)
  - Total: 8,012
  - Density: 84.00/km^{2} (217.6/sq mi)
- Time zone: UTC+01:00 (CET)
  - Summer (DST): UTC+02:00 (CEST)
- Postal codes: 23620–23623
- Dialling codes: 04525, 04505
- Vehicle registration: OH
- Website: www.ahrensboek.de

Ahrensbök (Holsatian: Ahrensböök) is a municipality in the district of Ostholstein, in Schleswig-Holstein, Germany. It is situated approximately 17 km northwest of Lübeck, and 45 km southeast of Kiel.

== History ==
Ahrensbök came into existence after the foundation here of a pilgrimage chapel in 1280. The first documentary reference to the settlement dates from 1328. In 1348, the place was devastated by the Black Death.

In 1397, the Carthusians founded a monastery here, Ahrensbök Charterhouse, which helped the place grow in prominence. In 1564, the Amt Ahrensbök, or district of Ahrensbök, was established as a civil administration unit, and between 1593 and 1601 a castle was built, Schloss Hoppenbrook, on the site and with the materials of the charterhouse, which had been secularised in the 1580s during the Protestant Reformation and subsequently demolished. In 1623, Schloss Hoppenbrook became for a few years the residence of the newly established Duchy of Schleswig-Holstein-Sonderburg-Plön, until the completion of the dukes' new castle at Plön in 1636, after which Schloss Hoppenbrook became a secondary residence. In 1746, Duke Friedrich Karl abolished serfdom in his duchy. In 1765, after the death of his widow, the castle was demolished.

A cattle and horse market was established in the town in 1791, which was replaced in 1832 by a regular weekly market. On the site of the former castle the Amtshaus, or town hall, was built in 1826. During the Second Schleswig War of 1864 Ahrensbök fell for a short time under the control of first the Austrians and then the Prussians. In 1867, a district court was established here. In the same year, after the Austro-Prussian War, the district of Ahrensbök was given to the Grand Duchy of Oldenburg as compensation for their hereditary claims on the newly-Prussian territory of Holstein.

On 3 September 1872, a great fire destroyed 22 houses and 10 other structures in Ahrensbök. In 1877, the area was divided in two, an urban district and a rural district. The railway line from Ahrensbök to Pönitz was opened with much ceremony in 1886.

Between 1912 and 1933, Ahrensbök held the status of "Town (2nd Class)". In 1928, a private school was built in the Lindenstrasse, which has been used since 1950 as a Mittelschule and Realschule. Also in 1928, the town celebrated its 600th anniversary.

In 1933, Ahrensbök lost its municipal status and became a Gemeinde (community) with 19 villages within the boundaries as they now are. The district court was abolished.

In April 1945, Jewish prisoners from Fürstengrube, a satellite camp of Auschwitz, were marched through Ahrensbök on the Fürstengrube death march. There is now a memorial here to the casualties. After World War II thousands of displaced persons and refugees were resettled here: the population rose from 5,063 in 1939 to 10,169 in 1950.

During the local government reform of 1970 Ahrensbök together with the former Eutin district became part of the Ostholstein district. In 1972, the Grundschule and Hauptschule was re-established as a village group school (Dörfergemeinschaftsschule), when the separate village schools were closed. In 1982, the ZOB plant was built in the Lindenstrasse.

Since March 1985 the local government administration of the Gemeinde has been accommodated in the new town hall (Rathaus) near the site of the former castle and the Amtshaus (demolished in 1983).

In 1988, the railway line was closed.

== People connected with Ahrensbök ==
- Friedrich Bleek (1793 in Ahrensbök – 1859, in Bonn) was a German Biblical scholar.
- Nelly Mann (1898–1944), wife of Heinrich Mann
- Gerhard Steen (1923–1990), politician (SPD)

== See also ==
- Gnissau
