= Hans the Younger, Duke of Schleswig-Holstein-Sonderburg =

Duke of Schleswig-Holstein-Sonderburg (1545–1622)

Hans the Younger
- Duke of Schleswig-Holstein-Sonderburg
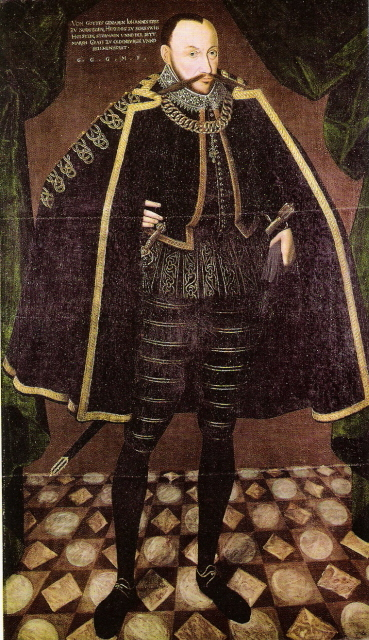
- Born: 25 March 1545; Haderslev, Denmark-Norway
- Died: 9 October 1622 (aged 77); Glücksburg, Duchy of Schleswig-Holstein-Gottorp, Holy Roman Empire
- Spouse: Elisabeth of Brunswick-Grubenhagen (m. 1568; died 1586) Agnes Hedwig of Anhalt (m. 1588; died 1616)
- Issue more...: Christian, Duke of Schleswig-Holstein-Sonderburg-Ærø; Alexander, Duke of Schleswig-Holstein-Sonderburg; John Adolph, Duke of Schleswig-Holstein-Sønderburg-Norburg; Elisabeth, Duchess of Pomerania; Frederick, Duke of Schleswig-Holstein-Sonderburg-Norburg; Margaret, Countess of Nassau-Siegen; Philip, Duke of Schleswig-Holstein-Sonderburg-Glücksburg; Joachim Ernest, Duke of Schleswig-Holstein-Sonderburg-Plön; Eleonore Sophie of Schleswig-Holstein-Sonderburg
- House: Oldenburg
- Father: Christian III of Denmark
- Mother: Dorothea of Saxe-Lauenburg

Hans the Younger (also John the Younger, Danish: Hans den Yngre; German: Johann der Jüngere; 25 March 1545 – 9 October 1622) was the duke of Schleswig-Holstein-Sonderburg.

== Biography ==
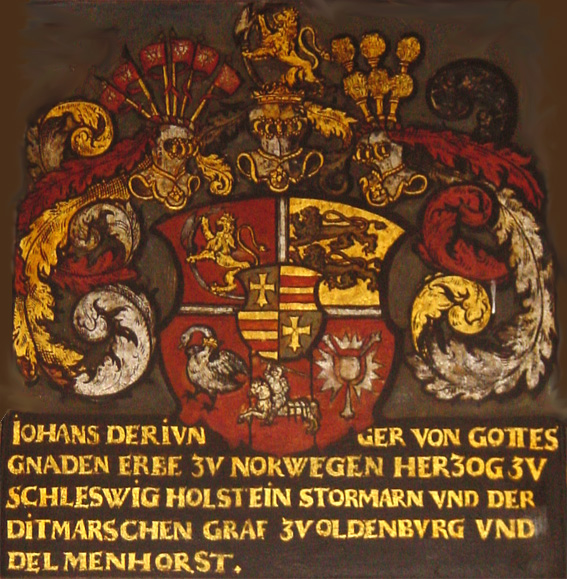
Escutcheon of Hans the Younger in the chapel of Sønderborg Castle.

Hans was born on 25 March 1545 at Koldinghus Castle in Jutland, Denmark as the fourth child and third son of King Christian III of Denmark and Norway and his wife, Dorothea of Saxe-Lauenburg. When Christian III died in 1559, he left three sons. Where the eldest, Frederick II, had long ago been appointed successor to the thrones of Denmark and Norway, all three brothers were in principle equally entitled to the father's share of the duchies of Schleswig and Holstein. To avoid unfortunate divisions of the royal part of the duchies, attempts were made to find suitable positions for the younger brothers elsewhere. The middle brother, Magnus, consequently, gave up his right of inheritance when Frederick II had him placed as prince-bishop of Ösel-Wiek in Livonia.

However, the plan to secure Hans the post of the prince-archbishop's successor in the Archdiocese of Bremen failed due to strong competition from North German princes. Other options abroad were thwarted because Denmark needed the support of the North German princes against Sweden in the Nordic Seven Years' War, and the king could not act as a competitor in acquiring lucrative offices and benefices for his brother. Consequently, Frederick had to agree to share his father's share of the duchies with his youngest brother, and allotted him a portion of the duchies with Sonderburg (today Danish Sønderborg) as his ducal seat.

He acted actively in the Danish government, for example supporting his sister-in-law, the Queen, when his nephew, Christian IV of Denmark, was underage. There were plans for him to marry the Dowager Queen in 1588 or 1589, repudiating his second, young wife. Hans died in Glücksburg.

== Marriages and children ==
Hans married twice. Firstly, he married in Kolding on August 19, 1568 Elisabeth of Brunswick-Grubenhagen (20 March 1550 Salzderhelden – 11 February 1586 Østerholm), daughter of Ernest III, Duke of Brunswick-Grubenhagen and Princess Margarethe of Pommerania-Wolgast (1518–1569). They had 14 children:

1. Dorothea (9 October 1569 Kolding – 5 July 1593 Legnica), married on 23 November 1589 to Frederick IV, Duke of Legnica.
2. Christian (24 October 1570 – 4 June 1633), Duke of Ærø
3. Ernest (17 January 1572 – 26 October 1596)
4. Alexander (20 January 1573 – 13 May 1627), Duke of Sonderburg
5. August (26 July 1574 – 26 October 1596)
6. Marie, Abbess of Itzehoe (22 August 1575 – 6 December 1640)
7. John Adolph (17 September 1576 – 21 February 1624), Duke of Norburg
8. Anna (7 October 1577 – 30 January 1616), married on 31 May 1601 to Bogislaw XIII, Duke of Pomerania.
9. Sophia (30 May 1579 – 3 June 1658, in Treptow an der Rega, her dower), married on 8 March 1607 to Philip II, Duke of Pomerania-Stettin
10. Elisabeth (24 September 1580 – 21 December 1653), married on 19 February 1615 to Bogislaw XIV, Duke of Pomerania (son of her sister Anna's husband, Bogislaw XIII).
11. Frederick (26 October 1581 – 22 July 1658), Duke of Norburg; married on 1 August 1627 to Juliana, daughter of Francis II, Duke of Saxe-Lauenburg.
12. Margaret (24 February 1583 – 20 April 1658), married on 27 August 1603 to John VII, Count of Nassau-Siegen.
13. Philip (15 March 1584 – 27 September 1663), Duke of Ærø
14. Albrecht (16 April 1585 – 30 April 1613)

Secondly, he married on 14 February 1588 Princess Agnes Hedwig of Anhalt (12 March 1573 Dessau – 3 November 1616 Sønderborg), and they had nine children:

1. Eleonore (4 April 1590 – 13 April 1669)
2. Anna Sabine (7 March 1593 – 18 July 1659), married on 1 January 1618 to Julius Frederick, Duke of Württemberg-Weiltingen.
3. Johann Georg (9 February 1594 – 25 January 1613)
4. Joachim Ernest (29 August 1595 – 5 October 1671), Duke of Schleswig-Holstein-Sonderburg-Plön
5. Dorothea Sibylle (13 July 1597 – 21 August 1597)
6. Dorothea Marie (23 July 1599 – 27 March 1600)
7. Bernhard (12 April 1601 – 26 April 1601)
8. Agnes Magdalene (17 November 1602 – 17 May 1607)
9. Eleonore Sophie (24 February 1603 – 5 January 1675), married on 28 February 1625 to Christian II, Prince of Anhalt-Bernburg.

== See also ==
- History of Denmark
- History of Schleswig-Holstein
