= Dorothea Christina von Aichelberg =

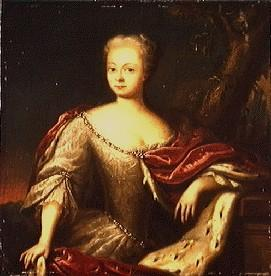
- Dorothea Christina von Aichelberg, detail from a family portrait
- Born: 23 January 1674; Plön
- Died: 22 June 1762 (aged 88); Reinfeld
- Buried: 30 June 1762; Ducal crypt in Plön Castle
- Noble family: von Aichelberg
- Spouse: Prince Christian Charles of Schleswig-Holstein-Sonderburg-Plön-Norburg
- Father: John Francis von Aichelberg
- Mother: Anna Sophia von Trautenburg gennant Beyern

Dorothea Christina von Aichelberg (alternative spellings: Dorothee, Dorothy, Chritine, Christiane, von Echelberg, von Aichelburg; 23 January 1674 in Plön – 22 June 1762 in Reinfeld) was the wife of Prince Christian Charles of Schleswig-Holstein-Sonderburg-Plön-Norburg as Frau von Karlstein. Later, as a widow and mother of Frederick Charles, she stood for many years at the center of a succession dispute.

== Life ==
Dorothea Christina was the daughter of Johann Franz von Aichelberg (1629–1692), Hofmeister and bailiff in Norburg, and his wife, Anna Sophia von Trautenburg gennant Beyer (1637–1694). Her father belonged to a Roman Catholic Carinthian family whose nobility had been confirmed as of the early 16th century. In the Habsburgs' Hereditary Lands the Aichelbergs' would receive elevation to the baronial title in 1655 and to the comital title in 1787.

As a young woman Dorothea was court lady of Duchess Elizabeth Charlotte. After the death of Duke Augustus and the accession of his son, Joachim Frederick in 1699, she followed the duchess to her dower house at Østerholm on Als. Here, she developed a relationship with Joachim Frederick's younger brother, Christian Charles, who at the time served as a colonel in the army of Brandenburg-Prussia. When his father died, he had only inherited the manors of Sebygaard and Gottesgabe on Ærø island, which his uncle Bernhard had held earlier. He estimated that probably every nobleman in this country is wealthier than me. He held that, under these circumstances, Dorothea Christina would appear to be an appropriate spouse. However, both the court in Norburg and his relatives opposed a morganatic marriage.

In this situation, Dorothea Christina received an invitation to the court in Dillenburg. Christian Charles followed her and they rendez-voused in Frankfurt-am-Main. They were married by Superintendent Johann Jacob Müller at Curti Castle in Groß-Umstadt. Their witnesses were the host, high bailiff Carl Wilhelm von Curti, and his wife Anna Helena Schenk zu Schweinsberg.

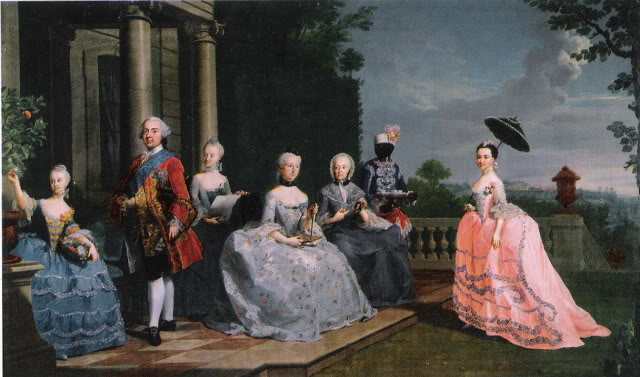
Dorothea Christina with the family of her son Frederick Charles in the Garden of Traventhal House, painting by Johann Heinrich Tischbein (1759), from left to right: Princess Louise Albertine, Duke Frederick Charles, Princess Friederike Sophie, Duchess Christine Armgard, Dorothea Christina, an African servant, Princess Charlotte Amalie Wilhelmine

The wedding was initially kept secret, however Charles I, Landgrave of Hesse-Kassel told his sister Charlotte Amalie, the Queen of Denmark, about it, and she told the ducal family. Duke Joachim Frederick challenged the status of the marriage, insisting that it be declared morganatic. However, despite the fact that Dorothea Christina was able to prove her pure noble descent by generations back Joachim Frederick forced his brother to accept a settlement. The settlement was prepared by the court, signed by both brothers in Norburg on 24 November 1702 and confirmed by the Danish king on 5 December 1702. In the settlement, Christian Charles renounced any share of the Schleswig-Holstein inheritance on behalf of himself, his wife, and any children they might have. This meant that the family's territory, which was very small already, would not be further fragmented. If, however, the descendants of Joachim Frederick were to die out in the male line, then Christian Charles's descendants would be reinstated as heirs. Meanwhile, Christian Charles and his family would take the family name von Karlstein.

A loophole in the settlement was that it did not specify what would happen if the Schleswig-Holstein-Sonderburg-Plön ducal branch were to die out. Under the terms of the will of Duke Augustus, Plön would then fall to Joachim Frederick and Norburg would fall to Christian Charles. This might have appeared highly unlikely in 1702, but it nevertheless happened only four years later: Duke John Adolph of Plön and his son Adolph Augustus both died in 1704, leaving Plön in the hands of Adolph Augustus's two-year-old son Leopold Augustus. Leopold Augustus then died in 1706, leaving Plön to Joachim Frederick.

Christian Charles and Dorothea Christina initially had two daughters: Charlotte (b. 1703; died young) and Augusta (13 September 1704 – 1749). Christian Charles died of smallpox on 23 May 1706. On 4 August 1706, their son Frederick Charles was born posthumously. After her husband's death, Dorothea Christina lived another 56 years as a widow. She spent the next several years suing for her son's right to inherit Plön. She was assisted by her legal representative Count Frederick von Reventlow, Hansen von Ehrencron and C.G. von John, who had been appointed guardians of her son by the King. Her claim was supported by the opinions of the law school of the University of Kiel and foreign lawyers, such as Johann Peter von Ludewig and Christian Thomasius. Their view was the marriage had not been morganatic originally and that the 1702 agreement had not made it morganatic either. Nevertheless, Joachim Frederick refused to acknowledge his nephew's eligibility to inherit. He was still hoping to have a son himself. However, his two marriages only brought him daughters and he died in 1772, deeply in debt and without a male heir.

King Frederick IV of Denmark finally recognized Frederick Charles as a true and born Duke of Schleswig and Holstein and raised Christina Dorothea to princely rank in two letters patent, dated 18 and 19 December 1722. However, this recognition was only valid for the Schleswig parts of Schleswig-Holstein-Sonderburg-Plön which stood under Danish suzerainty. Frederick Charles's cousin John Ernest from the Schleswig-Holstein-Sonderburg-Plön-Rethwisch line still claimed the Holstein parts of Schleswig-Holstein-Sonderburg-Plön, which stood under imperial suzerainty. Consequently, Frederick Charles could only take up the government of Schleswig-Holstein-Sonderburg-Plön after John Ernest died on 24 May 1729. In 1731, he was finally recognized by the Aulic council. For Dorothea Christina, this meant that her marriage was finally recognized as "proper and legitimate".

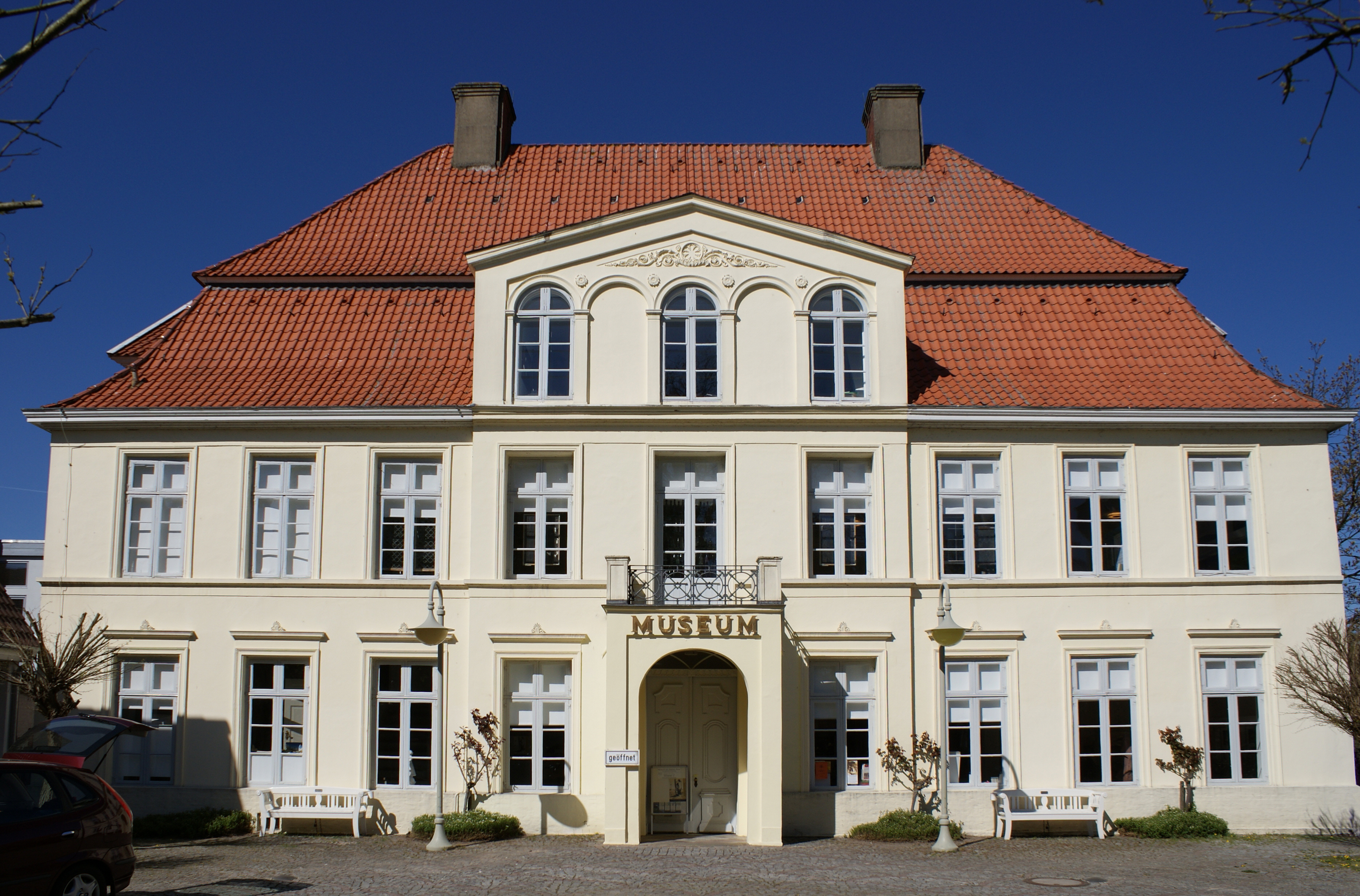
Her widow seat in Plön

Dorothea lived the rest of her life at her dower house in Reinfeld and the Widow's Palace in Plön. She died at a very advanced age on 22 June 1762 in Reinfeld, of a chest disease. She was buried on 30 June 1752 in the ducal crypt at Plön Castle. She left money to the orphanage in Plön, which she had founded in 1746; to pauper's relief in Reinfeld; and to the preacher's widow fund in Reinfeld.

The Dukes of Schleswig-Holstein-Sonderburg-Augustenburg and of Anhalt-Bernburg are among her descendants.

== Issue ==
The couple had the following children:

- Charlotte Amalie Ernestine (1703 – died as a child)
- Wilhelmina Augusta (1704–1749), married in 1731 with Count Conrad Detlev von Reventlow (1704–1749), the eldest son of Count Christian Detlev von Reventlow
- Frederick Charles (1706–1761)
