= Frederick Charles, Duke of Schleswig-Holstein-Sonderburg-Plön =

German duke (1706–1761)

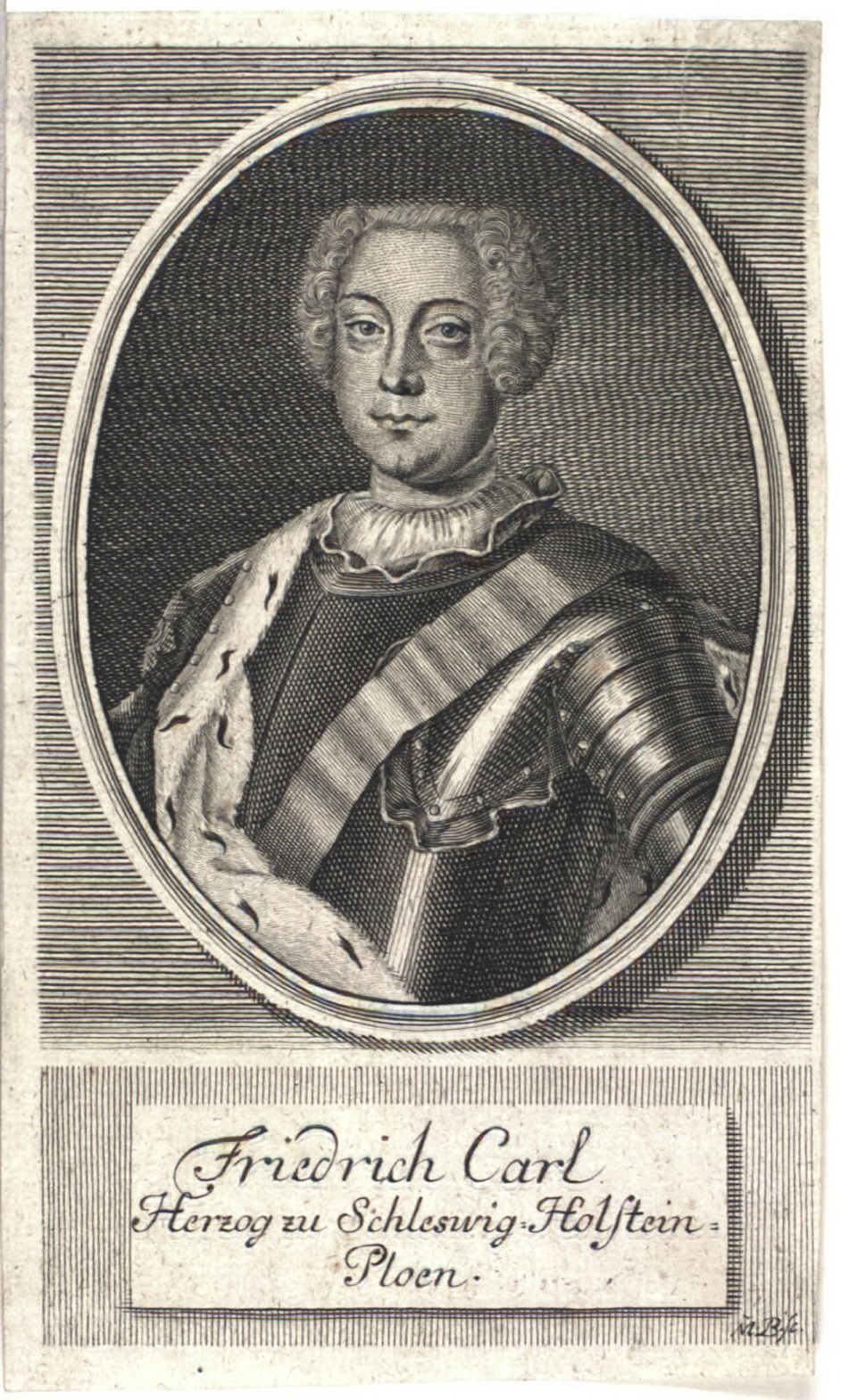
- Frederick Charles of Schleswig-Holstein-Sonderburg-Plön, mid-18th-century engraving
- Born: 4 August 1706; Sønderborg castle
- Died: 19 October 1761 (aged 55); Traventhal
- Spouse: Christine Ermegaard Reventlow
- Issue: Charlotte Amalie Wilhelmine, Duchess of Schleswig-Holstein-Sonderburg-Augustenburg
- House: House of Oldenburg
- Father: Prince Christian Charles of Schleswig-Holstein-Sonderburg-Plön-Norburg
- Mother: Dorothea Christina von Aichelberg

Frederick Charles of Schleswig-Holstein-Sonderburg-Plön (4 August 1706 in Sønderborg – 18–19 October 1761 in Traventhal), known as Friedrich Karl or Friedrik Carl of Holstein-Plön, was a member of a cadet branch of the Danish royal family and the last duke of the Duchy of Schleswig-Holstein-Sonderburg-Plön (or Holstein-Plön), a Danish royal prince, and a knight of the Order of the Elephant. When he died without a male heir born of his marriage to Countess Christine Armgard von Reventlow, rule of the Duchy of Holstein-Plön returned to the Danish crown.

== Early life ==
Frederick Charles was born on August 4, 1706, at Sønderborg castle, the posthumous and only son of Christian Charles (1674–1706), a brother of Duke Joachim Frederick of Schleswig-Holstein-Sonderburg-Plön. That duke died in 1722 without closer male heirs than his nephew, who in time succeeded his uncle as partitioned-off duke of Schleswig-Holstein-Sonderburg-Plön.

Frederick Charles's accession was delayed until 1729 because his father had contracted a morganatic marriage with his mother, Dorothea Christina von Aichelberg, who was recognised as a Danish princess by the King only years after her husband's death.

== The Baroque ruler ==
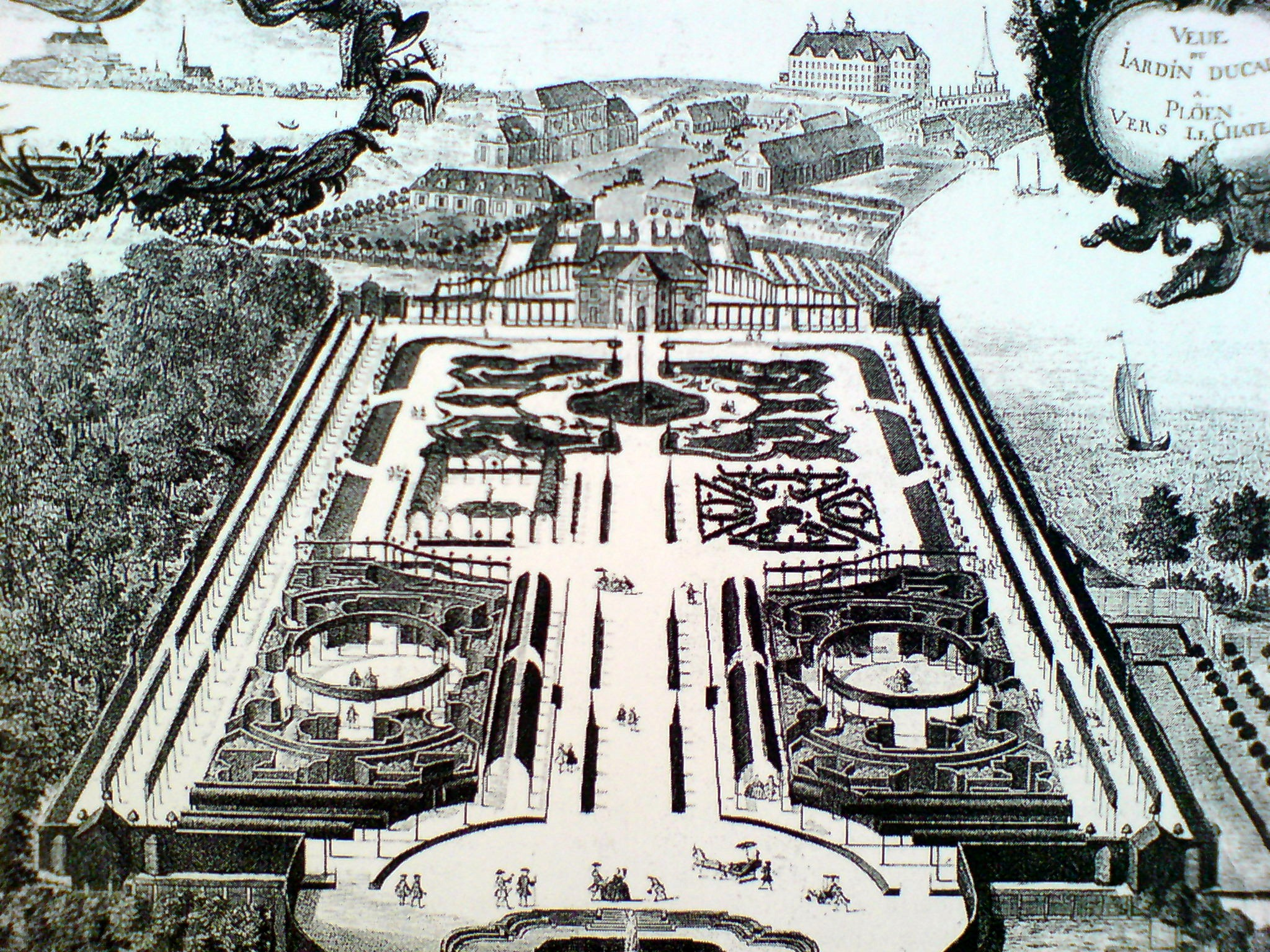
The gardens of Plön Castle at the time of Frederick Charles, 1749.

Plön enjoyed a vibrant cultural life under Frederick Charles's rule and artistic patronage. The duke designed, built, and rebuilt residences and gardens in the baroque and rococo styles, some of which still stand (the ducal Plön Castle and the so-called "Princes' House" in Plön among them). Others no longer exist (of particular note is the ducal summer residence in Traventhal, demolished in the nineteenth century).

As no son born of Frederick Charles's marriage survived, in 1756 he concluded a family pact with Frederick V of Denmark, naming the king his successor to the duchy of Plön. The provisions were fulfilled just five years later, when Frederick Charles died, at his little palace in Traventhal, in the night of October 18–19, 1761.

== Family ==
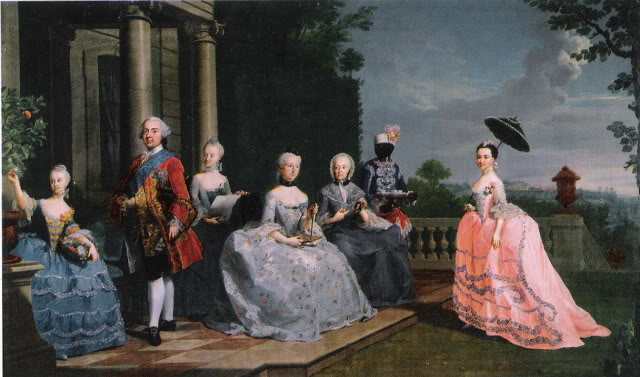
Frederick Charles, his wife, his three younger daughters, his mother, and a servant in the garden of Schloss Traventhal, 1759.

Frederick Charles had six children from his marriage with Countess Christine Armgard von Reventlow (1711–1779), a daughter of the Danish general Christian Detlev, Count von Reventlow, and niece of the Danish queen consort Anne Sophie von Reventlow, who, as had his mother, had been born into a non-dynastic noble family:

1. Princess Sophia Christine Luise of Schleswig-Holstein-Sonderburg-Plön (November 5, 1732, Plön – March 18, 1757, Quedlinburg), a canoness of Quedlinburg Abbey.
2. Princess Fredericka Sophie Charlotte of Schleswig-Holstein-Sonderburg-Plön (November 18, 1736, Plön – January 4, 1769, Schönberg), who married Georg Ludwig II of Erbach-Schönberg (1723-1777), son of George August, Count of Erbach-Schönberg.
3. Prince Christian Charles of Schleswig-Holstein-Sonderburg-Plön (November 2, 1738, Plön – February 27, 1740, Plön), who died in infancy.
4. Stillborn child (March 1741, Plön).
5. Princess Charlotte Amalie Wilhelmine of Schleswig-Holstein-Sonderburg-Plön (April 23, 1744, Plön – October 11, 1770, Augustenburg), who married Frederick Christian I of Schleswig-Holstein-Sonderburg-Augustenburg and who became a great-great-grandmother of the last German empress.
6. Princess Louise Albertine of Schleswig-Holstein-Sonderburg-Plön (July 21, 1748, Plön – March 2, 1770, Ballenstedt), who married Frederick Albert of Anhalt-Bernburg.

Additionally, Frederick Charles had children by two mistresses: by Sophie Agnes Olearius, with whom he conducted a six-year liaison, six daughters; and by his maîtresse-en-titre, Maria Catharina Bein, sister of the court chamberlain, three sons (two of whom died childless) and two daughters (one of whom died in childhood), all of whom the duke recognized and legitimated, and on whom (or their mothers) he bestowed lands, titles, and money. On the 30 January 2024 episode of Finding Your Roots, it was shown that Frederick Charles is a sixth-great-grandfather of American actor Bob Odenkirk, through his mistress Maria Catharina Bein and his last surviving son, Friedrich Carl Steinholz.

== Ancestry ==
Ancestors of Frederick Charles, Duke of Schleswig-Holstein-Sonderburg-Plön

8. Joachim Ernest, Duke of Schleswig-Holstein-Sonderburg-Plön
4. Augustus, Duke of Schleswig-Holstein-Sonderburg-Plön-Norburg
9. Duchess Dorothea Auguste of Holstein-Gottorp
2. Prince Christian Charles of Schleswig-Holstein-Sonderburg-Plön-Norburg
10. Frederick, Prince of Anhalt-Harzgerode
5. Elisabeth Charlotte, Princess of Anhalt-Harzgerode
11. Princess Johanna Elisabeth of Nassau-Hadamar
1. Frederick Charles, Duke of Schleswig-Holstein-Sonderburg-Plön
12. Christoph von Aichelburg
6. Johann Franz von Aichelburg
13. Helene Marie Klenke
3. Dorothea Christina von Aichelberg
14. Karl von Trautenburg
7. Anne Sophie von Trautenburg
15. Sophie von Ahlefeldt

Frederick Charles, Duke of Schleswig-Holstein-Sonderburg-Plön House of Oldenburg Born: 4 August 1706 Died: 18 October 1761
German nobility
Preceded by Joachim Frederick	Duke of Schleswig-Holstein-Sonderburg-Plön; 1722-1761	Succeeded by (Danish crown)
