= Caroline Amalie of Augustenburg =

Queen of Denmark from 1839 to 1848

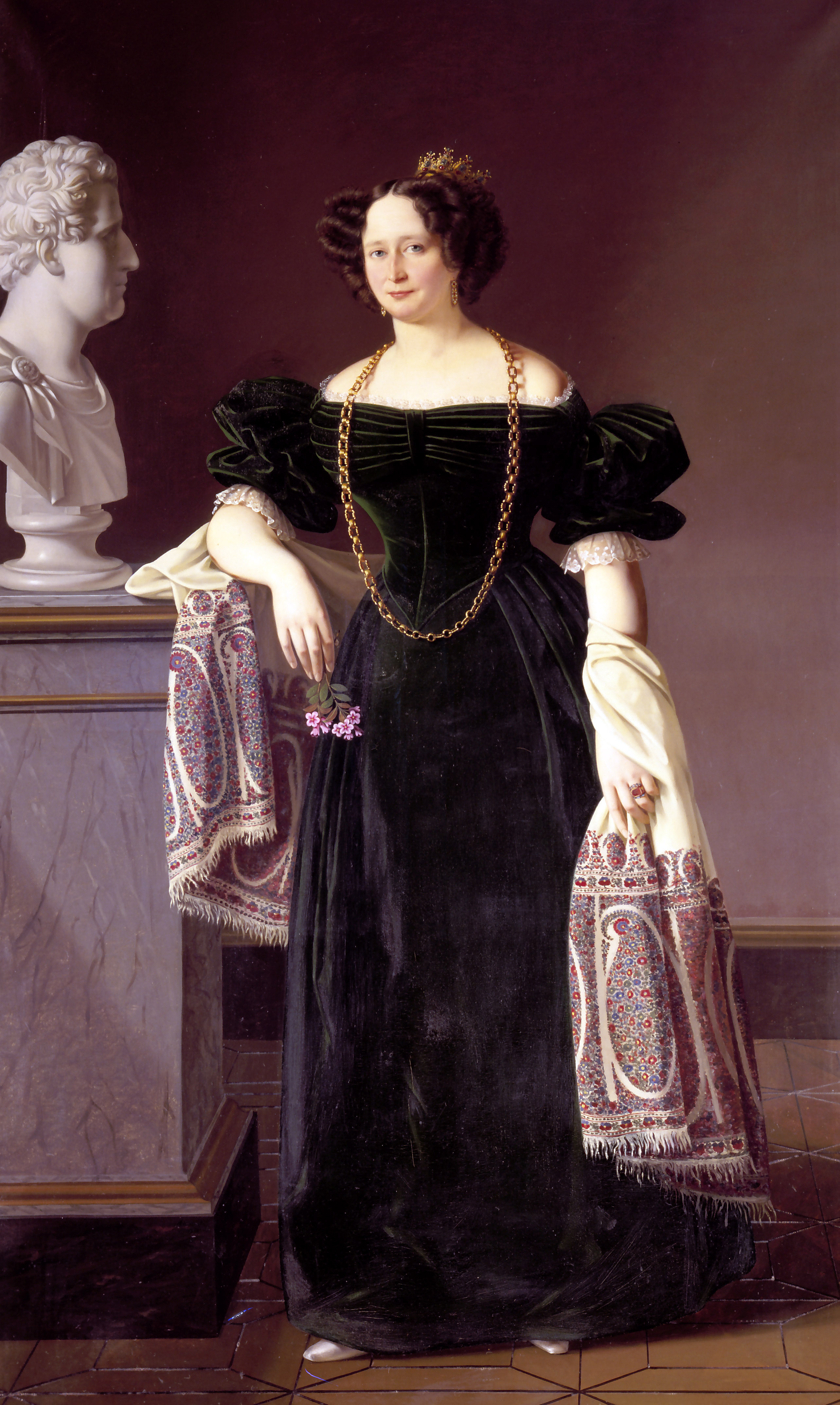
- 1830 portrait

Queen consort of Denmark
- Tenure: 3 December 1839 – 20 January 1848
- Coronation: 28 June 1840; Frederiksborg Palace Chapel
- Born: 28 June 1796; Copenhagen, Denmark
- Died: 9 March 1881 (aged 84); Copenhagen, Denmark
- Burial: Roskilde Cathedral
- Spouse: Christian VIII of Denmark (m. 1815; died 1848)
- House: Schleswig-Holstein-Sonderburg-Augustenburg
- Father: Frederick Christian II, Duke of Schleswig-Holstein-Sonderburg-Augustenburg
- Mother: Princess Louise Auguste of Denmark

Caroline Amalie of Schleswig-Holstein-Sonderburg-Augustenburg (28 June 1796 – 9 March 1881) was Queen of Denmark as the second wife of King Christian VIII between 1839 and 1848.

== Early life ==
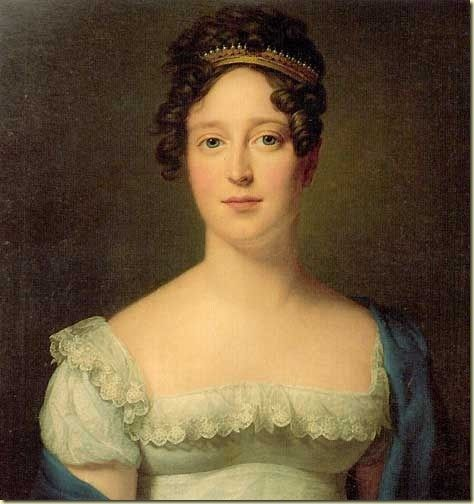
Portrait of the Queen Caroline Amalie in her youth, 1816

Caroline Amalie was the daughter of Frederick Christian II, Duke of Schleswig-Holstein-Sonderburg-Augustenburg, and Princess Louise Auguste of Denmark; Caroline Amalie's mother was the only daughter of Christian VII and his British wife, Queen Caroline Matilde, after whom she was named. She was born in Copenhagen and lived there until 1807, when she moved with her family to Augustenborg. She was given a conventional education for an upper-class girl of her time.

In the conflict between her parents - who disagreed politically and personally - she sided with her mother; Louise Auguste retained an ongoing close relationship with her brother, the king of Denmark, as well as with the Danish court.

== Marriage ==
Her mother introduced her to the heir presumptive to the Danish throne, the future Christian VIII, and encouraged them to marry. Reportedly, Caroline Amalie fell in love with Christian, who found her attractive.

Christian had divorced his first wife, Charlotte Fredericka of Mecklenburg-Schwerin, in 1810 on grounds of adultery. In 1814, he had just returned to Denmark after his abdication of the Norwegian throne. The same year, Christian and Caroline Amalie were engaged. The wedding took place in 1815.

Between 1816 and 1817, the couple lived in Odense, where Christian served as Governor of Fionia. Between 1818 and 1822, they undertook numerous trips through Europe together. They visited various resorts in an attempt to cure their inability to have children. Christian devoted himself to the sciences, mineralogy and geology in particular. While Christian became celebrated for his scientific interests, Caroline Amalie was a composer who wrote numerous piano pieces.

The personal relationship between Caroline Amalie and Christian was described as harmonious and as an image of the contemporary ideal of marriage. Her acceptance of her spouse's infidelity was regarded as something suitable and appropriate within contemporary gender roles. Her amiable personality made her respected and well-liked by the rest of the royal House, and she is described as a good stepmother of her stepson Frederick.

== Queen of Denmark ==
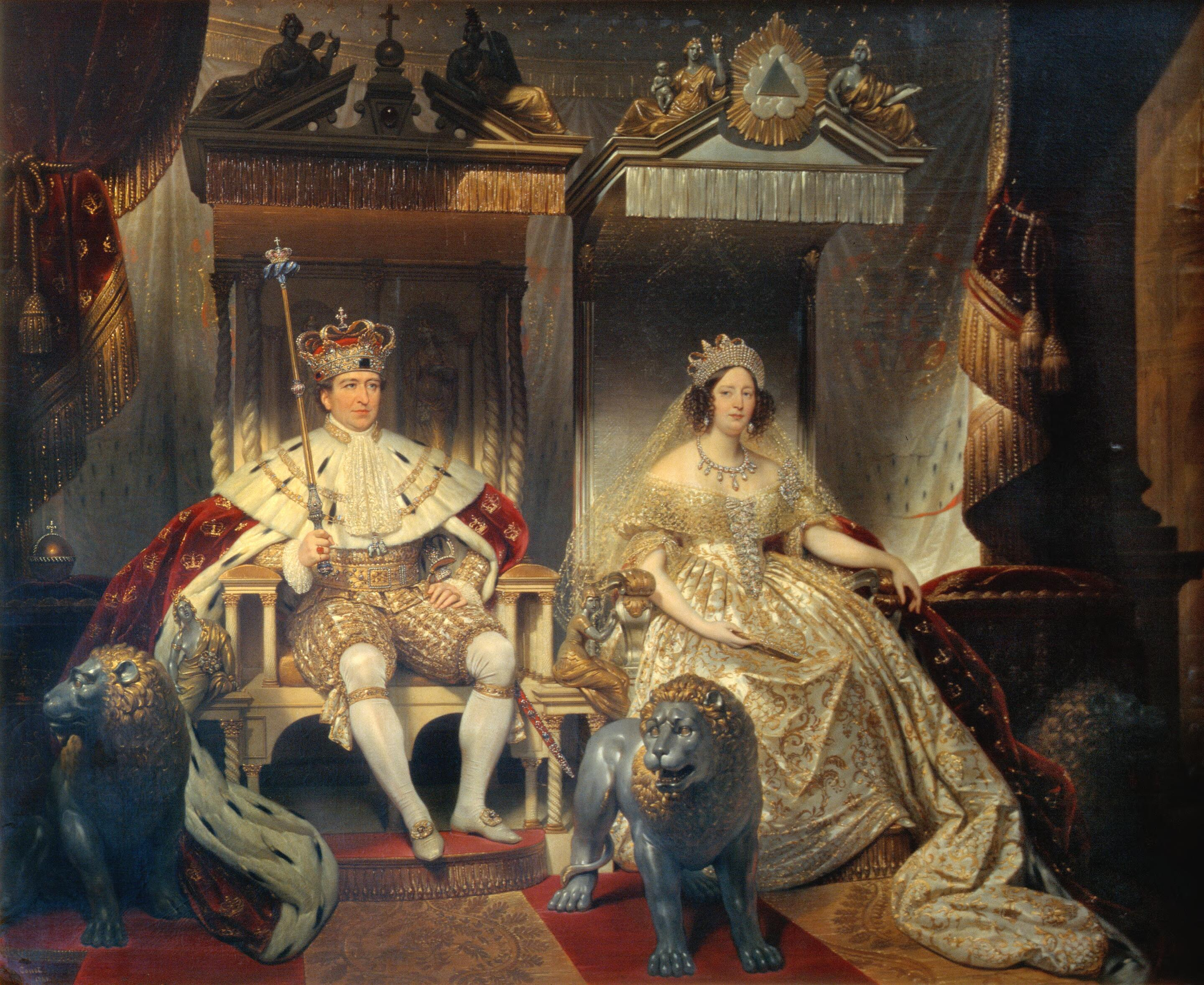
Anointing of Christian VIII and Queen Caroline Amalie on 28 June 1840 in Frederiksborg Palace Chapel. Oil painting by Joseph-Désirée Court (1841).

In 1839, when King Frederick VI died, Caroline Amalie, as the wife of Christian VIII, became Queen of Denmark. She was considered instrumental in the pro-German party on the matter of the duchies of Schleswig-Holstein.

Early on, Caroline Amalie was active in philanthropy. She founded the poor house Dronning Caroline Amalies Asyl in Copenhagen in 1829, the poor house Dronningens Asyl in Odense in 1836, the Kvindelig Plejeforening for the sick and women in childbirth in 1843. Her charitable projects for poor orphans gave her the name "The Poor Children's Mother" and "The Royal Foster Mother of the Little Ones". As hereditary princess and later as queen, she used her position to launch the charitable role as a role model for the female members of the nobility and upper classes, which called for upper-class women to be actively involved in society through philanthropy. By doing so, women found a public and political role acceptable to combine with the popular 19th-century role of a Christian wife and mother in Danish society. Her introduction of a new role model for women is considered to have had a great impact on Danish society.

Caroline Amalie was a follower of the religious ideas of N. F. S. Grundtvig, whose movement she actively supported, such as the Grundtvigian priests P.O. Boisen and Peder Rørdam. In 1841, she founded an orphanage, Dronning Caroline Amalies Asylskole, whose school was inspired by the ideas of Grundtvig. She was not described as an intellectual herself; however, she regarded it as a duty to introduce the representatives of art and literature at court and act as their supporter.

It is not clear whether or not she ever exerted any influence in state affairs. During the conflict between Denmark and the duchies of Schleswig and Holstein, her brothers, Christian August of Augustenborg and Frederick of Nør, came to be in opposition to Christian VIII and Denmark. This caused a difficult situation for Caroline Amalie, who was suspected of conspiring with her brothers against Danish interests, especially by the nationalistic liberals in Copenhagen. This made her unpopular and exposed to some hostility during the last years of Christian's reign.

== Queen Dowager ==
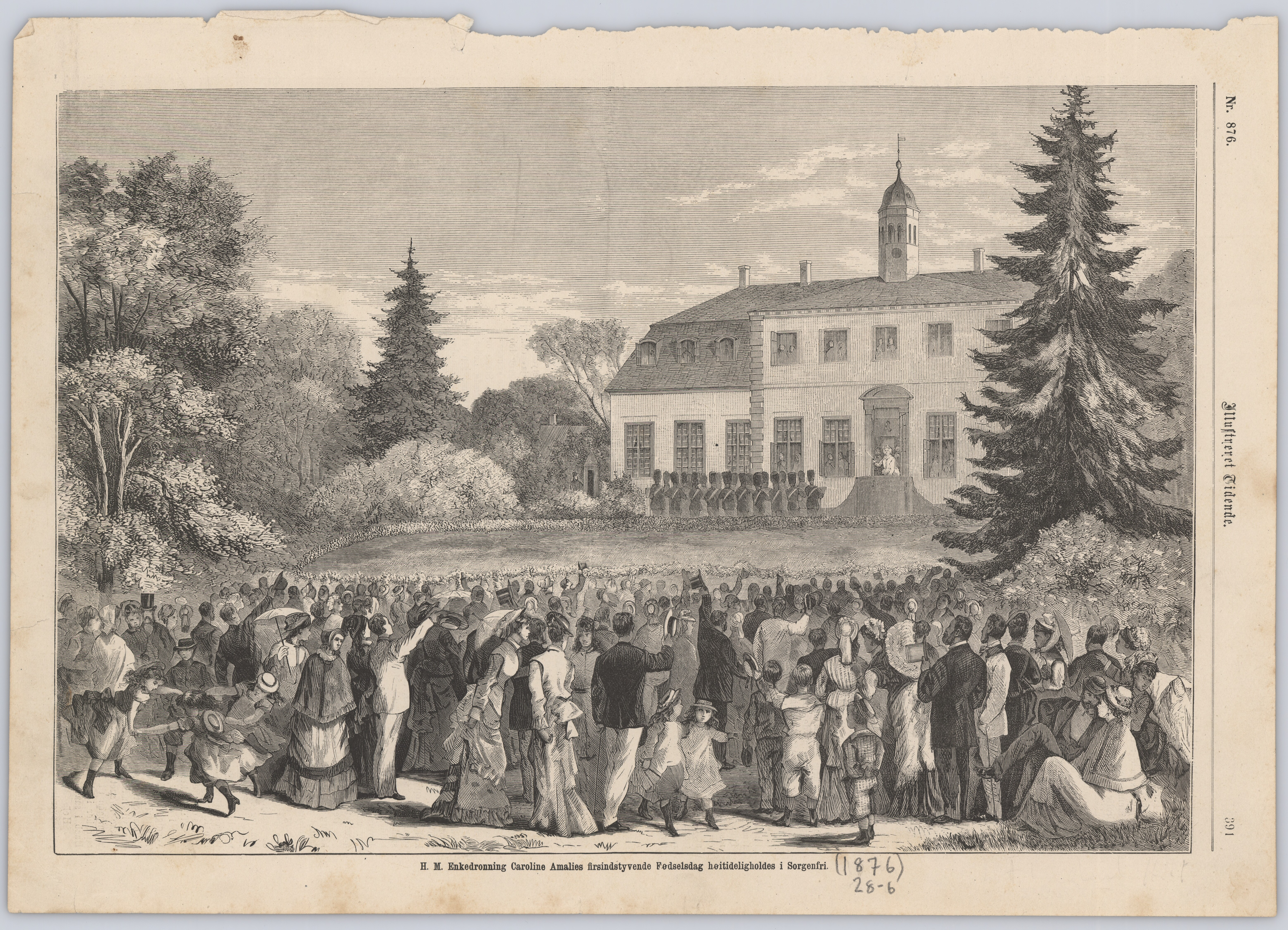
Caroline Amalie's birthday is celebrated at Sorgenfri Palace. Illustration from Illustreret Tidende

Caroline Amalie became a widow in 1848 and survived her spouse for more than thirty years. She took up residence at Sorgenfri Castle north of Copenhagen, but due to ill health she preferred to spend winters in southern Europe. She also outlived her stepson by seventeen years. Hence, she lived to see Christian IX become king with her niece Louise of Hesse-Kassel as queen. She was a godmother of two future Kings (Christian X of Denmark and Haakon VII of Norway) and a future Empress (Maria Feodorovna).

During her life as a queen dowager, she enjoyed more popularity than she did as queen. She continued with her charitable projects: in 1852, she took over as protector of the charitable women's society Det Kvindelige Velgørende Selskab after queen dowager Marie, and in 1863, she encouraged queen Louise to open the deaconess institution.

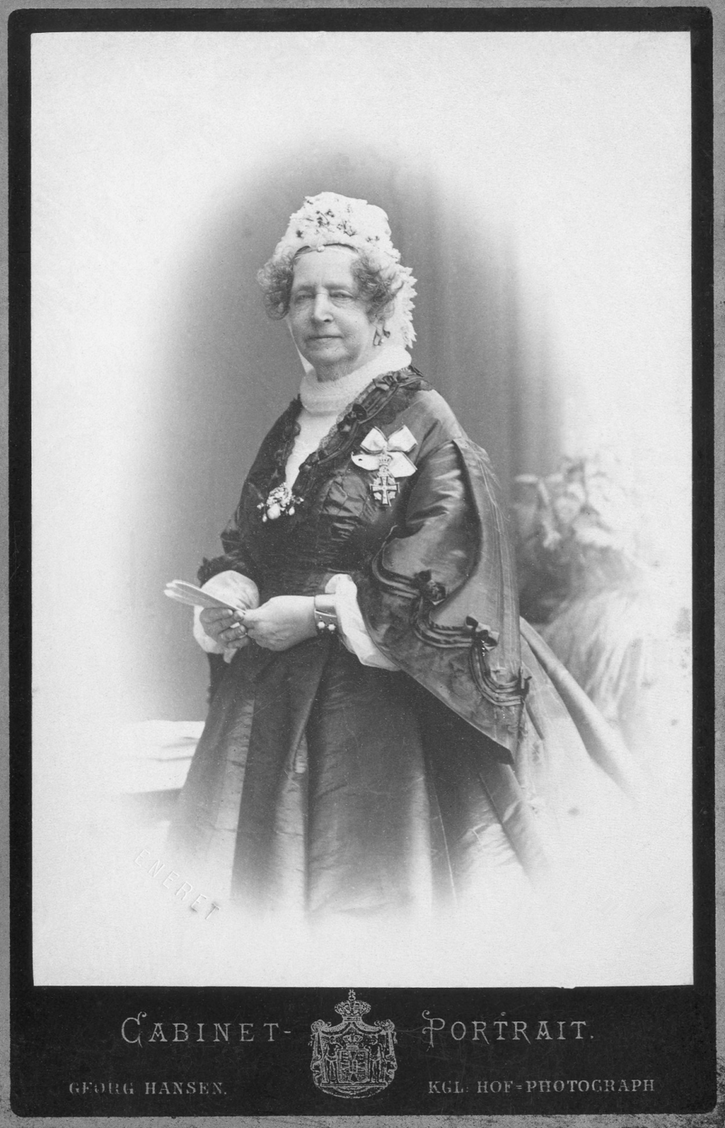
Queen Caroline Amalie in her final years

She died in 1881 and was buried at Roskilde Cathedral next to Christian VIII.

== Ancestry ==
Ancestors of Caroline Amalie of Augustenburg

16. Prince Frederick William of Schleswig-Holstein-Sonderburg-Augustenburg
8. Christian August, Duke of Schleswig-Holstein-Sonderburg-Augustenburg
17. Countess Sophie Amalie of Ahlefeldt-Rixingen
4. Frederick Christian I, Duke of Schleswig-Holstein-Sonderburg-Augustenburg
18. Christian Gyldenløve, Count Danneskiold-Samsøe
9. Countess Frederikke Louise Danneskiold-Samsøe
19. Countess Charlotte Amalie Danneskiold-Laurvig
2. Frederick Christian II, Duke of Schleswig-Holstein-Sonderburg-Augustenburg
20. Prince Christian Charles of Schleswig-Holstein-Sonderburg-Plön-Norburg
10. Frederick Charles, Duke of Schleswig-Holstein-Sonderburg-Plön
21. Dorothea Christina von Aichelberg
5. Princess Charlotte Amalie Wilhelmine of Schleswig-Holstein-Sonderburg-Plön
22. Christian Ditlev, Count Reventlow
11. Countess Christine Ermegaard Reventlow
23. Benedikta Margarethe von Brockdorff
1. Caroline Amalie of Schleswig-Holstein-Sonderburg-Augustenburg
24. Christian VI of Denmark
12. Frederick V of Denmark
25. Princess Sophie Magdalene of Brandenburg-Kulmbach
6. Christian VII of Denmark
26. George II of Great Britain
13. Princess Louisa of Great Britain
27. Princess Caroline of Brandenburg-Ansbach
3. Princess Louise Auguste of Denmark
28. George II of Great Britain (= 26)
14. Frederick, Prince of Wales
29. Princess Caroline of Brandenburg-Ansbach (= 27)
7. Princess Caroline Matilda of Great Britain
30. Frederick II, Duke of Saxe-Gotha-Altenburg
15. Princess Augusta of Saxe-Gotha
31. Princess Magdalena Augusta of Anhalt-Zerbst

Caroline Amalie of Augustenburg House of Schleswig-Holstein-Sonderburg-Augustenburg Cadet branch of the House of Oldenburg Born: 28 July 1796 Died: 9 March 1881
Royal titles
Preceded by Marie Sophie of Hesse-Kassel	Queen consort of Denmark; 1839–1848	Vacant Title next held by Louise of Hesse-Kassel
