= Prince Christian Charles of Schleswig-Holstein-Sonderburg-Plön-Norburg =

Prince Christian Charles
- Born: 20 August 1674; Magdeburg
- Died: 23 May 1706 (aged 31); Sonderburg
- Buried: Norburg
- Noble family: Oldenburg
- Spouse: Dorothea Christina of Aichelberg
- Father: Augustus, Duke of Schleswig-Holstein-Sonderburg-Plön-Norburg
- Mother: Elisabeth Charlotte of Anhalt-Harzgerode

Duke Christian Charles of Schleswig-Holstein-Sonderburg-Plön-Norburg (20 August 1674 – 23 May 1706 in Sonderburg) was an officer in the Brandenburg-Prussian army.

== Life ==
Christian Charles was the younger son of Duke Augustus of Schleswig-Holstein-Sonderburg-Plön-Norburg and Elisabeth Charlotte of Anhalt-Harzgerode. He pursued a career as an officer in the army of Brandenburg-Prussia and was promoted to colonel on November 30, 1697. On January 14, 1705, he was promoted to Major General.

After the death of his father, Duke Augustus, and the accession to power of his older brother Joachim Frederick in 1699, Christian Charles received only a paréage, consisting of the former dominions of his uncle Duke Bernhard of Schleswig-Holstein-Sonderburg-Plön: viz. Søbygård and Gottesgabe, on the island of Ærø.

Christian Charles died of smallpox in 1706. He was initially buried in Norburg. When his son, Frederick Charles, had become Duke of Schleswig-Holstein-Sonderburg-Plön after a long succession dispute, his body was transferred to the ducal crypt in Plön.

=== Marriage and issue ===
Christian Charles was married on February 20, 1702, in Groß-Umstadt to Dorothea Christina of Aichelberg (January 23, 1674 – June 22, 1762), daughter of the bailiff at Norburg, John Francis of Aichelberg. The morganatic and secretly contracted marriage led to an agreement with his reigning brother in which Christian Charles waived princely rights for his descendants and adopted the family name "von Karlstein". Nevertheless, his son Frederick Charles would inherit Schleswig-Holstein-Sonderburg-Plön in 1722, when Joachim Frederick died without a male heir.

The couple had three children:

- Charlotte Amalie (1703 - died as a child)
- Wilhelmina Augusta (1704–1749), married in 1731 with Conrad Detlev of Reventlow, the eldest son of Christian Detlev Reventlow
- Frederick Charles of Schleswig-Holstein-Sonderburg-Plön (1706–1761)
