= Joachim Frederick =

Joachim Frederick may refer to:

- Joachim Frederick, Elector of Brandenburg (1546–1608), Prince-elector of the Margraviate of Brandenburg
- Joachim Frederick of Brieg (1550–1602), Duke of Oława, Wołów, Brzeg, and Legnica
- Joachim Frederick, Duke of Schleswig-Holstein-Sonderburg-Plön (1668–1722), third Duke of Schleswig-Holstein-Plön
