= Widow's Palace, Plön =

Castle in Schleswig-Holstein, Germany

Coordinates: 54°09′29″N 10°24′45″E

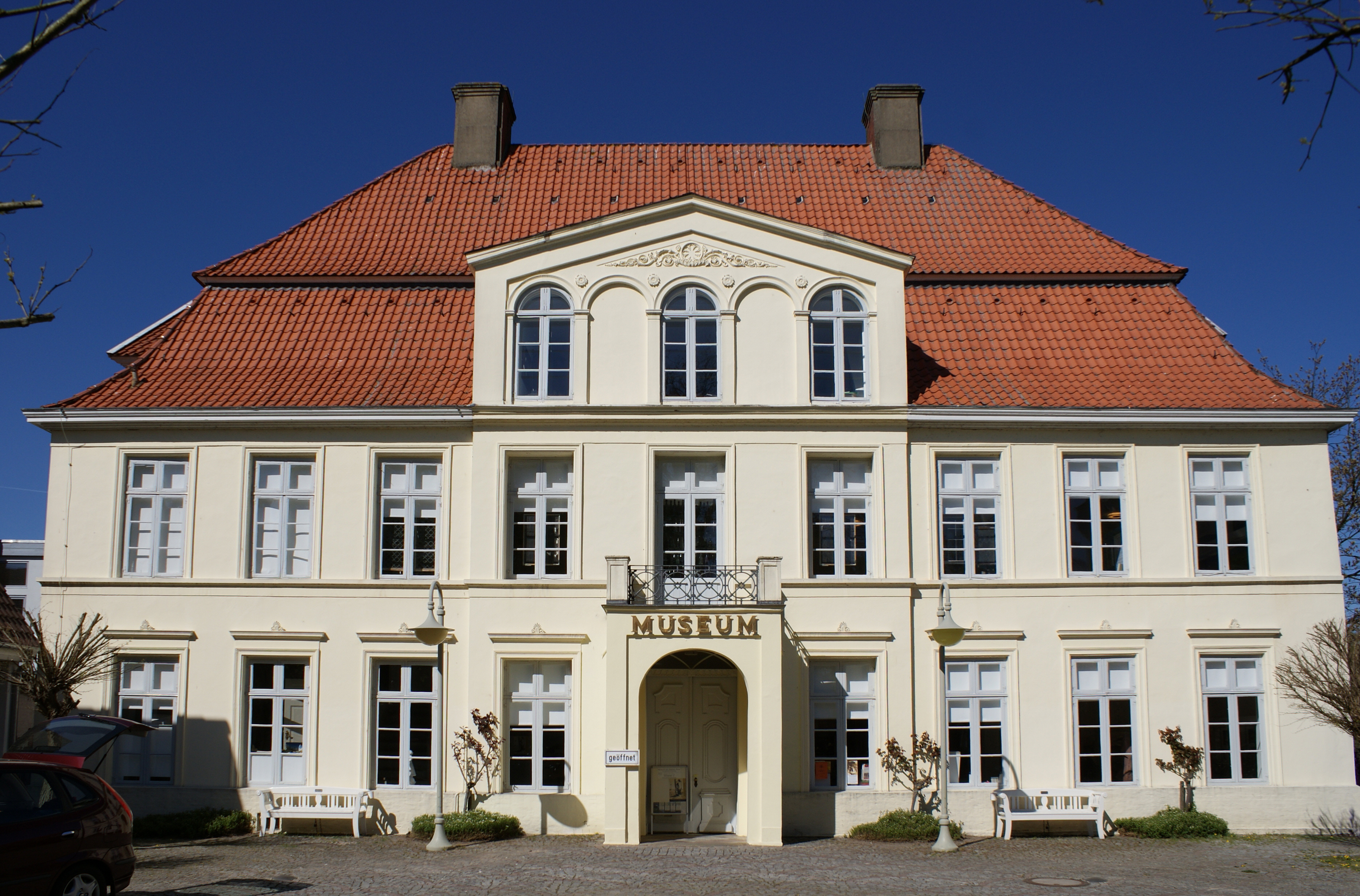
The old Widow's Palace in Plön

The ducal Widow's Palace (German: Witwenpalais) in Plön in the north German state of Schleswig-Holstein was the widow's seat of the Duchess Dorothea Christina (Dorothea Christine). During its history the building has also served as an orphanage and was modified several times. Today it houses Plön's district museum.

== Historical overview ==
The Widow's Palace was originally a stately home dating to the Middle Ages, which was mentioned for the first time around 1385, and was a fief (Burglehen) of nearby Plön Castle. The original building was renovated around 1540 and was used for various purposes, during the rule of the dukes of Plön, including acting as an orphanage from 1685. From 1756 it was extended to become the widow's seat for Dorothea Christina, the mother of Duke Frederick Charles. In the 19th century the court apothecary was moved to the palace. Since the 20th century the building has housed the district museum for the district of Plön.

The barrel-vaulted basement of the palace dates to 1540, after when the building was converted and extended several times. Other alterations to the structure were made in 1639 and 1685, but it was given its present baroque style largely around 1756, although the front was redesigned around 1842 in the classicist style. The palace is a two-storey building under a high mansard roof. It has nine wings and a plastered façade facing the town; its other elevations are in brick. The interior character is that of the 19th century transformation; on the upper floor, the rococo ballroom of 1756, which faces the garden, has been preserved.

== Sources ==
- Hans und Doris Maresch: Schleswig-Holsteins Schlösser, Herrenhäuser und Palais. Husum Verlag, Husum 2006, ISBN 3-89876-278-5
- Dehio: Handbuch der Deutschen Kunstdenkmäler Hamburg, Schleswig-Holstein. Deutscher Kunstverlag, München 1994, ISBN 3-422-03033-6
