= Anhalt-Harzgerode =

Principality

Principality of Anhalt-Harzgerode Fürstentum Anhalt-Harzgerode (German)
- 1635–1709
- 17th century arms of Anhalt principalities

- Anhalt territories 1747-1793, Anhalt-Bernburg (of which Anhalt-Harzgerode was a smaller part) in blue
- Status: Principality
- Capital: Harzgerode
- History
  - Partition of Anhalt-Bernburg: 5 December 1635
  - Reunion with Anhalt-Bernburg: 14 October 1709
Preceded by	Succeeded by
Anhalt-Bernburg	Anhalt-Bernburg

Anhalt-Harzgerode was a small principality of the Holy Roman Empire, ruled by the House of Ascania with its residence at Harzgerode in present-day Saxony-Anhalt. It was created in 1635 following the partition of Anhalt-Bernburg with Frederick, a younger son of Prince Christian I becoming the reigning prince. The death of Frederick's son Prince William Louis in 1709 resulted in the extinction of the ruling family and Anhalt-Harzgerode was reunited with Anhalt-Bernburg.

== History ==
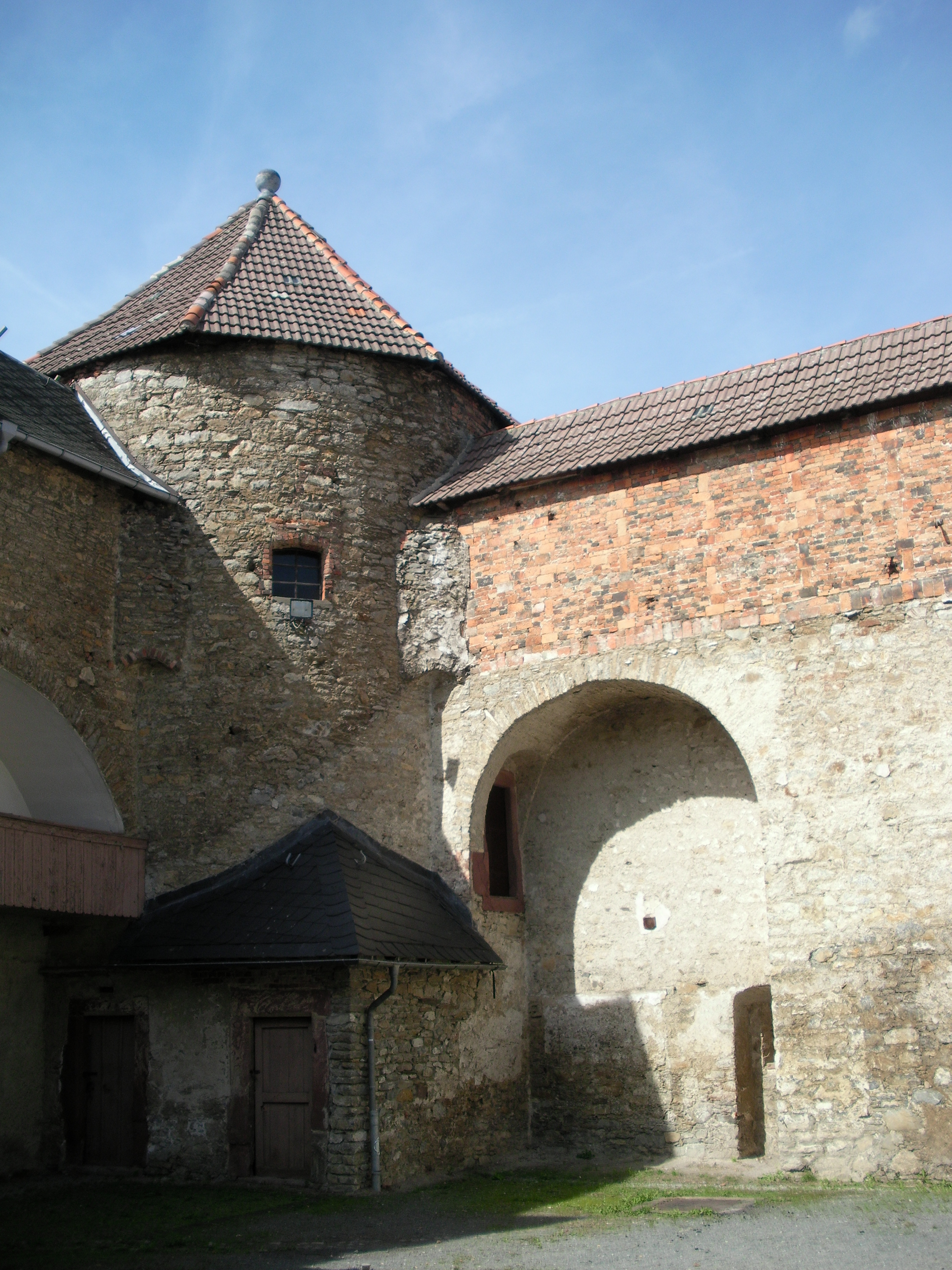
Harzgerode Castle

Prince Christian I ruled in Bernburg since he and his brothers had divided their Anhalt heritage in 1603. He turned to Calvinism and in 1608 founded the Protestant Union with the Lutheran princes, as deputy of Elector Palatine Frederick IV. In the beginning Thirty Years' War, he led the Bohemian army of Frederick's son Frederick V into the 1620 Battle of White Mountain, suffering a disastrous defeat. Temporarily banned and exiled in Sweden, he could not return to Bernburg until 1624.

Christian died in 1630; his sons, Frederick and his elder brother Christian II likewise fought in the war. Frederick served in the Swedish infantry until the Lutheran Elector John George of Saxony concluded the Peace of Prague with the Habsburg emperor Ferdinand II in 1635. Back in Anhalt, he and his brother came to terms in December and divided their father's heritage: while Christian II succeeded as Prince of Anhalt-Bernburg, Frederick received the westernmost districts (Ämter) of Harzgerode, which had just been devastated by a blaze, and Güntersberge in the Harz mountain range. Thereby, his lands comprised the Ascanian home territories in the former Saxon Schwabengau with the ruins of Anhalt Castle.

In the ongoing war, Prince Frederick served in the armed forces of Landgrave William V of Hesse-Kassel. Finally in 1641, urged by his brother, he returned to Harzgerode and married Johanna Elisabeth (1619–1647), daughter of Prince John Louis of Nassau-Hadamar the next year. Frederick made significant efforts to alleviate the impacts of the war on his tiny principality and for the reconstruction after the final Peace of Westphalia. When his cousin John Casimir of Anhalt-Dessau died in 1660, he became senior prince of all Anhalt territories.

Federick was succeeded by his only son William in 1670. He continued his father's efforts and strove for the development of the Harz silver mining (galena) areas. His two marriages with Countess Elizabeth Albertina of Solms-Laubach (1631–1693) and Sophia Augusta (1666–1733), daughter of Prince Henry of Nassau-Dillenburg remained childless. Upon his death in 1709, his Anhalt share was inherited by his cousin Prince Victor Amadeus of Anhalt-Bernburg.

== Princes of Anhalt-Harzgerode ==
- Frederick 1635–1670
- William Louis 1670–1709

To Anhalt-Bernburg

== See also ==
- House of Ascania
