= Augustus, Duke of Schleswig-Holstein-Sonderburg-Norburg-Plön =

Augustus, Duke of Schleswig-Holstein-Sonderburg-Plön-Norburg
- Born: 9 May 1635
- Died: 17 September 1699 (aged 64); Plön
- Noble family: House of Oldenburg
- Spouse: Elisabeth Charlotte of Anhalt-Harzgerode
- Father: Joachim Ernest, Duke of Schleswig-Holstein-Sonderburg-Plön
- Mother: Dorothea Augusta of Schleswig-Holstein-Gottorp

Duke Augustus of Schleswig-Holstein-Sonderburg-Plön-Norburg (9 May 1635 – 17 September 1699 in Plön) was Duke of a small part of Schleswig-Holstein around Nordborg Castle on the island of Als. He was the founder of the Schleswig-Holstein-Sonderburg-Plön-Norburg line.

== Life ==
August was the second son of Joachim Ernest and Dorothea Augusta of Schleswig-Holstein-Gottorp. Although his line was a cadet branch, his son Joachim Frederick would later inherit the Duchy of Schleswig-Holstein-Sonderburg-Plön. From 1645 to 1650, Augustus and his brother John Adolphus. who was one year older, made a Grand Tour of European countries, visiting, inter alia, England and France.

Augustus became an officer in the army of Brandenburg-Prussia and was promoted to General of the Infantry on 20 August 1664. At the same time, he was appointed governor of Magdeburg. On 21 December 1674, he was appointed governor of Minden, as a reward for his bravery in the war against the Ottoman Empire. On 7 July 1676, he received the island of Usedom as a reward for his services in the Scanian War. However, the Treaty of Saint-Germain-en-Laye of 1679 awarded Usedom to Sweden. When Elector Frederick William died in 1688, he retired from the Brandenburg army and settled at Nordborg Castle.

On 29 May 1676 he was awarded the Order of the Elephant in Copenhagen.

== Marriage and issue ==
He married Elisabeth Charlotte of Anhalt-Harzgerode (11 February 1647 – 20 January 1723), daughter of Prince Frederick of Anhalt-Bernburg-Harzgerode and his first wife, Johanna Elisabeth of Nassau-Hadamar. She was since 1665 the widow of Prince William Louis of Anhalt-Köthen. They had five children:

- Joachim Frederick (1668-1722), married:
  1. Magdalena Juliana, Countess Palatine of Birkenfeld-Gelnhausen
  2. Juliana Louise, Princess of East Frisia (1698-1721)
- Elisabeth Auguste (1669-1709), a nun in Herford Abbey
- Sophie Charlotte (1672-1720)
- Christian Charles (20 August 1674 – 23 May 1706), married:
  1. Dorothea Christina of Aichelberg (1674-1762), from 1702 Baroness of Karlstein, from 1722 Princess of Denmark
- Johanna Dorothea (December 24, 1676; † November 29, 1727), married:
  1. Prince William II of Nassau-Dillenburg (1670-1724)

== See also ==
- Schleswig-Holstein-Sonderburg
