= Joachim Frederick, Duke of Schleswig-Holstein-Sonderburg-Plön =

German duke (1668–1722)

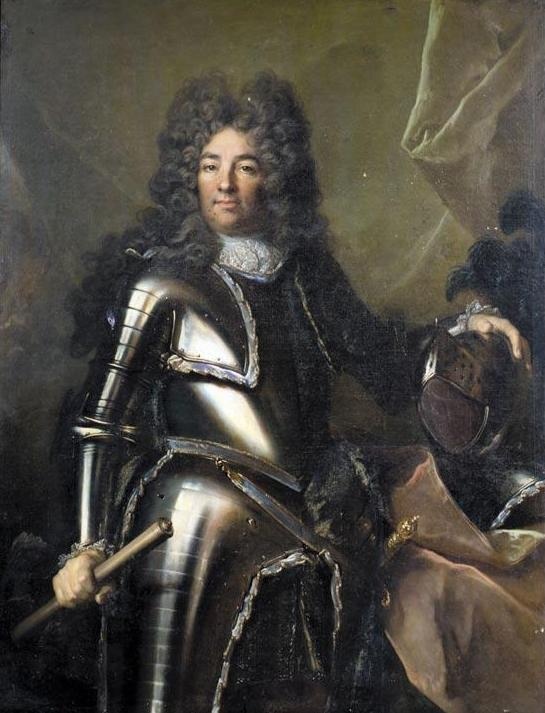
- Born: 9 May 1668; Magdeburg
- Died: 25 January 1722 (aged 53); Plön
- Noble family: House of Oldenburg
- Spouses: Magdalene Juliana of Zweibrücken-Birkenfeld; Juliana Louise of East Frisia
- Father: Augustus, Duke of Schleswig-Holstein-Sonderburg-Plön-Norburg
- Mother: Elisabeth Charlotte of Anhalt-Harzgerode

Joachim Frederick of Schleswig-Holstein-Sonderburg-Plön (9 May 1668, Magdeburg – 25 January 1722, Plön) (German: Joachim Friedrich), also known as Joachim Frederick of Schleswig-Holstein-Plön, was the third Duke of Schleswig-Holstein-Plön, a dukedom created by the division of the Duchy of Schleswig-Holstein-Sonderburg.

== Life ==
Joachim Frederick of Schleswig-Holstein-Sonderburg-Plön was born in Magdeburg on 9 May 1668. He was a scion of an insignificant branch of the Plön family, a collateral line of Schleswig-Holstein-Nordborg, with its seat at Nordborg Castle on the island of Alsen, itself formed from a division of the inheritance of Plön's first duke, Joachim Ernest in 1671. He was the eldest son of Augustus, Duke of Schleswig-Holstein-Sonderburg-Plön-Norburg (1635-1699) and his wife, Elisabeth Charlotte of Anhalt-Harzgerode (1647-1723).

When the incumbent Duke of Plön, John Adolphus, died in 1704, a few days after his son, Adolphus Augustus, was killed in a riding accident, the male Plön line could be continued only through Leopold Augustus, grandson of John Adolphus and son of Adolphus Augustus. Leopold Augustus died as a child of four in 1706, and the underlying entitlement to the inheritance of Plön passed as a result to Joachim Frederick. Joachim Frederick himself had no male heir when he died in Plön on 25 January 1722, deeply in debt. Plön Castle, the ancestral residence of the dukes of Plön, lay empty for seven years and some of its furniture was sold off; the Danish royal house administered the duchy during this period.

Seven years after the death of Duke Joachim Frederick, Frederick Charles, the son of the morganatic marriage of the late duke's brother, Christian Charles, was named the fourth Duke of Plön. He would prove to be the last.

== Family ==
Joachim Frederick was married twice. His first wife, Princess Magdalene Juliana of Zweibrücken-Birkenfeld (1686-1720), whom he married in 1704 after becoming Duke of Schleswig-Holstein-Sonderburg-Plön. She was a daughter of John Charles, Count Palatine of Gelnhausen by his first wife, Princess Sophie Amalie of Zweibrücken (1646–1695). Joachim Frederick and Magdalene Juliana had four daughters:

- Charlotte Amalia (1709-1787), who became a nun in Gandersheim Abbey
- Elizabeth Juliana (*1711)
- Dorothea Augusta Frederica (1712-1765), a nun in Gandersheim Abbey
- Christiana Louise (1713–1778)

married in 1735 Count Albert Louis Frederick of Hohenlohe-Weikersheim (1716–1744)
married in 1749 Prince Louis Frederick of Saxe-Hildburghausen.

On 17 February 1721, Joachim Frederick married his second wife, Princess Juliana Louise of Ostfriesland (1698–1740), a daughter of Christian Eberhard, Prince of East Frisia and his first wife, Princess Eberhadine Sophie of Oettingen-Oettingen (1666-1700). She miscarried their only child, a daughter, on 28 May 1722, four months after Joachim Frederick's death.

== Ancestors ==
Ancestors of Joachim Frederick, Duke of Schleswig-Holstein-Sonderburg-Plön

16. Christian III of Denmark
8. John II, Duke of Schleswig-Holstein-Sonderburg
17. Dorothea of Saxe-Lauenburg
4. Joachim Ernest, Duke of Schleswig-Holstein-Sonderburg-Plön
18. Ernest III, Duke of Brunswick-Grubenhagen
9. Elisabeth of Brunswick-Grubenhagen
19. Margaret of Pomerania-Wolgast
2. Augustus, Duke of Schleswig-Holstein-Sonderburg-Plön-Norburg
20. Adolf, Duke of Holstein-Gottorp
10. John Adolf, Duke of Holstein-Gottorp
21. Christine of Hesse
5. Dorothea Augusta of Schleswig-Holstein-Gottorp
22. Frederick II of Denmark
11. Augusta of Denmark
23. Sophie of Mecklenburg-Güstrow
1. Joachim Frederick, Duke of Schleswig-Holstein-Sonderburg-Plön
24. Joachim Ernest, Prince of Anhalt
12. Christian I, Prince of Anhalt-Bernburg
25. Agnes of Barby-Mühlingen
6. Frederick, Prince of Anhalt-Harzgerode
26. Arnold III, Count of Bentheim-Steinfurt-Tecklenburg-Limburg
13. Anna of Bentheim-Tecklenburg
27. Magdalena of Neuenahr-Alpen
3. Elisabeth Charlotte of Anhalt-Harzgerode
28. John VI, Count of Nassau-Dillenburg
14. John Louis, Prince of Nassau-Hadamar
29. Johannetta of Sayn-Wittgenstein
7. Johanna Elisabeth of Nassau-Hadamar
30. Simon VI, Count of Lippe
15. Ursula of Lippe
31. Elisabeth of Holstein-Pinneberg and Schaumburg

== See also ==
- Schleswig-Holstein-Sonderburg

Joachim Frederick, Duke of Schleswig-Holstein-Sonderburg-Plön House of Oldenburg Born: 9 May 1668 Died: 25 January 1722
German nobility
| Preceded by Leopold Augustus | Duke of Schleswig-Holstein-Sonderburg-Plön; 1706–1722 | Succeeded by Frederick Charles |
