= Siege of Huy (1694) =

- Part of the Nine Years' War
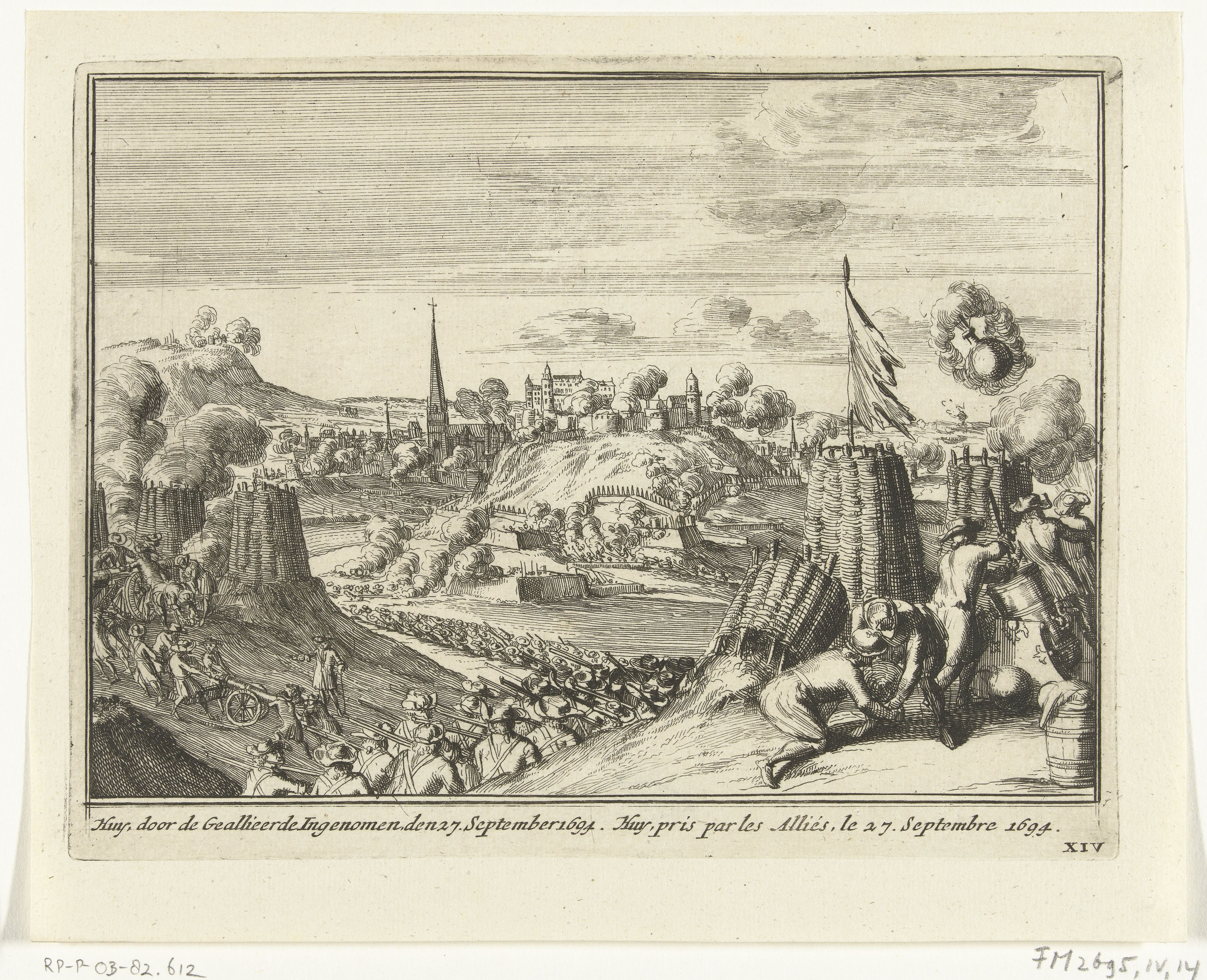
- Siege and capture of Huy by allied forces, 27 September 1694.
Date	22–27 September 1694
Location	Huy, Prince-Bishopric of Liège (present-day Belgium) 50°31′N 05°14′E
Result	Grand Alliance victory

Belligerents
Kingdom of France	Grand Alliance; Dutch Republic; Kingdom of England; Kingdom of Scotland; Spanish Empire; Holy Roman Empire

Commanders and leaders
(Kingdom of France) Duke of Boufflers	(Dutch Republic) Duke of Holstein Plön; (Dutch Republic) Menno van Coehoorn

Strength
1,200	84,000-strong field army, unknown how many were present at the siege

Casualties and losses
300 dead	Unknown

The 1694 siege of Huy or second siege of Huy took place during the Nine Years' War, between 22 September and 27 September 1694. The campaign of 1694 started rather late in the year. The French limited themselves to defending what they already had and William III first wanted to await the outcome of the expedition to Brest. The Anglo-Dutch amphibious assault was a failure; 2000 of the 7000 allies died in the assault. At the same time William III was gathering the Anglo-Dutch army at Leuven. At the end of July he reviewed the troops there and they were in excellent condition. The Anglo-Dutch army was reinforced by 6,000 Bavarian troops in the pay of Spain and numbered 84,000 men in total. The allies possessed the numerical advantage so the French remained on the defensive. When this became clear to William III he sent the Duke of Holstein Plön and Menno van Coehoorn with an army to take the city of Huy. Five days later on 27 September, the French garrison surrendered. The 780 remaining defenders of the original 1200 were allowed to march out with the honours of war. William III felt that enough had been achieved this year: He had captured Diksmuide earlier that year and due to the capture of Huy the allies did not have to keep as many troops on garrison duty in Liége, and the Meuse was again in allied hands up to Namur. It also allowed him to plan for the siege of Namur the next year.

== General and cited references ==
- Van Nimwegen, Olaf (2020). De Veertigjarige Oorlog 1672-1712: De strijd van de Nederlanders tegen de Zonnekoning. Prometheus. ISBN 978-90-446-3871-4.
- Van Alphen, Marc; Hoffenaar, Jan; Lemmers, Alan; Van der Spek, Christiaan (2019). Krijgsmacht en Handelsgeest: Om het machtsevenwicht in Europa. Boom. ISBN 978-90-244-3038-3.
