= Louise Albertine of Schleswig-Holstein-Sonderburg-Plön =

Danish and German princess

Louise Albertine
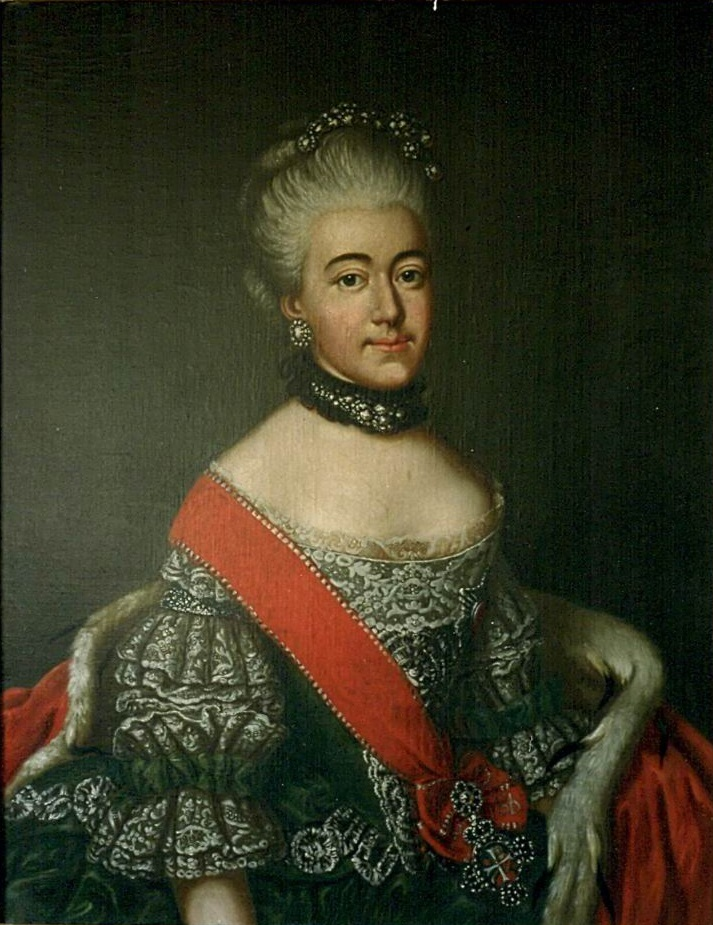

Princess Consort of Anhalt-Bernburg
- Reign: 18 May 1765 – 2 March 1769
- Born: 21 July 1748; Plön, Schleswig-Holstein-Sonderburg-Plön
- Died: 2 March 1769 (aged 20); Ballenstedt, Anhalt, Holy Roman Empire
- Spouse: Frederick Albert, Prince of Anhalt-Bernburg (m. 1763)
- Issue: Alexius Frederick Christian, Duke of Anhalt-Bernburg; Princess Pauline of Anhalt-Bernburg
- House: Oldenburg (by birth); Ascania (by marriage)
- Father: Frederick Charles, Duke of Schleswig-Holstein-Sonderburg-Plön
- Mother: Christine Armgard von Reventlow

Louise Albertine, Princess of Anhalt-Bernburg (née Princess Louise Albertine of Schleswig-Holstein-Sonderburg-Plön; 21 July 1748 – 2 March 1769) was a member of the Danish royal family and the consort of Frederick Albert, Prince of Anhalt-Bernburg.

== Biography ==
Princess Louise Albertine of Schleswig-Holstein-Sonderburg-Plön was born in Plön on 21 July 1748 to Frederick Charles, Duke of Schleswig-Holstein-Sonderburg-Plön, a member of a cadet branch of the Danish royal family, and his wife, Countess Christine Armgard von Reventlow (1711-1779). Her mother was the daughter of Christian Detlev, Count of Reventlow and a niece of Queen Anne Sophie of Denmark and Norway.

In 1763 Louise Albertine married Prince Frederick Albert of Anhalt-Bernburg. They had two children:

- Alexius Frederick Christian, Duke of Anhalt-Bernburg (1767-1834)
- Princess Pauline of Anhalt-Bernburg (1769-1820)

In 1765 her husband succeeded his father, Victor Frederick, Prince of Anhalt-Bernburg, as the Prince of Anhalt-Bernburg.

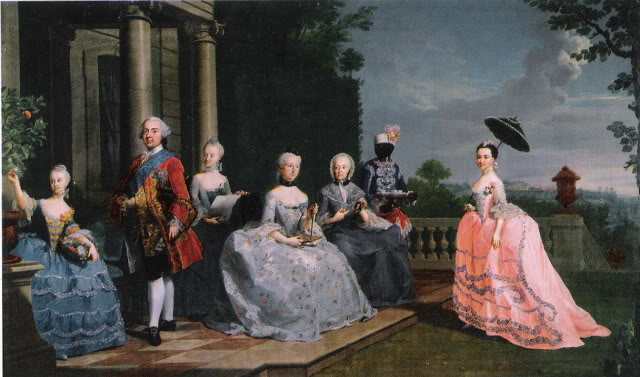
Painting by Johann Heinrich Tischbein (1759), from left to right: Princess Louise Albertine, Duke Frederick Charles, Princess Friederike Sophie, Duchess Christine Armgard, Dorothea Christina, an African servant, and Princess Charlotte Amalie Wilhelmine at Traventhal House

She died of measles a week after giving birth to her daughter, on 2 March 1769 in Ballenstedt. She is buried in the crypt of the Castle Church of St. Aegidien in Bernburg.
