= St. John's Church, Plön =

Coordinates: 54°9′27″N 10°24′43″E

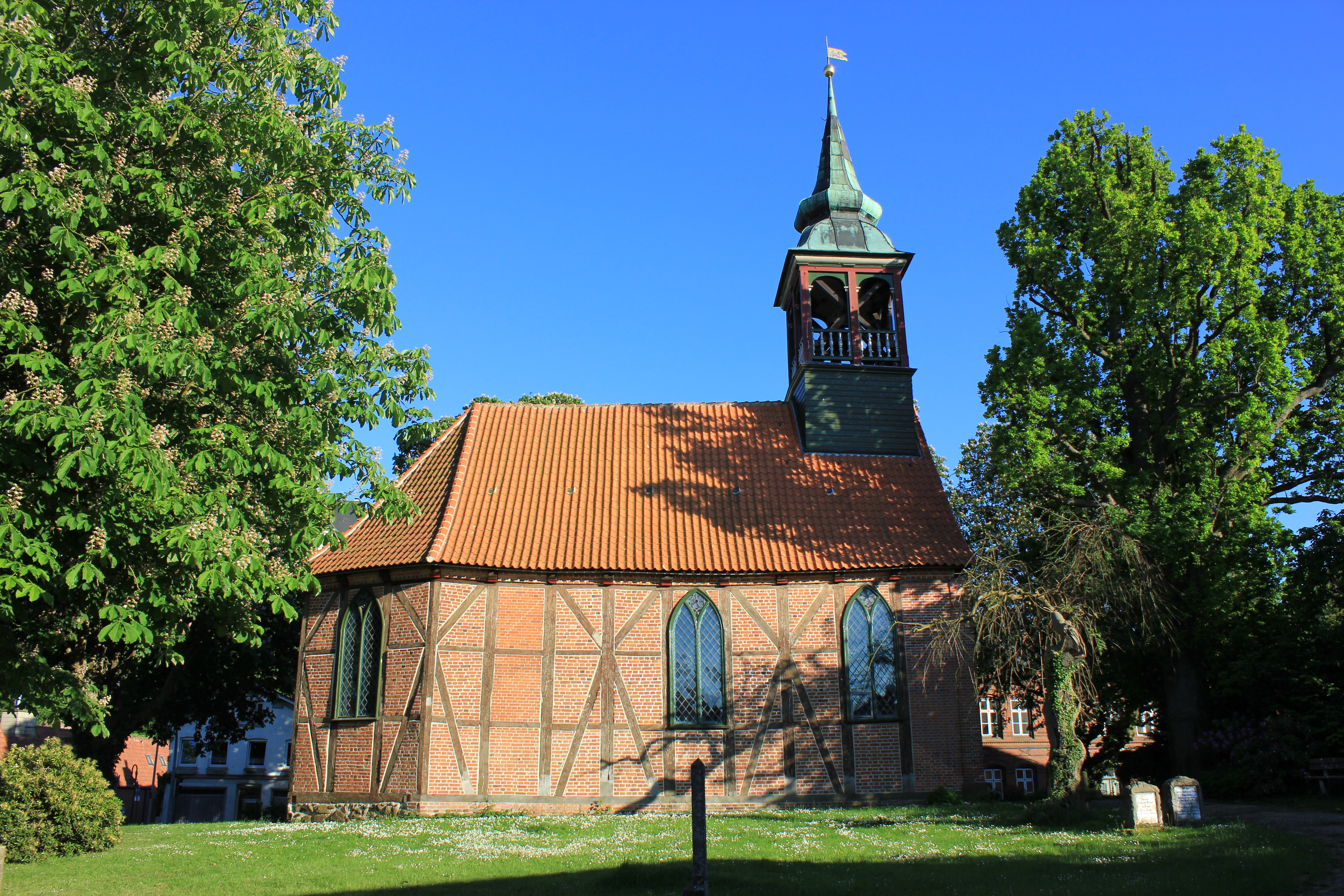
St. John's Church Plön

St. John's Church (German: Johanniskirche) in the north German town of Plön was built in 1685 as an independent parish church when Plön's new town, Neustadt, was developed by Duke John Adolphus.

The timber-framed hall church (Saalkirche), with its three-sided polygonal end, was altered in 1861 by the installation of new windows. Further changes were made in 1910, when the interior was changed to the style of Gothic Revival.
