= William Louis, Prince of Anhalt-Harzgerode =

German prince (1643–1709)

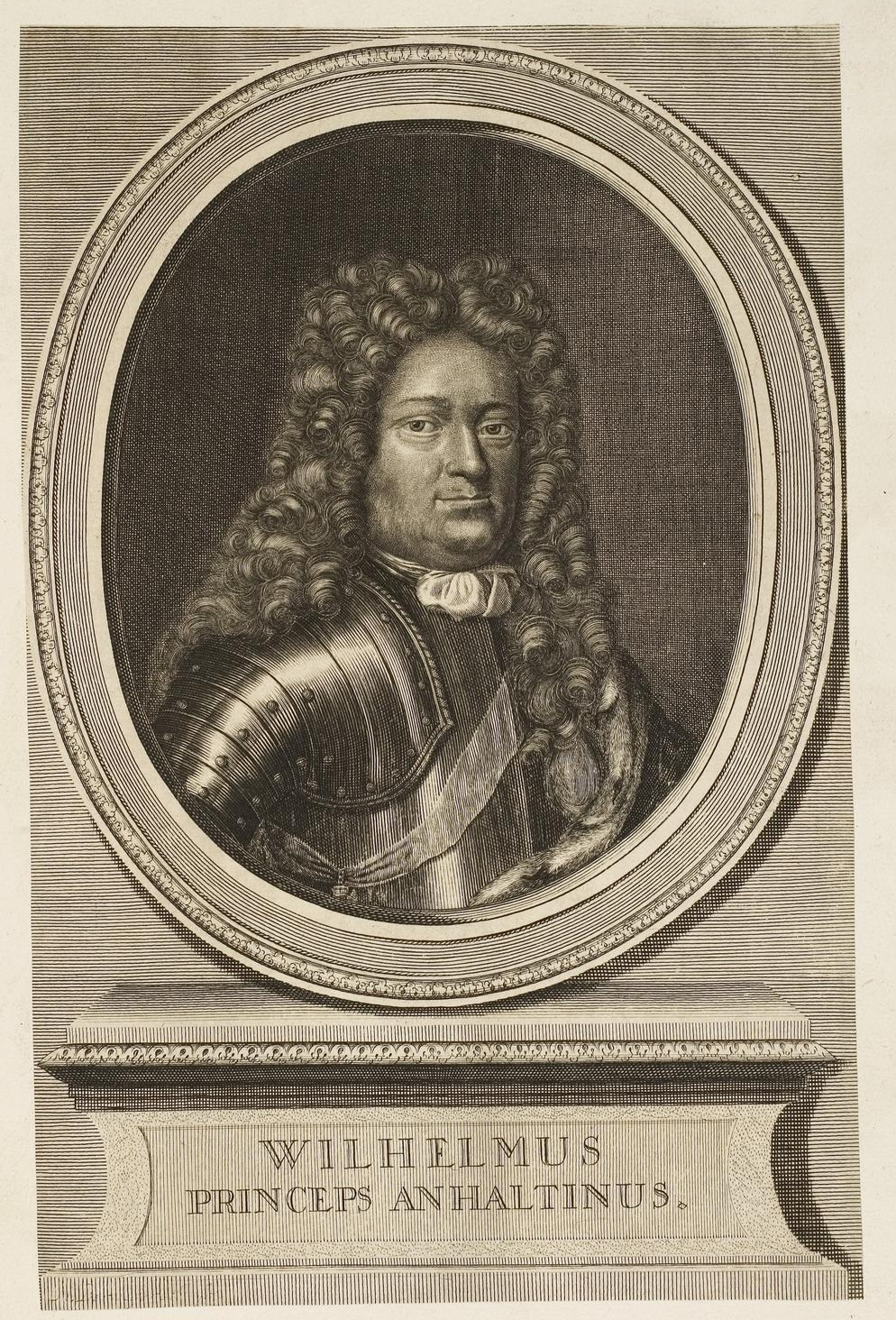
William of Anhalt-Harzgerode

William Louis of Anhalt-Harzgerode (Harzgerode, 18 August 1643 – Harzgerode, 14 October 1709) was a German prince of the House of Ascania and the last ruler of the principality of Anhalt-Harzgerode.

He was the eldest child and only son of Frederick, Prince of Anhalt-Harzgerode, by his first wife Johanna Elisabeth, daughter of John Louis, Prince of Nassau-Hadamar.

== Life ==
William Louis succeeded his father in Harzgerode when he died in 1670. From 1660 until 1668, he was the second in line to the principality of Anhalt-Bernburg, until the birth of the first son of his cousin, Prince Victor Amadeus.

== Marriages ==
In Laubach on 25 July 1671, William Louis married Elisabeth Juliane (b. Kassel, 6 March 1631 – d. Harzgerode, 2 January 1693), daughter of Albert Otto II, Count of Solms-Laubach. She was fourteen years his senior, and perhaps for this reason the union was childless.

In Frederiksborg near Copenhagen on 20 October 1695 William Louis married for a second time to Sophie Auguste (b. Dillenburg, 28 April 1666 – d. Usingen, 14 January 1733), daughter of Henry, Prince of Nassau-Dillenburg. This union was also childless, in spite the fact that Sophie Auguste was twenty-three years younger than William Louis.

Without any issue from his marriage, Anhalt-Harzgerode was merged back to the main line of Anhalt-Bernburg on his death, ruled at that time by his cousin Victor Amadeus.

William Louis, Prince of Anhalt-Harzgerode House of Ascania Born: 18 August 1643 Died: 14 October 1709
Preceded by Frederick	Prince of Anhalt-Harzgerode; 1670–1709	Succeeded by Anhalt-Harzgerode merged into the principality of Anhalt-Bernburg under Victor Amadeus
