= Duke Bernhard of Schleswig-Holstein-Sonderburg-Plön =

- Born: 31 January 1639
- Died: 13 January 1676 (aged 36); Plön
- Noble family: House of Oldenburg
- Father: Joachim Ernest, Duke of Schleswig-Holstein-Sonderburg-Plön
- Mother: Dorothea Augusta of Gottorp

Bernard of Schleswig-Holstein-Sonderburg-Plön (31 January 1639 – 13 January 1676 in Plön) was a Danish general.

He was the fourth son of Joachim Ernest, the reigning duke of Holstein-Plön, and his wife Dorothea Augusta of Gottorp. Joachim Ernest had his son trained militarily and Bernhard became a colonel in the Spanish service at first.

In 1672, he was the commander of the Brunswick-Lüneburg infantry defending, with imperial troops, the city of Groningen against the advancing French troops and troops of Prince-Bishop Christoph Bernhard von Galen of Münster. In August 1675 he returned to Plön, where he took command of the troops there. Denmark was preparing the Pomeranian campaign of 1675, and on 25 October 1675, he was appointed Major General in the Danish army.

He died of a sudden fever in 1676 in Plön. He was succeeded as commander of the Danish troops by his older brother John Adolphus.

He was not married.
