= Dorothea Augusta of Schleswig-Holstein-Gottorp =

- Duchess of Schleswig-Holstein-Sonderburg-Plön
- Tenure: 1633–1671
- Born: 12 May 1602
- Died: 13 March 1682 (aged 79)
- Spouse: Joachim Ernest, Duke of Schleswig-Holstein-Sonderburg-Plön
- Issue: John Adolphus, Duke of Schleswig-Holstein-Sonderburg-Plön; Augustus, Duke of Schleswig-Holstein-Sonderburg-Plön-Norburg; Duchess Ernestine; Joachim Ernest II, Duke of Schleswig-Holstein-Sonderburg-Plön-Rethwisch; Duke Bernhard of Schleswig-Holstein-Sonderburg-Plön; Agnes Hedwig, Duchess of Schleswig-Holstein-Sonderburg-Glücksburg; Duke Charles Henry; Sophia Eleonora, Countess of Hohenlohe-Neuenstein
- House: House of Holstein-Gottorp
- Father: John Adolf, Duke of Holstein-Gottorp
- Mother: Augusta of Denmark

Dorothea Augusta of Schleswig-Holstein-Gottorp (12 May 1602 – 13 March 1682) was a German noblewoman from the House of (Schleswig-)Holstein-Gottorp, a cadet branch of the House of Oldenburg. She became the first Duchess of Schleswig-Holstein-Sonderburg-Plön as the wife of Duke Joachim Ernest (1595–1671).

== Life ==
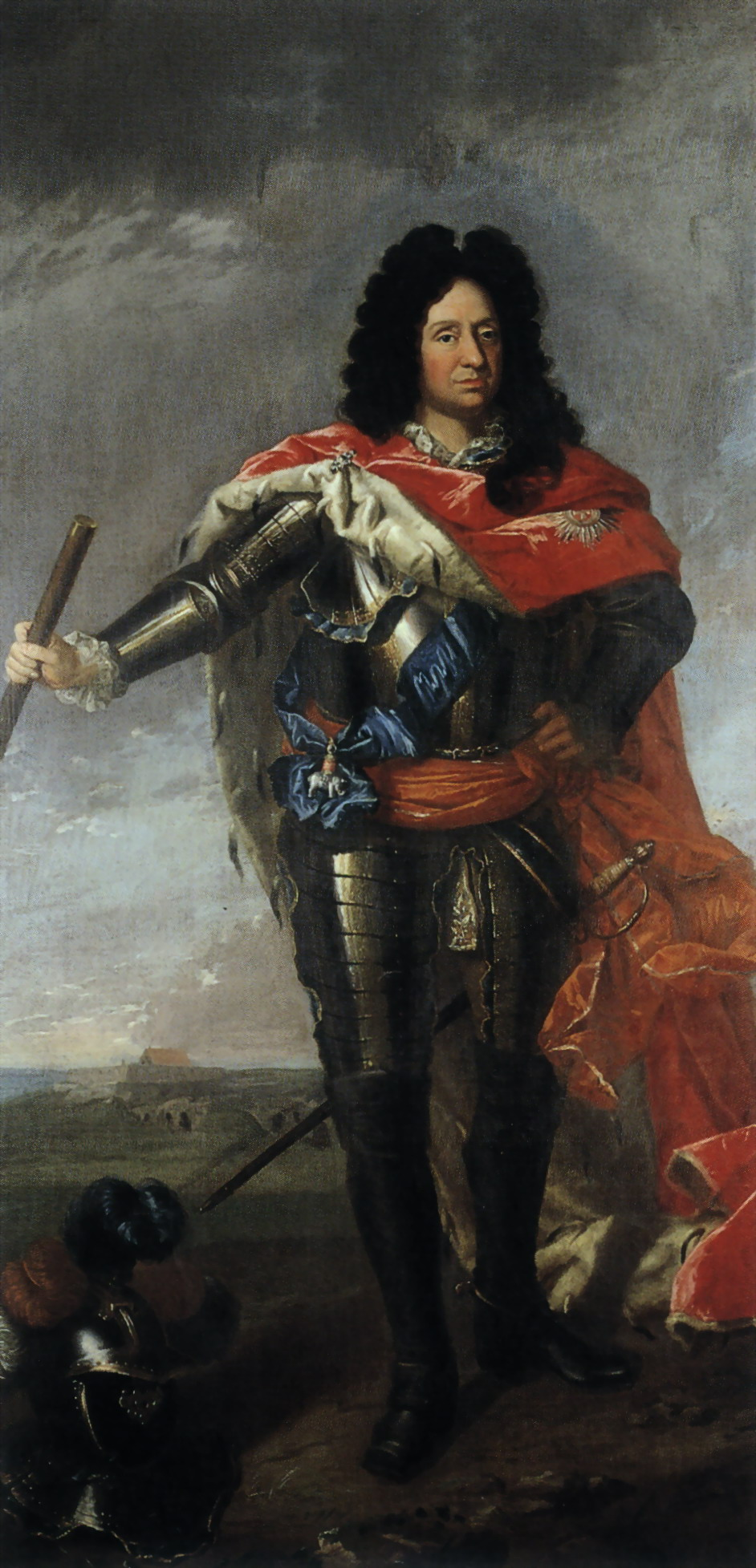
John Adolphus, Duke of Schleswig-Holstein-Sonderburg-Plön, Dorothea Augusta's eldest son in around 1750

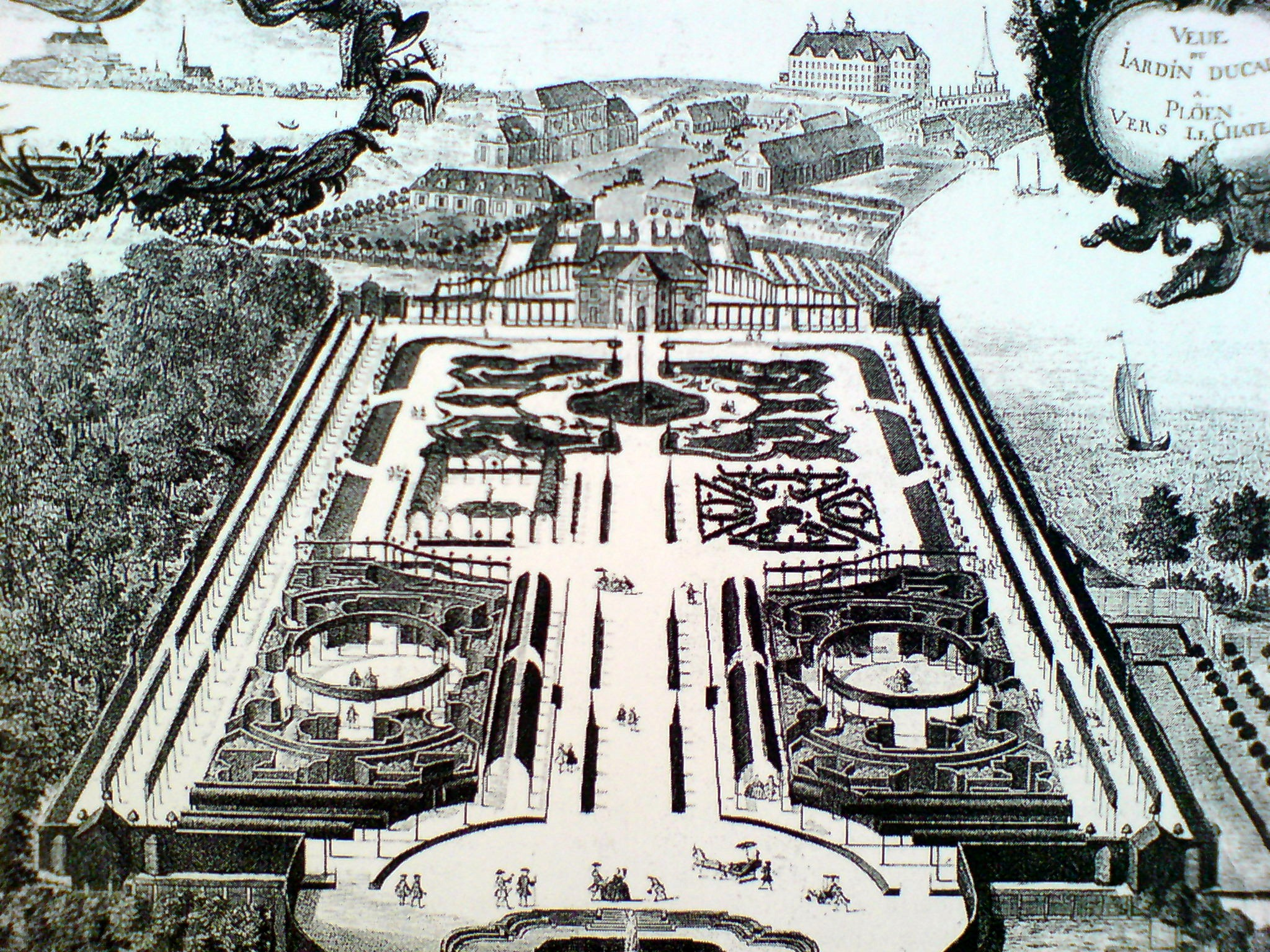
The gardens of Plön Castle with the castle in the background in 1749

Dorothea Augusta was born on 12 May 1602 as the fourth child and second daughter of John Adolf, Duke of Holstein-Gottorp and his wife, Princess Augusta of Denmark. She had seven siblings, including three sisters, six of whom survived infancy.

In 1633, she married Joachim Ernest, Duke of Schleswig-Holstein-Sonderburg-Plön. On the occasion of their marriage, Joachim Ernest built a new residence and seat of government, Plön Castle, in the seat of his duchy, the town of Plön, which was completed in 1636. The couple ruled over only a small territory, as Joachim Ernest and his four brothers had divided the duchy of their father among themselves, resulting in five small ones. Their estate included Plön, Ahrensbök and Reinfeld.

== Issue ==
Dorothea Augusta had eight children with her husband, seven of whom survived childhood:

- Duke John Adolphus of Schleswig-Holstein-Sonderburg-Plön (8 April 1634 – 2 July 1704), who became Duke of Schleswig-Holstein-Sonderburg-Plön, married Dorothea of Brunswick-Wolfenbüttel and had issue
- Duke Augustus of Schleswig-Holstein-Sonderburg-Plön (9 May 1635 – 17 September 1699), who became Duke of Schleswig-Holstein-Sonderburg-Plön-Norburg, married Princess Elisabeth Charlotte of Anhalt-Harzgerode (1647–1723) and had issue
- Duchess Ernestine of Schleswig-Holstein-Sonderburg-Plön (10 October 1636 – 18 March 1696)
- Duke Joachim Ernest II of Schleswig-Holstein-Sonderburg-Plön (5 October 1637 – 5 October 1700), who became Duke of Schleswig-Holstein-Sonderburg-Plön-Rethwisch, who married Isabella of Merode-Westerloo (c. 1649 – 5 January 1701)
- Duke Bernard of Schleswig-Holstein-Sonderburg-Plön (31 January 1639 – 13 January 1676), Danish general
- Duchess Agnes Hedwig of Schleswig-Holstein-Sonderburg-Plön (29 September 1640 – 20 November 1698), who married Christian, Duke of Schleswig-Holstein-Sonderburg-Glücksburg and had issue
- Duke Charles Henry of Schleswig-Holstein-Sonderburg-Plön (20 March 1642 – 20 January 1655), who died at the age of 12
- Duchess Sophia Eleonora of Schleswig-Holstein-Sonderburg-Plön (30 July 1644 – 22 January 1689), who married Wolfgang Julius, Count of Hohenlohe-Neuenstein and had no issue

== Ancestry ==
Ancestors of Dorothea Augusta of Schleswig-Holstein-Gottorp

8. Frederick I of Denmark
4. Adolf, Duke of Holstein-Gottorp
9. Sophie of Pomerania
2. John Adolf, Duke of Holstein-Gottorp
10. Philip I, Landgrave of Hesse
5. Christine of Hesse
11. Christine of Saxony
1. Dorothea Augusta of Schleswig-Holstein-Gottorp
12. Christian III of Denmark
6. Frederick II of Denmark
13. Dorothea of Saxe-Lauenburg
3. Augusta of Denmark
14. Ulrich III, Duke of Mecklenburg
7. Sophie of Mecklenburg-Güstrow
15. Elizabeth of Denmark
