= Princess Charlotte Amalie Wilhelmine of Schleswig-Holstein-Sonderburg-Plön =

Charlotte Amalie Wilhelmine of Schleswig-Holstein-Sonderburg-Plön
- Princess of (Schleswig-)Holstein-Sonderburg-Augustenburg
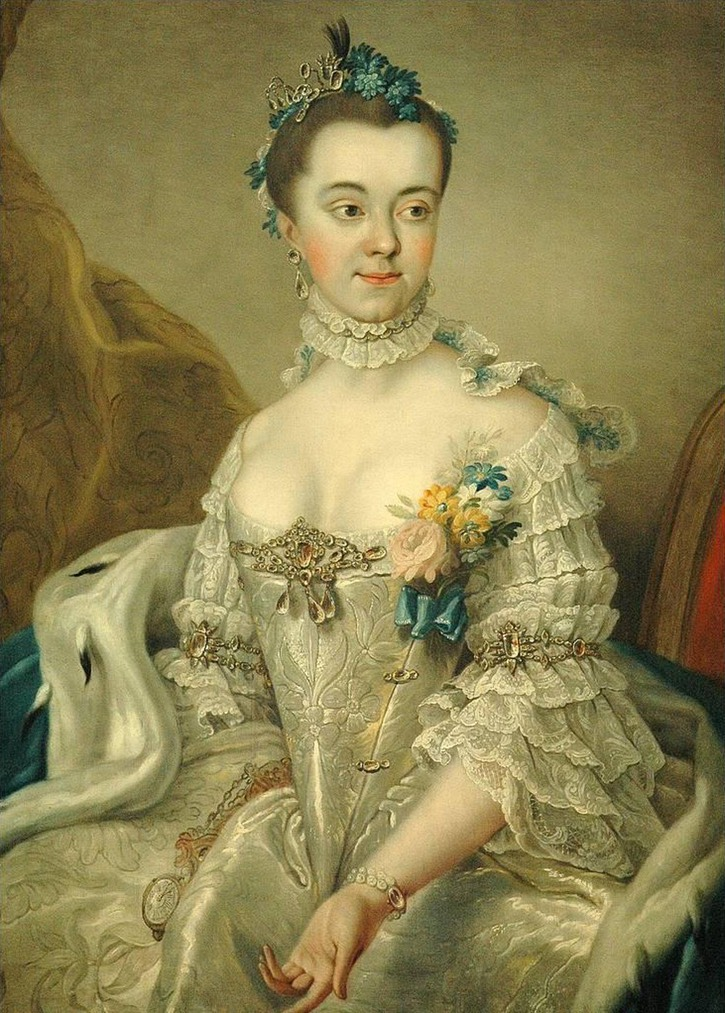
- Portrait by Stefano Torelli, c. 1762

Duchess of Schleswig-Holstein-Sonderburg-Augustenburg
- Tenure: 26 May 1762–11 October 1770
- Born: 23 April 1744; Plön, Germany
- Died: 11 October 1770 (aged 26); Augustenborg, Denmark
- Spouse: Frederick Christian I, Duke of Schleswig-Holstein-Sonderburg-Augustenburg
- Issue among others...: Frederick Christian II; Charles August, Crown Prince of Sweden
- House: House of Oldenburg
- Father: Frederick Charles, Duke of Schleswig-Holstein-Sonderburg-Plön
- Mother: Countess Christiane Armgard von Reventlow

Charlotte Amalie Wilhelmine of (Schleswig-)Holstein-Plön (Charlotte Amalie Vilhelmine af Slesvig-Holsten-Pløn in Danish) (23 April 1744 – 11 October 1770), was a princess of the Duchy of Schleswig-Holstein-Sonderburg-Plön (or Holstein-Plön), a cadet branch of the Danish royal family. She was born at Plön to Frederick Charles, Duke of Schleswig-Holstein-Sonderburg-Plön and Countess Christiane Armgard von Reventlow, the fourth of five children.

== Life ==
As her only brother died an infant in 1740 the small, partitioned-off Danish duchy of Plön was destined to revert to the royal domain of the King of Denmark on their father's death. Thus her parents were freed from the custom of stinting their daughters' dowries to maximize the patrimony of a male heir. Consequently, and unusually only one of the four sisters was enrolled in a nunnery: the eldest, Sophie, became canoness in 1753, and a year later deaconess of Quedlinburg Abbey, while the other three princesses were all allowed to marry. Charlotte Amalie was the first of her sisters to wed, marrying at Reinfeld on 26 May 1762 her cousin, Frederick Christian I, Duke of Schleswig-Holstein-Sonderburg-Augustenburg. Two years later, as a near, agnatic kinsman of his father-in-law, Frederick Christian renounced any claim he might have had to the Plön duchy and in return received from the Danish crown the castle of Sonderburg, the domain of Gammelgaard with Gundestrup and the fiefs of Ronhave, Langenvorwerk, Kekinisgaard and Maibullgaard, all located on the isle of Ahlsen or nearby on that of Sundeved in the Sonderburg region.

They had seven children:

- Louise Christine Caroline (16 February 1763 – 27 January 1764).
- Louise Christine Caroline (17 February 1764 – 2 August 1815).
- Frederick Christian II (28 September 1765 – 14 June 1814), married Princess Louise Auguste of Denmark.
- Frederick Charles Emil (8 March 1767 – 14 June 1841), Danish general, married in Leipzig 29 September 1801 without the consent or recognition of either the Duke or the King, Sofie Eleonora Fredericka von Scheel (1776–1836), daughter of Jürgen Eric von Scheel and Anna Drothea von Ahlefeldt.
- Christian August (9 July 1768 – 28 May 1810), Danish general, and later selected Crown Prince of Sweden as Karl August, however, he died before inheriting the throne.
- Sophie Amelie (10 August 1769 – 6 October 1769).
- Charles William (4 October 1770 – 22 February 1771).

The couple spent some of her wealth to build the new Augustenburg Palace.

Charlotte Amalie died in Augustenburg aged 26, seven days after the birth of her last child.
