= Frederick, Prince of Anhalt-Harzgerode =

German prince

Frederick of Anhalt-Harzgerode
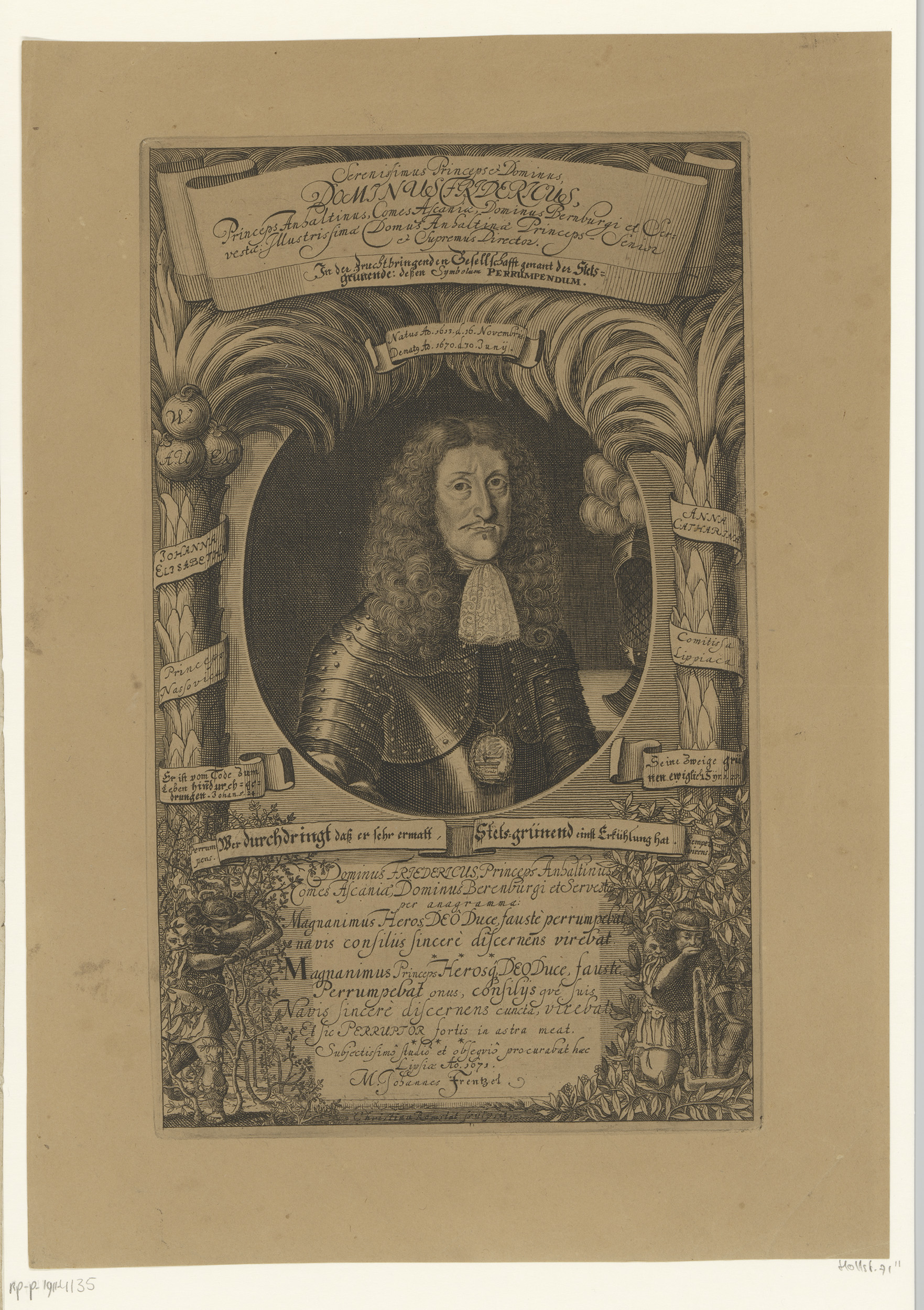
- Born: 16 November 1613; Ensdorf, Bavaria
- Died: 30 June 1670 (aged 56); Plötzkau
- Spouse: Johanna Elisabeth of Nassau-Hadamar; Anna Katharina of Lippe-Detmold
- House: House of Ascania
- Father: Christian I, Prince of Anhalt-Bernburg
- Mother: Anna of Bentheim-Tecklenburg

Frederick of Anhalt-Harzgerode (16 November 1613, Ensdorf, Bavaria – 30 June 1670, Plötzkau), was a German prince of the House of Ascania and the first ruler of the principality of Anhalt-Harzgerode.

He was the fourth (but third surviving son) of Christian I, Prince of Anhalt-Bernburg, by his wife Anna of Bentheim-Tecklenburg, daughter of Arnold III, Count of Bentheim-Steinfurt-Tecklenburg-Limburg. In fact, he was the youngest son of his parents who survived into adulthood: his younger brother, Frederick Louis, born in 1619, died in infancy.

== Life ==
After the death of his father in 1630, Frederick and his brother Ernest were excluded from the government of Anhalt-Bernburg by their older brother Christian II. Ernest died two years later, unmarried and childless.

Only in 1635 Christian II concluded a treaty to divide the principality with Frederick, then his only surviving brother, who received Harzgerode.

Frederick ruled his small principality without complications for almost thirty years, until 1665, when the extinction of the line of Anhalt-Plötzkau changed the original division of the Anhalt principalities. Plötzkau returned to Anhalt-Bernburg, from which it was originally extracted in order to create a new principality; Christian II granted this land to Frederick, who moved there until his death, five years later.

From 1660 until 1668, Frederick was heir presumptive to the principality of Anhalt-Bernburg, preceded only by his nephew Victor Amadeus.

== Marriages and Issue ==
In Bückeburg on 10 August 1642 Frederick married Johanna Elisabeth (b. Dillenburg, 7 January 1619 – d. Harzgerode, 2 March 1647), daughter of John Louis, Prince of Nassau-Hadamar. They had three children:

1. William Louis, Prince of Anhalt-Harzgerode (b. Harzgerode, 18 August 1643 – d. Harzgerode, 14 October 1709).
2. Anna Ursula (b. Harzgerode, 24 June 1645 – d. Harzgerode, 25 February 1647).
3. Elisabeth Charlotte (b. Harzgerode, 11 February 1647 – d. Osterholm, 20 January 1723), married on 25 August 1663 to William Louis, Prince of Anhalt-Köthen, then for a second time on 6 October 1666 to Augustus, Duke of Schleswig-Holstein-Sonderburg-Plön-Norburg.

In Harzgerode on 26 May 1657 Frederick married for a second time to Anna Katharina (b. Brake, 31 July 1612 – d. Harzgerode, 15 October 1659), daughter of Simon VII, Count of Lippe-Detmold. This union was childless.

Frederick, Prince of Anhalt-Harzgerode House of Ascania Born: 16 November 1613 Died: 30 June 1670
Preceded by Christian I	Prince of Anhalt-Harzgerode; 1635–1670	Succeeded by William Louis
