= John Adolphus, Duke of Schleswig-Holstein-Sonderburg-Plön =

Duke from the House of Oldenburg

John Adolphus
- Duke of Schleswig-Holstein-Sonderburg-Plön
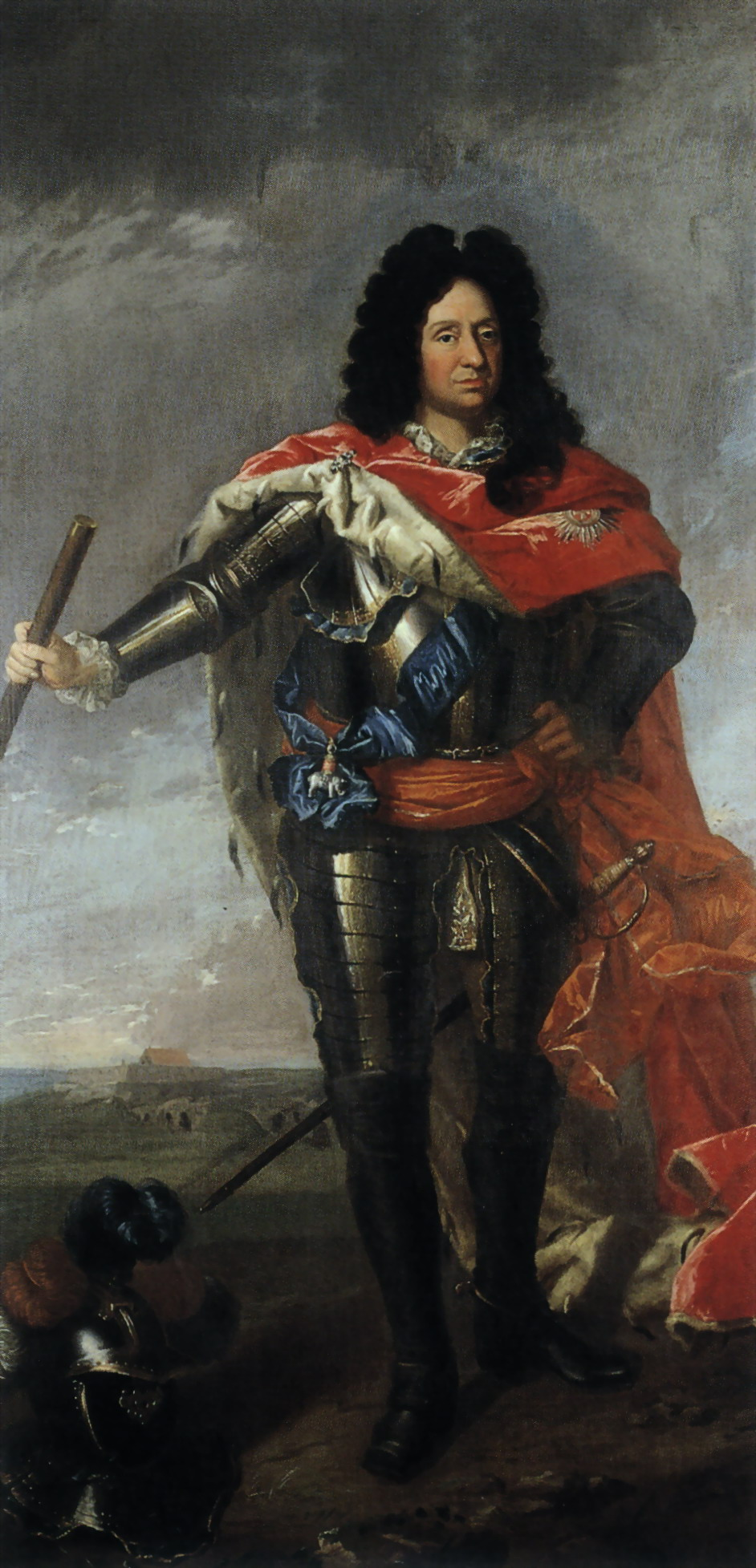
- Portrait by Johann Valentin Tischbein
- Born: 8 April 1634; Ahrensbök
- Died: 2 July 1704 (aged 70); Ruhleben
- Noble family: Oldenburg
- Spouse: Dorothea of Brunswick-Wolfenbüttel
- Father: Joachim Ernest, Duke of Schleswig-Holstein-Sonderburg-Plön
- Mother: Dorothea Augusta of Schleswig-Holstein-Gottorp

Military service
- Battles/wars: Franco-Dutch War; Battle of Seneffe; Nine Years' War; Siege of Huy; War of the Spanish Succession; Battle of Smolenice

John Adolphus of Schleswig-Holstein-Sonderburg-Plön (German: Johann Adolf or Hans Adolf; 8 April 1634, Ahrensbök – 2 July 1704 Ruhleben) was the second Duke of Schleswig-Holstein-Sonderburg-Plön, which had been created by a division of the Duchy of Schleswig-Holstein-Sonderburg.

== Life ==
He was born on 8 April 1634 in Ahrensbök, the eldest son of the first Duke of Plön, Joachim Ernest and Dorothea Augusta of Schleswig-Holstein-Gottorp.

From 1645 to 1650 he went on a grand tour around the countries of Europe, including England and France. He was accompanied by his brother, Augustus, who was one year younger. In 1671 he inherited the dukedom from his father. On 25 October 1671 he was bestowed with the Order of the Elephant, the highest Danish order of knighthood, becoming the 124th member of the order.

In 1684 he had the first hunting lodge built in Traventhal; this was followed in 1685 by St. John's Church, Plön and in 1690 the parish church of Plön. In 1694 he led the Dutch army at the Siege of Huy. John Adolphus took part in several of the major wars of his time, including the Ottoman wars and handed over the running of his duchy during those times largely to his mother and his wife. During his reign the Treaty of Traventhal was signed at the ducal hunting lodge in Traventhal, a milestone during the Great Northern War.

In 1704 went to Hungary and fought against the Kurucs with the forces of Holstein-Plön and Denmark. He participated in the battle of Smolenice.

== Family ==
John Adolphus married Dorothea of Brunswick-Wolfenbüttel, a daughter of Rudolf Augustus of Brunswick-Wolfenbüttel. They had two children:

- Adolphus Augustus (born 29 March 1680; died 29 June 1704), married Elisabeth Sophia of Schleswig-Holstein-Sonderburg-Nordborg (1683–1767). She was the daughter of Rudolf of Schleswig-Holstein-Sonderburg-Norburg, and granddaughter of Frederick, Duke of Schleswig-Holstein-Sonderburg-Norburg.

- their son, Leopold Augustus (1702-1706), died as a child

- Dorothea Sophia (1692–1765), married Adolphus Frederick III, Duke of Mecklenburg

Duke John Adolphus died on 2 July 1704 in Ruhleben, a few days after his son, Adolphus Augustus, had been killed in a riding accident. Because Leopold Augustus, son of Adolphus Augustus and grandson of John Adolphus died in childhood in 1706, the estate went to John Adolphus' nephew, Joachim Frederick, from the line of Schleswig-Holstein-Nordborg.

== Ancestors ==
Ancestors of John Adolphus, Duke of Schleswig-Holstein-Sonderburg-Plön

16. Frederick I of Denmark (=24)
8. Christian III of Denmark (=28)
17. Anna of Brandenburg
4. John II, Duke of Schleswig-Holstein-Sonderburg
18. Magnus I, Duke of Saxe-Lauenburg
9. Dorothea of Saxe-Lauenburg (=29)
19. Catherine of Brunswick-Wolfenbüttel
2. Joachim Ernest, Duke of Schleswig-Holstein-Sonderburg-Plön
20. John V, Prince of Anhalt-Zerbst
10. Joachim Ernest, Prince of Anhalt
21. Margaret of Brandenburg
5. Agnes Hedwig of Anhalt
22. Christoph, Duke of Württemberg
11. Eleonore of Württemberg
23. Anna Maria of Brandenburg-Ansbach
1. John Adolphus, Duke of Schleswig-Holstein-Sonderburg-Plön
24. Frederick I of Denmark (=16)
12. Adolf, Duke of Holstein-Gottorp
25. Sophie of Pomerania
6. John Adolf, Duke of Holstein-Gottorp
26. Philip I, Landgrave of Hesse
13. Christine of Hesse
27. Christine of Saxony
3. Dorothea Augusta of Schleswig-Holstein-Gottorp
28. Christian III of Denmark (=8)
14. Frederick II of Denmark
29. Dorothea of Saxe-Lauenburg (=9)
7. Augusta of Denmark
30. Ulrich, Duke of Mecklenburg
15. Sophie of Mecklenburg-Güstrow
31. Elizabeth of Denmark

== Sources ==
- Karl Sommeregger (1905). "Johann Adolph, Herzog zu Schleswig-Holstein-Plön" . Allgemeine Deutsche Biographie (in German). Vol. 50. Leipzig: Duncker & Humblot. pp. 684–686.

John Adolphus, Duke of Schleswig-Holstein-Sonderburg-Plön House of Oldenburg Born: 8 April 1634 Died: 2 July 1704
German nobility
| Preceded by Joachim Ernest | Duke of Schleswig-Holstein-Sonderburg-Plön; 1671–1704 | Succeeded by Leopold Augustus |
