= Princess Elisabeth Charlotte of Anhalt-Harzgerode =

Elisabeth Charlotte of Anhalt-Harzgerode
- Born: 11 February 1647
- Died: 20 January 1723 (aged 75)
- Spouse: William Louis, Prince of Anhalt-Köthen; Augustus, Duke of Schleswig-Holstein-Sonderburg-Plön-Norburg
- House: House of Ascania
- Father: Frederick, Prince of Anhalt-Harzgerode
- Mother: Johanna Elisabeth of Nassau-Hadamar

Elizabeth Charlotte of Anhalt-Harzgerode (11 February 1647 – 20 January 1723) was a Princess of Anhalt-Harzgerode by birth and by marriage Princess of Anhalt-Köthen and later Duchess of Schleswig-Holstein-Sonderburg-Norburg.

== Life ==
She was the daughter of Frederick, Prince of Anhalt-Harzgerode and his first wife Princess Johanna Elisabeth of Nassau-Hadamar.

She married twice. Her first husband was William Louis, Prince of Anhalt-Köthen. After he died in 1665, she married Duke Augustus, Duke of Schleswig-Holstein-Sonderburg-Plön-Norburg.

From her second marriage she had the following children:

- Joachim Frederick, Duke of Schleswig-Holstein-Sonderburg-Plön (1668-1722), married:

1. Magdalena Juliana, Countess of Palatinate-Birkenfeld-Gelnhausen
2. Juliana Louise, Princess of Ostfriesland (1698-1721)

- Elisabeth Auguste (1669-1709), a nun at Herford Abbey
- Sophie Charlotte (1672-1720)
- Christian Charles (20 August 1674 – 23 May 1706), married Dorothea Christina of Aichelberg (1674-1762), from 1702 Lady of Karlstein, from 1722 Princess of Denmark
- Johanna Dorothea (24 December 1676 – 29 November 1727), married Prince William II of Nassau-Dillenburg (1670-1724)

After the death of her second husband, she lived at her widow seat, Østerholm Castle on Als Island. In the dispute about the status of Christian Charles's marriage and his son's ability to inherit Schleswig-Holstein-Plön, she supported her daughter-in-law and former lady-in-waiting Dorothea Christina.
