= Johanna Elisabeth of Nassau-Hadamar =

Princess

- Born: 17 January 1619; Dillenburg
- Died: 2 March 1647 (aged 28); Harzgerode
- Noble family: House of Nassau
- Spouse: Frederick, Prince of Anhalt-Harzgerode
- Father: John Louis, Prince of Nassau-Hadamar
- Mother: Ursula of Lippe-Detmold

Johanna Elisabeth von Nassau-Hadamar (17 January 1619, in Dillenburg – 2 March 1647, in Harzgerode) was a princess of Nassau-Hadamar by birth, and by marriage a princess of Anhalt-Harzgerode.

== Life ==
Her father was Prince John Louis of Nassau-Hadamar, her mother was Ursula of Lippe-Detmold, a daughter of Count Simon VI of Lippe. She died in 1647 and her husband survived her.

== Marriage and issue ==
She married Prince Frederick of Anhalt-Harzgerode in 1642. She was his first wife. They had the following children:

- William Louis (1643-1709), Prince of Anhalt-Harzgerode, married
  1. in 1671 to Countess Elizabeth Albertine of Solms-Laubach (1631-1693)
  2. in 1695 to Princess Sophie Auguste of Nassau-Dillenburg (1666-1733)
- Anna Ursula (1645-1647)
- Elizabeth Charlotte (1647-1723), married
  1. in 1663 to Prince William Louis of Anhalt-Köthen (1638-1665)
  2. in 1666 Duke Augustus of Schleswig-Holstein-Sonderburg-Plön-Norburg (1635-1699)

== Sources ==
- Siebigk, Ferdinand (1878). "Friedrich". Allgemeine Deutsche Biographie 7 (in German). Archived from the original on July 16, 2026.
