= Traventhal House =

Summer residence of the dukes of Schleswig-Holstein-Sonderburg-Plön, Germany

Coordinates: 53°53′31″N 10°19′03″E

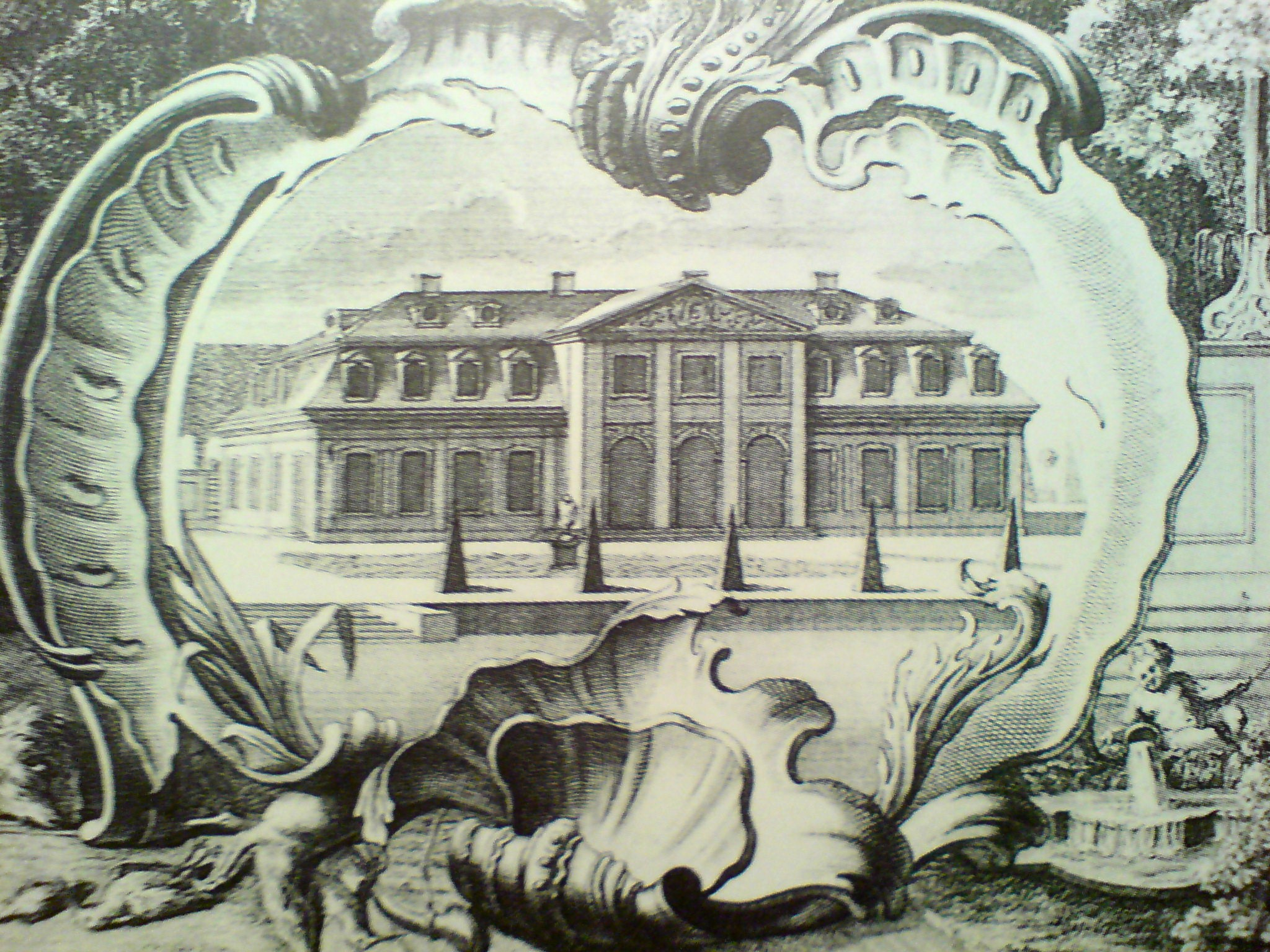
Main building of Traventhal House around 1760. Part of a copperplate engraving by G.Heumann

Traventhal House (German: Schloss Traventhal) in the municipality of Traventhal near Bad Segeberg in the southern part of the German state of Schleswig-Holstein was the summer residence of the dukes of Schleswig-Holstein-Sonderburg-Plön. In the 18th century the house was renowned for its Baroque garden, which was the largest and most significant of its kind in the duchies. On the dissolution of the Duchy of Plön in 1761 the brief heyday of the stately home came to an end. The original house was demolished at the end of the 19th century and replaced by a new building typical of the time in a historicist architecture style.

== Sources ==
- Hartwig Beseler (Hrsg.): Kunsttopographie Schleswig-Holstein. Neumünster 1974, S. 767.
- Hubertus Neuschäffer: Schleswig-Holsteins Schlösser und Herrenhäuser. Husum Verlag, Husum 1992, ISBN 3-88042-462-4.
- Peter Hirschfeld: Herrenhäuser und Schlösser in Schleswig-Holstein. Deutscher Kunstverlag, München 1980, ISBN 978-3-422-00712-3.
- Hans und Doris Maresch: Schleswig-Holsteins Schlösser, Herrenhäuser und Palais. Husum Verlag, Husum 2006, ISBN 3-89876-278-5.
- Georg Dehio: Handbuch der Deutschen Kunstdenkmäler. Hamburg, Schleswig-Holstein. Deutscher Kunstverlag, München 1994, ISBN 978-3-422-03033-6.
