= Mary von Waldersee =

Mary Esther Lee
- Princess of Noer; Countess von Waldersee
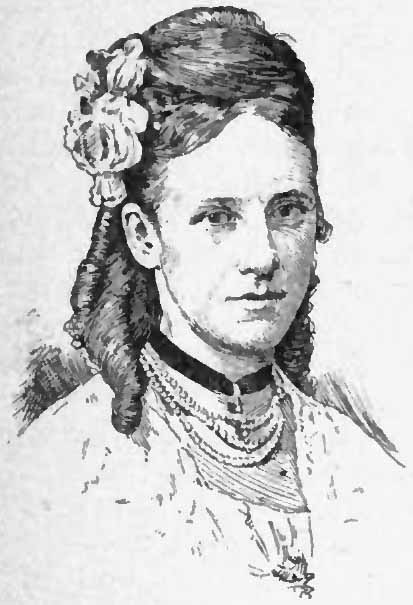
- Portrait from 1889
- Born: Mary Esther Lee; 3 October 1837; New York City, New York, U.S.
- Died: 4 July 1914 (aged 76); Hanover, Kingdom of Prussia
- Spouse: Frederick, Prince of Noer (m. 1864; died 1865) Count Alfred von Waldersee (m. 1874; died 1904)
- Occupation: Philanthropist
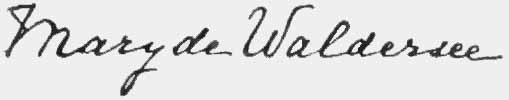
- Signature

Mary, Countess von Waldersee (born Mary Esther Lee, formerly Princess of Noer; 3 October 1837 – 4 July 1914), was an American-born philanthropist in Germany. She was married in turn to Prince Frederick of Schleswig-Holstein-Sonderburg-Augustenburg and to Count Alfred von Waldersee, the successor of Field-Marshal von Moltke.

== Early life ==
She was the youngest daughter of David Lee, a New York merchant, and Anne Duryee Phillips Lee. When David Lee died, he left his widow and five children a large fortune, and they moved to Europe in January 1853. The second daughter, Abby Blanche, married Augustus Charles Murray (a commander in the British Navy who was a grandson of John Murray, 4th Earl of Dunmore), and the third, Josephine (1833–1930), married Baron August von Wächter, Ambassador of the King of Württemberg to the court of Napoleon III.

== Personal life ==
Mary's elder sister, the Baroness von Waechter, sent for her to live with her in Paris, where she met and later married Prince Frederick of Schleswig-Holstein-Sonderburg-Augustenburg on 3 November 1864. Prince Frederick was a son of Princess Louise Auguste of Denmark, who had been driven into exile by the Austro-Prussian army in 1864. Prince Frederick, a widower, had four children with his first wife, Countess Henriette Danneskiold-Samsøe. Frederick's brother was married to Henriette's elder sister.

Mary Lee, not wishing to enter into a morganatic marriage, induced the prince to renounce his rights and titles as a member of the royal house of Denmark. He subsequently accepted from the Emperor of Austria the title of Prince of Noer, from the name of his principal estate, and she was made Princess of Nöer. The prince died during the summer after his marriage while on a trip to the Holy Land, on 2 July 1865, leaving her his $4,000,000 estate. The princess then returned to Paris, where she resided with her sister, Baroness von Waechter, until the beginning of the Franco-Prussian War, when she accompanied the latter to Württemberg.

=== Second marriage ===
On 14 April 1874, she married Count Alfred von Waldersee, a German military officer. She was particularly close to her first husband's niece, Augusta Victoria, who became the German Empress, and this close relationship also came to include Wilhelm II, who was a frequent guest of the Waldersees in Berlin. The relationship may have developed into a physical one, according to Alson J. Smith in A View of the Spree, after the Waldersees moved to Berlin. There, she soon became widely known through her political salon and her interest in local charities.

While she resided in Berlin, she was equally zealous in good works. For some years, she worked with the antisemitic Reverend Adolf Stoecker, director of the Berlin City Mission. Though she may not have been aware of Stoecker's antisemitism, she did help him obtain a court chaplaincy in 1874, which he filled until 1890. She was for years the friend of German Emperor Frederick III and of Empress Victoria, until the women fell out over the direction in which Germany should move. Empress Victoria envisioned an English-style constitutional monarchy, while Countess von Waldersee wanted "...the crown to rest on the head of a pious and socially concerned Christian ruler, but one who was also a politically conservative Pan-German nationalist in the Prussian rather than the English tradition."

She continued a pious life in Altona and Hannover, where her husband was appointed to, and supported the German branch of YMCA, founded by her friend Friedrich von Schlümbach, as well as other charitable organizations, like the Hamburg City Mission.

Her second husband died on 5 March 1904. The Countess of Waldersee died at her home in Hanover on 4 July 1914. After her death, she left two-fifths of her approximately $750,000 estate to her husband's niece, Blanche, Baroness von Palm, and one-fifth to three of his nephews, Col. Count George von Waldersee, Capt. Count Franz von Waldersee, and Maj. Count Gustav von Waldersee.

== Bibliography ==
- Wilson, J. G.; Fiske, J., eds. (1889). "Waldersee, Mary" . Appletons' Cyclopædia of American Biography. New York: D. Appleton. This source gives the date of her marriage to von Waldersee as 1871; the English and German articles on Alfred von Waldersee give the date as 1874.
- Alson J. Smith: A View of the Spree, Publisher:John Day Company, New York, 1962
- Richard Jay Hutto: Crowning Glory. American Wives of Princes and Dukes, Henchard Press, Macon, Ga., 2007
- Richard Jay Hutto: The Kaiser's Confidante: Mary Lee, the First American-Born Princess, McFarland & Co., 2017.
