= Martin Ernst von Schlieffen =

Martin Ernst von Schlieffen (30 October 1732 in Pudenzig, Pomerania – 15 February 1825 near Heiligenrode) was a German general, politician, writer and garden architect.

Schlieffen was the son of the Prussian officer and landowner, Hans Michael von Schlieffen and his wife Anna Helena von Petersdorff. He was a member of the Schlieffen family, which belonged to the German nobility. In 1745 he joined the Prussian army. He served in the garrison regiment in Berlin, until the regiment was divided into smaller garrisons in Eberswalde, Bernau and Templin. In 1749 he was transferred to the Guards in Potsdam, with King Frederick II. Through reading, he educated himself as a writer. In 1755 he got a lung infection and was dismissed from the Prussian military, and was not re-employed in 1757 after his recovery. In 1757 he joined the Hessian military, and by 1763 had become a general. He had served time as adjutant-general to Duke Ferdinand of Brunswick-Wolfenbüttel. In 1772 he was promoted to lieutenant-general by Landgrave Frederick II of Hesse-Kassel, and made Minister of State of Hesse. He was also made a knight of the Order of the Golden Lion. Schlieffen became the most important adviser of Landgraves Frederick II and William IX. In 1776 he accompanied to London the troops that had been lent to England by the Hessian Landgrave for the war in North America.

In 1789 he entered the service of Prussia again under Frederick William II. He became governor of the Wesel citadel and was soon awarded the Order of the Black Eagle. In the following years, he undertook several diplomatic missions at home and abroad. In 1790 he commanded the troops marching into Liège. In 1792 he resigned from the army.

He withdrew to his estate at Windhausen, but also lived some of the time in Mecklenburg. For his retirement home at Windhausen, he built Schloss Windhausen, as well as the Germanic Gardens next to it. He devoted himself to scientific studies and was a prolific writer, for which he received membership in the Prussian and the Bavarian Academy of Sciences (1808). He was a friend of Friedrich Schiller. The author wrote a family history of the von Schlieffens, as well as an autobiography.

In the Kingdom of Westphalia, he was made a Baron on 2 April 1813 and was three times awarded the Order of the Crown of Westphalia (he was made a Knight on 5 February 1810; a Commander on 28 March 1811 and a Knight Commander in October 1813).

He died at the age of 92 years.

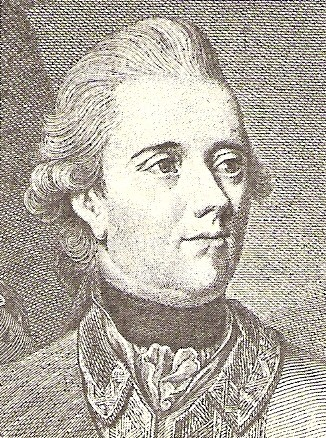
Martin Ernst von Schlieffen, was a German general, politician and writer.
