= Friedrich Wilhelm von Gaudi =

Friedrich Wilhelm Ernst Freiherr von Gaudi (Gaudy) (23 August 1725 in Spandau, Berlin – 13 December 1788 in Wesel) was a Prussian Lieutenant General who served Frederick the Great in the Seven Years' War.

His father was Andreas Erhard von Gaudi, a Prussian colonel who died in action near Habelschwerdt on 14 February 1745. His mother was Maria Elisabeth von Grävenitz.

Gaudi came from a noble, originally Scottish family, which had served the rulers of Brandenburg for more than 100 years. He studied in Königsberg, and then in 1744 entered the Infantry Regiment "Prinz Heinrich" (Nr. 35). He participated in the war in Bohemia, the siege of Prague, and the withdrawal to Silesia. Then he was detailed to recruitment activities. In 1750 he became a Second Lieutenant, and in 1755 a First Lieutenant. He was made a Captain in 1756, as well as aide-de-camp to Frederick the Great. In this capacity he served in the Seven Years' War. He was present at the battles of Prague, Kolin, Rossbach and Leuthen. In the course of the war he was appointed as chief of staff to both Hans Joachim von Zieten and Johann Dietrich von Hülsen. In 1760 he distinguished himself in the Battle of Strehlen, and was rewarded with the Pour le Mérite and a promotion to major. On 1 March 1763 he was made commander of a fusilier regiment in Wesel. In 1767 he became a lieutenant colonel and, in 1770, commander of the Hessen-Kassel Regiment. In 1771 he was promoted to colonel. On 19 June 1779, he was made a major general and commander of the Infantry Regiment Nr. 44.

In 1778 he was supposed to serve in the War of the Bavarian Succession, but had a riding accident near Hildesheim and broke his leg. In 1785, he became Inspector of the Regiments in Westphalia and on 20 May 1787 was made a lieutenant general. In June he became governor of the Wesel citadel. On 13 September 1787 he took command of a unit in Prussia which was sent to the Netherlands, to quell unrest there. Gaudi managed to do so without much bloodshed.

Friedrich Wilhelm von Gaudi died on 13 December 1788 as governor of the Wesel citadel.
