= Alfred von Schlieffen =

German field marshal (1833–1913)

Generalfeldmarschall Graf Alfred von Schlieffen
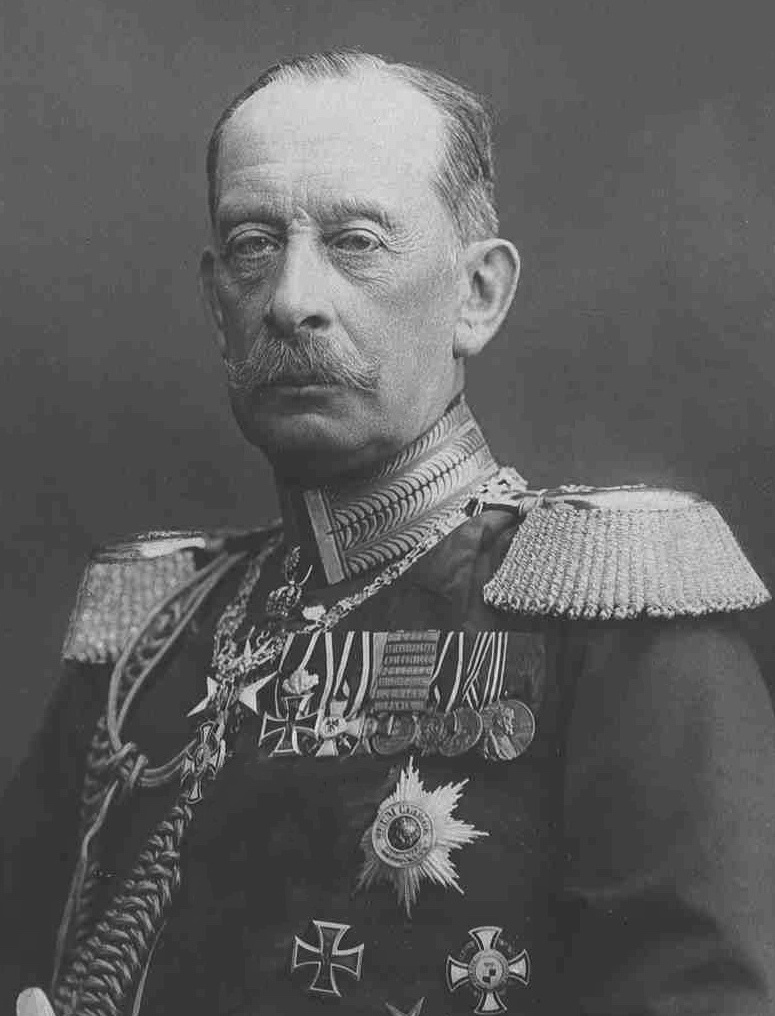
- Alfred von Schlieffen in 1906

Chief of the German Great General Staff
- In office 7 February 1891 – 1 January 1906
- Monarch: Wilhelm II
- Chancellor: Leo von Caprivi; Chlodwig zu Hohenlohe-Schillingsfürst; Bernhard von Bülow
- Preceded by: Alfred von Waldersee
- Succeeded by: Helmuth von Moltke the Younger

Personal details
- Born: 28 February 1833 Berlin, Province of Brandenburg, Kingdom of Prussia, German Confederation
- Died: 4 January 1913 (aged 79) Berlin, German Empire
- Resting place: Invalidenfriedhof, Berlin
- Spouse: Anna Gräfin von Schlieffen (m. 1868; died 1872)
- Children: 2
- Known for: the Schlieffen Plan

Military service
- Allegiance: Kingdom of Prussia (1853–1871); German Empire: Kingdom of Prussia (1871–1906)
- Branch/service: Prussian Army; Imperial German Army
- Years of service: 1853–1906
- Rank: Generalfeldmarschall
- Commands: 1st Guards Uhlans
- Battles/wars: Austro-Prussian War; Battle of Königgrätz; Franco-Prussian War
- Awards: Order of the Black Eagle

Graf Alfred von Schlieffen (German pronunciation: [ɡʁaːf ˈalfʁeːt fɔn ˈʃliːfn̩]; 28 February 1833 – 4 January 1913) was a German and Prussian officer and strategist, eventually reaching the rank of field marshal. He served as chief of the Imperial German General Staff from 1891 to 1906. His name is most known for the 1905–06 "Schlieffen Plan", then Aufmarsch I, a deployment plan and operational guide for a decisive initial offensive operation/campaign in a two-front war against the French Third Republic and the Russian Empire.

== Biography ==
Born in Prussia, Germany, on 28 February 1833, the son of a Prussian Army officer, he was part of an old Prussian noble family, the Schlieffen family. He lived with his father, Major Magnus von Schlieffen, on their estate in Silesia, which he left to go to school in 1842. The young Schlieffen had shown no interest in joining the military and so he did not attend the traditional Prussian cadet academies. Instead, he studied at the University of Berlin. While he was studying law, he enlisted in the army in 1853 for his one year of compulsory military service. Then, instead of joining the reserves, he was chosen as an officer candidate. He thus started a long military career, working his way up through the officer ranks, eventually completing 53 years of service.

In 1868, fifteen years into his military career, Schlieffen married his cousin Countess Anna Schlieffen. They had one healthy child (Elisabeth Auguste Marie Ernestine Gräfin von Schlieffen, 13 September 1869 – 23 September 1943), but after the birth of a second (Marie, who became a nun), his wife died. Schlieffen then focused all of his attention on his military work.

== Military service ==
On the recommendation of his commanders, Schlieffen was admitted to the General War School in 1858 at the age of 25, much earlier than others. He graduated in 1861 with high honours, which guaranteed him a role as a General Staff officer. In 1862, he was assigned to the Topographic Bureau of the General Staff, providing him with geographical knowledge and a respect for the tactical and strategic value of terrain and weather that would serve him well throughout his career, particularly in the war games he conducted and in the devising of various war plans, including the famous Schlieffen Plan. In 1865 he was transferred to the German General Staff proper, though his role was initially a minor one. He first saw active war service as a staff officer with the Prussian Cavalry Corps at the Battle of Königgrätz of 1866, during the Austro-Prussian War. The tactical "battle of encirclement" conducted there was from that point forward a constant feature of his tactical doctrine, even as his strategic doctrine consistently favoured the counter-offensive due to both his understanding of the terrain and his respect for von Clausewitz's assessment of the constantly diminishing strength of the offensive.

During the Franco-Prussian War, he commanded a small force in the Loire Valley, in what was one of the most difficult campaigns fought by the Prussian Army in France. Frederick I, Grand Duke of Baden, promoted him to Major and head of the military history division. After years working alongside Helmuth von Moltke and Alfred von Waldersee, on 4 December 1886 he was promoted to Major General, and shortly afterwards, with the retirement of Moltke, became Waldersee's Deputy Chief of Staff. Not long after this, he became Quartermeistergeneral, then Lieutenant General on 4 December 1888, and eventually General of the Cavalry on 27 January 1893.

In 1904, on the occasion of the Herero rebellion in German South West Africa (present-day Namibia), Chief of the General Staff Schlieffen was supportive of Lothar von Trotha's genocidal policies against the Herero and Nama peoples, saying: "The race war, once commenced, can only be ended by annihilation or the complete enslavement of one party". He agreed in principle with Trotha's notorious Vernichtungsbefehl ("extermination order") of 2 October 1904, even justifying the many cases of killing of Herero women by the Germans, writing "If ... women have been shot, then one must remember that women have not only participated in the fighting, they have also been the main originators of the cruel and horrible martyrdom that our wounded have often been subjected to, and that the sight of these victims ... provoked the comrades to forgivable fury." Only after the intervention of Chancellor Bernhard von Bülow and the fear that Germany's international image will be stained did Schlieffen agree, in December 1904, to repeal Trotha's orders to kill on the spot unarmed and surrendering Hereros.

In August 1905, at the age of 72, Schlieffen was kicked by a companion's horse, making him "incapable of battle". After nearly 53 years of service, Schlieffen retired on New Year's Day, 1906. He died on 4 January 1913, just 19 months before the outbreak of the First World War. His last words are said to have been, "Remember: keep the right wing very strong" (in reference to the main strategic manoeuvre of Aufmarsch I West), but the tale is believed to be apocryphal and to have originated decades after his death.

== The German Army ==
For Schlieffen, the smaller rate of conscription into the German army (55 per cent, compared to France's rate of 80 per cent), created a numerical imbalance, which was worsened by the Franco-Russian Alliance of 1896. German tactical and operational abilities could not compensate for this quantitative inferiority. Schlieffen had wanted to institute universal conscription and raise as many combat units from trained reservists as possible. Conscription policy was controlled by the Prussian Ministry of War, which answered to the Reichstag. Schlieffen planned to create masses of new units when war came, when he would assume command of the army. Upon mobilisation, large numbers of reservists would be assigned to replacement battalions (Ersatzbataillone), while waiting to join the field army.

From June 1891, Schlieffen proposed to form Ersatzbataillone into brigades in the field army, but the units were not effective forces. Replacement units as field units would also not be able to replace field army casualties. The War Ministry rejected Schlieffen's proposals, and nothing was done until 1911, six years after Schlieffen's retirement, when six Ersatz divisions were formed by General Erich Ludendorff. Schlieffen continued to believe in the mass use of Ersatzbataillone, making them fundamental to the Denkschrift (memorandum or think piece) which became known as the Schlieffen Plan (January 1906). The Denkschrift was not a campaign plan, as Schlieffen had retired on 31 December 1905 and the 96 divisions needed to carry out this one-front war plan did not exist (in 1914 the German army had 79, of which 68 were deployed in the west). Rather, it was a demonstration of what Germany might accomplish if universal conscription was introduced.

Schlieffen thought that even this hypothetical 96-division German army would probably not be able to defeat France,

These preparations [encircling Paris] can be made any way that you like: it will soon become clear that we will be too weak to continue the operation in this direction. We will have the same experience as that of all previous conquerors, that offensive warfare both requires and uses up very strong forces, that these forces become weaker even as those of the defender become stronger, and this is especially true in a land that bristles with fortresses.

Without twelve Ersatz divisions on the right flank (in 1914 the German army had six which operated in Lorraine), outflanking Paris was impossible. Schlieffen admitted in the Denkschrift that Ersatz units could not catch the right wing by foot-marching, nor would the rail system suffice to move twelve Ersatz divisions to Paris. If they could not be sent to the right wing, they could be deployed practically anywhere else on the German front, either between Verdun and Mézières, at Metz or on the right bank of the Moselle. There is no evidence that Schlieffen conducted an exercise to test a scheme of manoeuvre similar to the one in the Denkschrift, an envelopment of Paris by the right flank, which would be surprising if this represented the pinnacle of Schlieffen's strategic thought. None of Schlieffen's surviving deployment plans (Aufmarsch), General staff rides (Generalstabsreisen) or war games (Kriegsspiele) bear any resemblance to the manoeuvre of the Schlieffen Plan; the plans are consistent with Schlieffen's counter-attack doctrine. On 11 December 1893 Schlieffen wrote a Denkschrift that represented the completion of his idea of mass warfare. When war came, the German government ought to declare full mobilisation in East Prussia, owing to its vulnerability to Russian cavalry raids. The East Prussian militia would use prepared equipment; behind this militia screen the German field army would deploy and then throw back the Russians.

== War planning ==
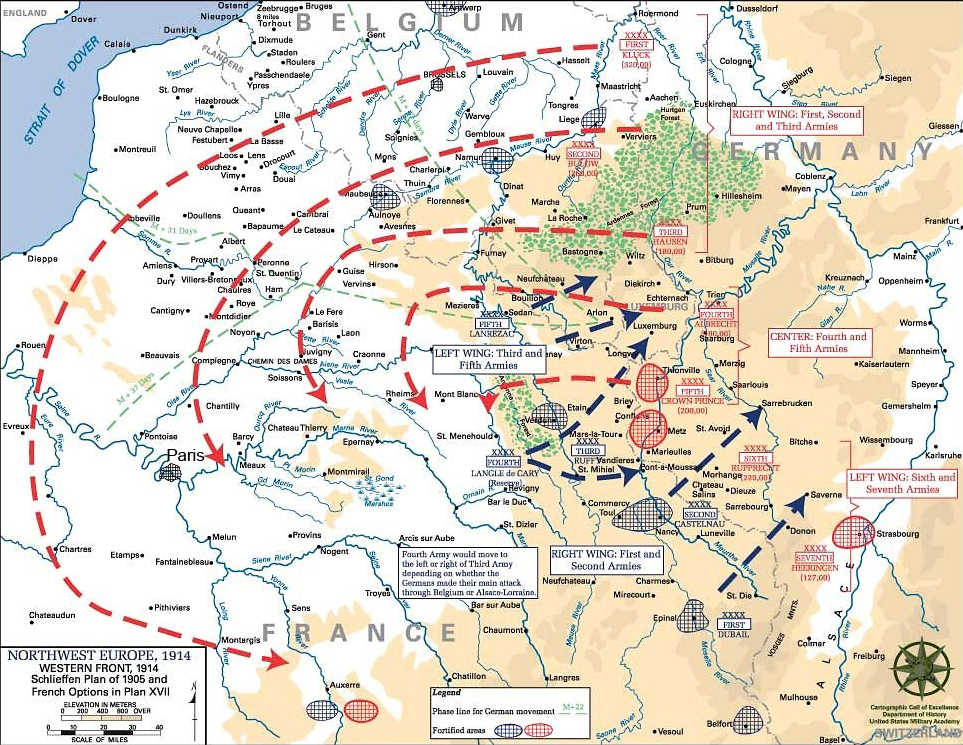
"Western Front 1914. Schlieffen Plan of 1905. French Plan XVII" (USMA) "...a mishmash...." and "An armchair strategist's dream....", according to Terence Zuber (2011)

The cornerstone of Schlieffen's war planning was undoubtedly the strategic counter-offensive. Schlieffen was a great believer in the power of the attack in the context of the defensive operation. Germany's smaller forces relative to the Franco-Russian Entente meant that an offensive posture against one or both was basically suicidal. On the other hand, Schlieffen placed great faith in Germany's ability to use its railways to launch a counter-offensive against a hypothetical French or Russian invasion force, defeat it, then quickly re-group her troops and launch a counter-offensive against the other. To quote Holmes:

The Generalstabsreise Ost [eastern wargame] of 1901 followed on from a Generalstabsreise West of the same year, in which the French attacked through Belgium and Luxembourg and were decisively beaten by a counter-attack on the left bank of the Rhine near to the Belgian border. It was this defensive victory that Schlieffen was referring to when he spoke of the need to crush one enemy first and then turn against the other. He insisted that the Germans 'must wait for the enemy to emerge from behind his defensive ramparts, which he will do eventually'. That was the approach adopted in this exercise, and the Germans won a decisive victory over the French.

Schlieffen also recognised the need for offensive planning, however, as failing to do so would limit the German Army's capabilities if the situation called for them. In 1897, starting from a plan of 1894, Schlieffen developed a tactical plan that – acknowledging the German army's limited offensive power and capacity for strategic manoeuvres – basically amounted to using brute force to advance beyond the French defences on the Franco-German border. To complement this unsophisticated manoeuvre and improve its chances of success he deemed it necessary to outflank the fortress line to the north and focus on destroying it from north–south starting at Verdun. This was a tactical plan centred around the destruction of the fortress-line that called for very little movement by the forces involved.

In 1905, however, Schlieffen developed what was truly his first plan for a strategic offensive operation – the Schlieffen plan Denkschrift (Schlieffen plan memorandum). This plan was based on the hypothesis of an isolated Franco-German war which would not involve Russia and called for Germany to attack France. The rough draft of this plan was so crude as not to consider questions of supply at all and be vague on the actual number of troops involved, but theorised that Germany would need to raise at least another 100,000 professional troops and 100,000 "ersatz" militiamen (the latter being within Germany's capabilities even in 1905) in addition to being able to count on Austro-Hungarian and Italian forces being deployed to German Alsace-Lorraine to defend it. The German Army would then move through the Dutch province of Limburg and northern Belgium, securing southern Belgium and Luxembourg with a flank-guard to protect both Germany and the main force from a French offensive during this critical manoeuvre [this being the point of the 1913 French Plan XVII].

Another factor considered for the plan was the size of armies of Germany herself and her enemies. Schlieffen calculated that Germany would have peacetime strength of 612,000, which is stronger than 593,000 of France. While the size of Russia's population and army was terrifying at first glance, Schlieffen did not see it as a great threat for his plans, considering the humiliating defeat of the Russian Army in the Russo-Japanese War, and, in his eyes, their poor railway system.

But it is here, in the second and final phase of the operation, that Schlieffen shows his true genius: he notes the immense strength of the French "second defensive area" in which the French can use the fortress-sector of Verdun, "Fortress Paris", and the River Marne as the basis of a very strong defensive line. Appreciating its defensive power, Schlieffen knew that he would have to try to force the French back from the Marne or at least secure a bridgehead over the Marne and/or Seine if he did not want the second German operation/campaign of the war to result in heavy losses. To do this, Schlieffen insisted that they cross the Seine to the west of Paris and, if they managed to cross in strength against sufficiently weak opposition, then they might even be able to force the French back from the westernmost sections of the Marne and surround Paris.

However, the bulk of Schlieffen's planning still followed his personal preferences for the counter-offensive. Aufmarsch II and Aufmarsch Ost (later Aufmarsch II West and Aufmarsch I Ost, respectively) continued to stress that Germany's best hope for survival if faced by a war with the Franco-Russian entente was a defensive strategy. This "defensive strategy", was reconciled with a very offensive tactical posture as Schlieffen held that the destruction of an attacking force required that it be surrounded and attacked from all sides until it surrendered, and not merely repulsed as in a "passive" defense:

Discussing the proper German response to a French offensive between Metz and Strasbourg, he insists that the invading army must not be driven back to its border position, but annihilated on German territory, and "that is possible only by means of an attack on the enemy's flank and rear". Whenever we come across that formula we have to take note of the context, which frequently reveals that Schlieffen is talking about a counter-attack in the framework of a defensive strategy [italics ours].

In August 1905, Schlieffen was kicked by a companion's horse, making him "incapable of battle". During his time off, now at the age of 72, he started planning his retirement. His successor was yet undetermined. Goltz was the primary candidate, but the Emperor was not fond of him. A favourite of the Emperor was Helmuth von Moltke the Younger, who became Chief of Staff after Schlieffen retired.

Moltke went on to devise Aufmarsch II Ost, a variant upon Schlieffen's Aufmarsch Ost designed for an isolated Russo-German war. Schlieffen seems to have tried to impress upon Moltke that an offensive strategy against France could work only for isolated Franco-German war, as German forces would otherwise be too weak to implement it. Thus, Moltke still attempted to apply the offensive strategy of Aufmarsch I West to the two-front war Germany faced in 1914 and Schlieffen's defensive plan Aufmarsch II West. With too few troops to cross west of Paris, let alone attempt a crossing of the Seine, Moltke's campaign failed to breach the French "second defensive sector" and his troops were pushed back in the Battle of the Marne.

== Influence ==
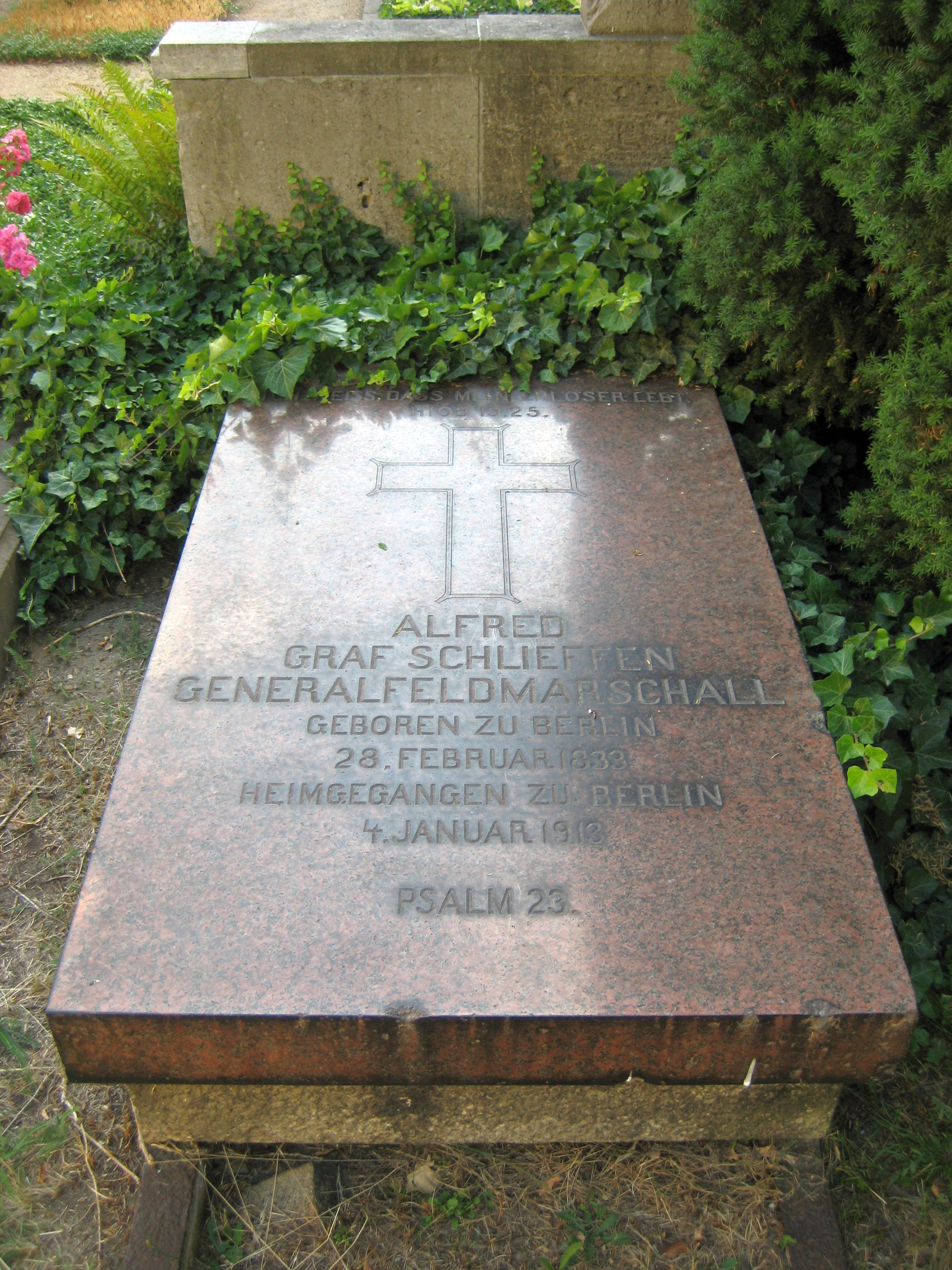
Grave at the Invalidenfriedhof Cemetery, Berlin

Schlieffen was perhaps the best-known contemporary strategist of his time, but he was criticised for his "narrow-minded military scholasticism."

Schlieffen's operational theories were to have a profound impact on the development of manoeuvre warfare in the 20th century, largely through his seminal treatise, Cannae, which concerned the decidedly un-modern 216 BCE Battle of Cannae in which Hannibal defeated the Romans. His treatise had two main purposes. First, it was to clarify, in writing, Schlieffen's concepts of manoeuvre, particularly the manoeuvre of encirclement, along with other fundamentals of warfare. Second, it was to be an instrument for the Staff, the War Academy, and for the Army altogether. His theories were studied exhaustively, especially in the higher army academies of the United States and Europe after the First World War. American military thinkers thought so highly of him that his principal literary legacy, Cannae, was translated at Fort Leavenworth and distributed within the US Army and to the academic community.

Along with the great militarist man that Schlieffen is famous for being, there are also underlying traits about Schlieffen that often go untold. As we know, Schlieffen was a strategist. Unlike the Chief of Staff, Waldersee, Schlieffen avoided political affairs and instead was actively involved in the tasks of the General Staff, including the preparation of war plans and the readiness of the German Army for war. He focused much of his attention on planning. He devoted time to training, military education and the adaptation of modern technology for the use of military purposes and strategic planning.

It was evident that Schlieffen was very much involved in preparing and planning for future combat. He considered one of his primary tasks was to prepare the young officers to act responsibly in planning manoeuvres but also to direct these movements after the planning had taken place.

With regards to Schlieffen's tactics, General Walter Bedell Smith, chief of staff to General Dwight D. Eisenhower, supreme commander of the Allied Expeditionary Force in the Second World War, pointed out that General Dwight Eisenhower and many of his staff officers, products of these academies, "were imbued with the idea of this type of wide, bold maneuver for decisive results."

General Erich Ludendorff, a disciple of Schlieffen who applied his teachings of encirclement in the Battle of Tannenberg, once famously christened Schlieffen as "one of the greatest soldiers ever."

Long after his death, the German General Staff officers of the interwar period and the Second World War, particularly General Hans von Seeckt, recognised an intellectual debt to Schlieffen theories during the development of the Blitzkrieg doctrine. The original plan for the 1940 German invasion of France was based on the Schlieffen Plan. Adolf Hitler, however, is said to have deprecated Schlieffen's memory, going so far as to command that Schlieffen's name never be uttered in his presence and to admonish Walter Scherff, official chronicler of the Wehrmacht, to omit Schlieffen's name from any histories he might write.

== Quotations ==
- "A man is born, and not made, a strategist."—Schlieffen
- "To win, we must endeavour to be the stronger of the two at the point of impact. Our only hope of this lies in making our own choice of operations, not in waiting passively for whatever the enemy chooses for us." — Schlieffen

== Honours and awards ==
German decorations

- Prussia:
  - Iron Cross (1870), 1st and 2nd Classes
  - Grand Cross of the Red Eagle, with Oak Leaves, Swords on Ring and Crown
  - Knight of the Prussian Crown, 1st Class
  - Grand Commander's Cross of the Royal House Order of Hohenzollern
  - Knight of the Black Eagle, with Collar and Diamonds 10.09.1897
  - War Commemorative Medal of 1870/71
  - Kaiser Wilhelm I Centenary Medal
- Hohenzollern: Cross of Honour of the Princely House Order of Hohenzollern, 1st Class
- Baden:
  - Grand Cross of the Zähringer Lion, with Oak Leaves, 1893
  - Knight of the House Order of Fidelity, 1899
- Bavaria:
  - Grand Cross of Merit of the Bavarian Crown, 1897
  - Knight of St. Hubert, 1903
  - Grand Cross of the Military Merit Order
- Hesse and by Rhine: Grand Cross of the Ludwig Order, 9 April 1903
- (Principality of Schaumburg-Lippe) Lippe: Cross of Honour of the House Order of Lippe, 1st Class
- Mecklenburg:
  - Grand Cross of the Wendish Crown, with Golden Crown
  - Military Merit Cross, 1st Class (Schwerin)
- Oldenburg: Grand Commander of Honour of the Order of Duke Peter Friedrich Ludwig
- Saxony:
  - Grand Cross of the Albert Order, with Golden Star, 1891
  - Knight of the Rue Crown
- Württemberg:
  - Grand Cross of the Württemberg Crown, 1893
  - Grand Cross of the Friedrich Order, 1893
  - Grand Cross of the Military Merit Order, 28 March 1903

Foreign decorations

- Austria-Hungary:
  - Knight of the Iron Crown, 1st Class, 1890
  - Grand Cross of the Imperial Order of Leopold, 1891; in Diamonds, 1895
  - Grand Cross of St. Stephen, 1897
- French Empire: Officer of the Legion of Honour
- Kingdom of Italy:
  - Grand Cross of Saints Maurice and Lazarus
  - Grand Cross of the Crown of Italy
- Netherlands: Grand Cross of the Netherlands Lion
- Ottoman Empire: Order of Osmanieh, 1st Class in Diamonds
- Persian Empire:
  - Order of the August Portrait
  - Order of the Lion and the Sun, 3rd Class
- Russian Empire: Knight of St. Alexander Nevsky, 1897
- Siam: Grand Cross of the White Elephant

== Footnotes ==
Military offices
Preceded by Count Waldersee	Chief of the General Staff; 1891–1906	Succeeded by Helmuth von Moltke
Preceded by Alfred von Waldersee	Quartermaster-General of the German Army; 10 August 1888 – 6 February 1891	Succeeded by Ernst Gustav Martin Köpke
