= Wesel Citadel =

Coordinates: 51°39′06″N 6°36′55″E

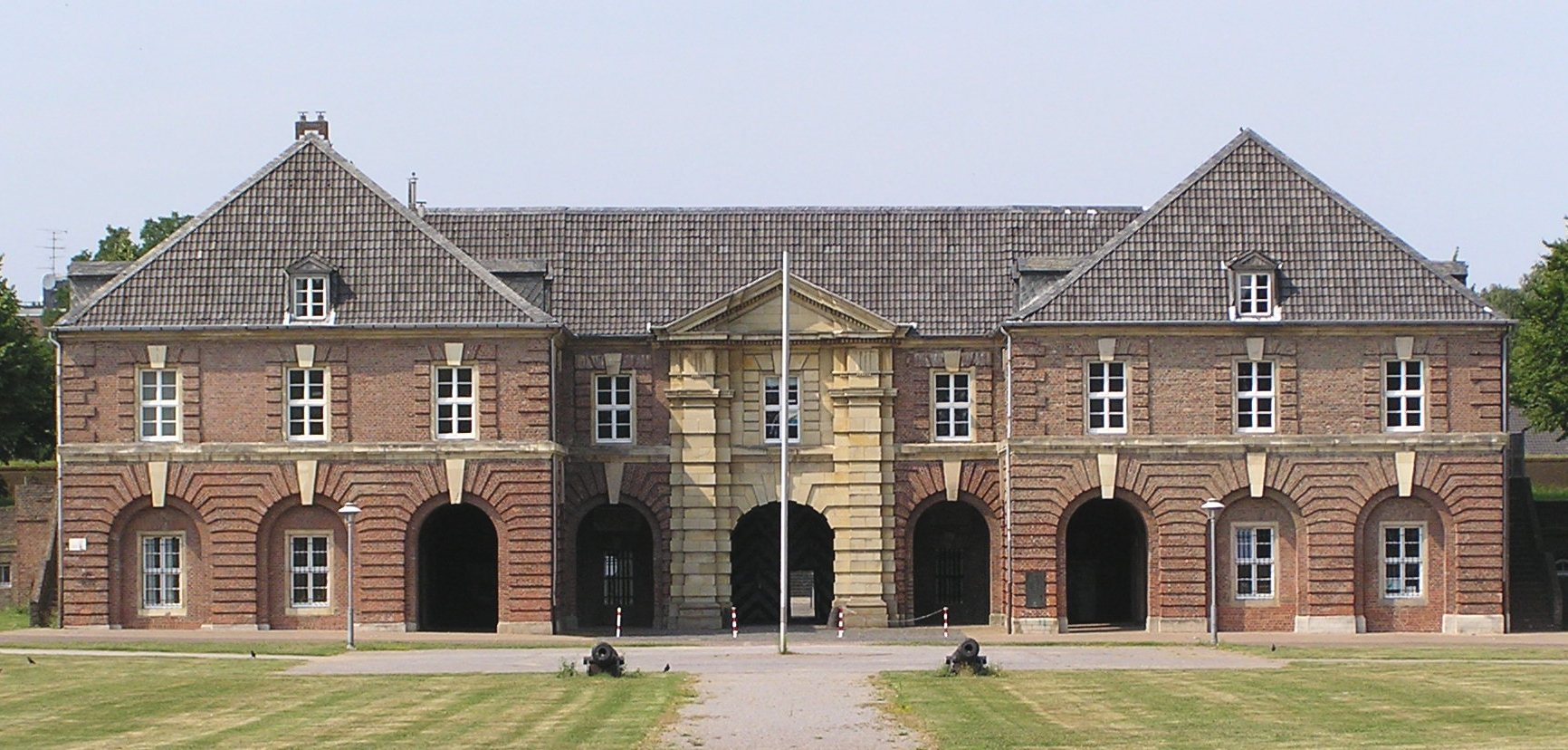
The main gate of the Wesel Citadel, seen from the central Waffenplatz

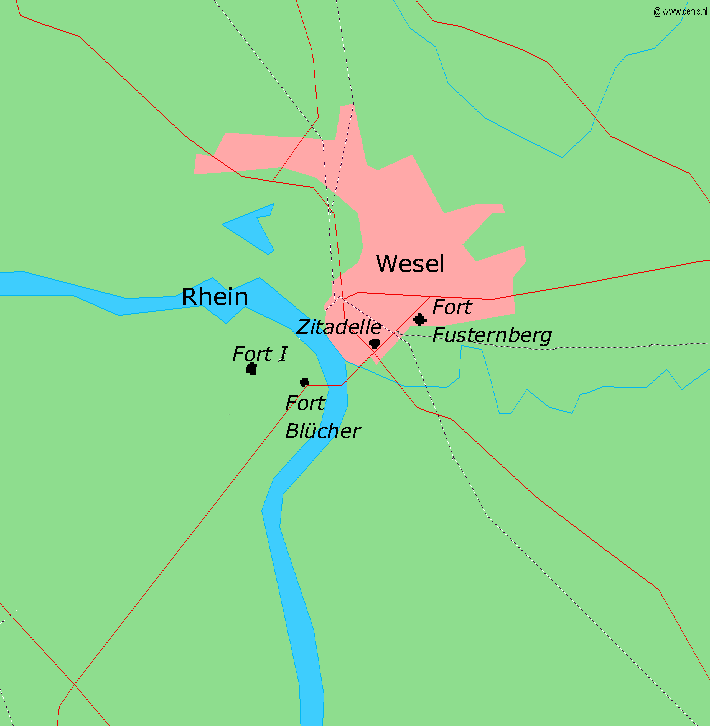

The Wesel Citadel is the largest intact fortification system of the Rhineland, built 1688–1722 in Wesel. It was built according to plans by Johan de Corbin, in the form of a pentagonal star, with each point of the star being a bastion. The citadel was the core of the fortress of Wesel, and is currently used as a cultural centre.

== Architecture ==
The main architectural features of the citadel can be derived from the principles of Sébastien Le Prestre de Vauban, the most prominent constructor of fortifications at the time. The construction costs of the phase built between 1668 and 1700 are estimated at 373,452 Reichsthaler. In subsequent years also, a substantial amount of funds flowed into the construction, for the years 1701 and 1702 the costs were 221,600 Reichsthaler. The entire Wesel fortification was at this time armed with 250 cannons.

In 1687, Frederick William I of Brandenburg ordered the construction of a citadel to turn Wesel into a fortified city. It was to be built in the south of the city and be connected to the existing city defences, and be equipped with 5 bastions and five ravelins. The main gate of the citadel was built in 1718. Probably before the mid-18th century, the citadel was expanded and strengthened on its south and east sides. In the period when the French occupied it (1805–1814), they constructed in the citadel a 2-floor brick building, which still stands today: the old Kaserne VIII (Barracks VIII).

The main gate is impressive in design; in the southern wing, there is a prison cell, in which amongst others eleven of Ferdinand von Schill's officers were detained.

== Current use ==
Due to their dismantling after World War I in 1919–1920, the old fortifications are no longer present today. Especially in the direction of the Rhine and the Lippe, where the enemy would have come from, the fortifications have disappeared. The only thing that reminds of the old gate there is a street name.

After its dismantlement in 1919/1920 after World War I, the following buildings remained:

- Main gate with curtain wall, bridge, tenaille, and trenches from 1718 (Jean de Bodt), renovated in 1823. Now contains the "Städtische Museum Abteilung Schillkasematte" (Local Museum Schill Case Matts). This gate is also fortified, but actually represented the connection to the city.
- Officers' prison from 1727 (now privately owned)
- Garrison bakery no. II from 1809. Houses the local archive with the restoration department.
- Barracks no. VIII from 1809. Was renovated for the "Musik- und Kunstschule" (Music and Art School) of the city.
- Körner magazine from 1835. This now contains the Prussian Museum of North Rhine Westphalia.

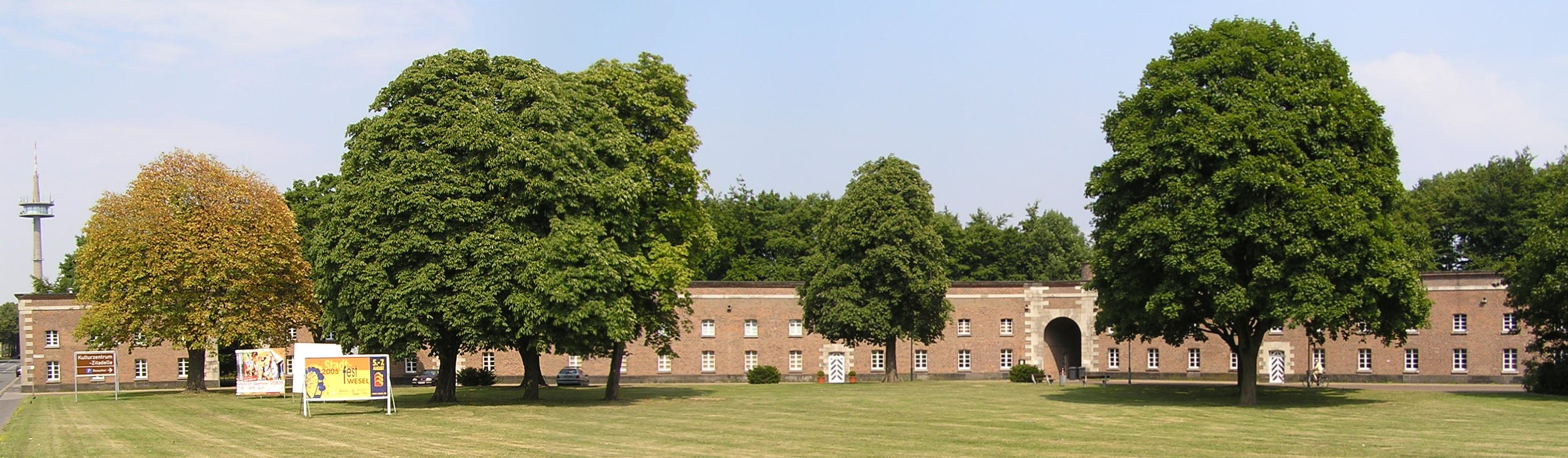

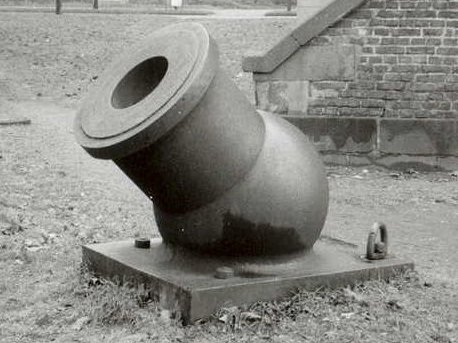
An old French mortar that was set up here after 1871

== List of governors ==
- 1675 Freiherr Alexander von Spaen, Generalfeldmarschall.
- 1692 Friedrich von Heiden (1633-1706), General of the Infantry
- 1702 Carl Philipp Reichsgraf von Wylich und Lottum (1650–1719), Generalfeldmarschall.
- 1719 Freiherr Johann Sigismund von Heyden. (†1730)
- 1730 Konrad Heinrich von der Mosel (1663-1733) General-Leutnant
- 1733 Hans Christoph von Bardeleben, General-Major (†1736)
- 175? Friedrich Wilhelm von Dossow (1669-1758), General of the Infantry
- 1756 Friedrich von Hessen-Kassel, General-Leutnant
- 1757 Heinrich August de la Motte Fouqué (1698-1774), General-Leutnant
- 1787-1788 Friedrich Wilhelm von Gaudi (1725-1788), General-Leutnant
- 1790 Martin Ernst von Schlieffen (1732-1825), General-Leutnant
- 1792 Alexander Friedrich von Woldeck (1720-1795), General-Leutnant
- 1796 Friedrich August Albrecht von Tschirschky (1734–1799), Generalmajor
- 1797 Landgraf Wilhelm von Hessen-Kassel, Generalfeldmarschall.
