= Alfred von Waldersee =

German field marshal (1832–1904)

Graf Alfred von Waldersee
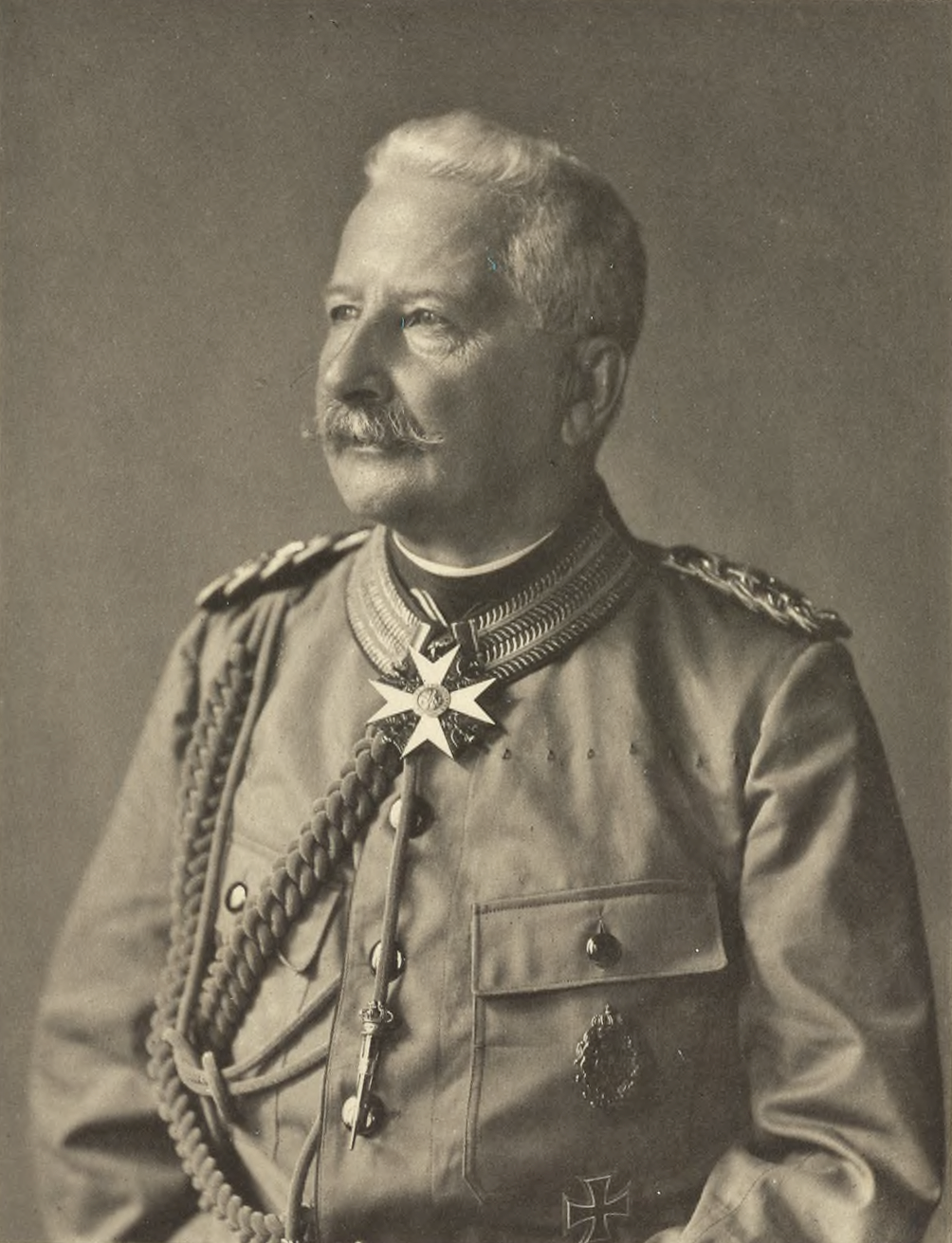
- Von Waldersee in 1902

Chief of the German General Staff
- In office 10 August 1888 – 7 February 1891
- Monarch: Wilhelm II
- Chancellor: Otto von Bismarck; Leo von Caprivi
- Preceded by: Helmuth von Moltke
- Succeeded by: Alfred von Schlieffen

Personal details
- Born: 8 April 1832 Potsdam, Brandenburg, Prussia
- Died: 5 March 1904 (aged 71) Hanover, Province of Hanover, Prussia, Germany
- Relations: Georg von Waldersee
- Nickname: Weltmarschall (World Marshal)

Military service
- Allegiance: Kingdom of Prussia (1850–1871) German Empire (1871–1904)
- Branch/service: Prussian Army Imperial German Army
- Years of service: 1850-1904
- Rank: Generalfeldmarschall
- Battles/wars: Austro-Prussian War; Franco-Prussian War; Boxer Rebellion

Alfred Heinrich Karl Ludwig Graf von Waldersee (8 April 1832 – 5 March 1904) was a German Generalfeldmarschall (field marshal) who served as Chief of the Imperial German General Staff and Commander of the International Relief Force during the Boxer Rebellion.

Born into a military family, von Waldersee saw decorated service as an artillery officer, and became Prussian military attaché at the Paris embassy in 1870. This gave him insight into the French defences that would prove crucial in the upcoming Franco-Prussian War, in which he played a significant role. Later, as principal assistant to Field-Marshal Helmuth von Moltke the Elder, Chief of the Imperial General Staff, von Waldersee gained influence with the future Kaiser Wilhelm II, who promoted him Chief of Staff on his accession.

When the Peking legation compound was besieged by the Boxer insurgents in 1900, von Waldersee was appointed as head of an eight-nation relief force. Although he arrived too late to take part in the fighting, he conducted punitive expeditions, which succeeded in pacifying the Boxers, and allegedly took a Chinese mistress, Sai Jinhua.

== Family ==
Alfred von Waldersee was the fifth of six children of the Prussian cavalry general Franz Heinrich von Waldersee (1791–1873) and Bertha von Hünerbein (1799–1859). Franz Heinrich von Waldersee was the son of Franz Anton von Waldersee (1763–1823), an illegitimate son of Leopold III Friedrich Franz, Duke of Anhalt-Dessau (1740–1817) and of Johanne Eleonore Hoffmeier (1739–1816). Nevertheless, Franz Anton was raised and educated at the ducal court and in 1786 was created a Graf, or Count.

The Waldersee family estate, Waterneverstorf, is located on the Baltic coast near Behrensdorf in the German federal state of Schleswig-Holstein.

== Early years and beyond ==
Waldersee was born at Potsdam into a military and aristocratic family. After attending several cadet schools, in 1850 he was commissioned as a Leutnant into the Artillery Corps of the Prussian army and he soon attracted the favorable notice of his superiors. In his first major campaign, the Austro-Prussian War of 1866, he served as aide-de-camp to General of Artillery Prince Friedrich Karl of Prussia, with whom he was present at Königgrätz. In the course of this campaign, Count Waldersee was promoted to major and assigned to the Prussian General Staff. Thereafter, he served on the staff of X Army Corps, a new formation in the conquered kingdom of Hanover. In January 1870, he became military attaché at the Paris embassy of Prussia. At this post he was able to gather intelligence on troop strengths and other information on the French military that proved valuable in the campaigns to come.

In the Franco-Prussian War, Lieutenant Colonel Count Waldersee, recognized for his military prowess and recent analysis of the adversary's armed forces, proved a most useful assistant to the "supreme War-Lord." He was present at the great battles around Metz, assigned to the staff of General Grand Duke of Mecklenburg-Schwerin; and later in operations against Chanzy's army on the Loire. The grand duke was a soldier, but not a tactician of note, and the successful outcome of the western campaign was largely due to his adviser, Waldersee.

At the end of the war, Waldersee received the Iron Cross, First Class, and was entrusted with the difficult post of German representative at Paris, in which his tact and courtesy were marked. At the end of 1871, Waldersee took command of the 13th Uhlan Regiment at Hanover, and two years later became chief of staff of the Hanoverian Army corps, in which he had served before 1870.

On 14 April 1874, he married Mary Esther Lee (1837–1914), third daughter of the wealthy New York City merchant David Lee and widow of Prince Frederick of Schleswig-Holstein. Mary had previously been created Princess of Nöer by the Emperor of Austria and her elder sister, Josephine, was the wife of Baron August von Wächter, the Württembergian Minister of Foreign Affairs. Mary became an advocate for the poor in Prussia and was honored for her compassion.

== The Great General Staff ==
In 1882, Waldersee was chosen by Field Marshal Helmuth von Moltke the Elder as his principal assistant on the General Staff at Berlin with the rank of Generalquartiermeister. With this appointment, Waldersee was already seen as the likely successor of the octogenarian field marshal. On several occasions Waldersee accompanied Prince Wilhelm, the future Kaiser Wilhelm II, on trips abroad to represent the prince's grandfather, Kaiser Wilhelm I. Out of these trips grew a tenuous teacher-student relationship, but Waldersee was seen by Wilhelm's liberal parents Crown Prince Friedrich Wilhelm and Victoria, Princess Royal as "anti-Semitic, narrowly zealous in religion, and reactionary... the quartermaster general was the personification of everything Wilhelm's parents most detested." The British historian John C. G. Röhl wrote that Waldersee "...seems to have suffered from some form of paranoid megalomania" as Waldersee believed in a vast Jewish world conspiracy in which the "entirety" of Jews around the world were working for the destruction of the Reich.

Chancellor Bismarck had been in power in Prussia and Germany for a generation, but by the mid-1880s the socio-political mood in Germany was changing. Socialists were gaining seats in the Reichstag, and the liberal middle-class had a friend in the crown prince. Bismarck, seeking to retain his own power, now looked to an alignment with the army, but he was weary and suspicious of Waldersee. Effectively already chief-of-staff in all but name, the count was "able but extravagantly ambitious, restlessly intriguing, [and he] more or less openly aspired to the chancellorship [himself]." In 1885, Waldersee wrote in his diary: "We have far too many enemies, the French, the Slavs, above all the Catholics [emphasis in the original], and then the entire little rabble of the dispossessed, with their supporters". In 1886, Waldersee wrote in his diary: "Everywhere the masses are on the move, everywhere there is rebellion against authority, the negation of all religion, the generation of hatred and envy against those with wealth. We are probably facing major catastrophes". In another diary entry, Waldersee wrote "The ghost of socialism is beginning to show a very earnest face" while he called the Zentrum a gang of "hypocritical blackguards without a Fatherland, intent on the collapse of Germany and the destruction of Prussia". Waldersee's view of the international situation was equally bleak with democracy established in France, Italy and Britain and autocracy faced with challenges in Russia, Austria-Hungary and the Ottoman empire. For Waldersee, only if the Reich held firm, which provided the foundation for the "mainstay for the whole of Europe, but if we become weak, the entire old world will fall apart". Waldersee believed that he would one day lead the forces of the Reich against all he hated in some apocalyptic war. Before the war could be launched, Waldersee argued that the "inner enemy" which consisted of the Progressive Party, the entire German Jewish community and the liberal Crown Prince Frederich and his British wife, the Crown Princess Victoria would have to be disposed of first. Waldersee dreaded the prospect that the Crown Prince Frederich would ascend to the throne as Waldersee believed that with Frederich as Emperor, Germany would become a democracy, the Junkers and the rest of the nobility would lose their privileged position and the Army would lose its "state within the state" status by bringing the military under civilian control. To stop all this from happening, Waldersee plotted to have the military stage a coup d'état to depose Frederich in favor of his son Prince Wilhelm if he should ascend to the throne; have Victoria expelled back to Britain; end universal manhood suffrage for the Reichstag and have Germany launch a war to "take out" France, Austria and Russia (the fact that Germany was allied to the last two did not matter to Waldersee). In a letter to Prince Wilhelm (the future Wilhelm II) in 1887, Waldersee wrote:

All the Progressive people with their supporters, the entire Judenschaft and most foreign countries, that is to say, taken together are formidable foes...In view of the colossal influence which the Jews wiled by virtue of their wealth, through which they have secured the services of Christians in influential positions, even though they themselves are few in number, they are by far the most dangerous of our enemies.

Shortly afterwards, Prince Wilhelm addressed a meeting of the anti-Semitic Christian Social Party headed by the Lutheran pastor Adolf Stoecker whom the prince praised as a "second Luther". In the international outcry that followed Wilhelm's address to Stoecker's party, Waldersee wrote in a letter to Wilhelm "the entire row in the press comes from the Jews" whose "attacks are aimed less at Stoecker than at the Prince". In his diary, Waldersee wrote "Too many people are under the influence of the Jews" whom he wrote were afraid of Wilhelm as were "all our enemies-the French, the Russians, the Progressives and the Social Democrats".

The General Staff knew of few of Bismarck's schemes, and Waldersee's outlook was on occasions at odds with foreign policy positions held by the chancellor. Waldersee, officially still second under Moltke, had been elevating the military attachés at the Imperial embassies into "a virtually independent diplomatic service", often managing to bypass the Foreign Ministry. After one such breach of protocol was detected at the Vienna embassy, Waldersee was subsequently "hauled over the coals" by Bismarck in person, to demonstrate to the military establishment who was in charge of foreign affairs. In 1888, the Emperor Wilhelm I died and Frederich become Emperor Frederich III, but as the new emperor was already dying of throat cancer, Waldersee cancelled his plans for a putsch, guessing correctly that Frederich would be dead soon enough and his friend, Wilhelm who was now Crown Prince, would soon be the Emperor. Field Marshal Moltke finally retired in August 1888, and Waldersee's appointment to succeed him was a foregone conclusion: the newly crowned 29-year-old Kaiser Wilhelm II gave his consent.

Waldersee essentially followed the Moltke line until he ran headlong into the often unpredictable young emperor. In 1890, at the autumn maneuvers [Kaisermanöver] of the Imperial Army, Waldersee had the effrontery to soundly "defeat" the formations under control of the impetuous Wilhelm II. Waldersee thus lost the confidence of his sovereign and was relieved of his duties and reassigned to command IX Army Corps at Hamburg-Altona, a clear demotion but still an assignment of importance. Waldersee, despite all that had happened, would establish his Hamburg residence near the Bismarck retirement estate at Friedrichsruh. In 1898, he was appointed inspector-general of the Third Army at Hanover, the transfer orders being accompanied by eulogistic expressions of Wilhelm II's goodwill.

== Expedition to China ==
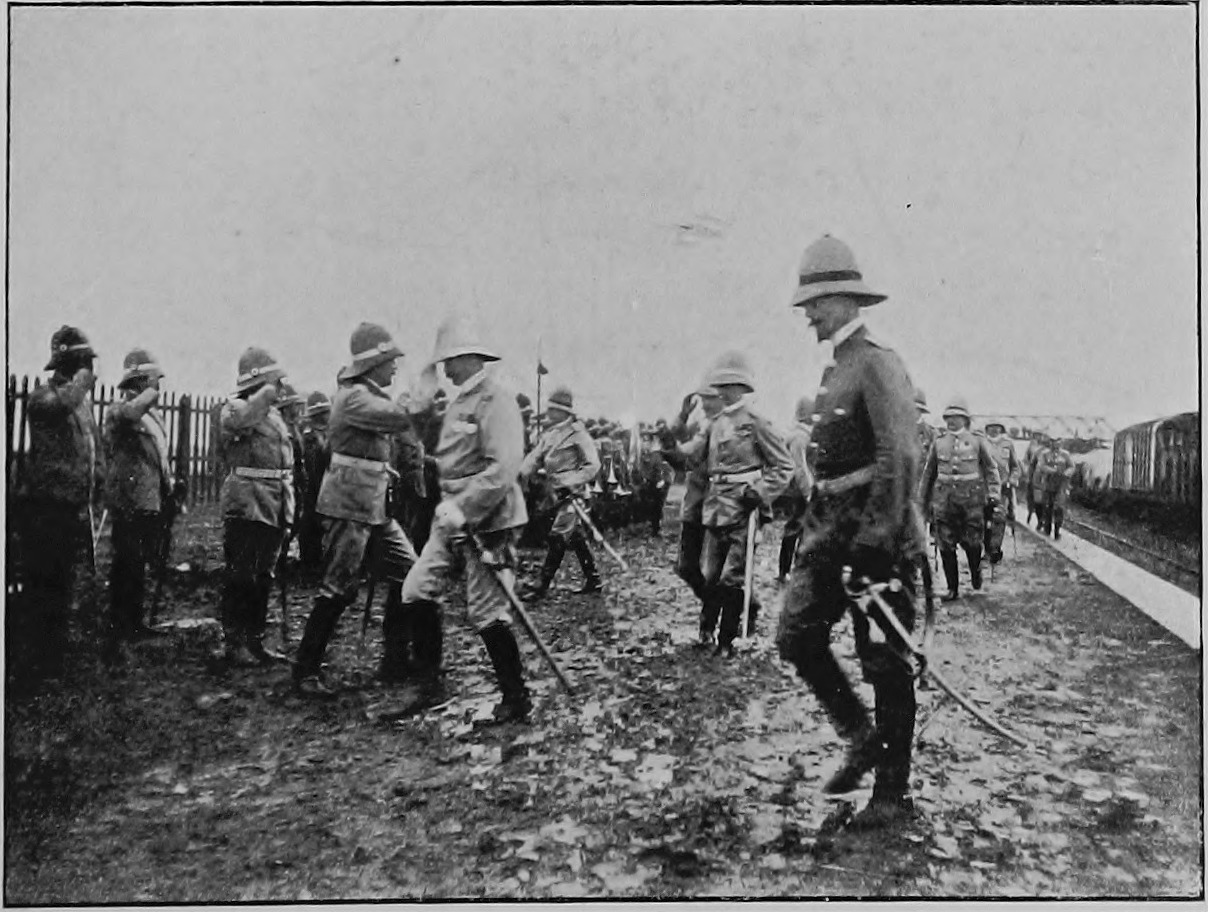
German Officers Welcoming Field-Marshal Count Von Waldersee At The Railway Station, Tientsin

Two thousand European and Chinese Christians were trapped in the legation compound at Peking by Boxer insurgents in 1900. An eight-nation International Relief Force of European, American and Japanese troops maneuvered to the rescue. As Kaiser Wilhelm II’s minister to China, Baron Clemens von Ketteler, had been murdered by the Boxers, the Germans "claimed a certain priority in the crusade against Chinese barbarism." Wilhelm II wanted Waldersee to command the expedition to China, which he announced to the world press had come as a result of the initiative of the Emperor Nicholas II of Russia. In fact, Wilhelm had a sent a telegram to his cousin Nicholas asking if he would object if Russian troops were to come under the command of a German general, to which Nicholas replied he had no objection, which Wilhelm then misrepresented at the press conference he called in Berlin as Nicholas having asked for Waldersee to command the expedition. The announcement which went had been made without consulting the other powers caused a great deal of stress for the Auswärtiges Amt who now had to convince the other powers to accept Waldersee's appointment, which was only done by threatening that Wilhelm would feel humiliated if Waldersee's command were in fact rejected by the other powers and this would strain relations with Germany, a form of blackmail that proved effective, through it damaged Germany's diplomatic standing. On 7 August 1900, Waldersee received a telegram from Wilhelm II telling him that he was now in command of the expedition. The now semi-retired, sixty-eight-year-old, but for the occasion the newly promoted Field Marshal Alfred Count von Waldersee was officially proposed by the Tsar of Russia, and seconded by the Japanese, as the first Allied Supreme Commander of modern times.

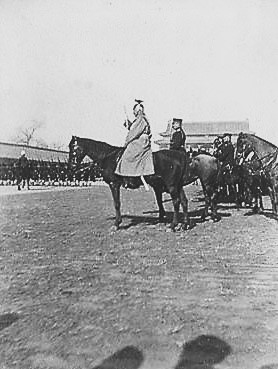
Count Waldersee in China

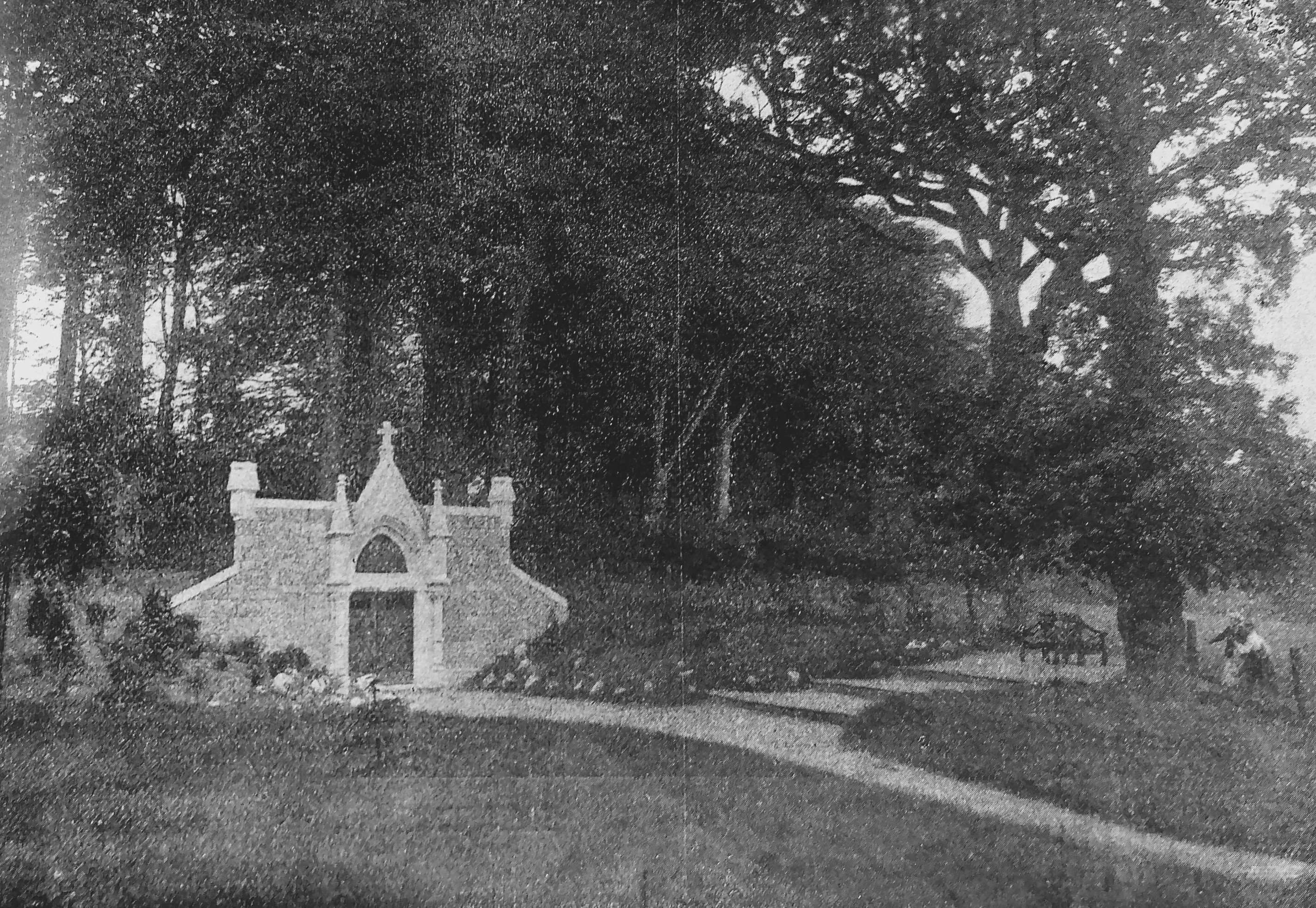
Grave of Field Marshal von Waldersee near Stöfs around 1906

Preparations for the field marshal's departure from Germany to China caused a good deal of satirical comment on what became known as Waldersee Rummel or "Waldersee theatricals", which he detested. Much of this circus, he wrote in his irritation "... unfortunately made it into the newspapers." Waldersee arrived at the front lines of Peking too late to direct his multinational force in any fighting of note, but was in charge of the pacification of the Boxers. Waldersee who had dreams of winning a glorious military victory in China was greatly disappointed that the main fighting was over after he arrived in Beijing on 17 October 1900, where he installed himself in the bedroom of the Dowager Empress in the Forbidden City. In his own words, Waldersee went to work with "feverish activity" by ordering 75 punitive expeditions in the countryside around Beijing, in which thousands of people— mostly women and children—were slain. "These punitive expeditions ... were unrewarding enterprises [and] from Waldersee's point of view ... hardly constituted war." It is probable, however, that "if his appointment had not existed, or if it had been filled by a less positive personality, the animosities which ceaselessly embittered the [international] contingents in North China would have assumed serious proportions. ... [In addition] there were countless minor incidents, and it is at least partly to Waldersee's credit that nothing came of them."

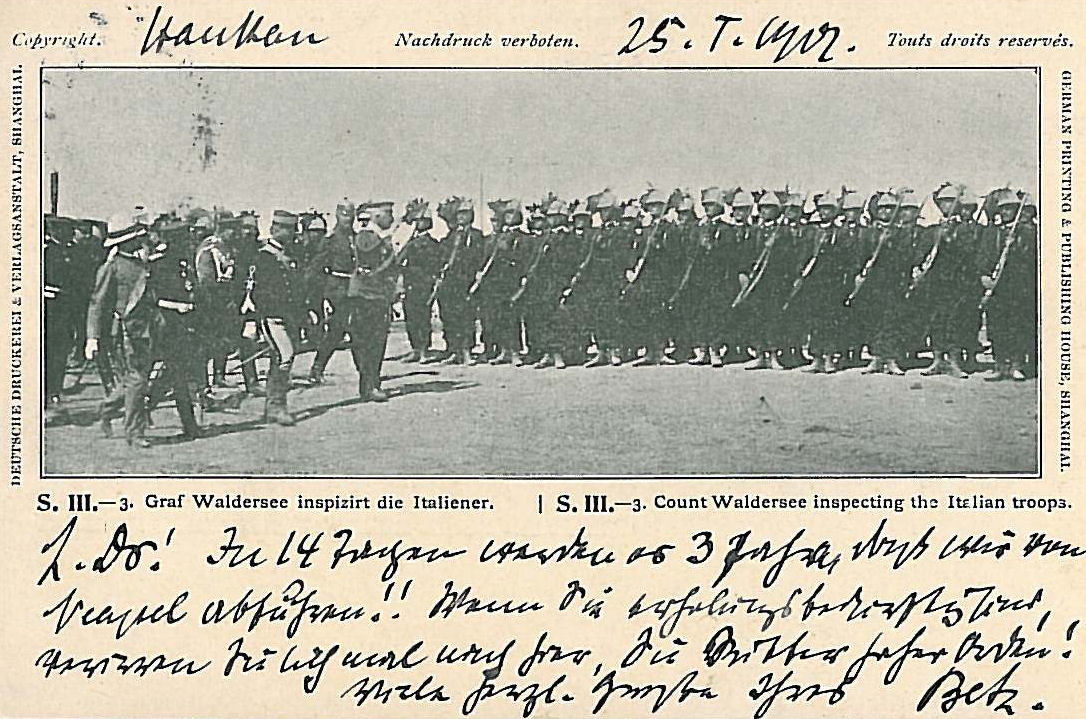
Postcard showing Waldersee inspecting Italian troops in China

A prostitute named Sai Jinhua, whom he had met in Europe, renewed her ‘acquaintanceship’ with Waldersee. Ying Hu wrote that "Legend has it that in their "dragon bed" of the Empress Dowager, which Sai and Waldersee shared, she tried and sometimes succeeded in curbing the brutality of the troops." Wenxian Zhang wrote that Sai Jinhua "was credited with influencing Waldsee [sic] to moderate the harsh treatment of Beijing residents." Sai Jinhua, in her biography, admitted that she was on good terms with Waldersee but, as stated by Hu Ying, she "vigorously" disputed that she had a sexual relationship with him.

Count Waldersee understood that the conduct of the conquerors was unbecoming: their soldiery was idle and bored, venereal disease was rampant, and after looting was curtailed, the rank-and-file remained gullible enough to be swindled with "Chinese art" of all descriptions. At the end of the campaign he hastened his return to Germany. In 1901, for his "accomplishments in the interest of world peace," he was named an honorary citizen of Hamburg, his erstwhile home. Again at Hanover, he resumed the duties of inspector-general, which he performed almost until his death in 1904 at age 71. He died on 5 March at 8 o'clock in the evening.

== Honours and awards ==
German orders and decorations

- Prussia:
  - Knight of Honour of the Johanniter Order, 1865; Knight of Justice, 1876
  - Knight of the Red Eagle, 4th Class with Swords, 1866; 2nd Class with Oak Leaves and Swords on Ring, 1874; with Star, 7 September 1881; Grand Cross, 27 January 1889
  - Iron Cross (1870), 1st Class
  - Knight's Cross of the Royal House Order of Hohenzollern, with Swords, 16 June 1871; Grand Commander's Cross with Swords on Ring, 27 January 1891
  - Knight of the Prussian Crown, 1st Class, 22 March 1884
  - Knight of the Black Eagle, 1 January 1895; with Collar and in Diamonds, 27 April 1900
  - Pour le Mérite (military) with Oak leaves, 8 August 1901 – upon his return to Germany from his posting in China
- (Duchy of Anhalt) Anhalt: Commander of Albert the Bear, 1st Class, 1878; Grand Cross, 1886
- Baden:
  - Knight of the Military Karl-Friedrich Merit Order, 1870
  - Knight of the House Order of Fidelity, 1897
- Bavaria:
  - Grand Commander of Merit of the Bavarian Crown, 1879
  - Knight of St. Hubert, 1901
  - Grand Cross of the Military Merit Order, with Swords, 16 May 1902
- Brunswick: Grand Cross of Henry the Lion, with Swords, 1882
- (Saxe-Coburg and Gotha) (Duchy of Saxe-Altenburg) (Saxe-Meiningen) Ernestine duchies: Grand Cross of the Saxe-Ernestine House Order
- Hesse and by Rhine: Grand Cross of the Ludwig Order, 21 September 1889
- Mecklenburg:
  - Grand Cross of the Wendish Crown, with Golden Crown
  - Military Merit Cross, 1st Class (Schwerin)
- Oldenburg: Grand Cross of the Order of Duke Peter Friedrich Ludwig, with Golden Crown and Swords
- Saxony:
  - Grand Cross of the Albert Order, with Golden Star, 1889
  - Knight of the Rue Crown
- Württemberg:
  - Commander of the Württemberg Crown, with Swords, 1870; Grand Cross with Swords, 1889
  - Grand Cross of the Friedrich Order, 1883
  - Grand Cross of the Military Merit Order

Foreign orders and decorations

- Austria-Hungary:
  - Commander of the Imperial Order of Leopold, 1871; Grand Cross, 1887; in Diamonds, 1889
  - Commander of the Order of Franz Joseph, with Star, 1872
  - Grand Cross of St. Stephen, 1895; in Diamonds, 1901
- French Empire: Grand Officer of the Legion of Honour
- Kingdom of Italy:
  - Grand Cross of Saints Maurice and Lazarus
  - Grand Cross of the Military Order of Savoy, October 1901
- Holy See: Grand Cross of the Order of Pope Pius IX, 3 June 1903
- Persian Empire: Order of the Lion and the Sun, 1st Class
- Russian Empire:
  - Knight of St. Anna, 1st Class, with Swords and in Diamonds
  - Knight of St. Andrew, with Swords and in Diamonds, August 1901
- United Kingdom: Honorary Grand Cross of the Bath (military), 16 August 1901

Military offices
Preceded by Count Moltke	Chief of the General Staff; 1888–1891	Succeeded by Count Schlieffen
Preceded by Eugen Anton Theophil von Podbielski	Quartermaster-General of the German Army; 27 December 1881 – 10 August 1888	Succeeded by Alfred von Schlieffen
