= Schlieffen =

German noble family from Pomerania

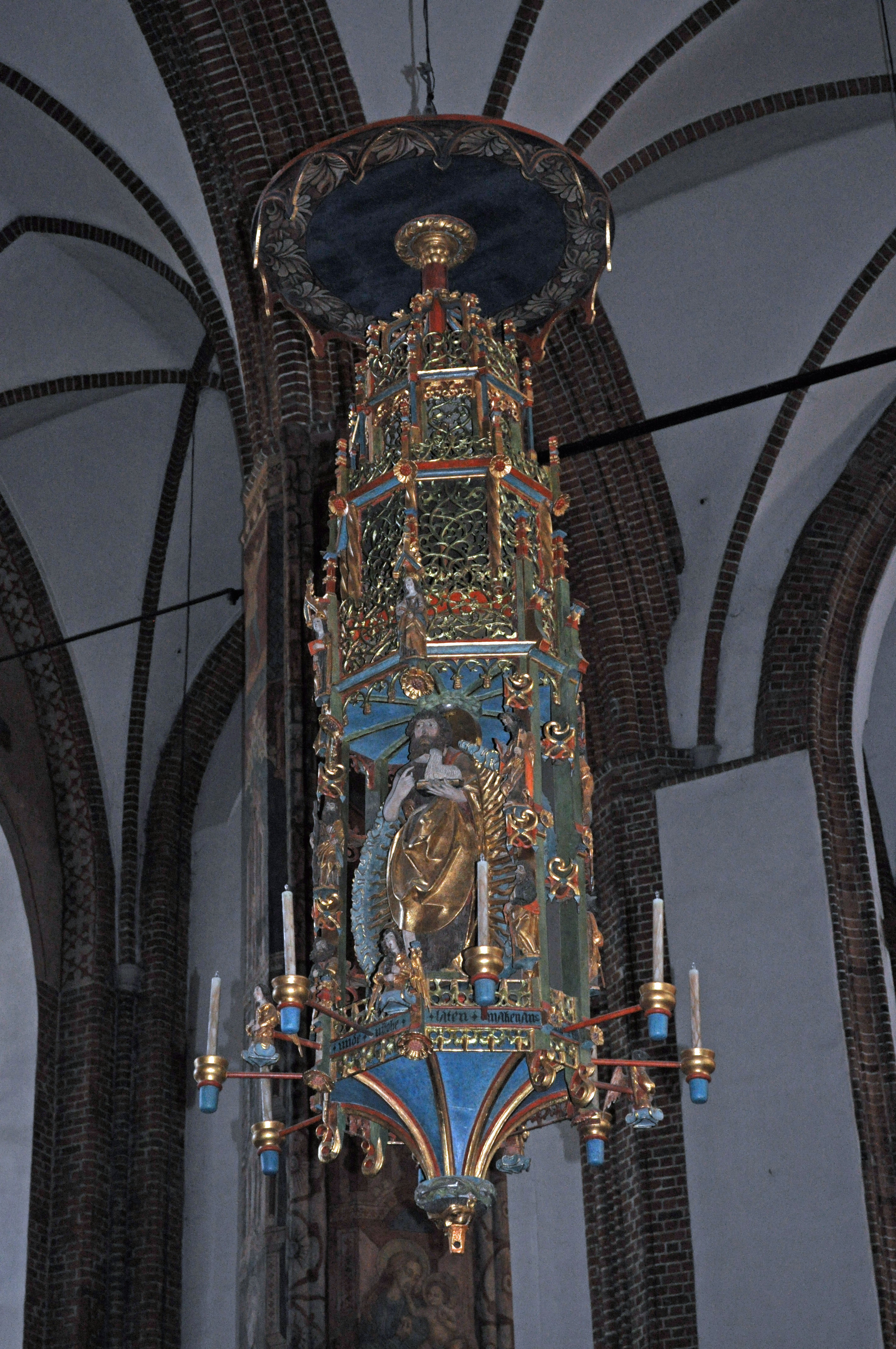
The Schlieffenkrone in Kołobrzeg (formerly Kolberg)

The Schlieffen family (or Schliefen) is the name of an old German noble family from Pomerania. The family, branches of which still exist today, originates in Kolberg.

== History ==
=== Origin ===
The family is first mentioned in records in 1365 with Henning Sleff, who died around 1376, a citizen of Kolberg. He is also the originator of the familial line.

Petrus Schleve also belonged to the family, who appears around 1200 as a Burgmann (or castellan). Another member, Gerhard, appears in 1248 as a witness. Furthermore, one Petrus Schleve was a city councillor in 1303 and 1321 in Kolberg.

=== Spread and individual lines ===
The family divided early into two branches. The founders were Hans and Nicolas, the sons of Hans Schleve the Elder. Hans Schlief the Younger was the father of the senior, Dresow branch, as well as the Dresow offshoots and the Sulechowo branch. Nicolas was the ancestor of the younger branch, and the Danzig branch.

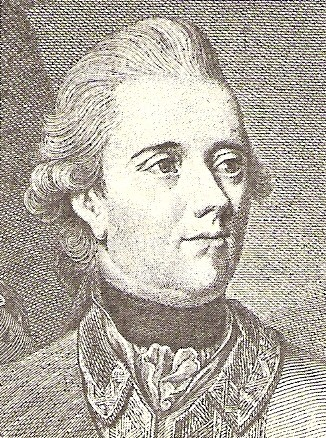
Martin Ernst von Schlieffen

The Dresow offshoot died out in 1686 with the death of Anton Wilhelm von Schlieffen. The Danzig branch died out in the early 18th century. The elder Dresow branch had in 1784 only one male descendant, Johann Friedrich Wilhelm von Schlieffen (b. 1753), a Prussian lieutenant. From the Soldekow branch, at the end of the 18th century only Johann Adolf Heinrich von Schlieffen (b. 1769) was alive.

Hans von Schlieffen the Younger left his post as councillor to King Christopher III of Denmark, Norway and Sweden and on 11 July 1444 received a Danish grant of arms at Kalmar, after he had taken the office of mayor of Kolberg. Limbrecht (or Lambertus) of the Soldekow branch, abbot of the monastery of Oliva near Danzig, and his brothers Wickbold, George and Jacob received from King Sigismund II Augustus of Poland on 19 July 1555 the Polish noble indygenat and additions to their coat of arms, at the Imperial Diet in Petrikau.

Martin Ernst von Schlieffen (born 1732) became Minister of State, commander of an infantry regiment, governor of Wesel, Knight of the Order of the Black Eagle, and Commander of the Order of the Golden Lion. He died on 15 September 1825 as a Prussian lieutenant general.

Johann Leo von Schlieffen (born 1649), son of Georg Heinrich von Schlieffen (1684–1751) and Anna von Brunswick, died in 1777 as a Prussian judge. Out of his three sons from his marriage with Dorothea Elisabeth von Fuchs, the eldest one, Heinrich Wilhelm Graf von Schlieffen (born 1756) became a Prussian Lieutenant-General of artillery and Knight of the Order of the Red Eagle, 1st Class. He died in 1842 without children. The second son, Johann Ernst Ludwig (born 1759) died on 5 December 1819 as a Prussian captain, and the youngest, Karl Friedrich Graf von Schlieffen (1763–1840), became a Prussian colonel. The house of the counts was continued in two lines by the descendants of the two younger sons. Graf Wilhelm von Schlieffen (1829–1902) came from the first line, and was the son of Graf Wilhelm Heinrich von Schlieffen (died 1836), a Prussian Major, from his marriage with Sophia von Jagow. He became the fee tail lord at Schlieffenberg, Niglewe, Tolzin, Rahden and Sierhagen in Mecklenburg, as well as Windhausen and Sensenstei in Hesse. In 1858 he married Amelie Gräfin von der Groeben. His uncle Karl Graf von Schlieffen (born 1792) was fee tail lord at Schwandt (now part of Rosenow), Marienhof and Vossfeld (also now part of Rosenow) in Mecklenburg and a Prussian lieutenant general. From his marriage to Clementine von Wedell (1801–1836) he had three daughters and four sons. His brother Leo (born 1802) became a Prussian Major and a lifetime member of the Prussian House of Lords. In 1837 he married Virginie von Schlieffen (born 1817) from the Soltikow family, the owner of the estate of Sandow in Pyritz in Pomerania. From the marriage they had four daughters and three sons.

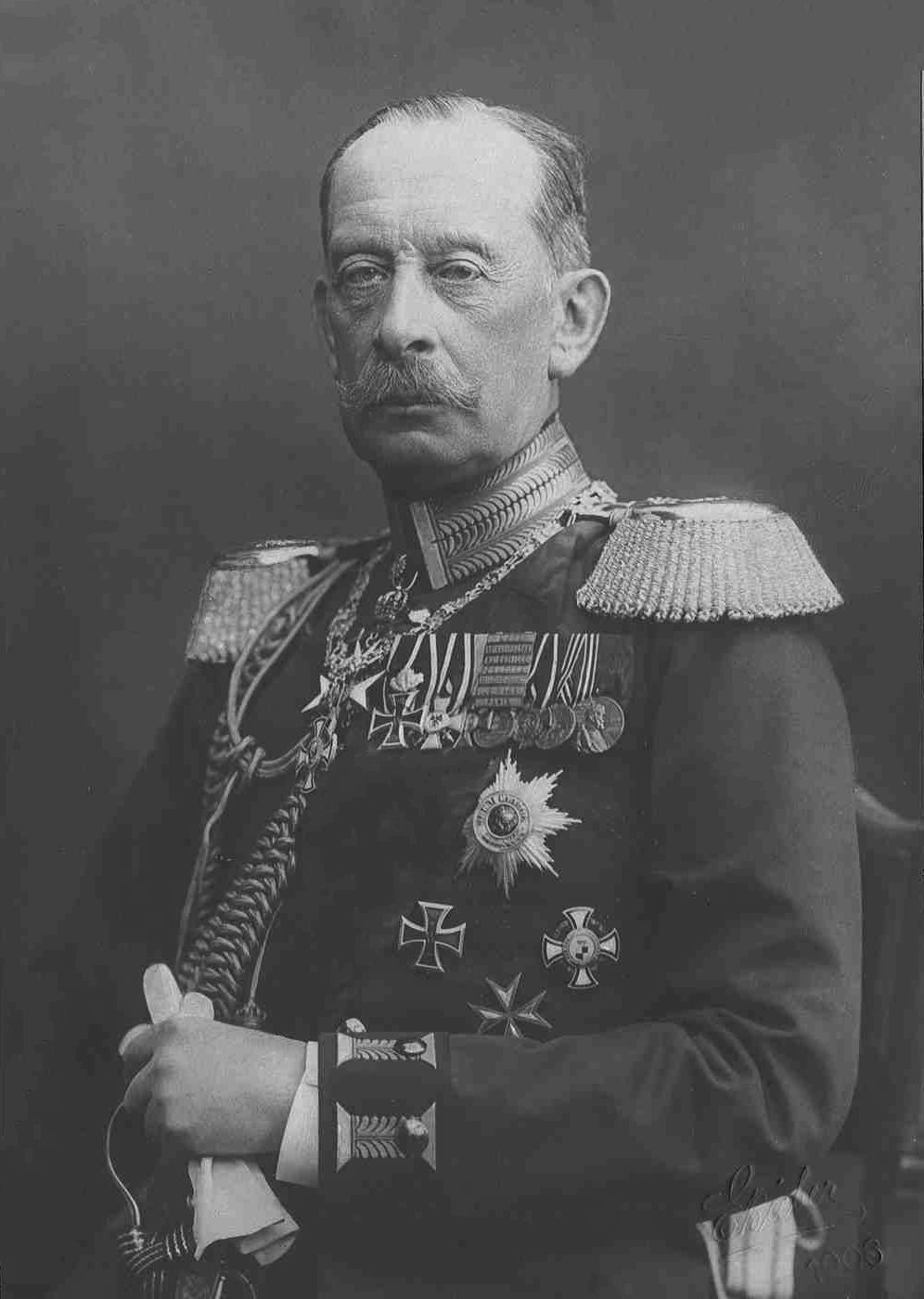
Alfred von Schlieffen in 1906

From the second comital line came Friedrich Magnus Graf von Schlieffen (born 1796), son of Graf Karl Friedrich von Schlieffen (died 1840), lord of the Herrschaft Großkrausche in Bunzlau and a Prussian major. From his 1828 marriage to Auguste von Schönberg (born 1808), he had three daughters and four sons. A daughter, countess Louise (born 1829), in 1856 married the Prussian chamberlain Friedrich Graf von und zu Egloffstein. Two of her brothers entered Prussian military service. Her father's brother Karl Graf von Schlieffen (born 1798), a Prussian lieutenant colonel, died in 1845 as a royal aide-de-camp. From his 1823 marriage to Catharina Gräfin von Schuwalow (1801–1858) he had four daughters and one son. The latter, Georg Graf von Schlieffen (born 1832), lord at Oberwitz in Upper Silesia, who became a Prussian royal valet de chambre. In 1860 he married Ludmilla Gräfin von Renart (born 1830), the widowed Countess of Brühl. His sisters, countesses Elisabeth (born 1825) and Maria (born 1830), both became honorary canonesses of the Stift zum heiligen Grab. Countess Anastasia (born 1827) married Ludwig Graf von Pappenheim in 1854. Her sister Louise (born 1838) married Maximilian Graf von Pappenheim in 1860.

A significant member of the family in modern times was Alfred Graf von Schlieffen (born 1833). He joined the Prussian army in 1854 and fought in the Austro-Prussian War and the Franco-Prussian War. In 1884 he became a department head in the German General Staff, 1888 Quartermaster-General and Deputy Chief of the General Staff. In 1905 he composed the Schlieffen Plan, which was to enable the German Empire to prevent a war on two fronts. He died a Prussian field marshal on 4 January 1913 in Berlin.

=== Peerage ===
The three brothers Wilhelm von Schlieffen, a Prussian colonel, Ludwig von Schlieffen at Czierwienz at Neitzkow in Stolp, and Karl von Schlieffen, Prussian colonel were raised to the Prussian rank of counts on 1 March 1812 in Berlin by royal decree.

== Legacy in Kolberg ==
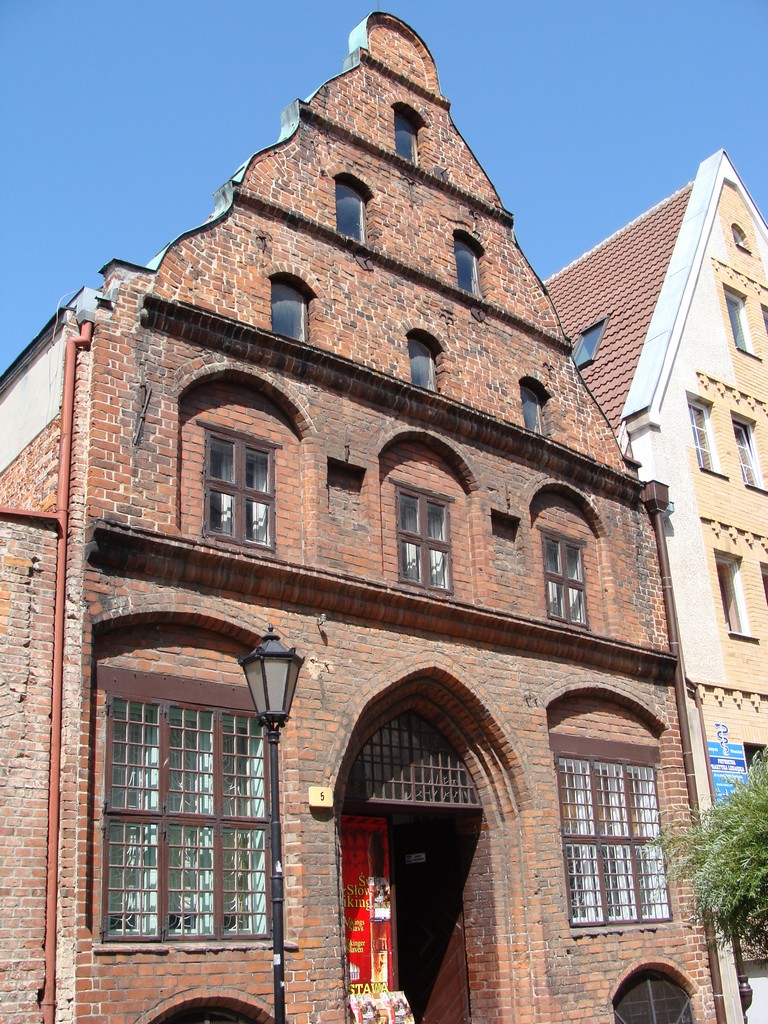
Schlieffen-House in Kołobrzeg (Kolberg)

In Kolberg cathedral, the Schlieffenkrone is a reminder of the family's influence and importance in the city, being a wooden chandelier from 1523. As in many other Hanseatic cities, such as Lübeck, the family first rose up within the bourgeoisie in the city, and then through investments and money-lending in manors and villages became part of the landed nobility. The Schlieffenkrone was saved in 1945 on the initiative of pastor Pastor Paul Hinz, because it was walled up in time.

The Dom Schlieffenów (Schlieffen house) in Kołobrzeg (Kolberg) is an originally Brick Gothic town house of the Schlieffen family from the 15th century. It was renovated in 1540 in the style of the Early Renaissance. Since the Second World War, the building holds the museum for city history.

== Members ==
- Adolph von Schlieffen (1841–1916)
- Alfred von Schlieffen (1833–1913), field marshal and author of the Schlieffen Plan
- Anton von Schlieffen (1576–1650), officer
- Arthur von Schlieffen (1844–1914), Prussian Lieutenant General
- Georg von Schlieffen-Renard (1860–1944)
- Hans Schlief (d. 1466), mayor of Kolberg
- Karl von Schlieffen (1792–1866), Prussian Lieutenant General
- Karl-Klemens von Schlieffen (1858–1934), Prussian Major General
- Katharina Gräfin von Schlieffen (born in 1956), German jurist
- Limbrecht von Schlieffen (1852–1935), Prussian General of the Cavalry
- Leo von Schlieffen (1802–1874), politician, member of the Prussian House of Lords
- Martin Ernst von Schlieffen (1732–1825), Lieutenant-General and minister in Hesse-Kassel
- Otto von Schlieffen (1821–1897), member of the German Reichstag
- Wilhelm von Schlieffen (1829–1902), member of the German Reichstag
- Wilhelm von Schlieffen (1829–1907), Prussian Major General
