= Prince Frederick of Schleswig-Holstein-Sonderburg-Augustenburg =

Prince Frederick
- Prince of Noer
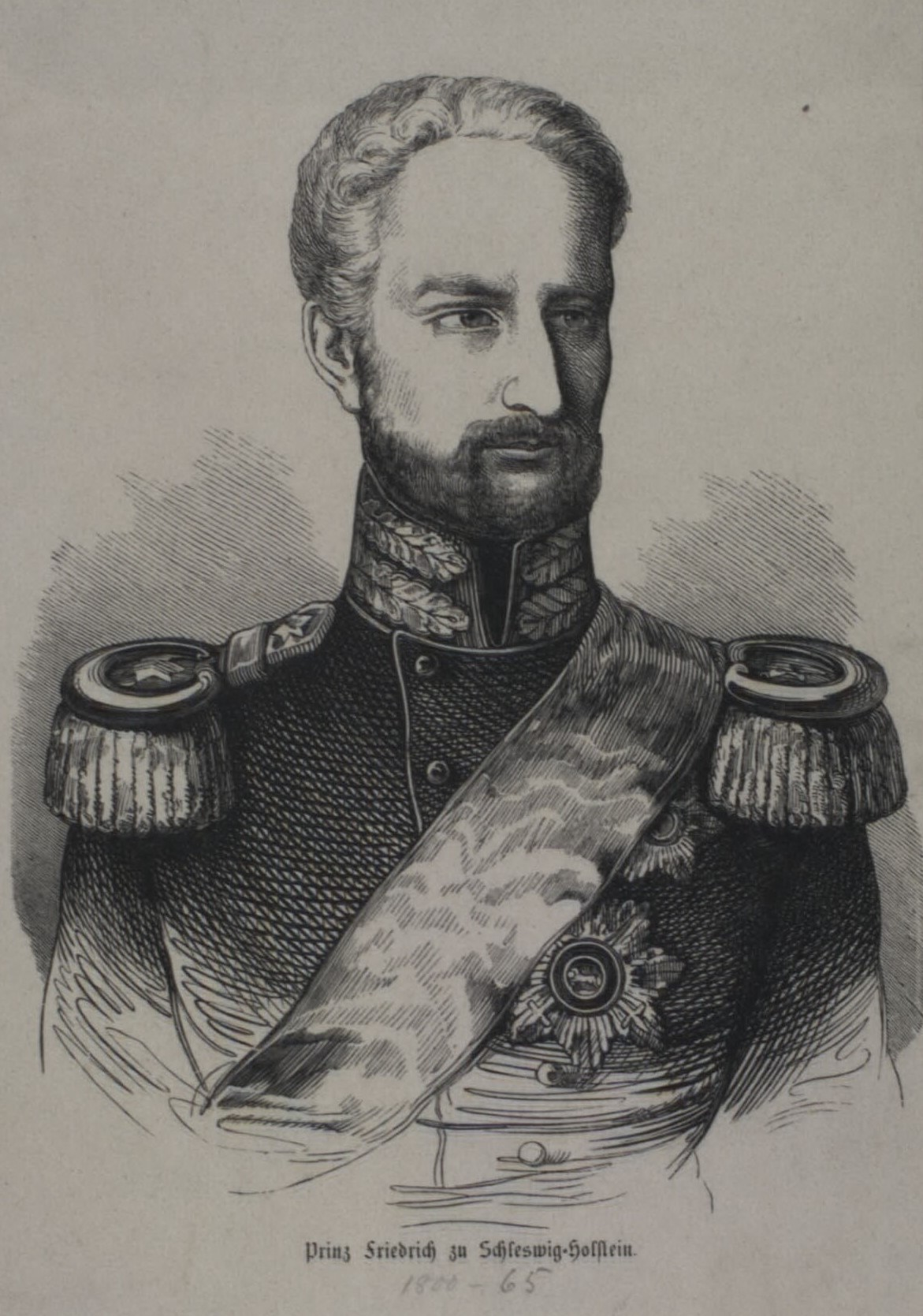
- Born: 23 August 1800; Kiel
- Died: 2 July 1865 (aged 64); Beirut, Lebanon
- Spouse: Countess Henriette Danneskjold-Samsøe (m. 1829; died 1858) Mary Esther Lee (m. 1864)
- Issue: Prince Frederick, Count of Noer; Prince Christian; Louise, Princess Michael Vlangali-Handjeri; Princess Marie
Names
- English: Frederick Emil Augustus; German: Friedrich Emil August
- House: Schleswig-Holstein-Sonderburg-Augustenburg
- Father: Frederick Christian II, Duke of Schleswig-Holstein-Sonderburg-Augustenburg
- Mother: Princess Louise Auguste of Denmark

Prince Frederick Emil August of Schleswig-Holstein-Sonderburg-Augustenburg (23 August 1800 in Kiel – 2 July 1865 in Beirut, Lebanon), usually simply known by just his first name, Frederick, Prince of Noer, was a prince of the House of Schleswig-Holstein-Sonderburg-Augustenburg and a cadet-line descendant of the Danish royal house.

He was the second and youngest son of Louise Auguste of Denmark and Frederik Christian II, Duke of Schleswig-Holstein-Sonderburg-Augustenburg. As such, he was close to succeed in the Danish throne. He was the brother-in-law of King Christian VIII and nephew of King Frederik VI. His elder brother, Christian August II, succeeded in 1814 as the Duke of Schleswig-Holstein-Sonderburg-Augustenburg.

After his second, morganatic union in 1864, he renounced the rights of succession to House of Augustenburg. He was created Prince of Noer or Nør by Emperor Franz Joseph of Austria afterwards. He died in 1865 in Beirut.

== Life ==
Frederick was the second son of Frederick Christian II, Duke of Schleswig-Holstein-Sonderburg-Augustenburg, and Louise Augusta of Denmark. In 1832, Louise Augusta purchased both the Grönwohld estate and the neighboring Noer estate for her son. At this point, he assumed the title "Prince of Noer." After the death of Prince Frederik of Hesse in 1845, son and successor of his father Prince Charles of Hesse-Kassel as governor of Schleswig-Holstein, Prince Frederick took this office.

Due to the complicated nature of succession, Frederick and his older brother, Christian August II, Duke of Schleswig-Holstein-Sonderburg-Ausgustenburg, both saw themselves as rightful heirs to the duchies, as well as the Kingdom of Denmark. The two shared a goal of achieving a united Schleswig-Holstein belonging to the German Confederation, complete with a liberal constitution.

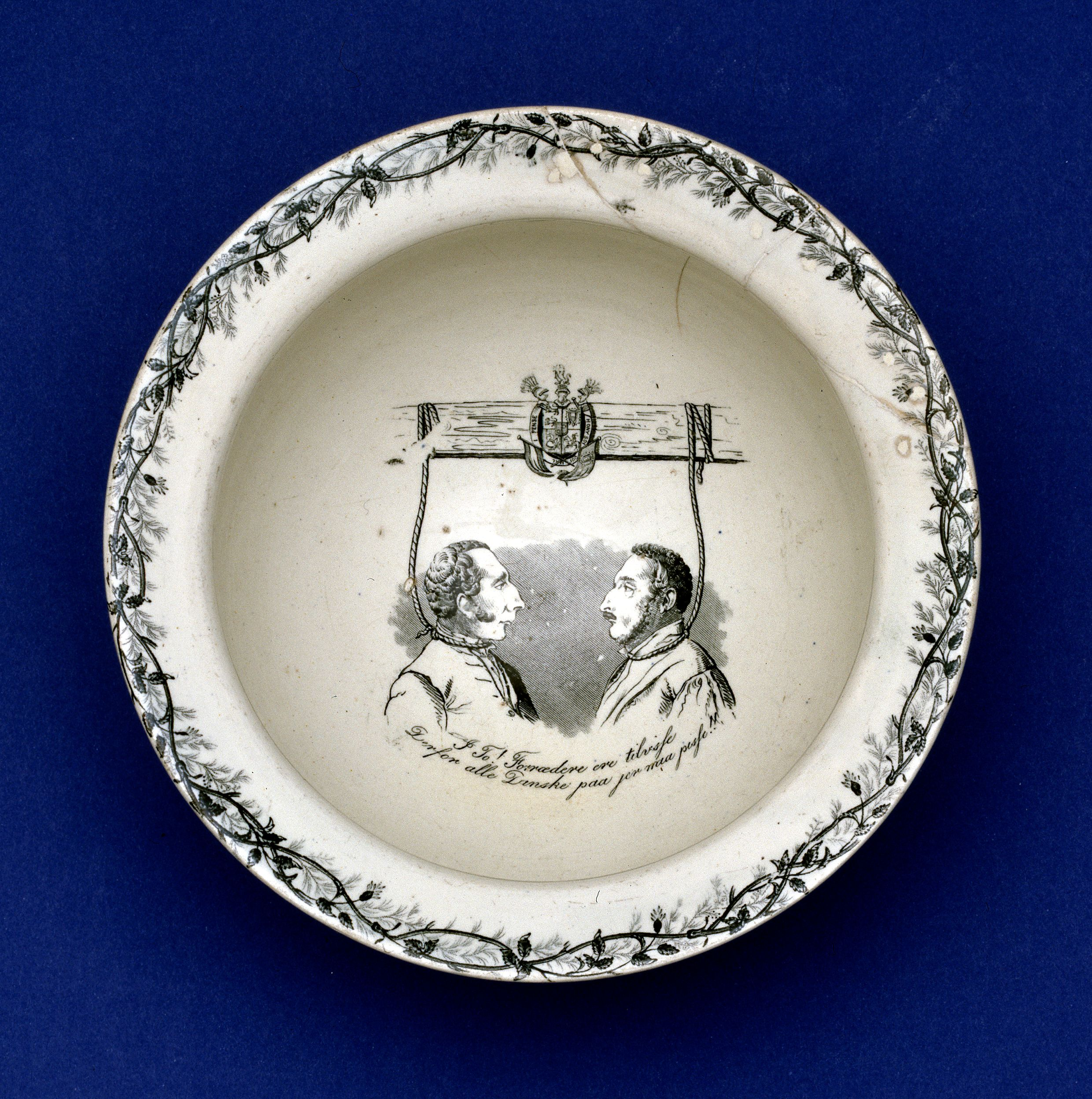
Frederik and his brother being hanged as a decoration in the bottom of a chamber pot.

In March 1848, Prince Frederick became the Minister of War in Schleswig-Holstein's provisional government, and commanded the duchies' army during the First Schleswig War until 7 April 1850. Upon Schleswig-Holstein's capitulation to Denmark, Frederick went into exile (1851) and for a time in 1852 was documented as residing in Devon, England. In Denmark, chamber pots were sold featuring a picture of Frederick at the bottom.

In 1864, after the Kingdom of Prussia and the German Confederation had, under the Austrian Empire's leadership, defeated Denmark in the Second Schleswig War, Frederick was reassigned the title of "Prince of Noer" by decree of Emperor Franz Joseph I of Austria.

Prince Frederick and his first wife are buried in Krusendorf.

== Marriage and issue ==
Frederick married on 17 September 1829, at Augustenburg, his second cousin Countess Henriette Danneskjold-Samsøe (9 May 1806 - 10 September 1858) who was a Danish noblewoman and great-great-great-granddaughter of Christian V of Denmark, belonging to an illegitimate branch of the House of Oldenburg. His brother had married his wife's elder sister nine years previous. They had four children:

1. Prince Frederick Christian Charles August of Schleswig-Holstein-Sonderburg-Augustenburg (23 August 1830 - 25 December 1881), married in 1870 Carmelita Eisenblat (21 August 1848 - 11 August 1912) and took the title Count of Noer. They had two daughters.
2. Prince Christian of Schleswig-Holstein-Sonderburg-Augustenburg (13 December 1832 - 3 February 1834), died young
3. Princess Louise Caroline Henriette Auguste of Schleswig-Holstein-Sonderburg-Augustenburg (29 July 1836 - 25 September 1866), married in 1865 Prince Michael Vlangali-Handjeri (c. 1833 - 11 August 1911), a maternal grandson of Alexander Handjeri and relative of the conservative politician Nicolaus Handjery. They had a son - Karl von Vlangali-Handjery, Prinz (July 28, 1866 - 01 November 1933).
4. Princess Marie of Schleswig-Holstein-Sonderburg-Augustenburg (8 August 1838 - 3 February 1839), died young

After Henriette's death, Frederick married morganatically on 3 November 1864, at Paris, Mary Esther Lee (3 October 1837 - 4 July 1914), the third daughter of David Lee, a New York merchant. It was reported that during their extended honeymoon, Friedrich was so taken by his second wife that he left her his entire fortune, only to pass away soon afterward, variously on 2 or 5 July 1865 in Beirut. His body was brought back to Krusendorf in Schleswig for inhumation in the family vault. The two were childless. Eight years after the death of her first husband, the Princess married Count Alfred von Waldersee, a General who was later created Field Marshal.

== Ancestry ==
Ancestors of Prince Frederick of Schleswig-Holstein-Sonderburg-Augustenburg

16. Prince Frederick William of Schleswig-Holstein-Sonderburg-Augustenburg
8. Christian August I, Duke of Schleswig-Holstein-Sonderburg-Augustenburg
17. Countess Sofie Amalie of Ahlefeld
4. Frederick Christian I, Duke of Schleswig-Holstein-Sonderburg-Augustenburg
18. Christian Gyldenlove, Count of Danneskiöld-Samsöe
9. Countess Frederikke Louise of Danneskiöld-Samsöe
19. Countess Charlotte Amalie of Danneskjöld-Laurvig
2. Frederick Christian II, Duke of Schleswig-Holstein-Sonderburg-Augustenburg
20. Christian Charles, Duke of Schleswig-Holstein-Sonderburg-Plön
10. Frederick Charles, Duke of Schleswig-Holstein-Sonderburg-Plön
21. Countess Dorothea Christine of Aichelberg
5. Princess Charlotte of Schleswig-Holstein-Sonderburg-Plön
22. Christian Detlev, Count of Reventlow
11. Countess Christiane Irmgard of Reventlow
23. Benedicte Margrethe Brockdorff
1. Frederick of Schleswig-Holstein-Sonderburg-Augustenburg, Prince of Noer
24. Christian VI of Denmark
12. Frederick V of Denmark
25. Margravine Sophia Magdalen of Brandenburg-Kulmbach
6. Christian VII of Denmark
26. George II of Great Britain
13. Princess Louise of Great Britain
27. Margravine Caroline of Brandenburg-Ansbach
3. Princess Louise Auguste of Denmark
28. George II of Great Britain (= 26)
14. Frederick, Prince of Wales
29. Margravine Caroline of Brandenburg-Ansbach (= 27)
7. Princess Caroline Matilda of Great Britain
30. Frederick II, Duke of Saxe-Gotha-Altenburg
15. Princess Augusta of Saxe-Gotha
31. Princess Magdalena Augusta of Anhalt-Zerbst
