= Princess Louise Augusta of Denmark =

Louise Augusta of Denmark and Norway
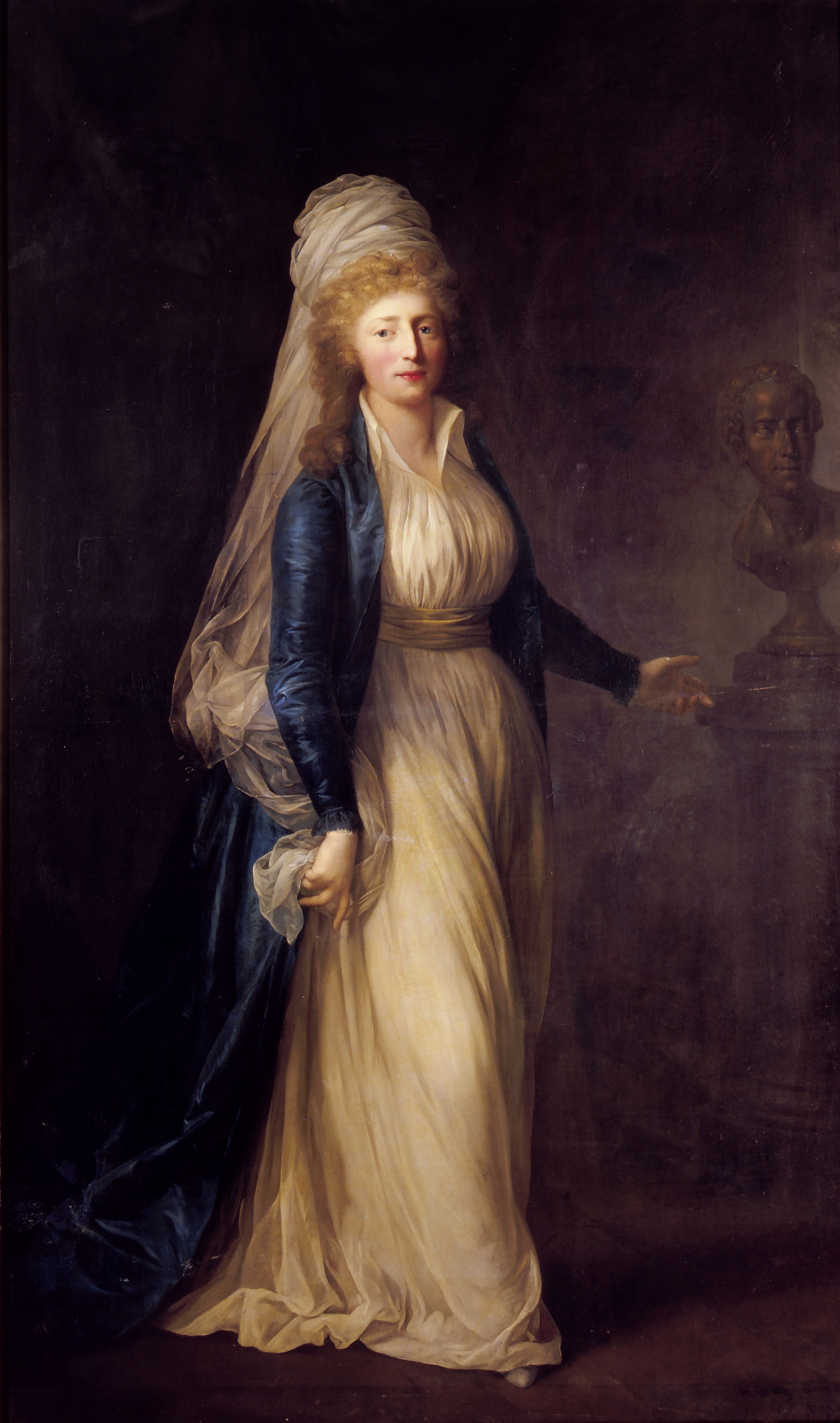
- Portrait by Anton Graff, 1791

Duchess consort of Schleswig-Holstein-Sonderburg-Augustenburg
- Tenure: 13 November 1794 – 14 June 1814
- Born: 7 July 1771; Hirschholm Palace, Hørsholm, Denmark
- Died: 13 January 1843 (aged 71); Augustenborg Palace, Augustenborg, Denmark
- Burial: Sønderborg Castle
- Spouse: Frederick Christian II, Duke of Schleswig-Holstein-Sonderburg-Augustenburg (m. 1786)
- Issue: Caroline Amalie, Queen of Denmark; Christian August II, Duke of Schleswig-Holstein-Sonderburg-Augustenburg; Frederick, Prince of Noer
- House: Oldenburg
- Father: Christian VII of Denmark
- Mother: Caroline Matilda of Great Britain

Louise Augusta of Denmark and Norway (7 July 1771 – 13 January 1843) was the daughter of the Queen of Denmark–Norway, Caroline Matilda of Great Britain and King Christian VII. Johann Friedrich Struensee, the king's royal physician and de facto regent of the country at the time of her birth. She was referred to sometimes as "la petite Struensee"; this did not, however, have any effect on her position.

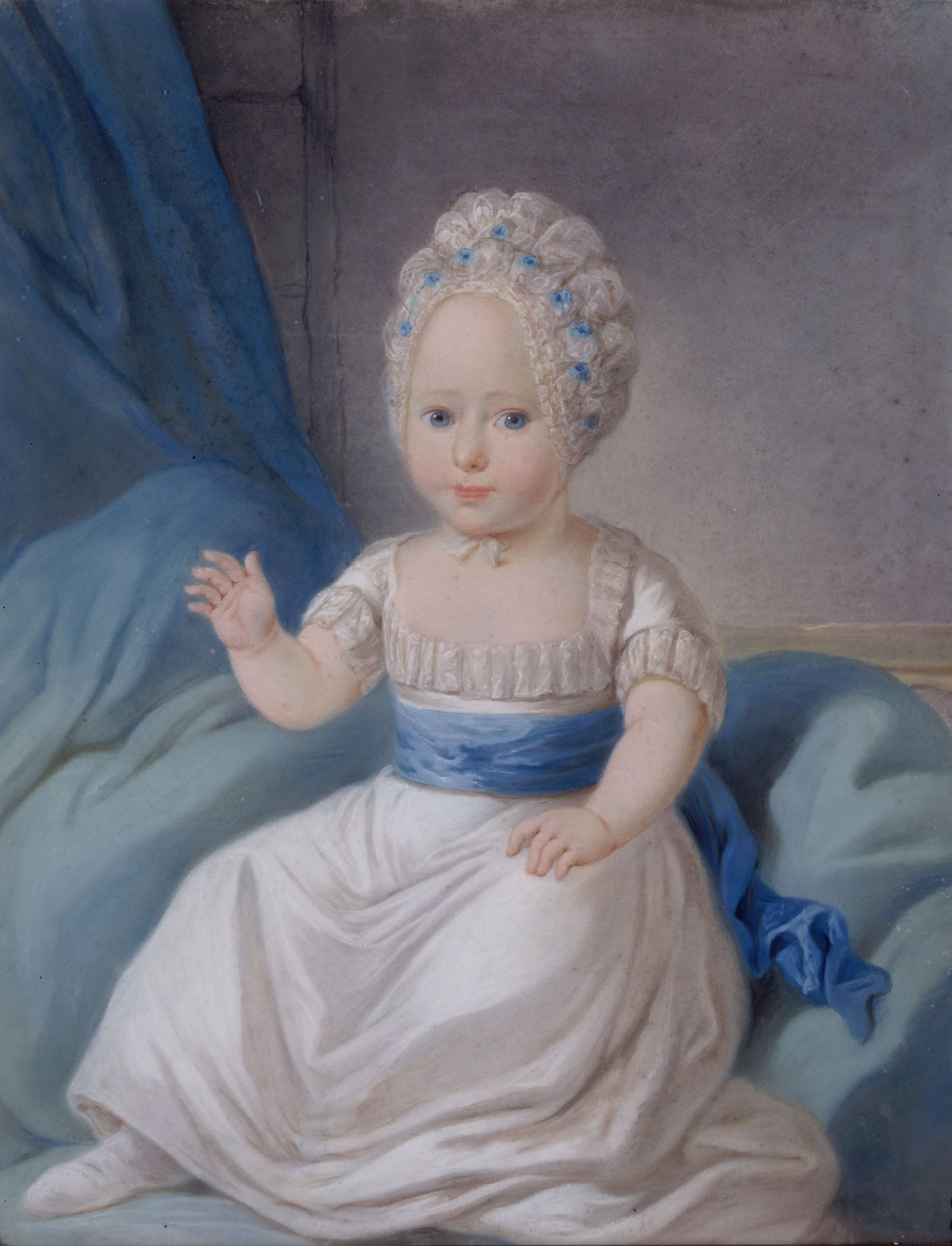
Portrait of Princess Louise Auguste as a child. Pastel by H.P. Sturz, 1771. In the collection of Rosenborg Castle, Denmark.

== Early life ==
She was born at Hirschholm Palace in present-day Hørsholm municipality, Denmark. After the arrest of Struensee and Queen Caroline Matilda on 17 January 1772 and the subsequent execution of Struensee and the banishment and imprisonment of her mother, she was raised at the Danish court residing at Christiansborg Palace, Copenhagen along with her four-year-old brother, Crown Prince Frederick, under the supervision of Juliana Maria of Brunswick-Wolfenbüttel. Louise Augusta and her brother had a very close relationship their entire lives, and it was at his request that she agreed to marry, despite the fact that she had no enthusiasm for the match. She was her brother's closest friend, and he developed a strong resentment toward Queen Juliana Maria when she tried to separate them.

== Marriage ==
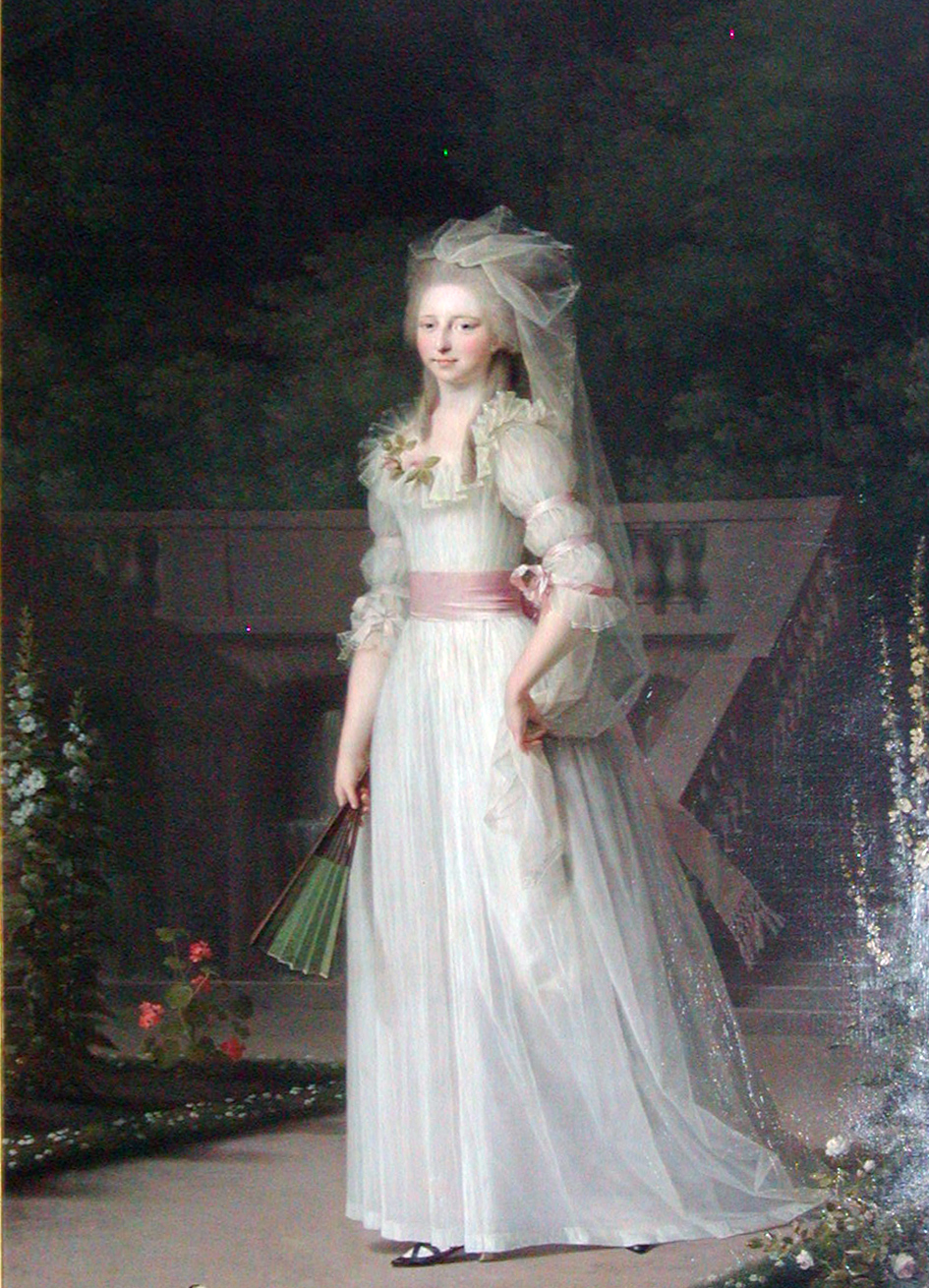
Portrait of Louise Auguste in 1787 by Jens Juel.

In February 1779 the nation's foremost statesman, Chief Minister Andreas Peter Bernstorff, hatched an ingenious plan for the young princess. Since a son of hers could one day ascend the throne, it would be advantageous to arrange a marriage early, and to marry the "half-royal" back into the family, to the Hereditary Prince of Augustenborg. This plan not only had the positive effect of more closely connecting the Danish royal house's two lines, the ruling House of Oldenborg and the offshoot House of Augustenborg, thus discouraging the threat of a breakup of the kingdom, but also the prevention of her marriage into the Swedish royal house.

Her future spouse was a prince with an exceptionally high concentration of recent Danish ancestors. He was closely related to all important families of the then high nobility of Denmark. The binding agreements were made a year later, and in spring 1785 the 20-year-old Duke Frederick Christian II came to Copenhagen. The engagement was announced then, and a year later, on 27 May 1786 the 14-year-old Louise Augusta was married at Christiansborg Palace.

== Life at the Danish court ==
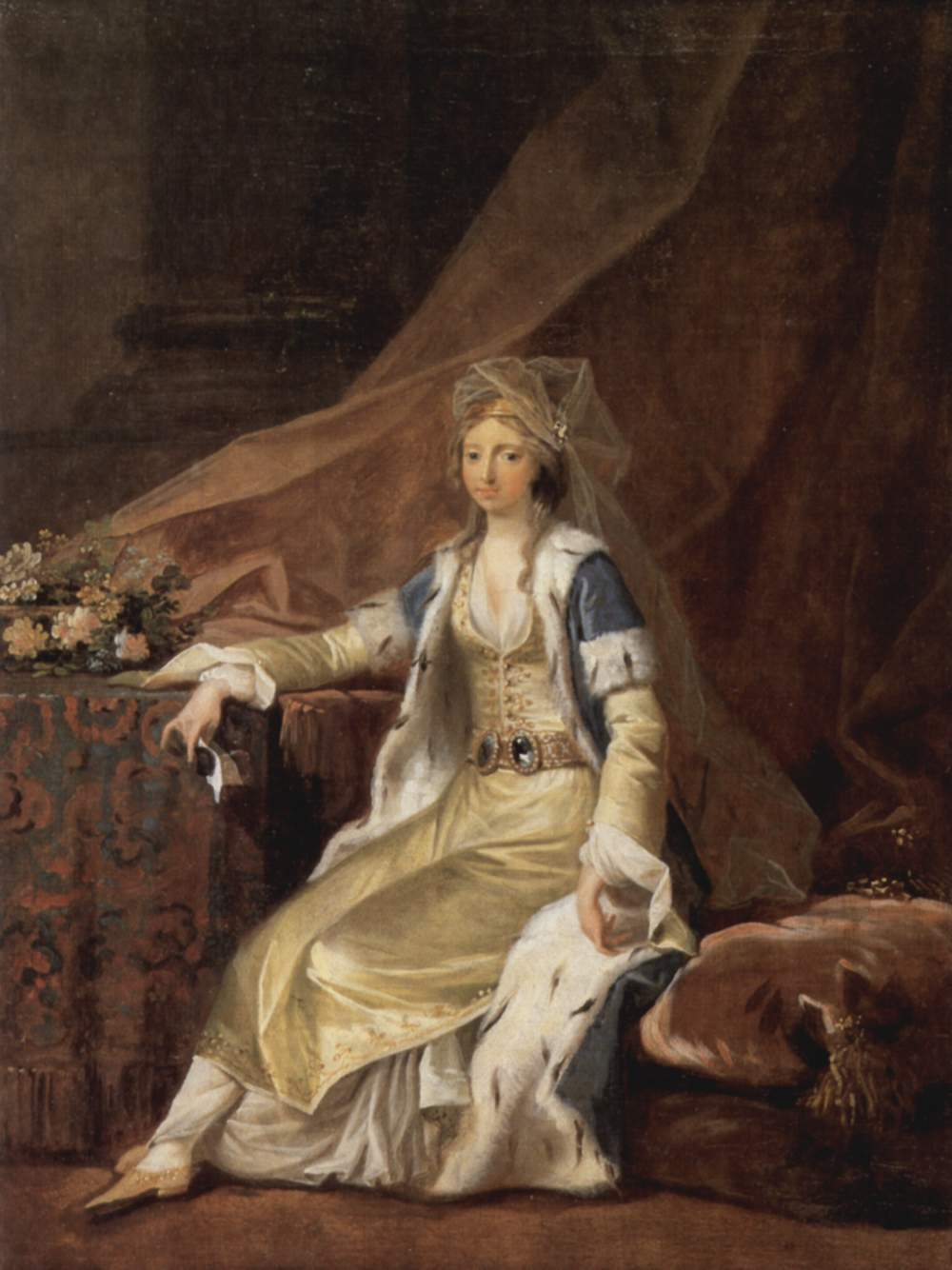
The Duchess in Turkish garment portrayed by Juel

Louise Augusta and Frederick Christian II were dissimilar: while she was extroverted, lively, beautiful, and pleasure-loving, her husband was unattractive, serious, and interested in philosophy and politics. But they fell in love with each other.

Louise Augusta felt sympathy for the French Revolution and had therefore anti-British views from 1789 onward. She and her husband lived together at the Danish court in Copenhagen for many years, until in 1794 came the Christiansborg Palace fire and the death of Frederick Christian I, Duke of Augustenborg, when her husband inherited the Duchy and estates. The princess was often the center of court activities and was proclaimed the “Venus of Denmark”; she was the real female center of the Danish royal court, even after her brother's marriage in 1790. After 1794, she and her husband lived during the summer on the island of Als and at Gråsten. They lived in Jutland in the winters and at Augustenborg Palace during the summers, where she held a lively court, where artists, such as the poet Jens Baggesen, were among her admirers.

== Later life ==
Over the years conflict developed between her husband and her brother, especially over the relationship of the double-duchies of Schleswig-Holstein and his small appanage around Sonderborg on one hand and the Danish monarchy on the other. She remained loyal to the Danish Royal House or rather, to her brother, throughout the differences, and acted as his agent with her spouse. In 1810 she worked actively to stop the Duke's attempts to be chosen as successor to the Swedish throne, which were linked with the duke's younger brother Charles August of Augustenburg becoming chosen by Swedes and then dying, after which Jean-Baptiste Bernadotte, Marshal of France and Prince of Ponte Corvo, was elected.

Their relationship eventually fell apart, and Frederik Christian tried to legally limit her influence over their children's future. He died on 14 June 1814, and Louise Augusta took control of the Augustenborg estates and the children's upbringing. The estate was turned over to the eldest son, Christian August, on his return from an extended foreign tour in 1820. From then on she resided in the Augustenborg Castle, where she established an eccentric court. In 1832 in order to give her youngest son, Frederik Emil August, better income possibilities she purchased the estate Nør and Grønwald in Dänischwold near Ekernførde Fjord in South Schleswig. She had a close and warm relationship with her daughter and her son-in-law, but her relationship to her sons was tense.

She died at Augustenborg in 1843, when her brother's reign in Denmark had already ended and Christian VIII, her son-in-law, ascended - she thus died as the mother of the then Queen of Denmark.

== Louise Augusta in culture and legacy ==
Two portraits of her were painted by Danish artist Jens Juel. The first from 1784 is in Royal Collection, London, and the second from 1787 is in the Frederiksborg Palace Museum. Another portrait of her by Anton Graff is in Sønderborg Castle.

Danish author Maria Helleberg has written a best-selling historical novel based on the life of Louise Augusta called "Kærlighedsbarn" ("Love Child"), which inspired a special biographical exhibition on the life of the princess at Rosenborg Castle.

She is a minor character in The Lost Queen by Norah Lofts, a historical novel about the life of her mother, Caroline Matilda of Great Britain.

Fort Augustaborg in Ghana was named after her.

Fort Louise Augusta a battery near Christiansted, St. Croix, United States Virgin Islands is named for her.

== Issue ==
- Caroline Amalie (28 June 1796 – 9 March 1881), who would become Queen of Denmark as consort to Christian VIII
- Christian August (19 July 1798 – 11 March 1869), the Duke of Holstein-Sonderburg-Augustenburg (who was to become a pivotal figure in the Question of Schleswig-Holstein in the 1850s and 1860s). In order to hold to potential Danish feelings, he was married to a Danish relative, Countess of Danneskjold-Samsoe.
- Frederik Emil August (23 August 1800 – 2 July 1865), the “Prince” of Nør (Noer)

== Ancestry ==
Ancestors of Princess Louise Augusta of Denmark

8. Christian VI of Denmark
4. Frederick V of Denmark
9. Sophie Magdalene of Kulmbach
2. Christian VII of Denmark
10. George II of Great Britain
5. Louise of Great Britain
11. Caroline of Ansbach
1. Louise Augusta of Denmark
12. George II of Great Britain (= 10)
6. Frederick, Prince of Wales
13. Caroline of Ansbach (= 11)
3. Caroline Matilda of Great Britain
14. Frederick II, Duke of Saxe-Gotha-Altenburg
7. Augusta of Saxe-Gotha
15. Magdalena Augusta of Anhalt-Zerbst
