= Noer, Schleswig-Holstein =

Noer Nør
- Municipality
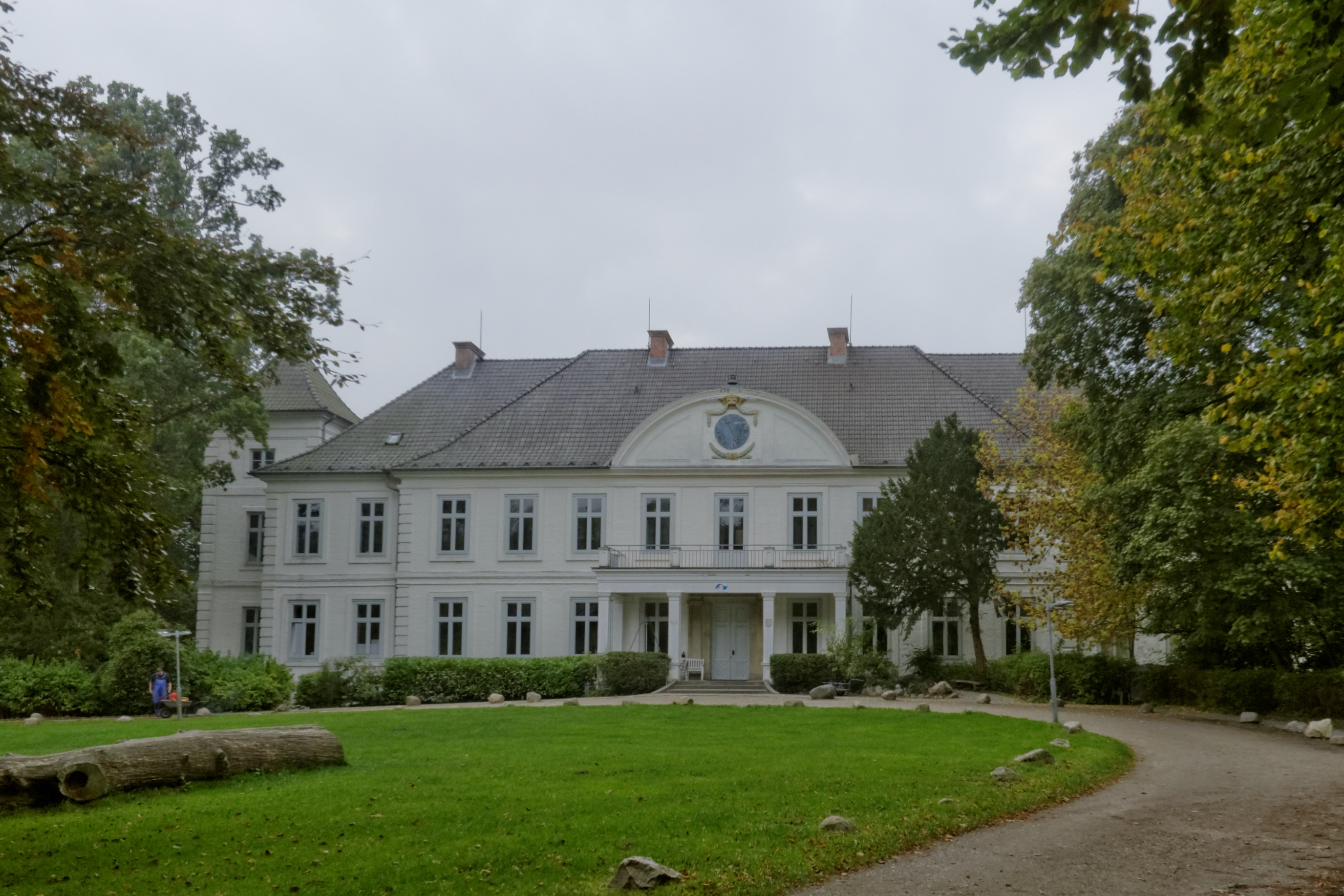

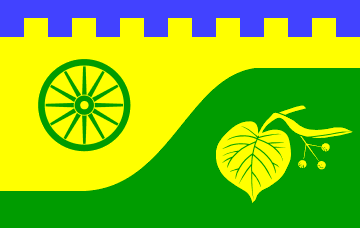
- Flag Coat of arms

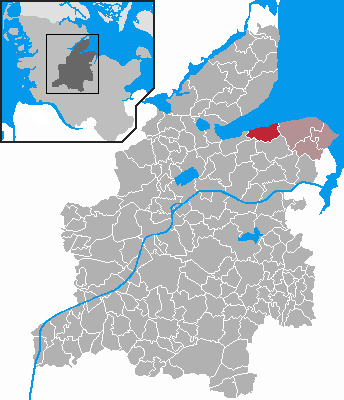
- Location of Noer; Nør within Rendsburg-Eckernförde district
- Interactive map of Noer; Nør
- Location within Germany Location within Schleswig-Holstein
- Coordinates: 54°28′N 10°0′E
- Country: Germany
- State: Schleswig-Holstein
- District: Rendsburg-Eckernförde
- Municipal assoc.: Dänischenhagen

Government
  - Mayor: Marlies Mißfeldt

Area
  - Total: 13.89 km^{2} (5.36 sq mi)
- Elevation: 29 m (95 ft)

Population (2025-12-31)
  - Total: 834
  - Density: 60.0/km^{2} (156/sq mi)
- Time zone: UTC+01:00 (CET)
  - Summer (DST): UTC+02:00 (CEST)
- Postal codes: 24214
- Dialling codes: 04346
- Vehicle registration: RD
- Website: www.amt- daenischenhagen.de

Noer (German pronunciation: [nøːɐ̯]; Danish: Nør) is a municipality in the district of Rendsburg-Eckernförde, in Schleswig-Holstein, Germany.

== See also ==
- Prince Frederick of Schleswig-Holstein-Sonderburg-Augustenburg
