= Charles Edward, Duke of Saxe-Coburg and Gotha =

Nazi politician (1884–1954)

Charles Edward
- Duke of Albany
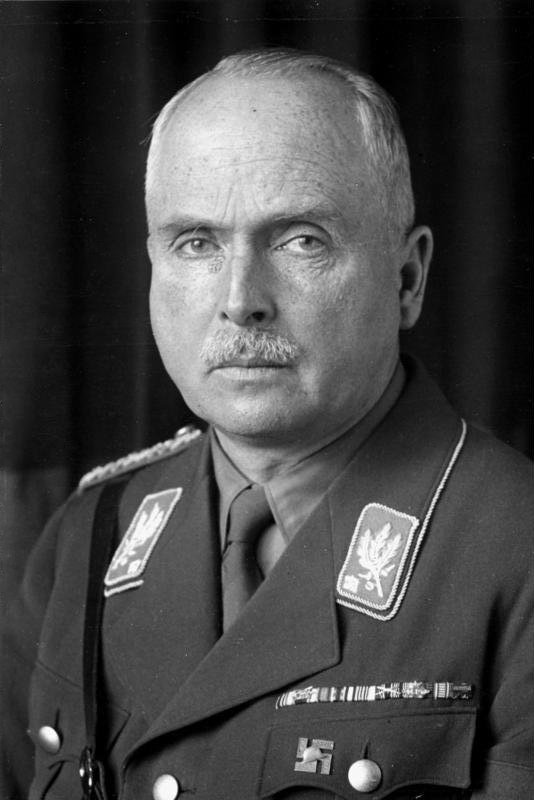
- Charles Edward as SA-Obergruppenführer

Duke of Saxe-Coburg and Gotha
- Reign: 30 July 1900 – 14 November 1918
- Predecessor: Alfred
- Successor: Monarchy abolished
- Regent: Ernst of Hohenlohe-Langenburg (1900–1905)
- Born: Prince Charles Edward, Duke of Albany; 19 July 1884; Claremont, Surrey, England
- Died: 6 March 1954 (aged 69); Coburg, Bavaria, West Germany
- Spouse: Princess Victoria Adelaide of Schleswig-Holstein (m. 1905)
- Issue: Prince Johann Leopold; Princess Sibylla of Sweden, Duchess of Västerbotten; Prince Hubertus; Princess Caroline Mathilde; Prince Friedrich Josias
Names
- Leopold Charles Edward George Albert
- House: Saxe-Coburg and Gotha
- Father: Prince Leopold, Duke of Albany
- Mother: Princess Helen of Waldeck and Pyrmont
- Military career
- Allegiance: German Empire (1900–1918)
- Branch: German Army
- Rank: Colonel-in-Chief

President of the German Red Cross
- In office 1 December 1933 – 1945
- Preceded by: Joachim von Winterfeldt-Menkin
- Succeeded by: Otto Gessler

Member of the Reichstag
- In office 1936–1945

Personal details
- Party: Nazi (1933–1945)

Charles Edward (Leopold Charles Edward George Albert; (Note: He used the German language version of his name (German: Leopold Carl Eduard Georg Albert Herzog von Sachsen-Coburg und Gotha) in Germany. Before the abolition of titles of nobility in Germany by the Weimar Constitution in 1919 Herzog was a title, rather than part of his name. This article uses the English language version of his name throughout.) 19 July 1884 – 6 March 1954) was at various points in his life a British prince and royal duke, a German duke, and a Nazi politician. He was the last ruling Duke of Saxe-Coburg and Gotha, a state of the German Empire, from 30 July 1900 to 14 November 1918. He later held multiple positions in the Nazi regime, including leader of the German Red Cross, and acted as an unofficial diplomat for the German government.

Charles Edward's parents were Prince Leopold, Duke of Albany, and Princess Helen of Waldeck and Pyrmont. His paternal grandparents were Queen Victoria of the United Kingdom and Prince Albert of Saxe-Coburg and Gotha. Prince Leopold died before his son's birth. Charles Edward was born in Surrey, England, and brought up as a British prince. He was a sickly child who developed a close relationship with his grandmother and his only sibling, Alice. He was privately educated, including at Eton College. In 1899, Charles Edward was selected to succeed to the throne of Saxe-Coburg and Gotha because he was deemed young enough to be re-educated as a German. He moved to Germany at the age of 15. Between 1899 and 1905, he was put through various forms of education, guided by his cousin, German Emperor Wilhelm II.

Charles Edward ascended the ducal throne in 1900 but reigned through a regency until 1905. In 1905, he married Princess Victoria Adelaide of Schleswig-Holstein. The couple had five children, including Sibylla, the mother of King Carl XVI Gustaf of Sweden. The Duke was a conservative ruler with an interest in art and technology. He tried to emphasise his loyalty to his adopted country through various symbolic gestures. Still, his continued close association with the United Kingdom was off-putting both to his subjects and to the German elite. He chose to support the German Empire during the First World War. He was deposed during the German revolution like the other German princes. He also lost his British titles as a result of his decision to side against the British Empire.

During the 1920s, Charles Edward became a moral and financial supporter of violent far-right paramilitary groups in Germany. By the early 1930s, he was supporting the Nazi Party and joined it in 1933. He helped to promote eugenicist ideas which provided a basis for the murder of many disabled people. He was involved in attempting to shift opinion among the British upper class in a more pro-German direction. His attitudes became more pro-Nazi during the Second World War, though it is unclear how much of a political role he played. After the war, he was interned for a period and was given a minor conviction by a denazification court. He died of cancer in 1954.

== Early life in Britain ==
=== Birth and family ===
Charles Edward's father was Prince Leopold, Duke of Albany, the youngest son of the reigning British monarch, Queen Victoria. Historian Karina Urbach described Leopold as "the most intellectual of Queen Victoria's children". His mother, Princess Helen, Duchess of Albany, was the daughter of the ruling prince of Waldeck and Pyrmont, George Victor, and the sister of Queen Emma of the Netherlands. Royal biographer Theo Aronson described her as a "capable, conscientious" woman, and a devout Christian. Leopold, who suffered from haemophilia, died after slipping and hitting his head, several months before Charles Edward was born. The unborn child was not at risk of haemophilia, as the condition cannot be passed from father to son. He succeeded to his deceased father's titles at birth and was styled His Royal Highness the Duke of Albany. In addition to being the Duke of Albany, he was also the Earl of Clarence and Baron Arklow.

Leopold Charles Edward George Albert was born on 19 July 1884 at Claremont House near Esher, Surrey. He used the name Charles Edward. Leopold had wanted his firstborn son to be named after Charles Edward Stuart, an 18th-century claimant to the British throne. The infant was privately baptised at Claremont on 4 August after he fell ill. His baptism was publicly certified at St George's Church, Esher, on 4 December. Charles Edward was brought up as a prince of the United Kingdom for the first 15 years of his life. He had a sister, Alice, who was a year and a half older. Being an intensely anxious child, he often looked to Alice for support, a habit that continued throughout his adulthood. The siblings were nicknamed "Siamese twins".

Throughout the 18th and 19th centuries, the British royal family had developed close familial relationships with continental Protestant, and particularly German, reigning families. Queen Victoria's immediate family belonged to the House of Saxe-Coburg and Gotha; her deceased husband, Prince Albert, was the younger brother of the childless Duke Ernest II. Ernest governed the Duchy of Saxe-Coburg and Gotha, one of the states in the German Empire, which had a federal system of government . Victoria and Albert's eldest daughter, Victoria, German Empress, was the mother of German Emperor Wilhelm II. Victoria and Albert's eldest son, Prince Albert Edward, was the heir apparent to the British throne. Thus it was their second son, Prince Alfred, who succeeded his uncle Ernest II in 1893. Aronson commented on a painting of the family commissioned to commemorate Queen Victoria's Golden Jubilee in 1887:

To each other, these impressive-looking figures might be known by such arch nicknames as Ducky or Mossie or Sossie, but among the group were a host of future kings, queens, emperors and empresses. In time, these direct descendants of Queen Victoria would sit on no less than ten European thrones. With good reason was the old Queen known as the 'Grandmama of Europe'. And in an age when it was still widely believed that monarchs were as important as they looked, it would be only natural ... [for a child to assume it was] the most powerful clan on earth.

Charles Edward, his mother, and his sister were surrounded by members of the wider royal family in proximity to Queen Victoria. They frequently spent time with the Queen at her various estates. Charles Edward was described as Victoria's favourite grandchild. The boy and his sister often visited Balmoral Castle where they prepared for their future positions. Victoria enjoyed her grandchildren acting out dramatic scenes which reflected the religious values she wanted to inculcate in them. Lewis Carroll, a family friend, described Charles Edward as a "perfect little prince" who was well-trained in court etiquette and ceremony. Princess Helen also took her children on visits to her relatives in Germany and the Netherlands.

=== Upbringing and education ===
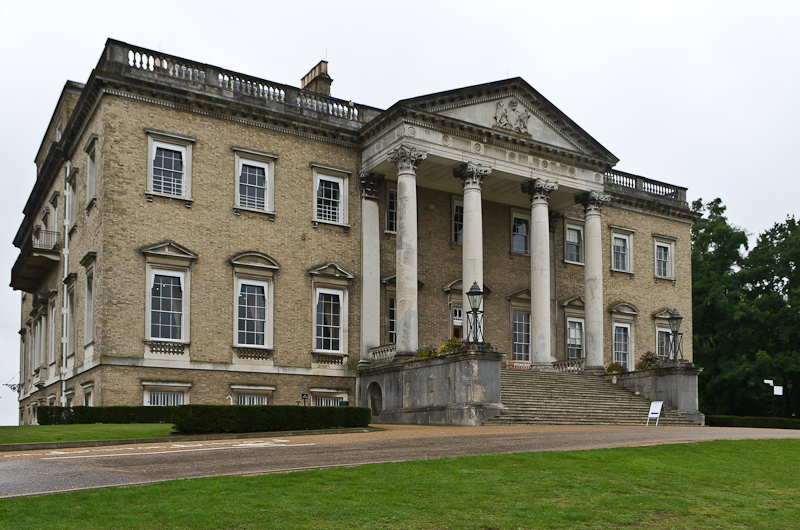
Claremont house: Charles Edward's birthplace and childhood home

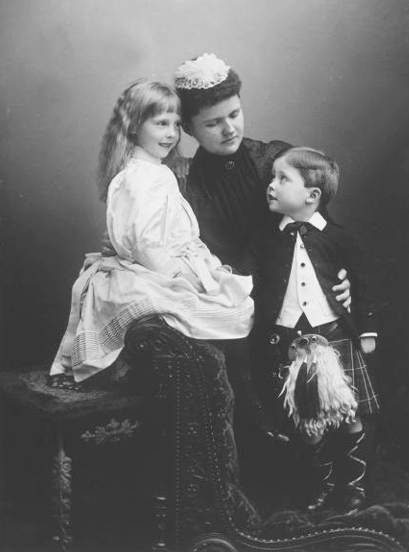
Charles Edward, wearing the uniform of the Seaforth Highlanders, with his mother and sister (c. 1890)

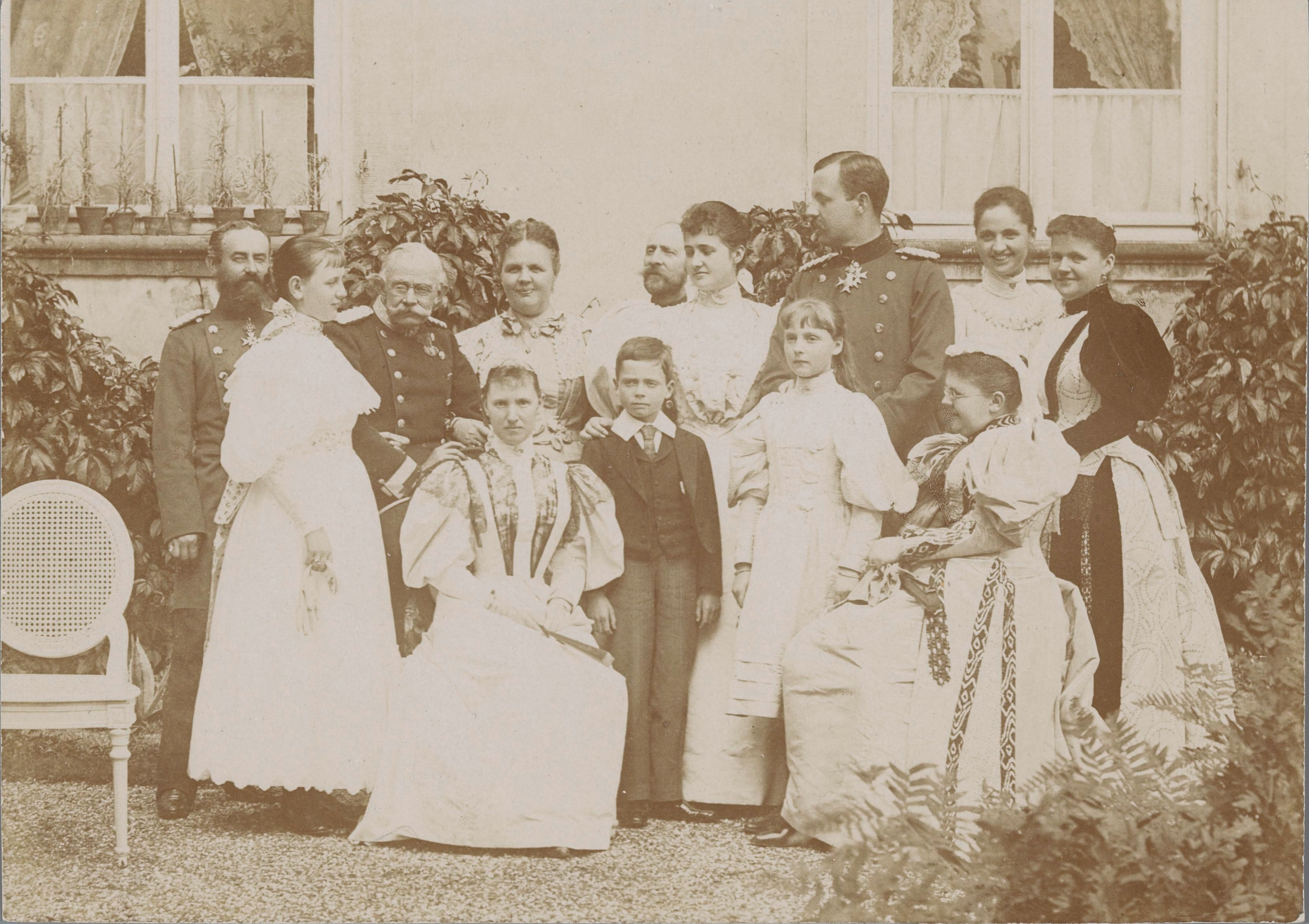
Charles Edward (front centre) with his sister, mother and maternal family (1895)

Theo Aronson described the Albany household at Claremont House as "cosy, comfortable, well-ordered". After her husband's death, the British Parliament had given Helen an annual grant from the civil list of 6,000 pound sterling. (Note: According to the Bank of England's model for tracking inflation, £6,000 in 1890 was the equivalent of about £638,000 in 2023.) This did not make her as wealthy as she was during her marriage, but did allow her to employ several domestic servants, including a number responsible for the children. One of Charles Edward's childhood nannies referred to him as "delicate and sensitive, nervous and tiring". Medical experts consulted by the royal family believed that he had been permanently harmed by the grief which his widowed mother had suffered from during her pregnancy. No record of Charles Edward's own childhood memories exists, but Alice fondly recalled this period of their lives. Aronson commented that the environment where the two children were looked after was a "typical, late nineteenth-century nursery". He described it as:

... a small, self-contained world of early-to-rise, porridge for breakfast, vigorous hair-brushings, buttoned boots, holland pinafores, pick-a-back rides, stories, squabbles, tears, treats and punishments, bland nursery meals, walks to the lake to feed the wild ducks with squares of dry bread ... , little covered baskets holding soup or jelly or junket for the sick, pony rides in the park, baths filled with hot water from highly polished copper cans, firelight, lamplight, warming-pans, good-night prayers, nightlights.

Caring for the children was mainly the responsibility of their nannies, but they spent time with their mother for set periods each day. She taught the children practical skills, such as knitting, and gave them their Sunday school lessons. Helen read them literature by various well-known English and Scottish authors of the 19th century. She was an affectionate mother but also a strict one—insisting her children were brought up with stern discipline and encouraged to develop a sense of duty. Her son did not react well to this, becoming afraid of his mother and authority more generally.

Public duties, such as attending public events and providing patronage to charities, were a part of the royal family's functions. Aronson suggests that while they possessed "a highly developed sense of duty and responsibility", they were naïve about the deeply unpleasant conditions in which much of the British population lived. Charles Edward's mother was—unusually for a German aristocrat—especially interested in social issues and, according to Alice, the children were encouraged to sympathise with others and engage in charitable work. Alice felt that "discipline at home and familiarity with the troubles of others ... cultivated in us [children] a sense of responsibility, poise and self-control."

Historian Hubertus Büschel indicates that the British royal family had high expectations for their young members' education. Charles Edward's first teacher was a governess called "Mrs Potts" who taught him together with his sister. The siblings developed a lifelong interest in history from her lessons where they were allowed to play-act historical scenes. He was then sent to school without his sister, studying in the privately funded public school system. Charles Edward attended two prep schools, firstly Sandroyd School in Surrey, (Note: Now located in Wiltshire.) and later Park Hill School in Lyndhurst. In a 1896 diary entry, Queen Victoria mentioned meeting the headmaster of the latter school "Mr Rawnsley" and his wife. She commented that: "All they said was most satisfactory. He seems to be very careful & kind."

Charles Edward developed an interest in military and royal occasions at a young age. He was given his first ceremonial position in the Seaforth Highlanders regiment of the British Army as a child. Victoria mentioned the five-year-old Prince wearing the "full uniform of the Seaforth Highlanders" in her diary. Shortly before his 13th birthday, Charles Edward participated in a parade for the Diamond Jubilee of Queen Victoria. The boy climbed on the roof of Buckingham Palace to see the assembled crowds before the event. He was described in contemporary press reports as being the most well-received participant.

In 1898 the prince enrolled at Eton College and his mother hoped he would eventually go on to Oxford University. Press reports sometimes accused the boy of behaving self-importantly at school, refusing to complete mandatory chores as he considered them a "degradation". He was happy at Eton and looked back nostalgically at his time at that school throughout his life. Aronson described the prince in his early teens as "small, blue-eyed, exceptionally handsome and highly strung". He was not expected to grow up to be a particularly prominent person.

== First years in Germany ==
=== Selection as heir ===
Outline of Saxe-Coburg and Gotha (in red) in the German Empire

Duke Alfred's only son, Prince Alfred, died in 1899. The Duke was in poor health and the question of who would be his successor became an issue for the family. Alfred was seen as an inadequate foreigner by many members of the German governing elite, and a number of German princes wanted to split up the duchy among themselves. Prince Arthur, Duke of Connaught and Strathearn, Victoria and Albert's third son, was initially heir presumptive. The German press objected to a foreigner taking the throne, for instance, the Berliner Tageblatt (Berlin Daily) commented;

The highest value that three bloody wars have given the German people is a newly awakened national consciousness. The first Chancellor [Bismarck] praised the reigning Princes as custodians and carers of the newly founded German Reich (realm). They have to be German Princes. It is impossible to have two souls inside one’s breast—a German and a foreign one.

Wilhelm II opposed a man who had served in the British army becoming ruler of a German state. Arthur's son, Prince Arthur of Connaught, was at Eton with Charles Edward. Wilhelm II demanded a German education for the boy, but this was unacceptable to the Duke of Connaught. Thus both Charles Edward's uncle and cousin renounced their claims to the duchy, leaving Charles Edward next in line. The prince was named heir under family pressure. Only fourteen years old at the time, Charles Edward's young age—as well as his German mother and lack of his British father—meant that he was deemed able to assimilate into German society in a way an older man would not be. The local newspaper in Coburg praised the choice.

The boy seemed unhappy with the change of situation that had been imposed on him. There were reports in the American press that the younger Arthur had physically attacked Charles Edward or threatened to do so if he did not accept the position. Historian Alan R. Rushton quoted him as saying: "I've got to go and be a beastly German prince." Rushton suggested that the adults around him appear to have encouraged Charles Edward to embrace his new role. His sister remembered their mother saying "I have always tried to bring up Charlie as a good Englishman, and now I have to turn him into a good German". Field Marshal Frederick Roberts told him to "Try to be a good German!" However, both Büschel and Aronson interpret his mother's comment instead as an expression of frustration about the new situation.

Queen Victoria was irritated by Wilhelm interfering with what she perceived as her family's entitlement to the dukedom. Alice believed, however, that the Queen considered Alfred her favourite son and was thus glad that he was not going to Germany. The prince was confirmed before leaving and Victoria commented in her diary, based on her daughter Beatrice's account of the event, that "Poor Helen & Charlie had borne up well during the service, but were much overcome [by emotion] afterwards. It is very hard upon the poor child having to be uprooted like this...".

=== Education ===
Charles Edward moved to Germany with his mother and sister when he was fifteen. He spoke little German. Duke Alfred wanted to separate Charles Edward from his mother, so she took her son to stay with her brother-in-law—King William II of Württemberg—and found him a tutor. Helen then considered how he should be educated. The priority was reassuring Germans that he was being brought up as a German. Various members of the extended family made suggestions. Alfred wanted to be given responsibility for his heir but was considered too British. A school suggested by Empress Victoria was, according to Alice, felt to have too many Jewish pupils. Helen ultimately gave Wilhelm control over her son's education.

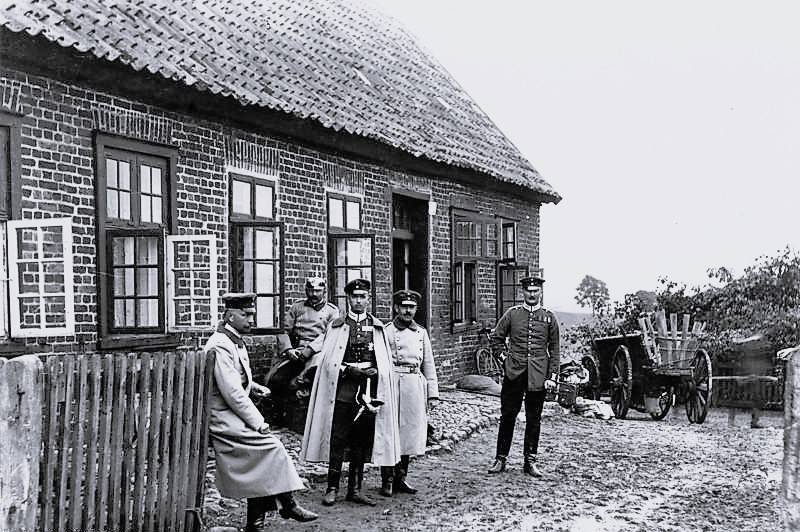
Charles Edward with his staff at a military exercise (1904)

According to Urbach, Wilhelm wanted to turn his young cousin into a "Prussian officer". The emperor associated the British aristocracy with political liberalism and wished to expunge the prince of such views. He invited the family to live in Potsdam, a town near Berlin which was used as the German emperor's summer residence. Charles Edward attended the Preußische Hauptkadettenanstalt (Prussian Central Cadet Institute) at Lichterfelde. Wilhelm informed Queen Victoria in a telegraph that one of his staff had "chosen eight well-behaved boys to form a class for him". The prince studied the German language and military science. Urbach suggested he learnt the language quickly and commented that his "German essays [at the military academy] were soon receiving higher marks than his English ones". He was made a lieutenant of cavalry on his 16th birthday in 1900, and joined the 1. Garderegiment zu Fuß (1st Foot Guards) at Potsdam. The prince received regular military training and was often reminded of a German monarch's duty to serve his nation.

Wilhelm II took such interest in Charles Edward's assimilation into German society that the latter was known in the Imperial Court as "the Emperor's seventh son". The prince, with his mother and sister, spent much of their spare time at the German court in Berlin, where they were treated as members of the emperor's family. Wilhelm had seven children, the older of whom were a similar age to the Albany siblings; Alice later wrote that they were "like another brother and sister to them". The women got on well with Empress Augusta Victoria, while Wilhelm became something of a substitute father for Charles Edward. Wilhelm saw Charles Edward as impressionable. He introduced the prince to his own worldview which included antisemitism, German nationalism and hostility to the Reichstag (parliament). During a political scandal in 1908, there were allegations of the young man engaging in homosexual activity with Wilhelm.

In 1903, Charles Edward completed his university entrance qualification. His results were not made public. Charles Edward then studied government management at Prussian government ministries. He attended Bonn University. The university chancellor gave a speech at the young duke's matriculation which was circulated in German newspapers; he commented that a man needed to take on an entirely German identity and outlook to "fully and truly fulfill the vocation of a German prince". The prince studied law, but was not a particularly academic young man, and mainly enjoyed participating in the Corps Borussia Bonn.

=== Regency ===
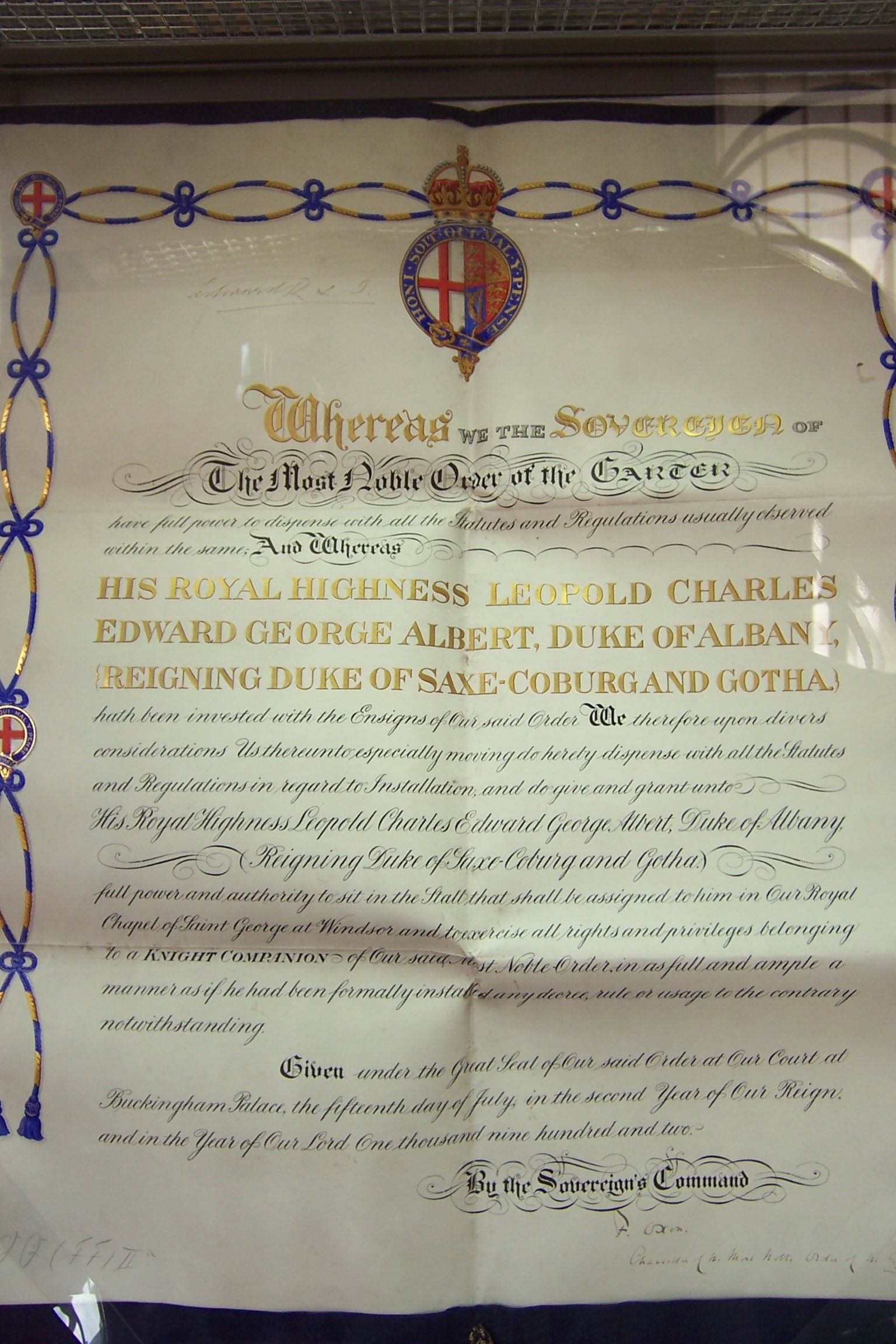
Charles Edward's diploma of the Order of the Garter (c. 1905)

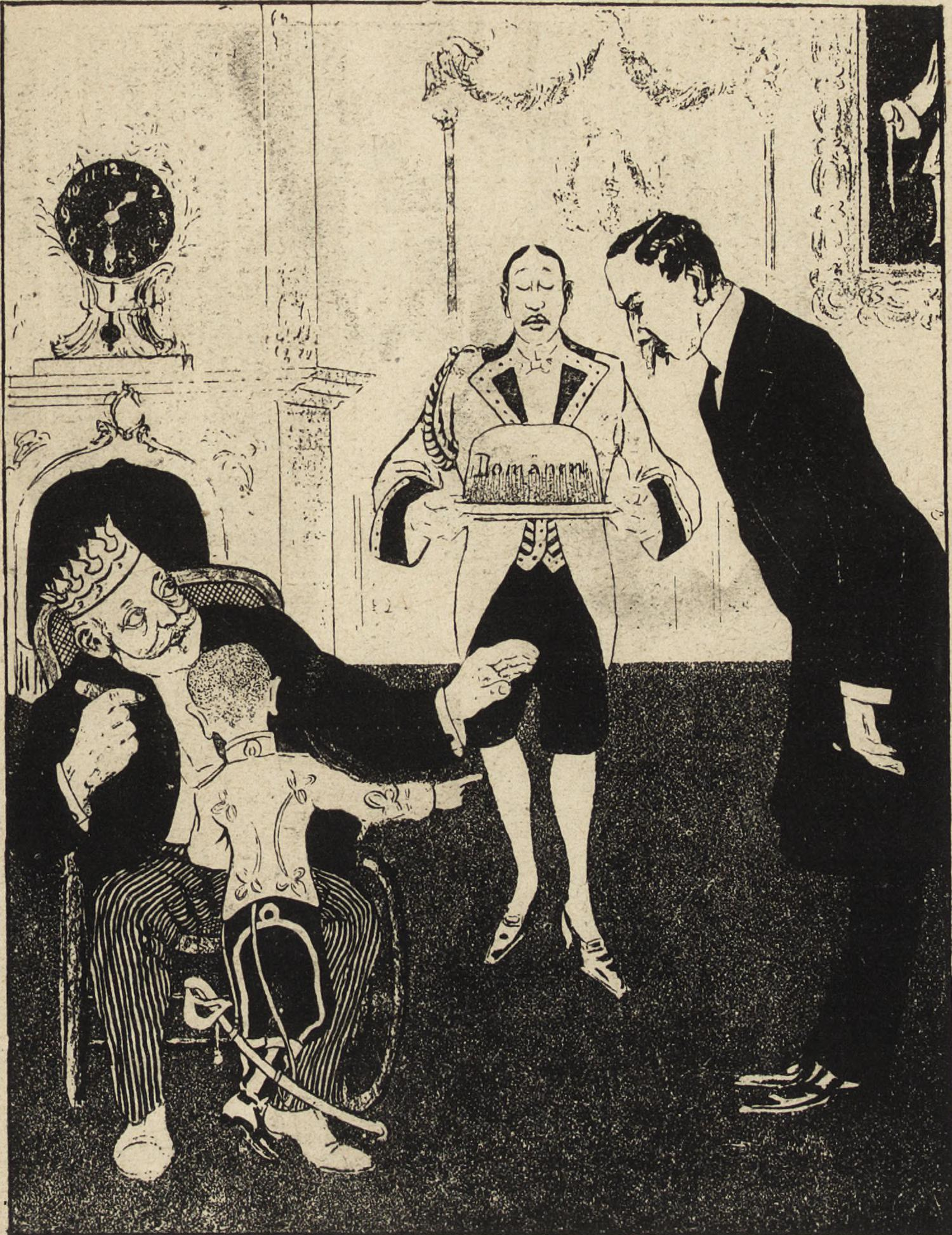
Satirical cartoon, depicting Charles Edward as a small boy with Edward VII, which appeared in Der Wahre Jacob. (1903) (Note: Charles Edward says "Uncle Edward is it true that I should only have half of this cake?" It is a reference to Edward VII holding the title of Duke of Saxony, which was traditionally held by the Duke of Saxe-Coburg and Gotha. This version of the image was a reprint in L'oncle de l'Europe; a collection of illustrations depicting Edward VII edited by John Grand-Carteret and published in 1906.)

Charles Edward inherited the ducal throne of Saxe-Coburg and Gotha at the age of sixteen when his uncle Alfred died at the age of 55 in July 1900. The boy cried at the funeral—a reaction that Urbach interpreted as an expression of fear about his future rather than grief for an uncle he had relatively little relationship with. The local press warmly described his first visit to Coburg in August 1900; Coburg residents had reportedly seen the "handsome, bright and intelligent face of a boy" through the train window and been happy to discover that he was their new duke. Wilhelm appointed Prince Ernst of Hohenlohe-Langenburg as regent until Charles Edward's 21st birthday.

In 1901, he attended Queen Victoria's funeral wearing the uniform of the Prussian Hussars. His eldest paternal uncle, who succeeded Queen Victoria as King Edward VII, was seen embracing Charles Edward at the funeral. The new king made his nephew a Knight of the Garter in 1902. Charles Edward's mother decided he was old enough to look after himself in 1903 and left Germany with Alice. In May 1905, Edward appointed him Colonel-in-chief of the Seaforth Highlanders, a British army regiment.

There was significant public interest in Germany in Charles Edward's development into a German. According to Rushton, some Germans felt "it was now important for the English boy to become a German man and leader of his adopted land". Charles Edward tried his best to assimilate while maintaining some links with Britain such as participating in Anglican religious services. Various statements made by the prince during this period suggest he was homesick and unhappy with his situation.

Charles Edward often did not enjoy his time in Berlin, where the emperor seemed to become resentful of him and frequently bullied him. A 1905 entry in the diary of an official at the Berlin court commented that "what usually happens is that he [the emperor] pinches and puffs him so much that the poor little Duke actually gets beaten up". While Büschel suggests that such behaviour was partially a reflection of the emperor's personality, Edgar Feuchtwanger, another historian, argues that it served a political purpose "to make him [Charles Edward] more German than the Germans".

Charlotte Zeepvat, author of his entry in the Oxford Dictionary of National Biography (ODNB), described him as a "conscientious young man with a taste for the arts and music", who became popular in Coburg during this period. Aronson similarly commented that although Charles Edward had "grown to maturity in an atmosphere of strident Prussian militarism", he was "cultivated ... fond of music and the theatre, interested in history and architecture". Urbach described the young duke as "immature".

== Duke of Saxe-Coburg and Gotha ==
=== Marriage and children ===
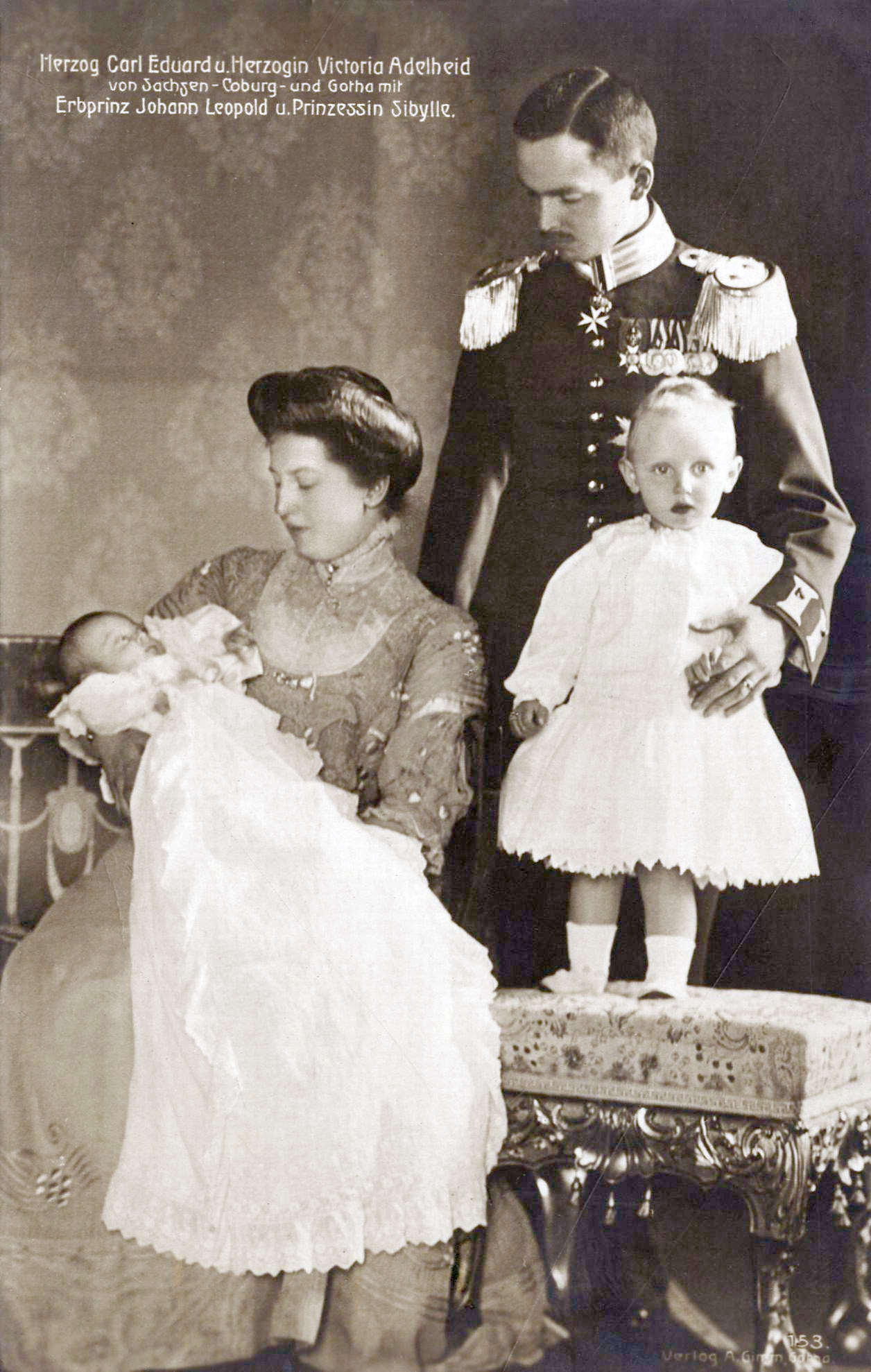
The Duke and Duchess of Saxe-Coburg-Gotha with their two eldest children (1908)

As Charles Edward was considered to have an "ambiguous" attitude towards women, according to Urbach, his family decided he needed an arranged marriage at a young age. Wilhelm II chose his wife's niece, Princess Victoria Adelaide of Schleswig-Holstein-Sonderburg-Glücksburg, as the bride of Charles Edward. She was believed to be well-adjusted and loyal to Wilhelm's royal house. Her nationality was seen as important and Victoria Adelaide lacked any non-German or Jewish ancestry. The young man was told to propose to her and he obliged. A degree of affection did exist between the young couple. They married on 11 October 1905, at Glücksburg Castle, Schleswig-Holstein. An article about the wedding in the London and China Express, a British newspaper focused on foreign affairs, commented that:

All the [German] newspapers sing the praises of the young Duke and describe his sympathetic character and bearing. Above all they are never tired of emphasising how German he has become, how he has completely forgotten the English training of his early youth, identifying himself in every way with the interests of Germany.

The couple had five children: Prince Johann Leopold (1906–1972), Princess Sibylla (1908–1972), Prince Hubertus (1909–1943), Princess Caroline Mathilde (1912–1983), and Prince Friedrich Josias (1918–1998). As was expected for upper-class households at the time, caring for the children was largely delegated to the domestic servants. The family mainly spoke English at home, though the children learnt to speak German fluently. Hubertus was the Duke's favourite child. A profile of the family published in the British newspaper The Sphere in 1914, commented that the "bright, happy children" enjoyed skiing, riding and playing outside.

Zeepvat commented that the Duke and Duchess were happily married, but Urbach indicated otherwise. Urbach commented that Charles Edward's children were frightened of their father, who treated them "like a military unit", and noted that the family often appear unhappy in photographs. His younger daughter, Princess Caroline Mathilde, claimed that her father had sexually abused her. The allegation was backed by one of her brothers. Charles Edward was often disappointed by his children's choice of romantic relationships, at a time when he was trying to use strategic marriages to improve the diminished reputation of his royal house.

=== Peacetime reign ===
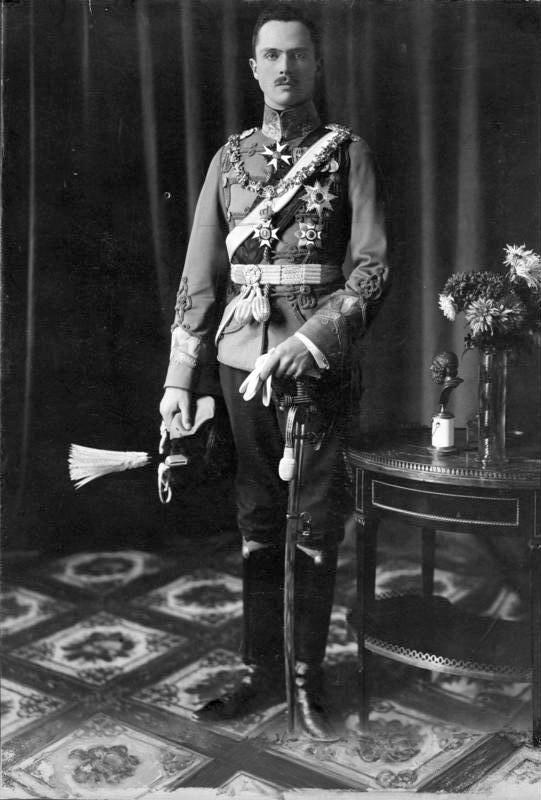
Charles Edward (1906)

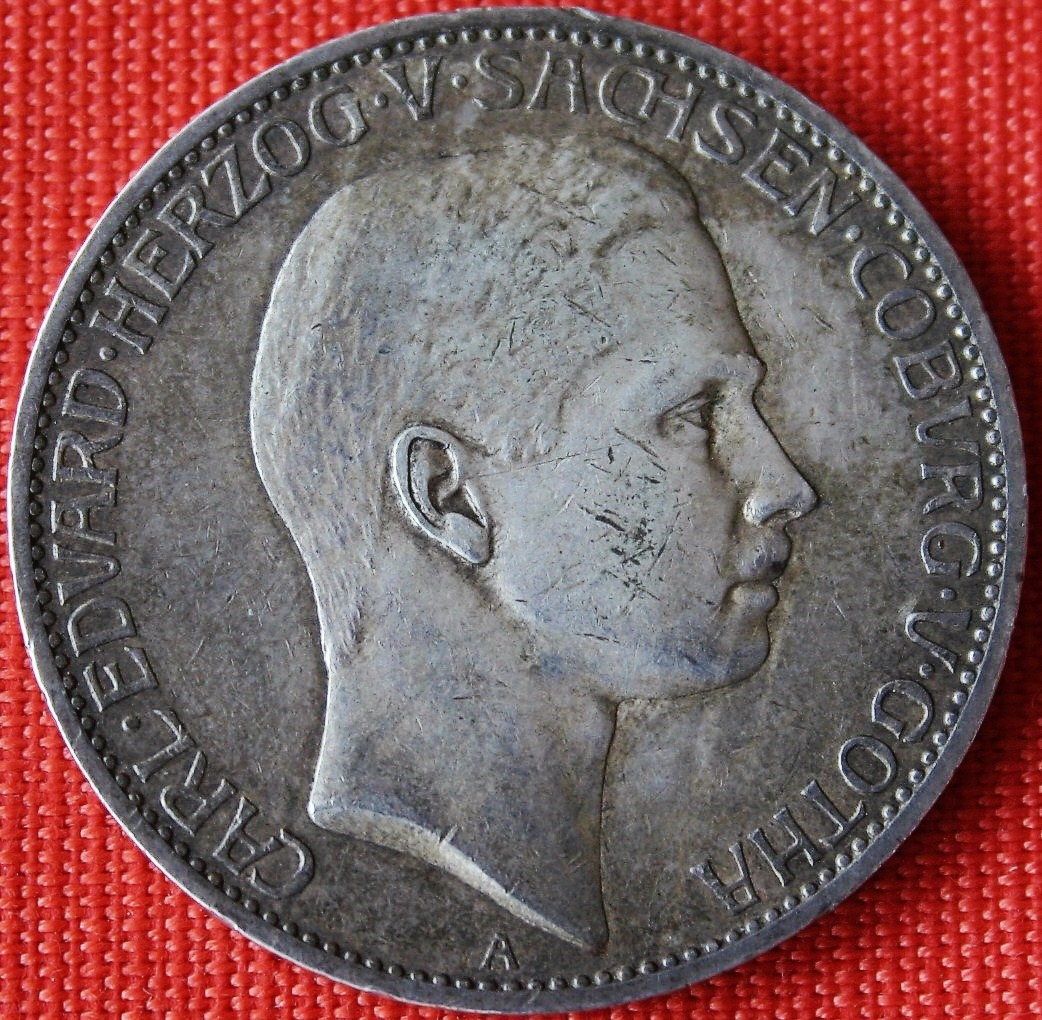
Profile of Charles Edward on a five mark coin, dating from 1907

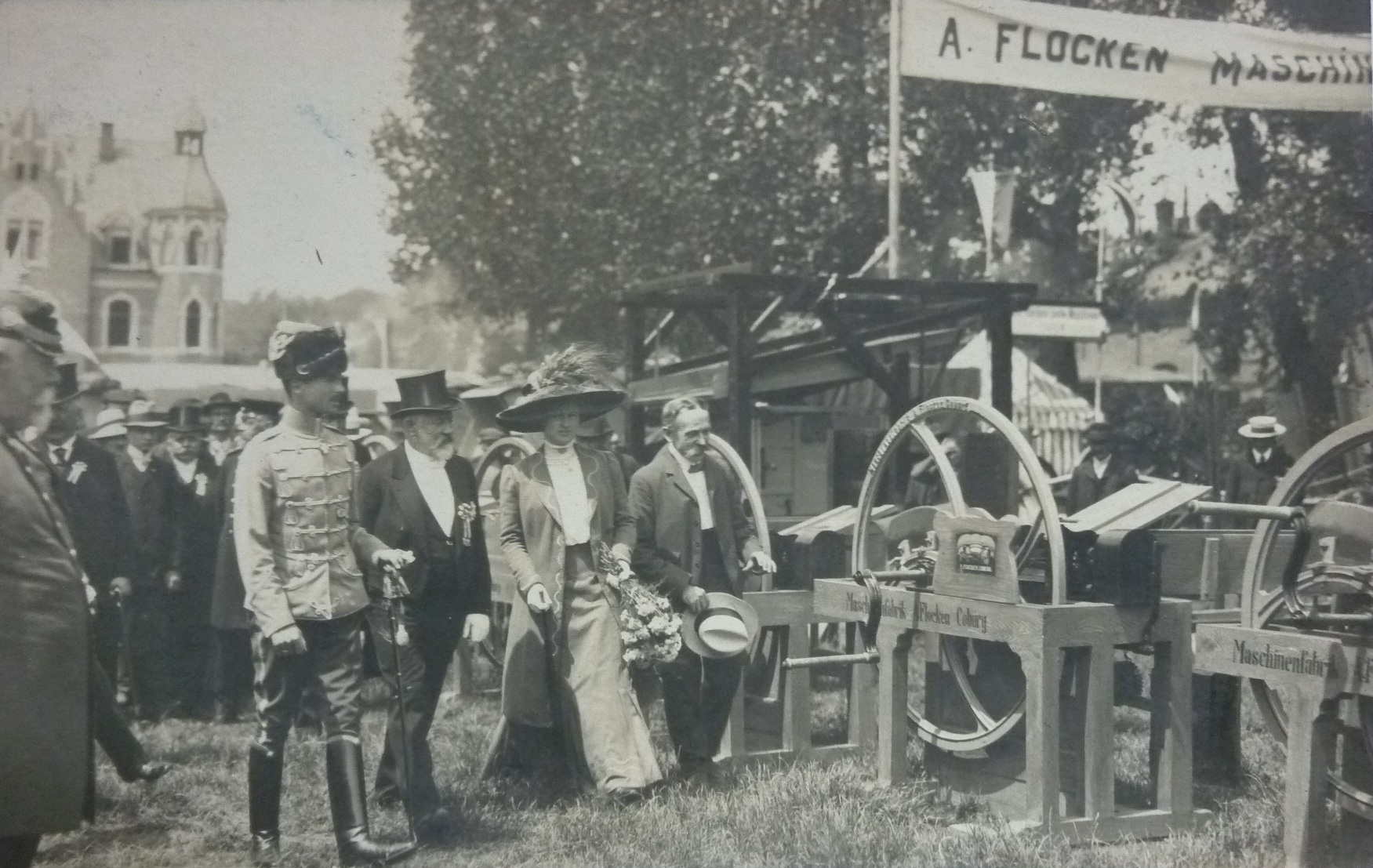
Charles Edward (in a pale military tunic) visiting an agricultural show in Coburg (1910)

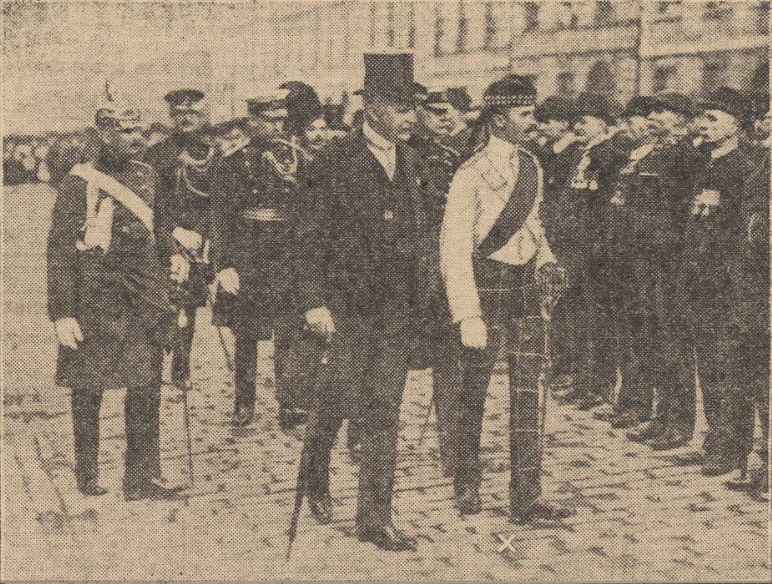
Charles Edward (wearing a Glengarry cap) inspects veterans of the Seaforth Highlanders in Edinburgh (1910)

Charles Edward assumed full constitutional powers upon coming of age on 19 July 1905. At his investiture, he read a speech promising his allegiance to the German Empire and was cheered by onlookers after he publicly sampled local food. He was happy with his new territories, which he considered pretty. He joined various patriotic groups to emphasise his loyalties. However, according to Urbach, the Duke lacked popularity. This was especially true in Gotha, an impoverished town with left-wing sympathies; to them, he seemed absolutist. In Coburg—a wealthy and conservative town known for its intense nationalism—people were generally more sympathetic to Charles Edward but disliked a sense of foreignness they detected about him. He continued to have an English accent. He faced criticism for keeping Scottish Terrier dogs and for always appearing in public with a police guard. Charles Edward was anxious about his reputation, with his officials surveying public opinion. The Duke frequently tried to emphasise his loyalty to Germany through displays of cultural traditions such as Christmas festivities and folk costumes.

Historian Friedrich Facius described Charles Edward as initially a liberal who shifted in a more authoritarian direction. He was supportive of the emperor and understood the governmental institutions. The new duke appointed Ernst von Richter, a conservative-leaning, Prussian government official, as his prime minister. According to Rushton, the Duke's political worldview was "conservative and nationalistic", reflecting what had been inculcated into him by Wilhelm II. He largely left governing to the cabinet he appointed. They used the motto "Everything as it has been" to describe their approach. The Duke generally tried to stay out of politics, especially diplomatic issues between Great Britain and Germany. In 1910, he joined the "Reich Association against Social Democracy", a pro-monarchist political organisation.

Charles Edward frequently visited local events. He was a prominent figure in local civic life chairing many cultural or charitable organisations and offering patronage. The Duke was interested in new forms of transportation, especially automobiles and airships. He invested in the creation of a new airship docking bay in Gotha, a decision that appeared commercially sensible. In 1913, he asked the German emperor to convert the civilian flying school there into a military one, which Wilhelm agreed to do in secret. He enthusiastically supported the court theatres in both towns and organised the restoration of the Veste Coburg, which was conducted between 1908 and 1924.

Charles Edward continued to have a good relationship with the British royal family and regularly visited the United Kingdom. In 1910, the Daily Mirror published a photograph of him wearing the uniform of the Seaforth Highlanders at an inspection of its veterans. In private, he frequently engaged in British activities even while in Germany. The Duke and Duchess performed Scottish country dances to bagpipes. His immediate family used English-language nicknames. Charles Edward received regular visits from Alice and his brother-in-law Prince Alexander of Teck. He developed a close bond with Edward, Prince of Wales, while the latter was a university student in the early 1910s. Büschel believed that Charles Edward's attempts to come across as German during this period were likely an effort to please Wilhelm II and nationalists in Germany, rather than an expression of his own identity.

Members of the German political elite were often irritated by the Duke's continued close relationship with Great Britain. Some of the more intense criticism came from the lower-ranking nobility of Franconia who often saw themselves as the most purely German of the German nobility. For instance, Baron Konstantin von Gebsattel claimed that "foreigners" holding German titles were a "nuisance" because they prevented a necessary battle against the "cancer" of Judaism, the Social Democratic Party (SPD), a left-wing German political party, and "freedom". While the Imperial German government was not as radical, it was displeased by some of Charles Edward's behaviour. His decision to wear the uniform of his ceremonial British regiment at the funeral of Edward VII in 1910 caused particular annoyance. Officials at the German Embassy in London were suspicious of his frequent visits to the United Kingdom.

Rushton commended that the Duke had in this period "every reason to be happy with his life: a growing healthy family, minimal professional duties, the opportunity to live very well and associate with his friends and relatives at the upper echelons of society in Europe". The Duke became a major local landowner and had an annual income of about 2.5 million marks. (Note: According to Historical statistics, a currency converter created by Stockholm University, 2,500,000 marks in 1910 was the equivalent of about £122,000 at the time.) By 1918 he would have an estimated wealth of between 50 and 60 million marks. He lived in both Coburg and Gotha for several months each year, as well as visiting his mountain or hunting lodges. He usually worked in the morning and spent the afternoon on leisure activities such as hiking. Recreation took up the bulk of his time and he was frequently abroad or in other parts of Germany. Charles Edward struggled with social interaction, especially with those who were different from him. He stopped local people from entering the countryside surrounding his castles, adding to his seclusion. He tended to spend much of his time in the company of courtiers who regularly offered him praise.

=== First World War ===
The First World War caused a conflict of loyalties for Charles Edward, but he decided to support the German Empire. He was in England at the time of the assassination of Archduke Franz Ferdinand to receive an honorary degree as a Doctor of Civil Laws from Oxford University. He told his sister that he wanted to fight for Great Britain but felt obligated to return to his duchy, where public opinion began to turn against the Duke due to his British origins. He returned to Germany on 9 July.

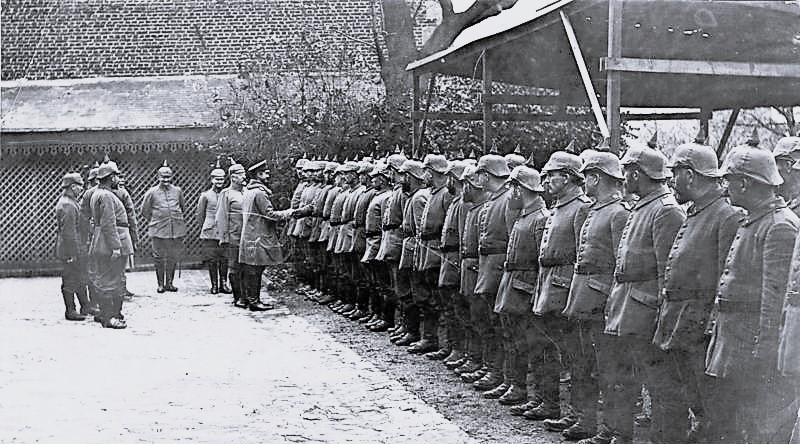
Charles Edward inspecting soldiers (1914)

At the start of the war the German press criticised the foreign links of the German aristocracy, Charles Edward was especially heavily attacked and accused of being a "half-Englishman". The Duke publicly denounced Britain, accusing it of attacking Germany, and renounced his position as Colonel-in-chief of the Seaforth Highlanders. He sold his British military decorations rather than returning them which Büschel indicates was a gesture of contempt towards his family, albeit one that was likely for display. He broke off relations with his family at the British and Belgian courts; this did not suffice to overcome doubts about his loyalties in Germany. His attitudes would become more sincerely pro-German as the war years progressed. After the war, he would describe the events of 1914, in a letter to his sister, as the end of his personal "happiness".

Charles Edward could not participate in combat as his leg had been permanently damaged in a sledging accident. He provided non-combat support to the army corps from his territories, travelling with them into the areas where warfare was taking place. He initially participated in the German invasion of Belgium. Here, the Duke witnessed the Sack of Dinant by German soldiers where hundreds of Belgian civilians were killed. His adjutant Marcel von Schack—who felt that the Belgian civilians had been treated correctly—wrote that the event had made an "unforgettable impression" on the Duke. He was transferred to the Eastern Front at the start of September 1914. He disliked the way local people he met on the Eastern Front lived and thought that the homes of Jews, in particular, were dirty. Charles Edward received an Iron Cross "for bravery" at the end of 1914. In the middle war years, Charles Edward made various visits to the Western Front and areas of conflict in the Balkans.

The Duke never held a command. Soldiers from his duchies were awarded the Carl-Eduard-Kriegskreuz (Carl Eduard War Cross). The Duke's adjutant wrote diaries about his activities which were reported to the German military command and circulated in the German press for propaganda purposes. They presented him as sharing in the soldiers' difficult living conditions and describe him spending Christmas with them. In reality, he was unwell with rheumatism and ankylosing spondylitis, a type of arthritis. He usually stayed a long way behind the frontlines and regularly returned to Germany for medical treatment. This was a source of disapproval among some members of the German elite who felt that a young soldier should be able to repress his illnesses. According to Urbach, Charles Edward "was more or a less a chocolate soldier, who spent most of his time dining at various casinos behind the front and visiting 'his' Coburg troops".

The Duke acted as an intermediary between the German government and his relative Ferdinand I, ruler of the Kingdom of Bulgaria, which was a member of the Central Powers. Ferdinand had declared Bulgarian independence from the Ottoman Empire in 1908 and the Kingdom had fallen into economic crisis following the Second Balkan War. Charles Edward had offered a great deal of assistance to Ferdinand throughout those events including financial support. In 1916, Ferdinand wanted to go to war with the Ottoman Empire, something the Germans did not want because they were allied with the Ottomans. Charles Edward travelled to the Bulgarian capital city of Sofia on behalf of Wilhelm and persuaded Ferdinand not to.

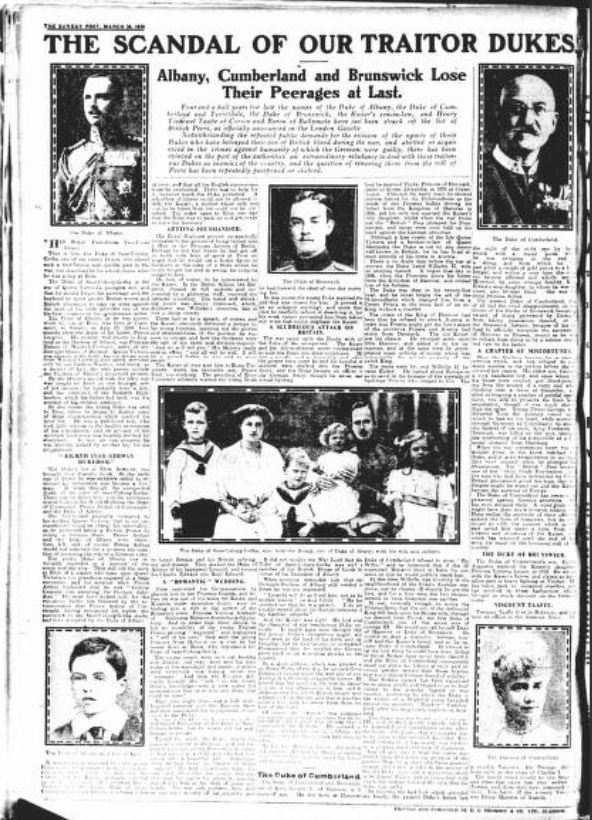
Article in The Sunday Post discussing a number of noblemen, including Charles Edward, losing their titles under the Titles Deprivation Act 1917 (1919)

The Duke was denounced as a traitor in Britain. He was one of a group of noblemen living in Germany and Austria who held British titles but sided with the Central Powers—a group frequently identified in the British press as the "traitor peers". For instance, soon after the conclusion of the war, The Sunday Post published a report on the "traitor dukes". It included a negative and personally vitriolic profile of Charles Edward's life which called his role in the war "one of the blackest chapters in his ignominious career". Büschel noted that describing the Duke as a traitor was accurate as he was still a British subject and was participating in a war against the United Kingdom. He had never formally become a German national.

In 1915, King George V ordered his name removed from the register of the Most Noble Order of the Garter. In 1917, a law change in Coburg effectively banned Charles Edward's British relatives from succeeding to the duchy. This decision was praised by German newspapers, one of which declared that he had "torn" his relationship with his birth country. Over the summer of 1917 bombers built in Gotha, which were named after the town, conducted multiple air raids in London and South East England which killed several hundred British civilians. That year, Charles Edward's British property which was worth several million pounds was confiscated. Charles Edward responded by introducing a legal change that would stop his British relatives from ever inheriting his other property. The British royal family later changed its name from the German-sounding Saxe-Coburg and Gotha to the House of Windsor. The Titles Deprivation Act 1917 began the process of removing his British titles. Urbach observed that Charles Edward did not seem to care that his behaviour might have put his mother, who was living in London under the protection of Queen Mary, at risk of reprisals.

Charles Edward worked for the military staff on the Western Front in the later war years. He contributed 250,000 marks out of his personal wealth as financial support for the families of dead soldiers from his territories. A report published in The Times, a few years after the war, commented that he had often assisted British prisoners of war—a decision which it described as a sign of his "consideration and humanity". The Duke was alarmed by the murder of the Russian royal family in 1918; Empress Alexandra was one of his first cousins. He worried that the same thing would happen to his own family. Rushton wrote that it was the beginning of the fear of communism that would define his political activities in years to come. He joined the League of the Emperor's Loyalists, an organisation of supporters of the German emperor, though he preferred German general and de facto military dictator Paul von Hindenburg as a leader. Büschel argued that Charles Edward's First World War experiences were a "school for nationalism, violence, and antisemitism".

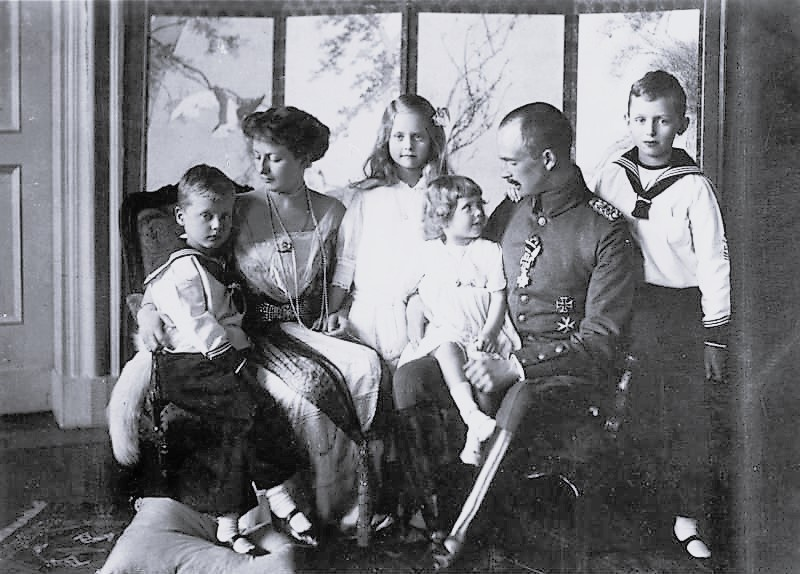
The Duke and Duchess of Saxe-Coburg-Gotha and their four eldest children (1918)

The war placed severe burdens on the German population, and after mid-1918, the empire's military situation collapsed. Late in the year an armistice was signed and a revolution broke out in Germany. On 11 November 1918, a peaceful demonstration took place against the Duke in Coburg. The duchy's prime minister, Hermann Quarck, convinced the local SPD, which had many relatively well-off members, that further unrest would be dangerous to the town's scenery. The political mood in Gotha, where people were starving, was more radical and a workers' and soldiers' council essentially seized control. Charles Edward waited longer than most of the other ruling princes to respond to the situation. He announced that he had "ceased to rule" on 14 November but did not explicitly abdicate. According to Rushton, the slowness of Charles Edward's abdication was due to anxiety that he would be killed. However, the transition of power in Coburg was quite calm and orderly compared to the transfer of power in some other parts of Germany. The German nobility was not physically attacked during the revolution, but the situation was deeply frightening to them and a cause of much resentment.

== Far-right advocate ==
=== Aftermath of the First World War ===
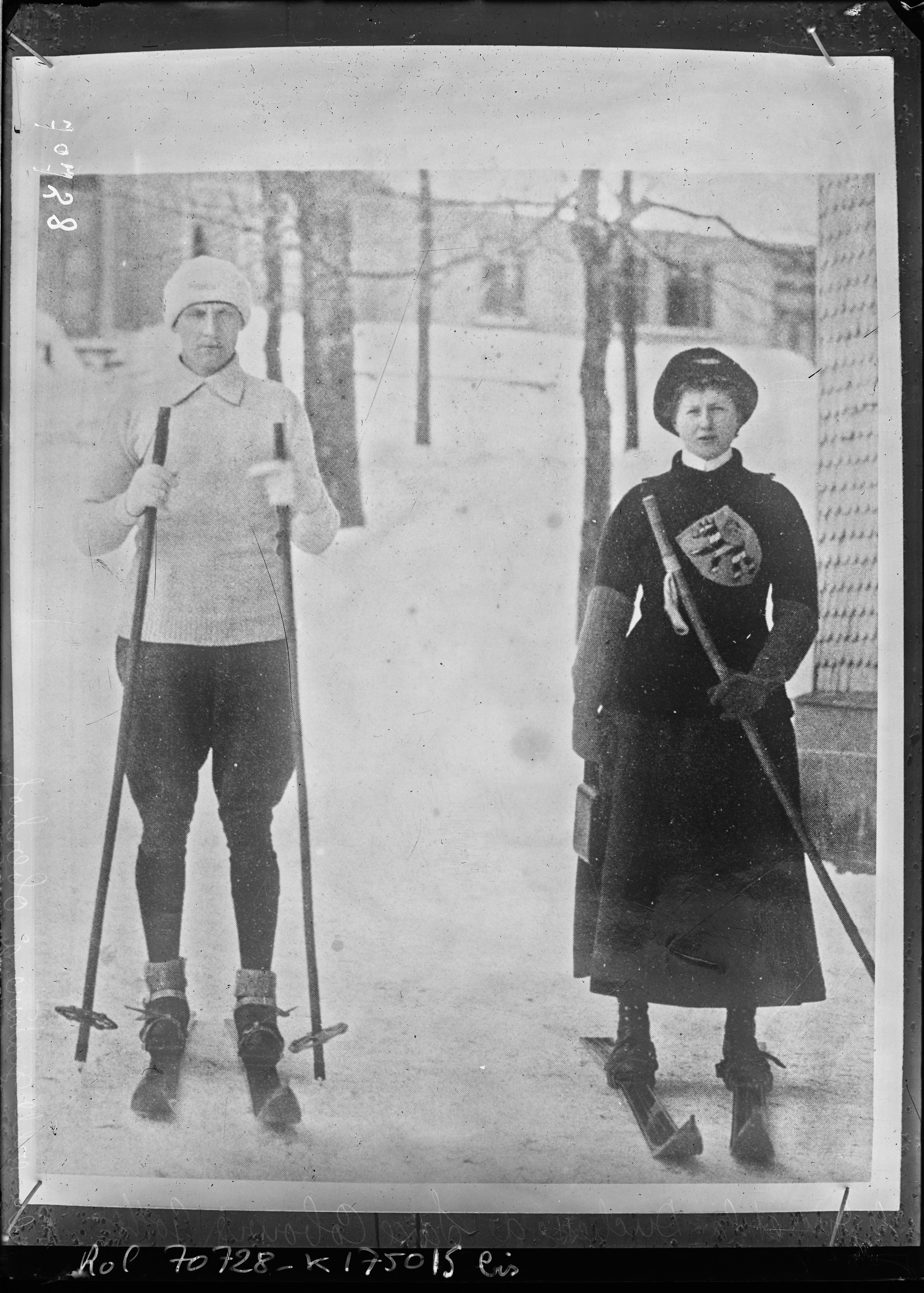
Charles Edward and his wife skiing in the German town of Oberhof (1921)

Urbach wrote that Charles Edward was not popular and was still seen by some as English. By the end of the war, the left-wing, anti-royalist parts of the press had been nicknaming him "Mr Albany", in a reference to his foreign origins. But he could still live in Coburg fairly contentedly. According to Rushton, he retained much of his prestige and he was often seen as essentially still the duke by his former subjects. Coburg was a politically conservative town and the new post-war world was frightening to many people. The inhabitants continued to look to Charles Edward for guidance. In 1920, Coburg became part of the German state of Bavaria while Gotha became part of Thuringia. While Bavaria had a conservative political culture that Coburg fitted into well, culturally the move marked a significant change. This added to a sense that the former duke and his family remained the natural leaders of the community.

In 1919, he also lost his British titles. However, some personal sympathy remained for him among the political establishment in the United Kingdom due to the way in which he had been forced to go to Germany as a teenager. He continued to use some of the iconography and titles associated with the British royal family for the rest of his life. He visited his mother and sister in London in 1921 but was generally unwanted in Britain. When Charles Edward's mother died in 1922, the British government stopped him from inheriting Claremont House—a development that upset him.

In 1919, his properties and his collections in Coburg were transferred to the Coburg State Foundation, a foundation that still exists today. A similar solution for Gotha took longer, and only after legal struggles with the State of Thuringia was it set up in 1928–34. After 1919, the family retained Callenberg Castle, some other properties (including those in Austria) and a right to live at Veste Coburg. It also received substantial financial compensation for lost possessions. The refurbishment of Veste Coburg was completed at the state's expense. Some additional real estate in Thuringia was restored to the ducal family in 1925. While the post-war democratic German state presented little threat to his property, Charles Edward continued to be paranoid about a communist revolution. He wrote in a letter to his sister in 1928 that:

I only hope our winter will remain quiet but the Russians seem to be getting our communists on the move ... In different parts of Germany they have begun attacking our nationalists, but have luckily been beaten off with cracked crowns. If only the leaders would leave the workmen in peace. They are so sensible, 'wenn sie nicht verhetzt werden' (when they are not riled up).

=== 1920s political and paramilitary activities ===
Charles Edward continued to describe himself as a monarchist in the post-First-World-War period. He was said to want to return to political power as "King of Thuringia". In practice, however, his enthusiasm for restoration was lukewarm. His emotional attachment to the German emperor largely ended with Wilhelm's exile. The former duke began to look for political options which he saw as a stronger alternative to the deposed German emperor.

Charles Edward became far more overtly involved in politics after being deposed, supporting the nationalist and conservative right. The former duke was nostalgic for aspects of pre-war Germany, especially its militarism, and was frightened by communism. Urbach also suggested he had an obsession with masculine physical strength which stemmed from his lack of it. The former duke became associated with various right-wing paramilitary and political organisations. Rushton wrote that he "became a member and patron of the paramilitary group Coburg Einwohnerwehr, the Viking League and the veterans group Der Stahlhelm. The Viking League had previously been the Organisation Consul in the early 1920s—a group which he also funded and participated in. It was involved in the politically motivated murders of politicians Karl Gareis and Walther Rathenau. Urbach commented that "Though Carl Eduard did not himself murder, he financed murderers". Police reports from the time noted that he and Victoria Adelaide attended speeches in public houses which expressed support for far-right terrorism.

Charles Edward also funded various antisemitic nationalist groups. In 1922, he was invited to a traditional event where the best-performing student leaving a local gymnasium (Note: Academically focused German secondary school) could make a speech. The schoolboy that year was a young Jewish man called Hans Morgenthau. The former duke expressed his disapproval by turning his back to Morgenthau and holding his nose throughout the speech. On 14 October 1922, the Nazi Party participated in a nationalist event called the German Day in Coburg, which involved a significant amount of violence. That evening, Charles Edward attended a meal run by the party where Adolf Hitler spoke. The next day he shook hands with Hitler, becoming the first nobleman to publicly support him. Police investigated whether the former duke had encouraged his oldest son, Leopold, to join the Young German Order, an anti-semitic paramilitary organisation. In the autumn of 1923, it was reported in the press that Leopold had led a series of attacks on Jewish people in the area around Coburg, a number of incidents in the village of Autenhausen where Jewish farmers were seriously injured received particular attention. It was alleged that the former duke had bribed witnesses to protect his son from prosecution.

In 1920, he hid Hermann Ehrhardt, a Freikorps commander and later leader of the Organisation Consul, in one of his castles with a store of weapons, after Ehrhardt participated in the unsuccessful Kapp Putsch against the government. Büschel suggests that Ehrhardt, who was unhappy with Wilhelm and his heir, Crown Prince Wilhelm, may have wanted to make Charles Edward the monarch of the entirety of Germany. In 1923, the value of the German mark collapsed. Both the radical left and right of politics saw this as an opportunity to change the system of government. Communists tried to start a revolution in Thuringia and Saxony. Ehrhart and 5,000 followers—including Charles Edward's eldest son—responded by preparing to march into Thuringia. The federal German government then removed the left-wing state governments in those areas reestablishing its authority from the perspective of public opinion. While Charles Edward was irritated by the unsuccessful Beer Hall Putsch by the Nazi Party a short time later because it disrupted Ehrhart's own attempts to take power—the leader of Bavaria, Gustav von Kahr, had been planning a coup against the federal government with Ehrhart before Hitler began a coup against him—the former duke did hide Nazis in one of his castles afterwards.

=== Early involvement with the Nazi Party ===
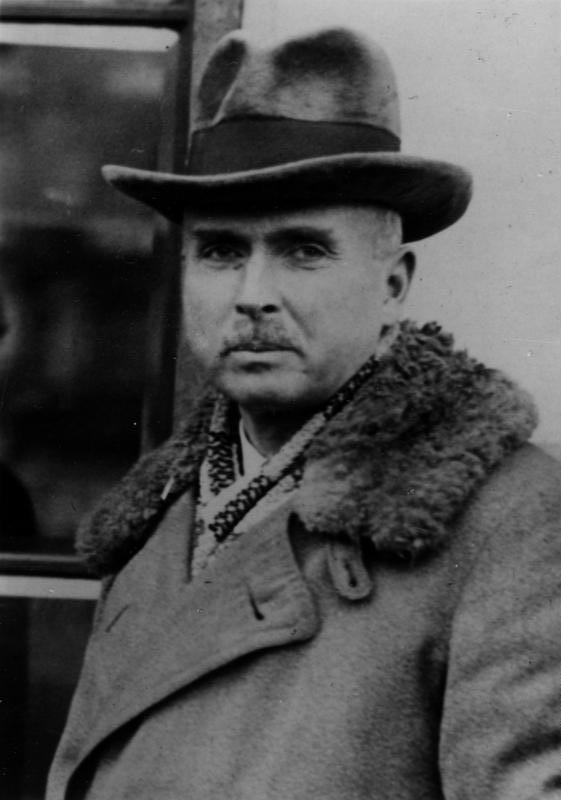
Charles Edward in 1930

From 1929 onward, Charles Edward provided financial support to the Nazi Party. In 1932, Callenberg Castle was renovated with a Swastika added to a tower. The former duke was attracted by the party's militarism and anti-communism. Hitler had also expressed opposition to the expropriation of royal property. Charles Edward was a useful ally for the Nazis in the period before they gained power, with extensive links in Franconia and across Germany.

In 1929, his support contributed to Coburg becoming the first town in Germany to elect a Nazi Party council. The election had taken place due to a dispute about a Nazi supporter being dismissed from his job for attacking Jews. Charles Edward's visits to Nazi party events were covered in the local press, increasing the party's profile and prestige. Following the election of the Nazi Party locally in 1929, politically motivated violence against their opponents became common and tolerated by the local police. The Jewish population of Coburg also experienced growing amounts of physical abuse and discrimination. Rushton writes that the former duke's publicly expressed beliefs and financial support contributed to the growth of hatred towards Jewish people in Coburg and Germany as a whole. A newspaper, published by a German-Jewish organisation, reported in 1929 that Charles Edward and his wife had expressed antisemitic views and held membership of organisations that wished for Jews to be forced out of Germany. According to Rushton, Charles Edward would have been aware of the violent behaviour of the movements he was involved in but never objected. The First World War had convinced him of the merits of political violence.

The former duke and Waldemar Pabst established the "Society for Studying Fascism" in 1931. The organisation was intended to design a plan for governing Germany based on the example of Italian fascism. Mussolini's dictatorship interested Charles Edward and others like him. It seemed to them that fascism was a method of running a country which could merge the traditional aristocracy and a new elite. The former duke was elected leader of the National Klub in 1932. This was a social club which had a membership largely composed of businessmen who disliked the postwar system of government. He encouraged them to join the Nazi Party and by the end of the year 70% had done so. Also in 1932, he took part in the creation of the Harzburg Front, through which the German National People's Party and other groups with similar views became associated with the Nazi Party. He also publicly endorsed Hitler in the presidential election of 1932. While the Nazi party lost that election across Germany, they won in Coburg.

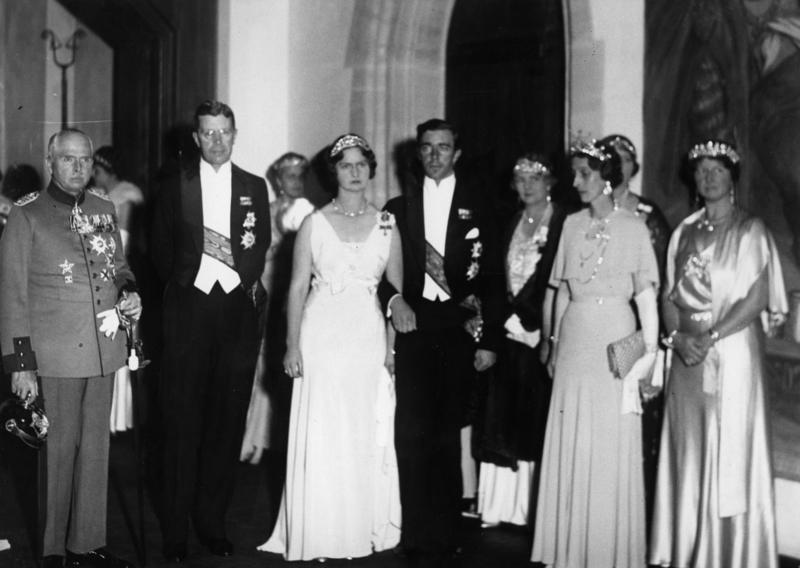
Charles Edward (furthest left) at his daughter's wedding (1932)

In 1932, Charles Edward's daughter Sibylla married Prince Gustaf Adolf, Duke of Västerbotten, the eldest son of the Crown Prince of Sweden and second-in-line to the Swedish throne. The marriage meant that Sibylla would be expected to become Queen of Sweden (which however did not happen). Charles Edward used the event as a public display of his ideology and to improve the damaged prestige of the Duke's family. More than a decade after the First World War it was a chance for them to appear important in international royal circles again. Coburg was decorated with Swedish and Nazi flags. Five thousand men in Nazi uniforms marched outside Veste Coburg. Adolf Hitler and Hermann Göring congratulated the marriage.

George V stopped Edward, Prince of Wales, from attending the wedding due to objections to Charles Edward's political views, although some of Charles Edward's British relatives did attend. In Sweden, which was politically unstable with a growing republican movement, the wedding became controversial due to the symbolism used and as Gustaf was known to have Nazi sympathies. The Swedish government were promised that changes would be made to the programme for the event but these were not fulfilled. The wedding received much coverage in the German and foreign press.

== Membership in the Nazi party ==
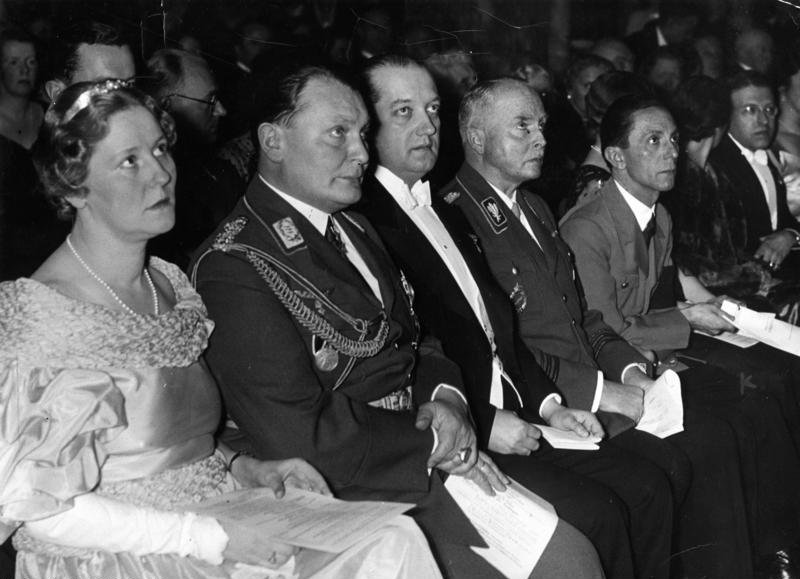
Charles Edward (fourth left, front) seated with Joseph Goebbels, Jozef Lipski, Hermann and Emmy Göring (1935)

In 1933, the Nazi Party came to power in Germany. Charles Edward started flying the Nazi flag over Veste Coburg. He formally joined the Nazi Party in March 1933; he also became an Obergruppenführer in the Sturmabteilung (Storm Division). Meanwhile, a temporary prison was established in the middle of Coburg where Jewish people and opponents of the regime were tortured. No effort was made to keep this secret. The former duke was quickly given various ceremonial titles along with holding positions on the boards of multiple businesses. A photo collection of senior figures in the new regime published by a German private company included him at number 43. Charles Edward stated publicly in 1934 that he would "blindly follow Hitler forever".

According to Urbach, the former duke became a "highly honoured" member of the party, appearing in photographs with its senior members and setting up an office in Berlin which he could use to form relationships. She wrote that he was proud of his Nazi Party membership and that the SA uniform allowed him to feel closer to his pre-war self. He lost the right to use his SA uniform after the Night of the Long Knives, this greatly upset him, but he accepted the politically motivated murders. He was later given a Wehrmacht general's uniform. Some figures within the Nazi Party were suspicious of the former duke, suspecting that he was motivated by ambition or wanted to restore the monarchy. He awarded his own personal medal to a number of Nazi supporters until being stopped by the regime in 1936.

Charles Edward was made president of the National Socialist Automobile Association, an organisation which provided vehicles for the German state, including those used to carry out the Holocaust. From 1936 to 1945, he served as a member of the Reichstag, representing the Nazi Party. In appointment diaries—which he kept from 1932 to 1940—he often expressed his enthusiastic support for the party. For instance, he recorded the results of the 1936 one-party election in detail and praised the outcome. Büschel commented that the former duke appeared to see himself as fully a German by this stage in his life. He described Charles Edward's lifestyle during the period;

[The] importance that Carl Eduard had for the Hitler regime was evident in the luxury of apartments befitting his rank and the amenities of a large fleet of vehicles, diligent adjutants, administrators and servants as well as abundant foreign currency ... Carl Eduard lived more unmolested under National Socialism than in the Weimar Republic at the Coburg Castle and his numerous other castles. The dispute over properties in Thuringia and Austria, which had been confiscated by the state authorities after the end of the First World War, was soon resolved in favour of the ducal family, not least through the intervention of high-ranking National Socialist party members.

=== German Red Cross ===
On 1 December 1933, Charles Edward was appointed head of the Deutsches Rotes Kreuz (German Red Cross). Hitler approved the appointment because he knew the former duke well. He believed that Charles Edward was a supporter of the Nazis' ideas relating to race and eugenics. The former duke's appointment also reflected a historic tradition of aristocrats participating in humanitarian activities. His links to European royalty meant he was considered a useful figurehead for the organisation abroad. He was expected to share power with the German Red Cross's deputy leader Dr Paul Hocheisen. Over the early months of Charles Edward's presidency, a power struggle occurred between the two men as the President tried to assert his authority within the organisation. In the summer of 1934, the party largely transferred control over the German Red Cross to Hocheisen.

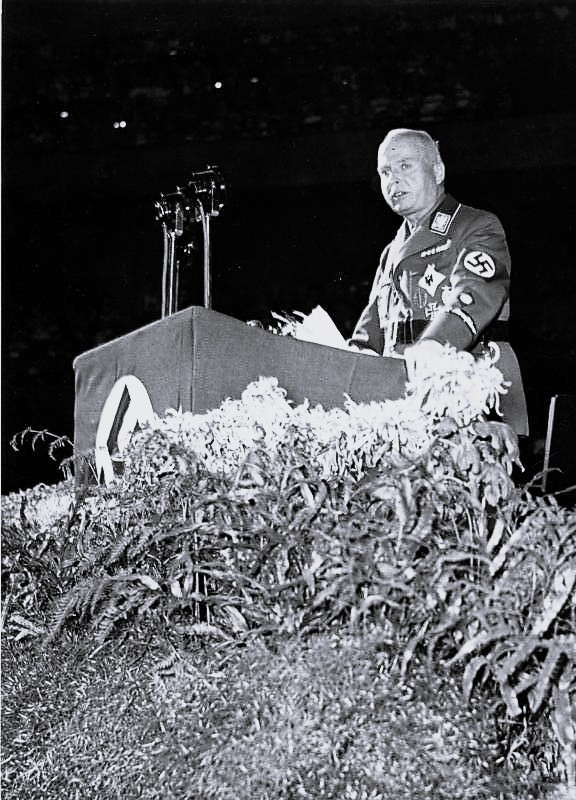
Charles Edward speaking at a meeting of the German Red Cross (1936)

The organisation was quickly made to conform with the government's goals. Rushton commented that "Two years after the founding of the new regime, the DRK [German Red Cross] was remodelled into a paramilitary organization with the goal of providing support for soldiers in a time of conflict". The treatment of political prisoners in Germany became a topic of international discussion in the early years of the regime. After the Swedish Red Cross requested an investigation into the subject in 1934, the International Red Cross began to make enquiries. The German Red Cross claimed that conditions for the prisoners were better than their usual quality of life. Charles Edward helped arrange for his friend, President of the International Red Cross Carl Jacob Burckhardt, to make a tour of the concentration camps in 1935, under the supervision of the regime. This included a visit to Dachau. Burckhardt privately felt that the camps were "brutal", but his report was heavily censored and said that conditions were adequate. Burckhardt wrote to the former duke thanking him for organising the visits.

In 1937, Ernst-Robert Grawitz was appointed deputy leader to increase the organisation's links with the SS. Charles Edward was made "an officer of the chancellery of the Fuhrer", giving him access to private information on government business. The senior roles in the German Red Cross were increasingly filled by Nazi Party members, and members of the organisation were taught that "the Jews, Slavs, chronically ill, handicapped ... were nothing more than worthless". Charles Edward gradually became less prominent in public within Germany during the regime's early years and ceased to make domestic public appearances almost entirely after Grawitz's appointment in 1937. The regime was becoming increasingly radical and saw the former duke as a symbol of the past.

=== Eugenics ===
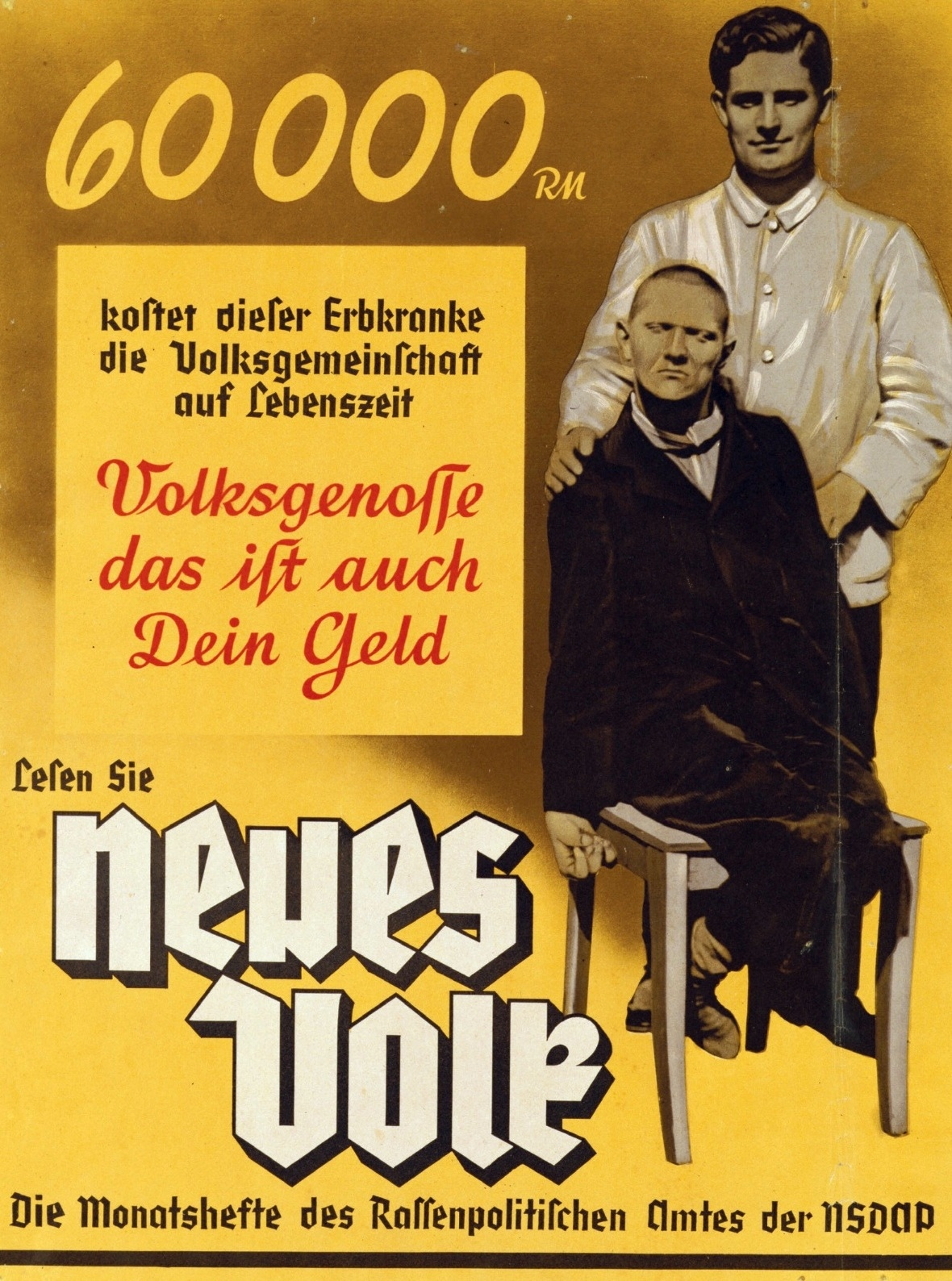
Advertisement promoting the pro-eugenics Nazi magazine Neues Volk (c. 1937). It discusses the cost of disabled people to the German state and taxpayers. (Note: The text means "60,000 Reichsmarks is what this person suffering from hereditary illness costs the community in his lifetime. Fellow citizen, that is your money too. Read Neues Volk. The monthly magazine of the Office of Racial Policy of the NSDAP.")

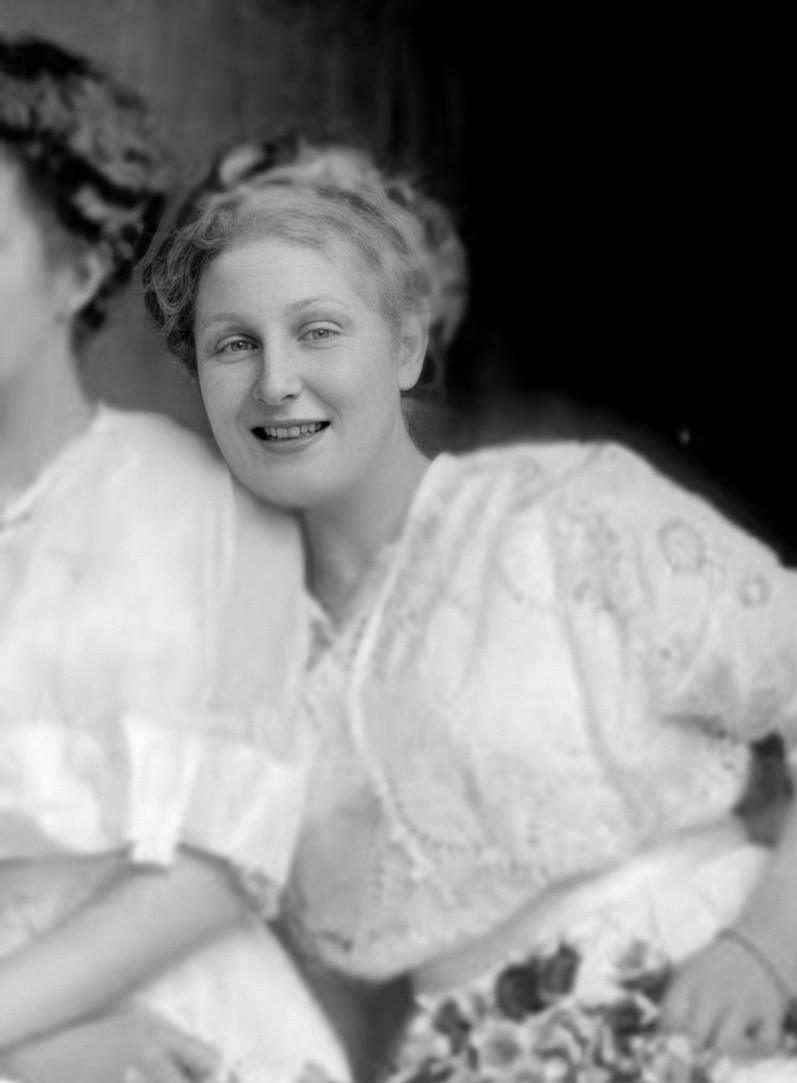
Princess Maria Karoline, a relative of Charles Edward who was murdered in the Aktion T4 programme

Eugenics—the now-discredited theory that a human population can be "improved" over generations by encouraging some people to have children and discouraging others—was a concept that originated in the 19th century and became increasingly popular among German academic circles in the decades before the Nazis came to power. At the start of the 20th century, children born into poorer families tended to be less healthy, and more likely to develop behaviour that was considered destructive, compared with their richer counterparts. Therefore, it made implicit sense to some people that the differences between social classes might be genetic. Anxieties about the genetic health of the German nation were heightened by the First World War when large numbers of able-bodied men were killed or crippled, while men who were incapable of combat remained at home.

Growing amounts of scientific research into eugenics took place over subsequent years and Hitler endorsed the idea during the 1920s. The Great Depression intensified concern that disabled people were a drain on public resources, with scientists and non-Nazi politicians increasingly discussing the idea of voluntary sterilisation for these groups. The Nazi Party expressed strong support for eugenics during the early 1930s. In the early twentieth century, eugenic ideas received wide international support across the political spectrum and eugenic policies such as compulsory sterilisation of "defectives" were introduced in several countries. The theory lost mainstream support after the Second World War because of its use by the Nazis to justify mass murder.

Charles Edward was on the governing body of the Kaiser Wilhelm Institute from 1933 to 1945. He was secretary of its executive board from 1934 to 1937. In those positions, he was involved in promoting eugenicist ideas to the German public, particularly to individuals with power in German society. The Law for the Prevention of Genetically Diseased Offspring introduced mandatory sterilisation for certain groups of people who were deemed an unwanted burden on the German nation. The German government organised multiple schemes to murder disabled people later on in the regime's reign. The first scheme, targeted at children, ran from 1939 to the end of the war and killed 5,300 disabled children. The second scheme, which ran from late 1939 to mid-1941, killed more than 70,000 disabled people at six killing centres in Germany and Austria—mainly through gassing. Grawitz was heavily involved in this. In August 1941, this scheme was stopped, as it was felt to be upsetting the German people and undermining their motivation in wartime. A third scheme in the later years of war used more covert methods—to a large extent deliberate starvation. It is estimated to have killed between 100,000 and 180,000 people.

Most evidence which could clarify the level of involvement of the German Red Cross in these events was destroyed, accidentally or deliberately, by the end of the war. While most transportation of victims was done by a proxy organisation created for that purpose, the German Red Cross was involved in transporting some of them. Many of the nurses who were involved in murdering disabled people were employees of the German Red Cross who had been indoctrinated by the organisation. Rushton believed that Charles Edward would have known about these schemes. He was a heavy consumer of media and had many social connections. Evidence collected by the regime at the time and later studies have suggested that it was common knowledge among the German population.

Princess Maria Karoline, a member of the former duke's extended family, was murdered by the programme in 1941—even though upper-class disabled people generally had a degree of protection due to their use of private healthcare and their families' political connections. According to Rushton, Charles Edward had not intervened because "he had not been concerned that anything would happen to her". He received a letter of condolence stating that she had died of natural causes. He did not believe this explanation or comments by his staff that others had been gassed at Hartheim Castle. Unusually for a man who rarely missed family events, he did not attend the funeral.

=== Unofficial diplomat ===
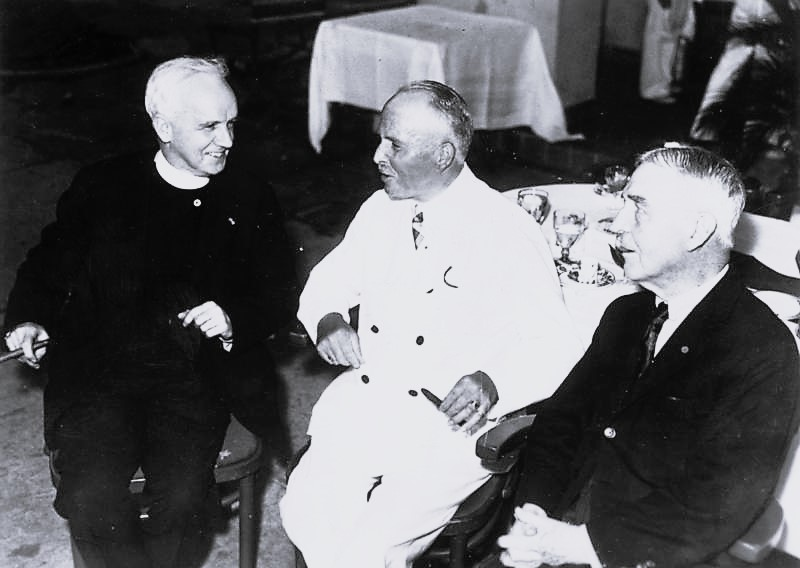
Charles Edward (centre) with John Barton Payne, Chairman of the American Red Cross in Hawaii, United States (1934)

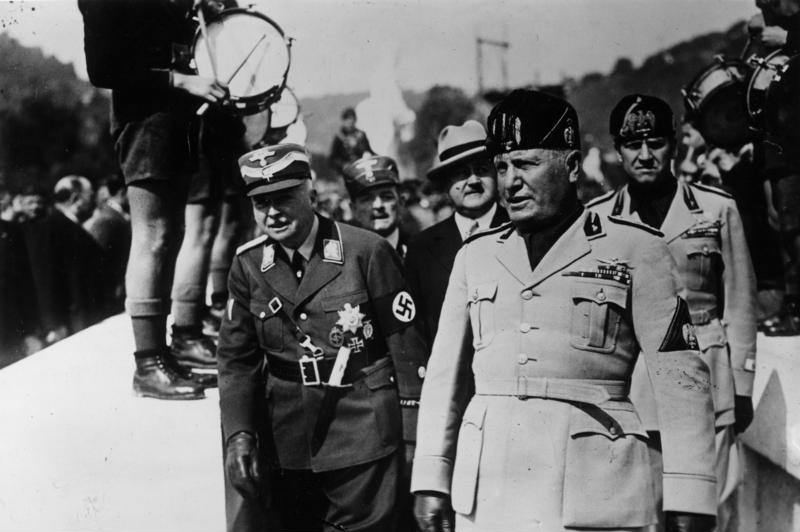
Charles Edward (front left) with Italian dictator Benito Mussolini on a visit to Rome (1938)

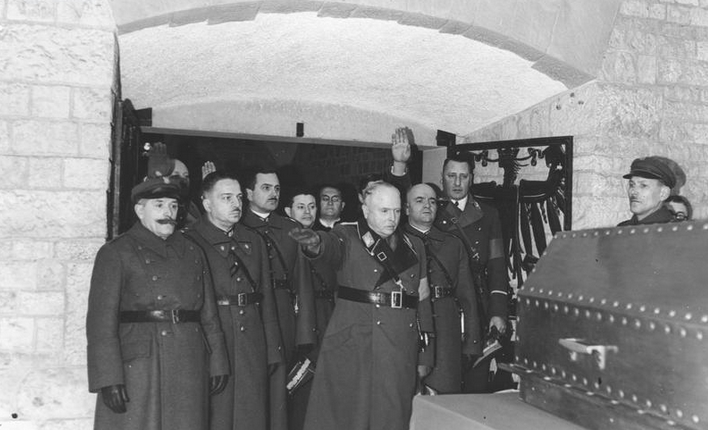
Charles Edward (front, third right) visiting Wawel Castle (1939)

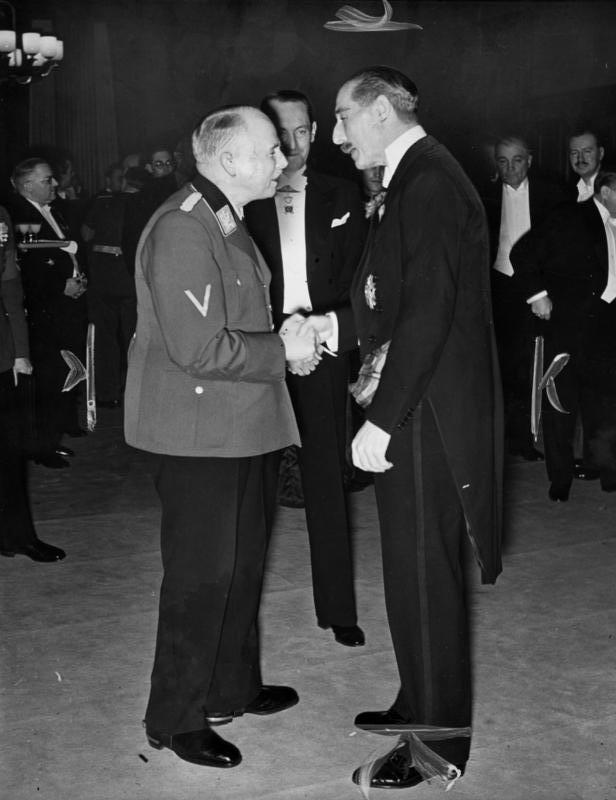
Charles Edward (left), in a uniform including the Nazi "Old Guard" arm-chevron, meeting British ambassador to Germany, Sir Nevile Henderson, in 1939 (Note: Charles Edward had been at Eton with Henderson and this photograph may have been taken at a meeting of the Anglo-German Fellowship that Henderson addressed in May 1937, shortly after his appointment as British ambassador.)

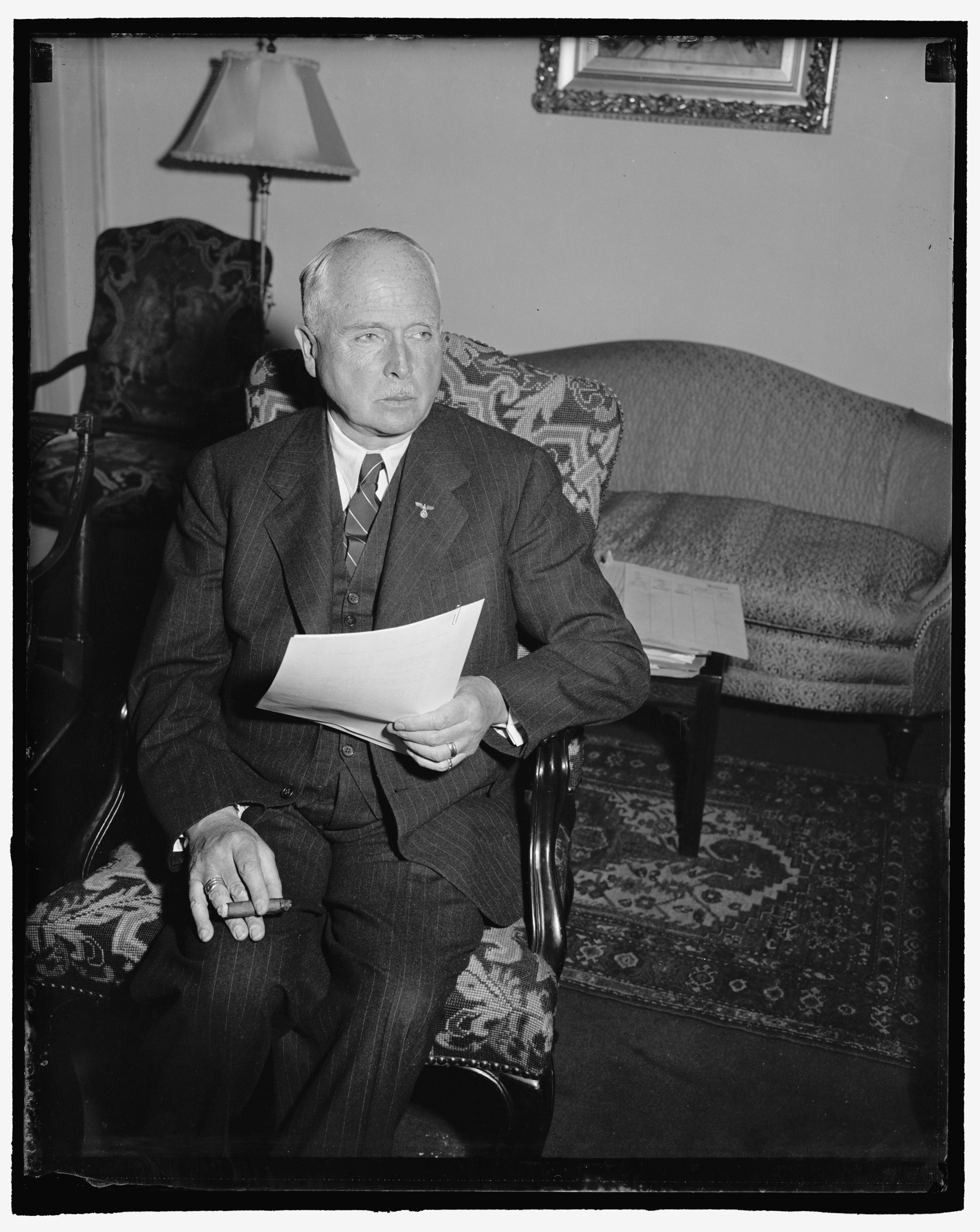
Charles Edward on a visit to Washington, D.C., United States (1940)

The Nazi regime made significant use of Charles Edward as an informal diplomat. While the German Red Cross was essentially under the control of the regime, it was presented to a foreign audience as an independent humanitarian organisation. The former duke had little power over its domestic governance but acted as a significant international figurehead. Charles Edward made his first worldwide tour on behalf of the new German government in 1934. He visited Japan, where he attended a conference on the protection of civilians during war and delivered Hitler's birthday greeting to Emperor Hirohito. The conference allowed Charles Edward to be seen by a global audience as a humanitarian figure, improving the regime's international reputation. Hitler was interested in an alliance with the Japanese government and Charles Edward used the visit to develop links with the Japanese royal family. In a report he wrote about the tour for Hitler, the former duke often expressed prejudiced views and complained about perceived Jewish influence in the United States.

Charles Edward was particularly significant to Nazi attempts to cultivate pro-German sentiments among the British aristocracy. Urbach commented that Charles Edward went on "endless reconnaissance trips [to Britain] in the 1930s". He wanted to help the German government establish an alliance with the British and also have Claremont House returned to him personally. Urbach wrote that Charles Edward reintegrated himself into aristocratic social life in Britain, with the help of his sister, and associated with prominent aristocrats and politicians. These people included Neville Chamberlain, who became British prime minister in 1937, and the British royal family—especially Edward, Prince of Wales who had strongly pro-German views. The former duke was president of the Deutsch-Englische Gesellschaft (German–English society) and lobbied Britons believed to be pro-German. He was made head of the organisation after the regime decided that it was not pro-Nazi enough. He attended George V's funeral in a German military uniform and helmet. He also visited veterans' meetings in the United Kingdom. The British Secretary of State for War, Duff Cooper described a party that was organised on Charles Edward's behalf at Alice's country home in 1936;

The point of it was to meet the Duke of Coburg, her brother. It was a gloomy little party—so like a German bourgeois household ... I was tactfully left alone with the Duke of Coburg after luncheon in order that he might explain to me the present situation in Germany and assure me of Hitler's pacific intentions. In the middle of our conversation his Duchess [Victoria Adelaide] reappeared carrying some hideous samples of ribbon in order to consult him as to how the wreath that they were sending to the funeral [of George V's] should be tied. He dismissed her with a volley of muttered German curses and was afterwards unable to pick up the thread of his argument.

Zeepvat argued that Charles Edward's advocacy had little success and that he failed to understand the degree to which the people he had grown up around by this time saw him as a foreigner. In contrast, Urbach argued in her 2015 book that the strains experienced by British society during the interwar period had a radicalising effect on sections of the British elite and that there was significant sympathy for fascism—albeit discomfort with Nazism in particular—among the aristocracy. She suggested that Charles Edward may have had some influence on instances of appeasement of Germany in the 1930s, such as the Anglo-German Naval Agreement, British acceptance of the German remilitarisation of the Rhineland and the Munich Agreement.

Charles Edward hosted an international press tour associated with the Duke and Duchess of Windsor's visit to Germany in 1937. He also hosted Edward and Wallis Simpson themselves during their visit. He visited Italy in 1938, meeting King Victor Emmanuel III and dictator Benito Mussolini. He went on a trip to Poland where he met Polish officials half a year before the country was invaded by Germany and the Soviet Union.

In 1940, Charles Edward travelled through Moscow and Japan to the US, where he met President Roosevelt at the White House. He claimed that the German Red Cross was protecting the welfare of the recently conquered Polish people. The American Red Cross was quite hostile to the visit and there was some criticism in US newspapers—overall, however, he was fairly well received in the US press. In a private report, the German embassy in Washington claimed that the Duke's personal appeal had prevented the visit from going badly wrong diplomatically for the Germans. The former duke signed an agreement with the American Red Cross allowing them to send humanitarian aid to Poland, though much of this was ultimately confiscated by the SS. In Japan, he worked to improve relations between the German and Japanese governments after the Molotov-Ribbentrop pact had caused a dispute between them. He went on a visit to Japanese-occupied Manchukuo—touring hospitals and similar institutions with journalists. Büschel suggests that this was likely an attempt, by the Japanese authorities, to convince world opinion that people in Manchukuo were being given suitable humanitarian assistance by their new rulers.

=== Second World War ===
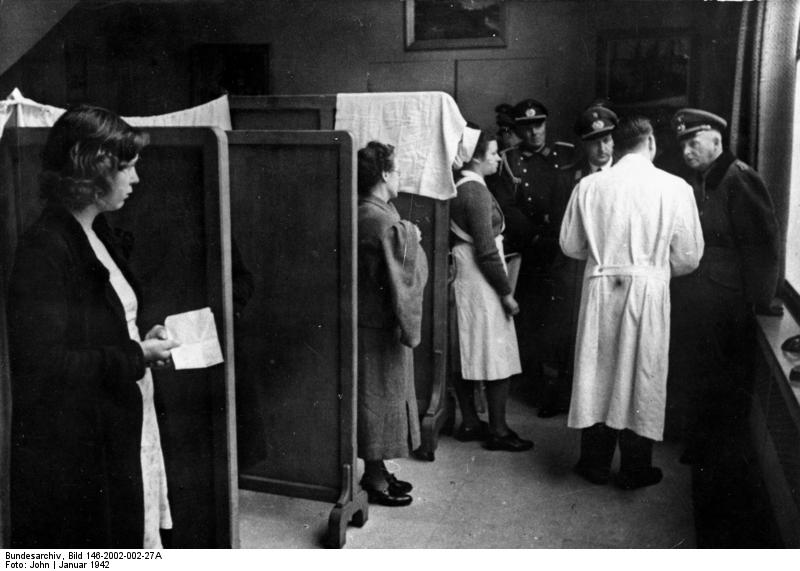
Charles Edward (furthest right) visiting a German Red Cross facility in France where local women travelling to Germany to work were medically inspected (1942)

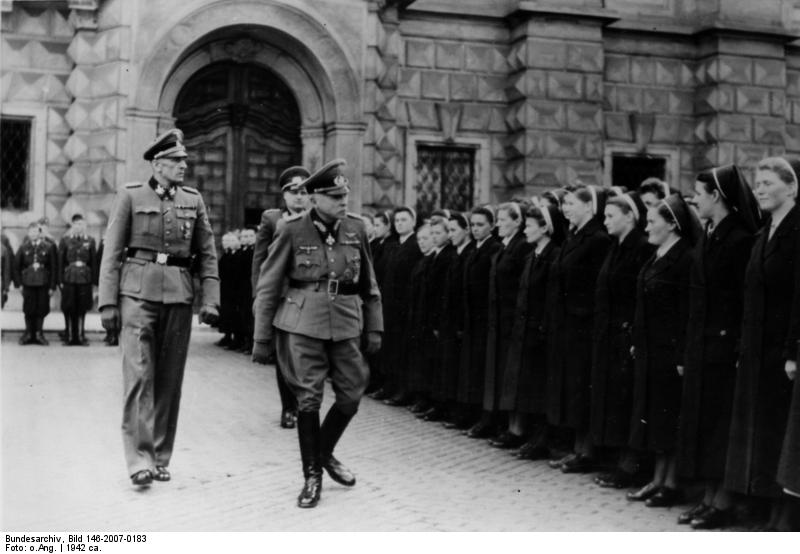
Charles Edward (front) visiting German Red Cross facilities in Prague, then part of the German-controlled Protectorate of Bohemia and Moravia (1942)

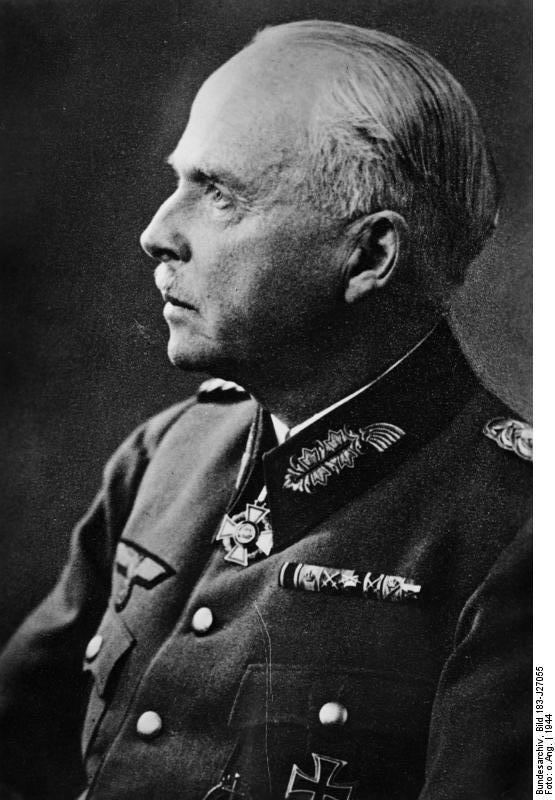
Portrait of Charles Edward (1944)

Charles Edward was again on the opposite side of a war to his birth country when the Second World War broke out in 1939—there is no evidence that it caused him any distress or led him to doubt his political convictions. Although the former duke was too old for active service, his three sons served in the Wehrmacht. In 1941, he began to use a diary to note down news about the war, using different coloured pens for different sources of information. When his son Hubertus died in an air crash in 1943, he noted in the diary "Hubertus † fürs Vaterland" (Hubertus died for the Fatherland). He underlined the shorthand cross for death in the colour he used for reports from the Wehrmacht. In 1942, Charles Edward was asked by his relative Prince Eugene of Sweden to arrange for Martha Liebermann, an elderly Jewish woman, to be granted permission to emigrate to the United States. He did nothing to help and Liebermann later took her own life after being ordered to report for deportation to Theresienstadt Ghetto.

Charles Edward's support for Nazism grew more intense during the war years and never relented. Hitler considered making him King of Norway after the war. The former duke probably ceased to act as an informal diplomat after 1940. His health was declining and he appeared older than his years. He continued to wear uniforms and travelled to countries that were occupied by Germany, members of the Axis powers, or neutral. A 1941 edition of Les Actualités mondiales, a newsreel circulated in German-occupied France, discussed him visiting the Tomb of the Unknown Soldier and facilities used by the German Red Cross in France. Travelling abroad was a privilege afforded to few German civilians during the war years. It is unclear what Charles Edward was doing politically during that period, but he was being paid 4,000 Reichsmarks a month by the German government, from a fund Hitler had organised for associates who were useful to him. In 1940, the former duke helped mediate a diplomatic dispute between the British and German governments about the treatment of prisoners of war, stopping a number of prisoners on both sides from being shackled. In 1943, at Hitler's behest, Charles Edward asked the International Red Cross to investigate the Katyn massacre.

In April 1945, code-breakers at Bletchley Park deciphered an order from Hitler stating that Charles Edward should not be allowed to be captured. According to Urbach, that meant Hitler wanted him killed. That month, Charles Edward agreed to the surrender of Veste Coburg to US forces. He gained their assistance in putting out a fire in the castle museum which had been started by the bombardment. He was on the US Army's list of suspected war criminals, and was put under house arrest, until being moved to a prisoner of war camp in November. He was questioned and drank wine with his captors in one of the castle's sitting rooms. His interrogators saw him as ignorant, obnoxious and possibly mentally unstable. He said in an interview that he would accept an offer to participate in a new German government, made a series of demands relating to the idea, and claimed that "no German is guilty of any war crimes". The comments were deemed so useful for Allied propaganda that they were used in a radio broadcast in April 1945. He also expressed the view that it had been right to remove Jews from public life and that Germans were naturally unsuited to democracy.

== Postwar period and death ==
=== Trial and final years ===
After the end of the Second World War, Charles Edward was interned by the American military authorities from 1945 to 1946. His sister lobbied for his release on health grounds. After his release, he and Victoria Adelaide moved into a cottage outside Callenberg Castle. The castle was being used as a home for refugees. Alice visited the couple in 1948; according to her account, they were impoverished and her brother was severely unwell with arthritis. She persuaded the authorities to let them move into part of one of his residences, closer to where her sister-in-law could buy food.

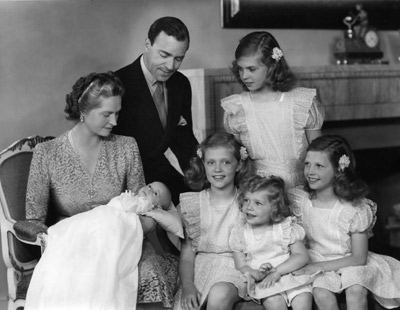
Charles Edward's daughter Sibylla with her husband and children (1946)

In April 1946, Charles Edward's daughter Sibylla gave birth to a son, Carl Gustaf, who at birth was third in the line of succession to the Swedish throne. In January 1947, Sibylla's husband died in a plane crash, and in October 1950, Gustaf V of Sweden died, at which point Charles Edward's grandson became Crown Prince of Sweden, later becoming King Carl XVI Gustaf.

Charles Edward's trial spanned four years and included two appeals. Alice and many other associates dishonestly spoke on his behalf, minimising his involvement in the regime. A year or so after the war, the priority of the Western Allies had shifted away from punishing former Nazis towards preparing their occupation zones to become part of the Western Bloc during the Cold War. In 1950 (or August 1949, according to his ODNB entry), the former duke was found by a denazification court to be a Mitläufer and Minderbelasteter (roughly: 'follower' and 'follower of lesser guilt'). The former duke's biographer Carl Sandler called the result a "farce". Charles Edward also lost significant property due to his participation in the Second World War. His property in Gotha, situated in the Soviet occupation zone, was confiscated and redistributed.

Charles Edward spent the last years of his life in seclusion, forced into relative poverty by the fines he had been required to pay by the denazification tribunal, and the seizure of much of his property by the Soviets. However, his lifestyle to a large extent returned to normal after his trial. In 1953, he was taken by ambulance and wheelchair to view the coronation of Queen Elizabeth II of the United Kingdom at a cinema in Coburg. He reportedly appeared to be close to crying while watching his relatives, including his sister. According to a column published that year in The Scotsman, the former duke had reestablished links with the Seaforth Highlanders, a British Army regiment of which he had once been colonel-in-chief, which was now stationed in Germany. The column commented that:

On the occasion of a regimental ball, an invitation was sent to the Duke, with a note from the C.O. (Lieut.-Colonel P. J. Johnston) saying that, owing to the distance, it was doubtful if he would be able to attend, but it was the wish of all officers of the battalion that their old Colonel-in-Chief should be asked. The Duke replied that, although his health did not allow him to accept, he was deeply touched by the invitation, "renewing old connections which existed between the Seaforth Highlanders and myself for so many years, and which I honestly hope and wish will not be severed again". He said he would be pleased to receive as guest any comrade who should happen to pass Coburg, where he lives, and signed himself "Charles Edward. Duke of Saxe-Coburg-Gotha, Duke of Albany."

=== Death ===
Charles Edward died of cancer at his flat in Coburg on 6 March 1954, at the age of 69. He had reportedly told his son Friedrich Josias that Queen Victoria had always wanted him to be a "good German". His obituary in The Times commented that "... he was Hitler's man ... Whether, and to what extent, he was admitted to the inner council of the Nazi gang is as yet an open question." Representatives of various royal houses across Europe sent condolences but the British royal family did not comment.

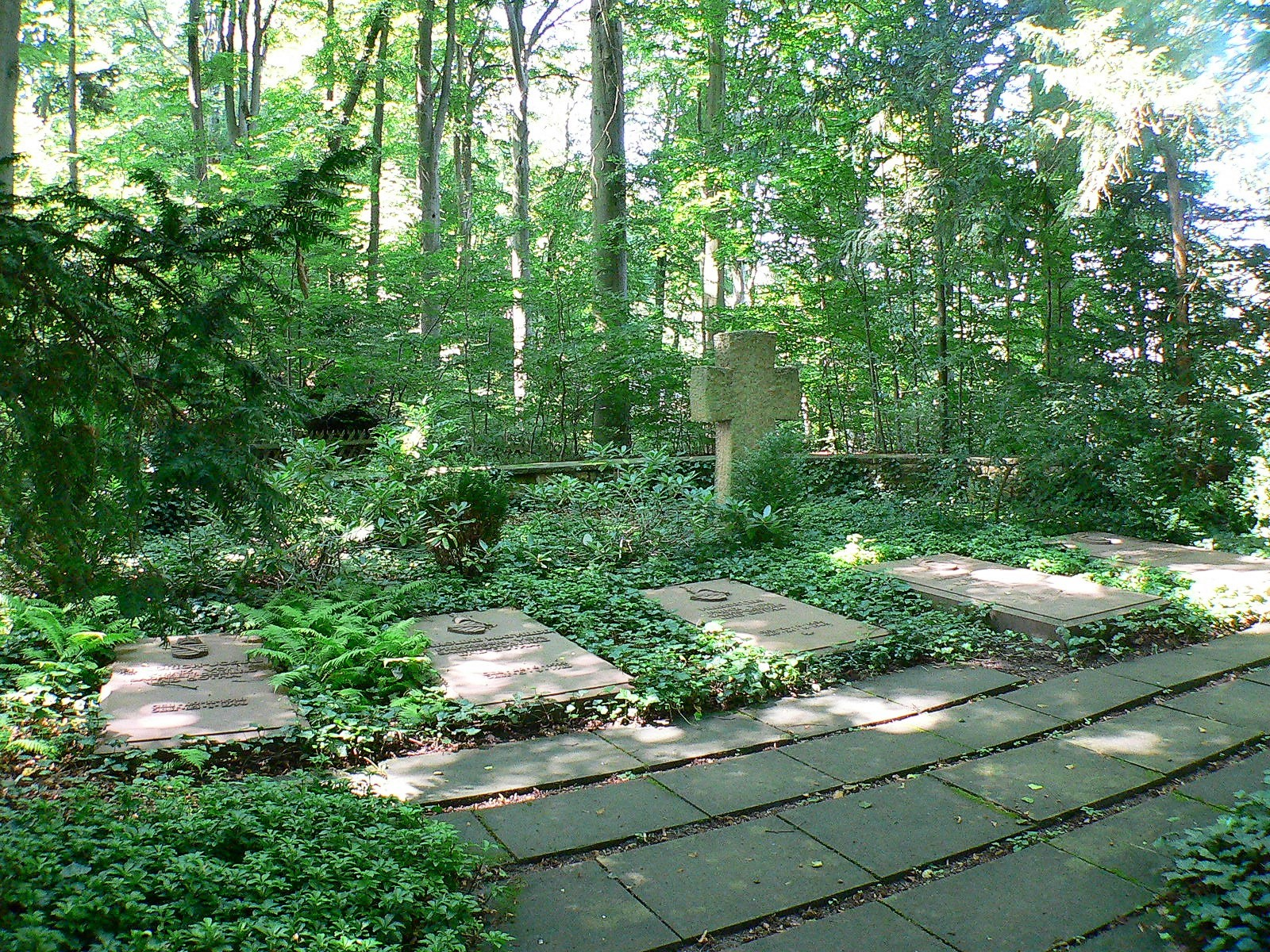
Burial site near Callenberg Castle

Charles Edward's funeral was held on 10 March and presided over by a Lutheran dean who had been a church official under the Nazi regime. He said Charles Edward was a good man who had been manipulated by others and mistreated by the Allies. The former duke's death was officially mourned in Coburg. A civil servant who refused to fly a flag at half mast for his funeral was reported to the district council in Bayreuth and condemned by a member of the Parliament of Bavaria. In the weeks after her husband's death, Victoria Adelaide received many letters from supporters, including former senior Nazis. Charles Edward's burial took place on 12 October, watched by a crowd of well-wishers. He is buried at Callenberg Castle, in the Beiersdorf district of Coburg.

== Honours and arms ==
Charles Edward became His Royal Highness (as male-line grandson of Queen Victoria) Duke of Albany, Earl of Clarence, and Baron Arklow from birth as the posthumous son of Prince Leopold. He inherited the Duchy of Saxe-Coburg and Gotha on 30 July 1900 following the death of his uncle Alfred. His British titles (including HRH) were formally removed by the Titles Deprivation Act 1917, effective 28 March 1919, due to his service on the German side during World War I.

=== Military ranks ===
- Honorary Colonel, 1st Battalion, The Cameronians (Scottish Rifles) – United Kingdom, 1900–1915
- General of Infantry, Prussian Army – Appointed 1911

=== Honours ===
==== United Kingdom (revoked 1915) ====
- Knight of the Garter (KG) – 1902
- Knight Grand Cross of the Royal Victorian Order (GCVO) – 1901
- Privy Counsellor – Appointed 1901

These honours were annulled in 1915 after Charles Edward sided with Germany during the First World War.

==== German Empire and Saxon duchies ====
- Sovereign & Grand Cross of the Saxe-Ernestine House Order (Saxe-Coburg and Gotha)
- Knight of the Order of the Black Eagle (Prussia) 11.10.1905
- Grand Cross of the Order of the White Falcon (Saxe-Weimar)
- Grand Cross of the Order of the Wendish Crown (Mecklenburg)
- Pour le Mérite – 1915
- Iron Cross (1914), 1st and 2nd Class

==== Foreign honours ====
- Grand Cross of the Royal Norwegian Order of St. Olav (Norway) – 1906
- Knight of the Order of the Elephant (Denmark)
- Grand Cross of the Order of the Crown of Italy (Italy)

=== Arms ===
==== Dynastic arms (1900–1954) ====
Heraldic shield of Charles Edward's father, Prince Leopold, as a British prince

Despite being a male-line grandson of Queen Victoria, and succeeding to the dukedom of Albany and its subsidiary titles at birth in 1884, Charles Edward was never granted arms in the United Kingdom. He also did not inherit the arms of his father, Prince Leopold, since British royal arms, as a differenced version of Arms of Dominion, are granted individually and not inherited.

On his accession as reigning Duke of Saxe-Coburg and Gotha in 1900, Charles Edward used his father's arms inverted, as follows: the arms of the Duchy of Saxony charged with an inescutcheon of the royal arms of the United Kingdom differenced with a label argent of three points, the centre point charged with a red cross and each outer point with a red heart.

Blazon: *Quarterly, I and IV Gules three lions passant guardant in pale Or (England), II Or a lion rampant within a double tressure flory counter-flory Gules (Scotland), III Azure a harp Or stringed Argent (Ireland); the whole differenced by a label of three points Argent, the centre point charged with a cross Gules, the outer points each with a heart Gules.*

This design was similar in meaning to the arms borne by his uncle, Alfred, after he became reigning Duke of Saxe-Coburg and Gotha in 1893. Since 1918, Charles Edward's arms have been used as courtesy arms only.

==== Territorial arms (1900–1918) ====
As Duke of Saxe-Coburg and Gotha, Charles Edward was entitled to the traditional arms of that duchy. The full arms consisted of a quartered shield displaying the various Ernestine duchies and the Saxon arms, including:

- The green crancelin of Saxony on a field of gold and black stripes
- Inescutcheons for Coburg and Gotha
- The ducal hat and insignia

The quartered shield reflected his sovereign status in the German Empire.

Charles Edward's dynastic arms as Duke of Saxe-Coburg-Gotha

Charles Edward's standard as Duke of Saxe-Coburg-Gotha

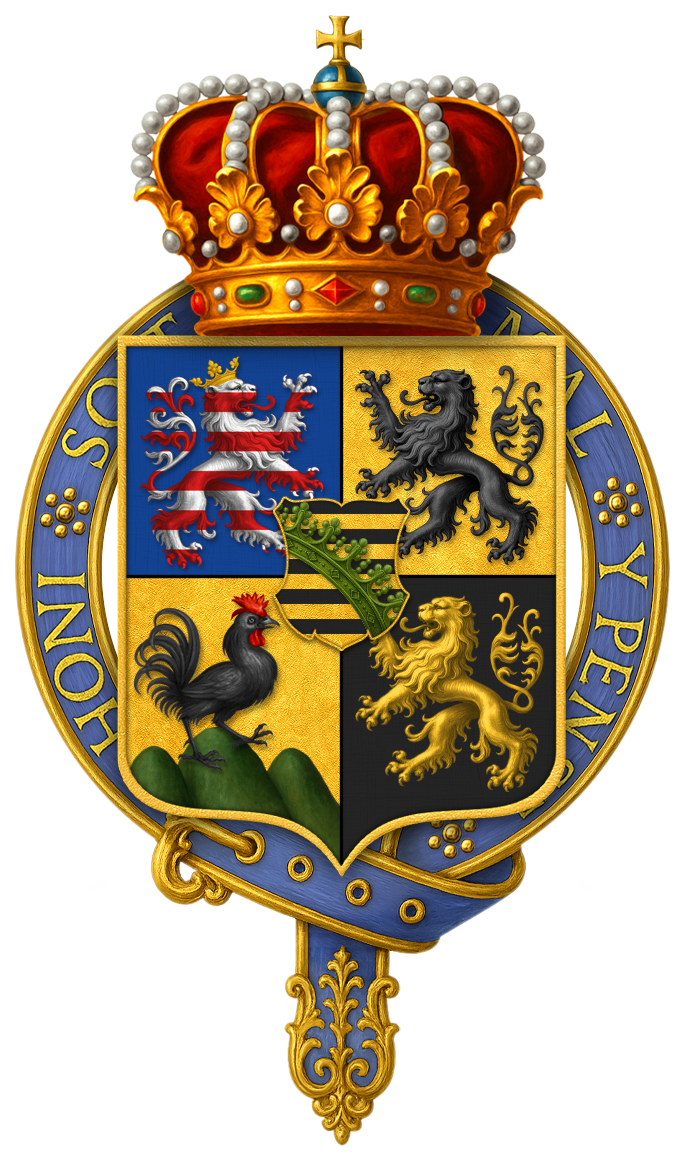
Charles Edward's territorial arms as Duke of Saxe Coburg and Gotha and a Knight of the Garter

==== Monograms ====
Monogram as Duke of Albany

Monogram as Duke of Saxe-Coburg-Gotha

Monogram as Duke of Saxe-Coburg-Gotha

== Legacy ==
=== Family perceptions ===
His sister's autobiography For My Grandchildren (1966) discusses Charles Edward's life. She felt that her brother had been a victim of prejudice during the First World War and only chose to stay in Germany due to his family. She suggested that he had a minimal role in the Nazi regime. Urbach argued that the autobiography is intentionally misleading and selective. In his biography of Alice, published in 1981, Aronson commented that some members of the British royal family felt that Charles Edward had supported the regime "due to his conviction that Hitler had saved Germany from Communism". He wrote that Alice felt that her brother had been poorly treated while imprisoned after the end of the war—"he found conditions almost unbearable. ... Many of his fellow prisoners died there ..."—but also told him "No doubt, their jailers had seen some of the ghastly German concentration camps and were determined to treat these old officers with the utmost severity".

Rudolf Preisner, an amateur historian from Coburg, wrote the first biography of Charles Edward's life in 1977. The former duke's son Friedrich Josias wrote a letter to Preisner criticising the book. Among other errors, he felt that the book was overly sympathetic to his father, who he believed knew about the Holocaust. He wrote that his brother, Hubertus, had witnessed deportations of Jewish people to extermination camps and often talked about the subject with the family. Friedrich Josias planned to write a biography about his father but never did so.

=== 21st-century portrayals ===
In December 2007, Britain's Channel 4 aired an hour-long documentary called Hitler's Favourite Royal about Charles Edward. A review in The Guardian described the film as "A solid documentary on a feeble man and a wretched family." Another review in The Daily Telegraph suggested the documentary had been overly sympathetic to Charles Edward, stating that the "story emerged as a tale of pure tragedy. Which it undoubtedly was, in parts", but that he was depicted "as if the trauma of being elevated to a dukedom and losing it had somehow robbed him of his ability to tell right from wrong."

Urbach wrote that there was some disagreement among the production team of the 2007 documentary, on whether Charles Edward should be portrayed as a man who struggled with politics in a country that was foreign to him, or as an ideological Nazi, and that this led to a contradictory depiction of his character. She said that the recovery of new evidence during the period between 2007 and 2015 showed that he was "obviously not a naive victim of circumstances but a very active supporter of Hitler". Urbach argued that Charles Edward had a similar kind of character to Hitler, commenting that the two men shared "ideologies and of course their narcissistic personalities (the only creatures they both declared a fondness for were their dogs)." She also described his life as "an example of thorough re-education ... away from the constitutional monarchy he was reared in to dictatorship." Urbach's 2015 book Go Betweens for Hitler discusses how various aristocrats including Charles Edward acted as informal diplomats for Nazi Germany. A review in The Times commented on Charles Edward that:

For many years thereafter [the German Revolution], Carl Eduard was regarded as a mere footnote in history; a harmless, potty old aristocrat, washed up by the seismic upheavals of the early 20th century. However, that benign interpretation has been recently revised. We now know that Carl Eduard was a member of the Nazi Party, a sponsor of paramilitary terrorism and—as Urbach's excellent book demonstrates—an important 'go-between' for Hitler.

Büschel suggested in his 2016 biography of Charles Edward that the various pressures placed on the nobleman from childhood until the outcome of the First World War may have led to him developing split personality disorder and narcissism. The writer argues that the Nazi regime allowed the former duke to regain much of the status he had lost after the First World War. He commented that Charles Edward was influenced by "coercion, fear, indoctrination, the effort to "stay on top", and probably also inner homelessness and loneliness". He suggests this was similar to many of the Duke's German contemporaries. However, Büschel believed that Charles Edward freely chose to support the Nazi regime when the option of leaving Germany would have been fairly easy for him. He wrote that the former duke was the most active and enthusiastic of the regime's aristocratic supporters. He describes Charles Edward as a "second-tier perpetrator": someone who was not a central figure in the regime, but who helped to conceal policies that would lead to the deaths of millions of people.

Rushton, in his 2018 book about the former duke's relationship to the murder of disabled people, described Charles Edward's life as "the story of a man born to royalty who became ensnared in the politics of human destruction. It is a tragic story." Rushton suggested there would have been risks to Charles Edward and his family if he had chosen to object to any actions of the regime, giving examples of other former nobles who were persecuted. Rushton noted that Charles Edward had already lost his status as a British prince and German duke, making his new identity as a Nazi party leader deeply emotionally important to him. Rushton argued that the factors affecting Charles Edward's behaviour were similar to many Germans. However, the historian also noted that the former duke had a close friendship with Hitler, and argued that he could have encouraged Hitler to stop certain atrocities. The writer felt that Charles Edward's failure to respond to the murder of a member of his extended family indicated that he was "weak-willed". He argued that this "... reflects a moral character defect... low self-esteem and little self-respect ... [lack of action is often due to] fear of others' opinions in the community and the risk to one's comfortable and secure lifestyle".

In 2015, a local dispute took place in Coburg about whether a street should be named after Max Brose, a businessman who had links to the Nazi regime. In response to this, the Coburg town council commissioned a group of historians to investigate why support for the Nazis had developed unusually quickly in Coburg and events in the town during the period. The commission, which reported its findings in 2024, noted that Charles Edward was an influential figure in the town, and that his support for Volkisch organisations contributed to the growth of far-right politics.

== Bibliography ==
- Allen, Garland E. (2004). "Was Nazi Eugenics Created in the US?". EMBO Reports. 5 (5): 451–452. doi:10.1038/sj.embor.7400158. PMC 1299061.
- Aronson, Theo (1981). Princess Alice, Countess of Athlone. Cassell. ISBN 9780304307579.
- Brader, Claire (10 February 2022). "Peerages: Can They Be Removed?". House of Lords Library.
- Baker, G. J. (2014). "Christianity and Eugenics: The Place of Religion in the British Eugenics Education Society and the American Eugenics Society, c. 1907–1940". Social History of Medicine. 27 (2): 281–302. doi:10.1093/shm/hku008. PMC 4001825. PMID 24778464.
- Barrett, Deborah; Kurzman, Charles (October 2004). "Globalizing Social Movement Theory: The Case of Eugenics". Theory and Society. 33 (5): 487–527. doi:10.1023/b:ryso.0000045719.45687.aa. JSTOR 4144884. S2CID 143618054.
- Burke, Bernard; Burke, John (1885). Genealogical and Heraldic Dictionary of the Peerage and Baronetage of the British Empire. Vol. 47. Burke's Peerage Limited.
- Büschel, Hubertus (2016). Hitlers adliger Diplomat [Hitler's Royal Diplomat] (in German). S. Fischer Verlag. ISBN 9783100022615.
- Cadbury, Deborah (10 March 2015). Princes at War: The Bitter Battle Inside Britain's Royal Family in the Darkest Days of WWII. PublicAffairs. ISBN 9781610394048.
- Clark, Christopher (2009). Kaiser Wilhelm II: A Life in Power. Penguin.
- Feuchtwanger, E. J. (January 2006). Albert and Victoria: The Rise and Fall of the House of Saxe-Coburg-Gotha. A&C Black. ISBN 9781852854614.
- Facius, Friedrich (1977). "Karl Eduard". Neue Deutsche Biographie (in German).
- Grand-Carteret, John (1906). "L'oncle de l'Europe" devant l'objectif caricatural : images anglaises, françaises, italiennes, allemandes, autrichiennes, hollandaises, belges, suisses, espagnoles, portugaises, américaines, etc ["The Uncle of Europe" as an Object of Caricature – Images From English, French, Italian, German, Austrian, Dutch, Belgian, Swiss, Spanish, Portuguese, American, etc.] (in French). L. Michaud – via Getty Research Institute.
- Hawkins, Mike (1997). Social Darwinism in European and American Thought. Cambridge University Press. pp. 62, 292. ISBN 9780521574341.
- Henderson, Neville (1940). Failure of a Mission: Berlin 1937–1939. Arcole Publishing. ISBN 9781789127850.
- Huberty, Michel (1976). L'Allemagne Dynastique, Tome I. Le Perreux.
- Larman, Alexander (18 October 2025). "Prince Andrew has Embarrassed The Firm. But at Least he isn't a Nazi". The Telegraph.
- Mangan, Lucy (7 December 2007). "Last Night's TV". The Guardian. Archived from the original on 6 October 2014.
- Morgenbrod, Birgitt; Merkenich, Stephanie (1 January 2008). Das Deutsche Rote Kreuz unter der NS-Diktatur 1933-1945 [The German Red Cross under the Nazi Dictatorship 1933-1945] (in German). Brill Schöningh. doi:10.30965/9783657765294_013. ISBN 978-3-657-76529-4.
- Moorhouse, Roger (18 July 2015). "Go Betweens for Hitler by Karina Urbach". The Times.
- Mott, Sophia (2019). Dem Paradies so fern. Martha Liebermann [So Far From Paradise. Martha Liebermann] (in German). Ebersbach & Simon. ISBN 9783869151724.
- O'Donovan, Gerald (7 December 2007). "Last Night on Television: Hitler's Favourite Royal (Channel 4) – Spoil (Channel 4)". The Daily Telegraph.
- Oltmann, Joachim (18 January 2001). "Seine Königliche Hoheit der Obergruppenführer" [His Royal Highness the [SA] Group Leader]. Zeit Online (in German).
- Padberg, Richard (14 May 2024). "Vorreiter in NS-Zeit: Coburg arbeitet Vergangenheit auf" [Pioneer in the Nazi era: Coburg comes to terms with the past] (in German). Bayerischer Rundfunk.
- Palmer, Charles (5 August 1916). "Traitors Near the Throne". John Bull – via British Newspaper Archive.
- Petropoulos, Jonathan (1 February 2018). "Hubertus Büschel. Hitlers adliger Diplomat: Der Herzog von Coburg und das Dritte Reich" [Hubertus Büschel. Hitler's Noble Diplomat: The Duke of Coburg and the Third Reich.]. The American Historical Review. 123 (1): 320–321. doi:10.1093/ahr/123.1.320. ISSN 0002-8762 – via Book Review Digest Plus (H. W. Wilson.
- Petropoulos, Jonathan (2006). Royals and the Reich. Oxford University Press.
- Priesner, Rudolf (1977). Herzog Carl Eduard zwischen Deutschland und England: eine tragische Auseinandersetzung [Duke Carl Eduard Between Germany and England: a Tragic Confrontation] (in German). Hohenloher Druck- und Verlagshaus. ISBN 9783873540637.
- Reynolds, K. D. (28 September 2006). "Leopold, Prince, First Duke of Albany". Oxford Dictionary of National Biography (online ed.). Oxford University Press. doi:10.1093/ref:odnb/16475. (Subscription, Wikipedia Library access or UK public library membership required.)
- Rudberg, Erik, ed. (1947). Svenska dagbladets årsbok 1946 [Svenska Dagsbladet Yearbook 1946] (in Swedish). Svenska Dagbladet. SELIBR 283647.
- Rushton, Alan R. (2018). Charles Edward of Saxe-Coburg: The German Red Cross and the Plan to Kill "Unfit" Citizens 1933–1945. Cambridge Scholars Publishing. ISBN 9781527513402.
- Sandner, Harald (2004). Das Haus von Sachsen-Coburg und Gotha 1826 bis 2001 [The House of Saxe-Coburg and Gotha 1826 to 2001] (in German). Andreas, Prinz von Sachsen-Coburg und Gotha (preface). Neue Presse GmbH. ISBN 9783000085253.
- Schmidt, Oliver (13 May 2024). "So konnten die Nazis an die Macht kommen" [This is how the Nazis were able to come to power]. Coburger Tageblatt.
- Stadler, Andreas (2019). Handbuch der Geschichte der Verwaltungsgerichtsbarkeit in Deutschland und Europa [Handbook of the History of Administrative Justice in Germany and Europe]. doi:10.1007/978-3-642-41235-6_14. ISBN 978-3-642-41235-6.
- Swift MacNeill, J. G. (11 April 1916). "A Slur on the House of Lords". The Times.
- Urbach, Karina (2017). Go-Betweens for Hitler (2nd ed.). Oxford University Press. ISBN 9780191008672.
- Velde, François. Heraldica.
- Victoria. "Queen Victoria's Journals".
- Weir, Alison (2008). Britain's Royal Families, The Complete Genealogy. Vintage Books. ISBN 9780099539735.
- Werenskiold, Erik (1924). Det norske kongehusets ordener og dekorasjoner. Oslo Universitetsforlag.
- Weir, Alison (18 April 2011). Britain's Royal Families: The Complete Genealogy. Random House. ISBN 9781446449110.
- Zeepvat, Charlotte (3 January 2008) [23 September 2004]. "Charles Edward, Prince, Second Duke of Albany". Oxford Dictionary of National Biography (online ed.). Oxford University Press. doi:10.1093/ref:odnb/41068. ISBN 9780198614128. (Subscription, Wikipedia Library access or UK public library membership required.)

Charles Edward, Duke of Saxe-Coburg and Gotha House of Saxe-Coburg and Gotha Cadet branch of the House of Wettin Born: 19 July 1884 Died: 6 March 1954
German nobility
Preceded by Alfred	Duke of Saxe-Coburg and Gotha; 30 July 1900 – 14 November 1918	Abolished
Peerage of the United Kingdom
Vacant Title last held by Prince Leopold	Duke of Albany (creation of 1881); 1884–1919	Deprived
Titles in pretence
Loss of titles	— TITULAR — Duke of Saxe-Coburg and Gotha; 14 November 1918 – 6 March 1954; Reason for succession failure: German Revolution of 1918–19	Succeeded by Prince Friedrich Josias
Loss of titles	— TITULAR — Duke of Albany; 28 March 1919 – 6 March 1954; Reason for succession failure: Titles Deprivation Act 1917	Succeeded by Prince Johann Leopold
