= Hitler's Favourite Royal =

- Genre: Television documentary
- Country of origin: United Kingdom
- Original language: English

Original release
- Network: Channel 4
- Release: 7 December 2007

Hitler's Favourite Royal was a British history documentary, about the life of Charles Edward, Duke of Saxe-Coburg and Gotha, released on Channel 4 on 7 December 2007. The Duke was British-born but relocated to Germany to become a German ruler at an early age and later became involved in Nazism. Some reviewers praised the documentary but others considered its portrayal of Charles Edward overly sympathetic.

== Summary ==
The documentary discusses the life of the Charles Edward, Duke of Saxe-Coburg and Gotha, who was born into the British Royal Family and spent his childhood in England. He was sent to Germany as a teenager in order to take up the dukedom. During the First World War, the duke took the side of Germany, lost his British titles, and was deposed from his position as duke when Germany became a republic. He later became an early supporter of Hitler and was convicted by a denazification court after the Second World War.

== Production and release ==
Fi Cotter Craig, the programme's producer, said in an interview with Broadcast that she had first heard of Charles Edward in around 2002. The duke was briefly discussed in a biography of Edward VIII and Cotter Craig's mother told her more about him. She was interested in his life and said that Channel 4 found the subject "irresistible". The production team aimed to avoid depicting him as a "two-dimensional stereotype" and emphasised the effect the First World War had on his national loyalties. The programme was produced by Monkey Factual and first shown on Channel 4 at 9pm on 7 December 2007.

== Reaction ==
Lucy Mangan, in a review for The Guardian, was complimentary of the programme, believing that it showed Charles Edward's complicity with Nazism. She concluded that it was "a solid documentary on a feeble man and a wretched family." A review in The Times described the documentary as telling a "twisty story". The Scotsman commented that the programme was a "fascinating account of a tragically misguided and understandably forgotten man". The newspaper argued that the documentary did not excuse Charles Edward's decisions but attempted to provide an explanation for them. The director of TVF International, a company that sells British television programmes in other countries, said in a 2009 interview with Televisual that the documentary had been popular abroad. She argued that this was a result of its compelling, "almost ... human interest" subject and high-quality production.

Gerald O'Donovan, writing in The Daily Telegraph, felt that the programme gave an overly sympathetic portrayal of its subject and speculated that Channel 4 may have been reluctant to "put the anti-monarchy boot in" due to a recent controversy related to the BBC's coverage of Elizabeth II. He felt that this may have been a reasonable way to depict the early part of Charles Edward's life, but that an inappropriate "victim mode" was maintained even after the deposed duke became a Nazi supporter. A review in The Independent made similar points and concluded that "All in all, the programme felt oddly lightweight, devoid of judgements or inferences ... [its producer] would have been better off presenting him as an example of the wider—unnervingly wide—phenomenon of British aristocrats who thought Adolf had the right idea about the Jews and dammit, it wasn't the Germans we should be fighting." Karena Urbach, a German historian, discussed Charles Edward in her 2015 book Go-Betweens For Hitler. She said the documentary's production team had access to limited evidence about his life with the result that:

its thesis became slightly muddled. This could perhaps be attributed to the producer’s wish to portray Carl Eduard as a victim of circumstances—a tragic figure in the wrong country at the wrong time. The director felt differently and resigned. Parts of the programme therefore drew a positive portrayal of a man lost in time, while in other parts Carl Eduard’s work is connected with the extermination of mentally ill children. Whether he was simply an Englishman lost abroad or a criminal remained unresolved.

== Bibliography ==
- Brittain, Nicola (30 November 2007). "Creative Review". Broadcast.
- Mangan, Lucy (7 December 2007). "Last Night's TV". The Guardian. Archived from the original on 6 October 2014.
- O'Donovan, Gerald (7 December 2007). "Last Night on Television: Hitler's Favourite Royal (Channel 4) – Spoil (Channel 4)". The Daily Telegraph.
- Teeman, Tim (7 December 2007). "Last Night's TV". The Times.
- Urbach, Karina (2017). Go-Betweens for Hitler (2nd ed.). Oxford University Press. ISBN 9780191008672.
- Whitelaw, Paul (December 2007). "His Royal Traitor". The Scotsman. p. 23.
