= Chocolate Soldier =

Chocolate Soldier is an expression referring to a good-looking but useless warrior, popularised by George Bernard Shaw's 1894 play Arms and the Man. The term originates as a derogatory label for a soldier who will not fight but looks good in a uniform, shortened from 'Chocolate Cream soldier'.

'Chocks' and 'chockos' are non-pejorative terms commonly used term to refer to members of the Australian Reserve Army.

It can refer to:

== Arts and entertainment ==
- The Chocolate Soldier, a 1908 operetta by Oscar Straus, based on the play Arms and the Man
- The Chocolate Soldier (film), a 1941 film version of the operetta, starring Nelson Eddy
- A member of the army of Chocolate Soldiers in The Wonder City of Oz (1940)

== Flora and fauna ==
- A common name of Kalanchoe tomentosa, a succulent plant
- A brown-flowered cultivar of Aquilegia viridiflora, the green columbine
- Two butterflies:
  - Junonia iphita
  - Junonia hedonia

== Other uses ==
- A chocolate liqueur-based cocktail – see List of cocktails
- Chocolate Soldier (drink), a chocolate-flavored soft drink
- A derogatory term for a member of the Australian Army Reserve
- Chocolate Soldier (Parliament), a Parliamentary assistant for an Opposition front-bench spokesman in the British House of Commons in the early 1970s, funded by the Joseph Rowntree Reform Trust
- The Chocolate Soldier, a missionary recruitment pamphlet written by Charles Studd in 1912

== See also ==
- Hot Chocolate Soldiers, a 1934 Walt Disney cartoon
