= List of consorts of Holstein-Sonderburg =

The Duchesses of Holstein-Sønderborg were the consorts of the rulers of Schleswig-Holstein-Sonderborg and it many branches. Only one branch, the House of Schleswig-Holstein-Sonderborg-Glücksburg, survive today but the current Glücksburg duchess hold the higher title of Duchess consort of Schleswig and Holstein

== Duchess consort of Schleswig-Holstein-Sonderburg, 1544–1668 ==
Picture	Name	Father	Birth	Marriage	Became Duchess	Ceased to be Duchess	Death	Spouse
	Elisabeth of Brunswick-Grubenhagen	Ernest III, Duke of Brunswick-Grubenhagen (Brunswick-Grubenhagen)	20 March 1550	19 August 1568		11 February 1586		John II
	Agnes Hedwig of Anhalt	Joachim Ernest, Prince of Anhalt (Ascania)	12 March 1573	14 February 1588		3 November 1616		John II
	Dorothea of Schwarzburg-Sondershausen	John Günther I, Count of Schwarzburg-Sondershausen (Schwarzburg-Sondershausen)	23 August 1579	26 November 1604	9 October 1622 husband's accession	13 May 1627 husband's death	25 July 1639	Alexander
	Anna of Oldenburg-Delmenhorst	Anton II, Count of Delmenhorst (Oldenburg-Delmenhorst)	28 March 1605	4 November 1634		28 June 1653 husband's death	12 December 1688	John Christian
	Eleonore Charlotte of Saxe-Lauenburg	Prince Franz Heinrich of Saxe-Lauenburg (Ascania)	8 August 1646	1 November 1676		1688; Sonderburg's confiscation	9 February 1709	Christian Adolf

=== Duchess consort Schleswig-Holstein-Sonderburg-Franzhagen, 1688–1708 ===
Picture	Name	Father	Birth	Marriage	Became Duchess	Ceased to be Duchess	Death	Spouse
	Anna of Oldenburg-Delmenhorst	Anton II, Count of Delmenhorst (Oldenburg-Delmenhorst)	28 March 1605	4 November 1634		28 June 1653 husband's death	12 December 1688	John Christian
	Eleonore Charlotte of Saxe-Lauenburg	Prince Franz Heinrich of Saxe-Lauenburg (Ascania)	8 August 1646	1 November 1676	1688; Franzhagen's creation	11 January 1702 husband's death	9 February 1709	Christian Adolf
	Anna Barbara Dorothea of Winterfeld	Barthold Dietrich von Winterfeld (Winterfeld)	4 September 1670	1705	13 July 1707 husband's accession	11 October 1708 husband's death	27 April 1739	Louis Charles

=== Duchess consort Schleswig-Holstein-Sonderburg-Augustenburg, 1647–1931 ===
Picture	Name	Father	Birth	Marriage	Became Duchess	Ceased to be Duchess	Death	Spouse
	Auguste of Schleswig-Holstein-Sonderburg-Glücksburg	Philipp, Duke of Schleswig-Holstein-Sonderburg-Glücksburg (Schleswig-Holstein-Sonderburg-Glücksburg)	27 June 1633	15 June 1651		18 January 1689 husband's death	26 May 1701	Ernest Günther
	Marie Therese of Velbrück	Konrad Gumprecht, Baron of Velbrück (Velbrück)	–	1695		1712		Ernest August
	Friederike Louise of Danneskiold-Samsøe	Christian Gyldenløve, Count of Samsø (Danneskiold-Samsøe)	2 October 1699	21 July 1720	11 May 1731 husband's accession	2 December 1744		Christian Augustus I
	Charlotte of Schleswig-Holstein-Sonderburg-Plön	Frederick Charles, Duke of Schleswig-Holstein-Sonderburg-Plön (Schleswig-Holstein-Sonderburg-Plön)	23 April 1744	26 May 1762		11 October 1770		Frederick Christian I
	Louise Auguste of Denmark	Christian VII of Denmark (Oldenburg)	7 July 1771	27 May 1786	13 November 1794 husband's accession	14 June 1814 husband's death	13 January 1843	Frederick Christian II
	Countess Louise Sophie of Danneskiold-Samsøe	Christian Conrad, Count of Danneskiold-Samsøe (Danneskiold-Samsøe)	22 September 1796	18 September 1820		11 March 1867		Christian Augustus II
	Adelheid of Hohenlohe-Langenburg	Ernst, Prince of Hohenlohe-Langenburg (Hohenlohe-Langenburg)	20 July 1835	11 September 1856	11 March 1869 husband's ascession	14 January 1880 husband's death	25 January 1900	Frederick VIII
	Dorothea of Saxe-Coburg and Gotha	Prince Philipp of Saxe-Coburg and Gotha (Saxe-Coburg and Gotha)	30 April 1881	2 August 1898		22 February 1921 husband's death	21 January 1967	Ernst Gunther
	Karoline Mathilde of Schleswig-Holstein-Sonderburg-Augustenburg	Frederick VIII, Duke of Schleswig-Holstein (Schleswig-Holstein-Sonderburg-Augustenburg)	25 January 1860	19 March 1885	27 April 1931 husband's accession	20 February 1932		Frederick Ferdinand
	Marie Melita of Hohenlohe-Langenburg	Ernst II, Prince of Hohenlohe-Langenburg (Hohenlohe-Langenburg)	18 January 1899	5 February 1916	21 January 1934 husband's accession	10 February 1965 husband's death	8 November 1967	William Frederick
	Marie Alix of Schaumburg-Lippe	Prince Stephan Alexander Viktor of Schaumburg-Lippe (Schaumburg-Lippe)	2 April 1923	9 October 1947	10 February 1965 husband's accession	30 September 1980 husband's death	–	Peter
	Elisabeth of Lippe-Weissenfeld	Alfred, Prince of Lippe-Weissenfeld (Lippe-Weissenfeld)	28 July 1957	23 September 1981		Incumbent	–	Christoph

==== Duchess consort Schleswig-Holstein-Sonderburg-Beck, 1647–1825 ====
Picture	Name	Father	Birth	Marriage	Became Duchess	Ceased to be Duchess	Death	Spouse
	Clara of Oldenburg	Anton II, Count of Delmenhorst (Oldenburg)	19 April 1606	15 January 1645	1627; Beck's creation	19 January 1647		August Philip
	Sidonie of Oldenburg	Anton II, Count of Delmenhorst (Oldenburg)	10 June 1611	June 1649		1650		August Philip
	Maria Sibylla of Nassau-Saarbrücken	William Louis, Count of Nassau-Saarbrücken (Nassau)	6 October 1628	12 April 1651		6 May 1675 husband's death	9 April 1699	August Philip
	Hedwig Louise of Lippe-Alverdissen	Philip I, Count of Schaumburg-Lippe (Lippe)	6 May 1650	1676		26 September 1689 husband's death	18 March 1731	August
	Maria Antonia Isnardi di Castello, Contessa di Sanfré	Francesco Antonio Isnardi di Castello, Conte di Sanfré (Isnardi)	1692	8 February 1708		16 June 1719 husband's death	17 February 1762	Frederick William I
	Louise Charlotte of Schleswig-Holstein-Sonderburg-Augustenburg	Ernest Günther, Duke of Schleswig-Holstein-Sonderburg-Augustenburg (Augustenburg)	23 April 1658	1 January 1685	16 June 1719 husband's accession	7 March 1728 husband's death	2 May 1740	Frederick Louis
	Ursula Anna of Dohna-Schlobitten	Christopher I, Burgrave and Count of Dohna-Schlodien (Dohna)	31 December 1700	5 November 1721	7 March 1728 husband's accession	11 November 1749 husband's death	17 March 1761	Frederick William II
	Countess Friederike of Schlieben	Count Karl Leopold von Schlieben (Schlieben)	28 February 1757	9 March 1780		25 March 1816 husband's death	17 December 1827	Frederick Karl Ludwig
	Princess Louise Caroline of Hesse-Kassel	Prince Charles of Hesse-Kassel (Hesse-Kassel)	28 September 1789	26 January 1810	25 March 1816 husband's accession	6 July 1825 husband became Duke of Glücksburg	13 March 1867	Frederick Wilhelm

===== Duchess consort of Schleswig-Holstein-Sonderburg-Glücksburg, 1825–present =====
Picture	Name	Father	Birth	Marriage	Became Duchess	Ceased to be Duchess	Death	Spouse
	Princess Louise Caroline of Hesse-Kassel	Prince Charles of Hesse-Kassel (Hesse-Kassel)	28 September 1789	26 January 1810	6 July 1825 husband became Duke of Glücksburg	17 February 1831 husband's death	13 March 1867	Frederick Wilhelm
	Princess Vilhelmine Marie of Denmark	Frederick VI of Denmark (Oldenburg)	18 January 1808	19 May 1838		24 October 1878 husband's death	30 May 1891	Karl
	Princess Adelheid of Schaumburg-Lippe	George William, Prince of Schaumburg-Lippe (Lippe)	9 March 1821	16 October 1841	24 October 1878 husband's accession	27 November 1885 husband's death	30 July 1899	Friedrich
	Karoline Mathilde of Schleswig-Holstein-Sonderburg-Augustenburg	Frederick VIII, Duke of Schleswig-Holstein (Schleswig-Holstein-Sonderburg-Augustenburg)	25 January 1860	19 March 1885	27 November 1885 husband's accession	20 February 1932		Frederick Ferdinand
	Marie Melita of Hohenlohe-Langenburg	Ernst II, Prince of Hohenlohe-Langenburg (Hohenlohe-Langenburg)	18 January 1899	5 February 1916	21 January 1934 husband's accession	10 February 1965 husband's death	8 November 1967	William Frederick
	Marie Alix of Schaumburg-Lippe	Prince Stephan Alexander Viktor of Schaumburg-Lippe (Schaumburg-Lippe)	2 April 1923	9 October 1947	10 February 1965 husband's accession	30 September 1980 husband's death	–	Peter
	Elisabeth of Lippe-Weissenfeld	Alfred, Prince of Lippe-Weissenfeld (Lippe-Weissenfeld)	28 July 1957	23 September 1981		27 September 2023 husband's death	–	Christoph

===== Duchess consort Schleswig-Holstein-Sonderburg-Wiesenburg, 1647–1744 =====
Picture	Name	Father	Birth	Marriage	Became Duchess	Ceased to be Duchess	Death	Spouse
	Katharina of Waldeck-Wildungen	Christian, Count of Waldeck-Wildungen (Waldeck-Wildungen)	20 October 1612	15 November 1643	1647; Wiesenburg's creation	24 November 1649		Philip Louis
	Anna Margaret of Hesse-Homburg	Frederick I, Landgrave of Hesse-Homburg (Hesse-Homburg)	31 August 1629	5 May 1650		3 August 1686		Philip Louis
	Magdalene Christine of Reuss-Obergreiz	Heinrich I, Count of Reuss-Obergreiz (Reuss-Obergreiz)	3 August 1652	28 July 1688		10 March 1689 husband's death	18 December 1697	Philip Louis
	Marie Elisabeth of Liechtenstein	Hans-Adam I, Prince of Liechtenstein (Liechtenstein)	3 May 1683	6 March 1713	7 October 1724 husband's accession	4 March 1744 husband's death	8 May 1744	Leopold

=== Duchess consort Schleswig-Holstein-Sonderburg-Norburg, 1622–1669 ===
Picture	Name	Father	Birth	Marriage	Became Duchess	Ceased to be Duchess	Death	Spouse
	Juliane of Saxe-Lauenburg	Francis II of Saxe-Lauenburg (Ascania)	26 December 1589	1 August 1627		1 December 1630		Frederick
	Eleonore of Anhalt-Zerbst	Rudolph, Prince of Anhalt-Zerbst (Ascania)	10 November 1608	15 February 1632		22 July 1658 husband's death	2 November 1680	Frederick
Staatsbankrott und Übergabe an Schleswig-Holstein-Sonderburg-Plön

=== Duchess consort Schleswig-Holstein-Sonderburg-Glücksburg, 1622–1779 ===
Picture	Name	Father	Birth	Marriage	Became Duchess	Ceased to be Duchess	Death	Spouse
	Sophie Hedwig of Saxe-Lauenburg	Francis II of Saxe-Lauenburg (Ascania)	24 May 1601	23 May 1624		1 February 1660		Philipp
	Sibylle Ursula of Brunswick-Wolfenbüttel	Augustus the Younger, Duke of Brunswick-Lüneburg (Welf)	4 February 1629	13 September 1663	27 September 1663 husband accession	12 December 1671		Christian
	Agnes Hedwig of Schleswig-Holstein-Sonderburg-Plön	Joachim Ernest, Duke of Schleswig-Holstein-Sonderburg-Plön (Schleswig-Holstein-Sonderburg-Plön)	29 September 1640	10 May 1672		17 November 1698 husband death	20 November 1698	Christian
	Christine of Saxe-Eisenberg	Christian, Duke of Saxe-Eisenberg (Wettin)	4 March 1679	15 February 1699		24 May 1722		Philipp Ernst
	Katharine Christine of Ahlefeldt	Detlev Siegfried von Ahlefeldt (Ahlefelft)	1687	1722		8 May 1726		Philipp Ernst
	Charlotte Marie of Schleswig-Holstein-Sonderburg-Augustenburg	Prince Frederick William of Schleswig-Holstein-Sonderburg-Augustenburg (Schleswig-Holstein-Sonderburg-Augustenburg)	5 September 1697	17 October 1726		12 November 1729 husband death	30 April 1760	Philipp Ernst
	Auguste of Lippe-Detmold	Simon Henry Adolph, Count of Lippe-Detmold (Lippe-Detmold)	26 March 1725	19 June 1745		10 November 1766 husband death	5 August 1777	Friedrich
	Anna Karoline of Nassau-Saarbrücken	William Henry, Prince of Nassau-Saarbrücken (Nassau-Weilburg)	31 December 1751	9 August 1769		13 March 1779 husband death	12 April 1824	Friedrich Heinrich Wilhelm

=== Duchess consort Schleswig-Holstein-Sonderburg-Plön, 1622–1766 ===
Picture	Name	Father	Birth	Marriage	Became Duchess	Ceased to be Duchess	Death	Spouse
	Dorothea Augusta of Schleswig-Holstein-Gottorp	John Adolf, Duke of Holstein-Gottorp (Schleswig-Holstein-Gottorp)	12 May 1602	12 May 1633		5 October 1671 husband's death	13 March 1682	Joachim Ernest
	Dorothea Sophia of Brunswick-Wolfenbüttel	Rudolph Augustus, Duke of Brunswick-Lüneburg (Welf)	17 January 1653	2 April 1673		2 July 1704 husband's death	21 March 1722	John Adolph
	Countess Palatine Magdalene Juliane of Gelnhausen	John Charles, Count Palatine of Gelnhausen (Wittelsbach)	28 February 1686	26 November 1704		5 November 1720		Joachim Frederick
	Juliane Luise of Ostfriesland	Christian Everhard, Prince of Ostfriesland (Cirksena)	13 June 1698	17 February 1721		28 May 1722 husband's death	6 February 1740	Joachim Frederick
	Countess Christiane Armgardis von Reventlow	Count Christian Detlev von Reventlow (Reventlow)	2 May 1711	18 July 1730		18 October 1761 husband's death	6 October 1779	Frederick Charles

==== Duchess consort Schleswig-Holstein-Sonderburg-Plön-Rethwisch, ?–1729 ====
Picture	Name	Father	Birth	Marriage	Became Duchess	Ceased to be Duchess	Death	Spouse
	Isabelle de Merode-Westerloo	Ferdinand Philip of Merode (Merode-Westerloo)	1649	21 January 1677	? Rethwisch's creation	17 September 1699 husband's death	7 January 1701	Joachim Ernest II
	Marie Cölestine de Merode	Claudius Francois of Merode (Merode)	3 February 1679	1703		1713 divorce	24 November 1725	John Ernest Ferdinand
Merged into Plön on 21 May 1729 after extinction

==== Duchess consort Schleswig-Holstein-Sonderburg-Norburg, 1679–1729 ====
Second Creation
Picture	Name	Father	Birth	Marriage	Became Duchess	Ceased to be Duchess	Death	Spouse
	Elisabeth Charlotte of Anhalt-Harzgerode	Frederick, Prince of Anhalt-Harzgerode (Ascania)	11 February 1647	6 October 1666	1679; Wiesenburg's recreation	17 September 1699 husband's death	2 January 1723	August
	Countess Palatine Magdalene Juliane of Gelnhausen	John Charles, Count Palatine of Gelnhausen (Wittelsbach)	28 February 1686	26 November 1704		5 November 1720		Joachim Frederick
	Juliane Luise of Ostfriesland	Christian Everhard, Prince of Ostfriesland (Cirksena)	13 June 1698	17 February 1721		28 May 1722 husband's death	6 February 1740	Joachim Frederick
Merged into Plön on 21 May 1729

== See also ==
- List of consorts of Schleswig and Holstein
- List of Russian consorts
- List of Danish consorts
- List of consorts of Oldenburg
- List of Norwegian queens
- List of Finnish consorts
- List of Swedish consorts
