= Peter, Duke of Schleswig-Holstein =

Duke of Schleswig-Holstein (1964–1980)

Peter
- Duke of Schleswig-Holstein
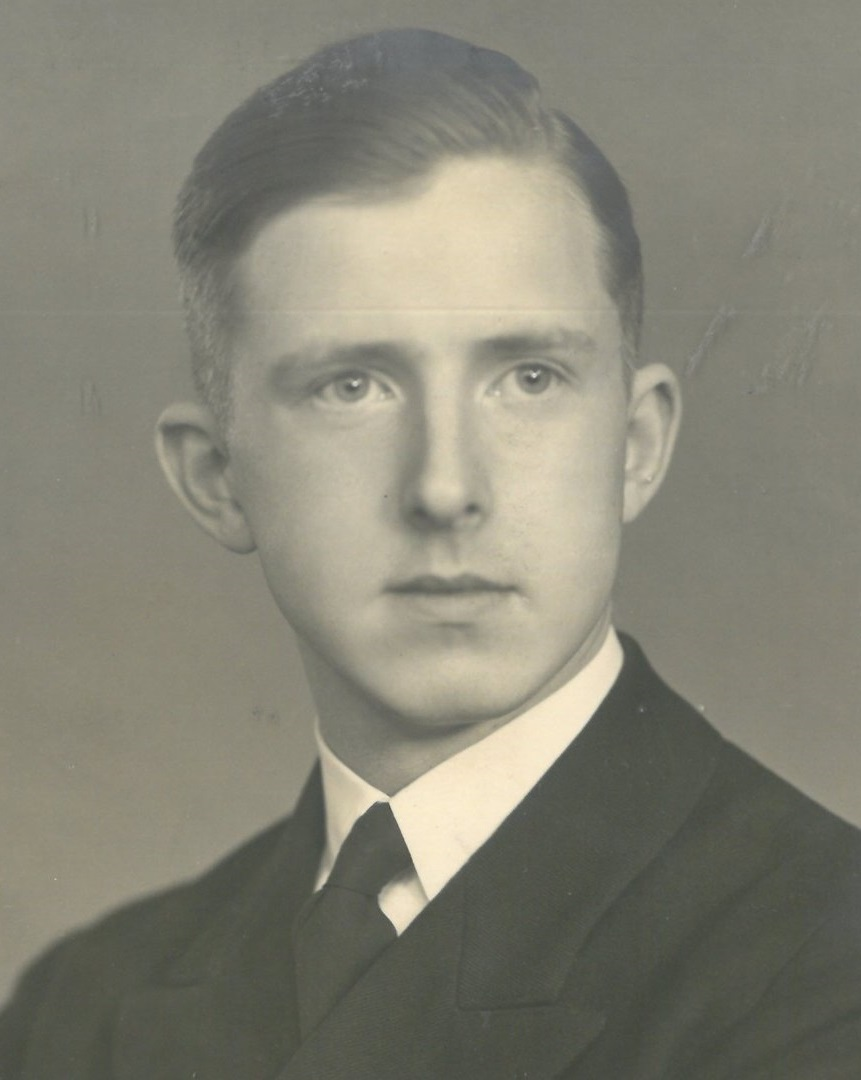
- Peter about 1942

Head of the House of Schleswig-Holstein
- Tenure: 10 February 1965 – 30 September 1980
- Predecessor: Wilhelm Friedrich
- Successor: Christoph
- Born: 30 April 1922; Schleswig-Holstein, Prussia, Germany
- Died: 30 September 1980 (aged 58); Thumby, Schleswig-Holstein, West Germany
- Spouse: Princess Marie Alix of Schaumburg-Lippe (m. 1947)
- Issue: Christoph, Prince of Schleswig-Holstein
Names
- Frederick Ernest Peter; German: Friedrich Ernst Peter
- House: Glücksburg
- Father: Wilhelm Friedrich, Duke of Schleswig-Holstein
- Mother: Princess Marie Melita of Hohenlohe-Langenburg

Peter, Duke of Schleswig-Holstein-Sonderburg-Glücksburg, from 1965 Duke of Schleswig-Holstein (German: Friedrich Ernst Peter; 30 April 1922 – 30 September 1980), was the seventh Duke of Schleswig-Holstein and Head of the House of Oldenburg from 1965 until his death.

== Life ==
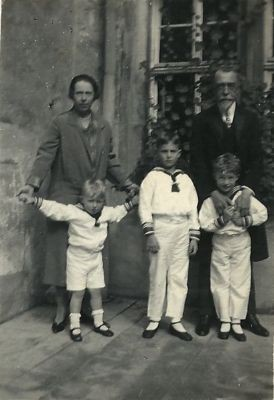
Prince Peter (right) with his two brothers and their grandparents Ernst II and Princess Alexandra af Hohenlohe-Langenburg.

Peter was born on 30 April 1922 in Louisenlund Palace, Schleswig-Holstein. He was the third son of Prince Friedrich of Glücksburg and his wife Princess Marie Melita of Hohenlohe-Langenburg. His father was the fifth child and only son of Friedrich Ferdinad, Duke of Schleswig-Holstein in his marriage to Princess Karoline Mathilde of Schleswig-Holstein-Sonderburg-Augustenburg. His mother was the daughter of Ernst II, Prince of Hohenlohe-Langenburg in his marriage to Princess Alexandra of Saxe-Coburg and Gotha, who was herself the granddaughter of Queen Victoria of the United Kingdom and Tsar Alexander II of Russia.

However, his grandfather lost his title when the monarchies were abolished in Germany in the November Revolution of 1918. Unofficially, however, the use of the ducal title continued even after 1918. In 1931, the grandfather also became head of the House of Oldenburg and pretender to the throne in Schleswig-Holstein, when the Augustenborg branch of the princely house became extinct that year.

Prince Hans Albrecht's grandfather, Duke Friederich Ferdinand died on 21 January 1934, after which his father became head of the family, while Peter's older brother Hans Albrecht became hereditary prince. Hereditary Prince Hans Albrecht fell during World War II on 10 August 1944. When the other older brother Prince William Alfred had died in 1926, Peter thus became heir to the title of Duke of Schleswig-Holstein-Sonderburg-Glücksborg with the title of hereditary prince.

Together with his wife, Peter took part in the ship tour organized by Queen Frederica and her husband King Paul of Greece in 1954, which became known as the “Cruise of the Kings” and was attended by over 100 royals from all over Europe.

Duke Frederik died at the age of 73 on 10 February 1965 in Coburg, Bavaria, after which Peter became head of the family.

Duke Peter died on 30 September 1980 at the Binebæk estate in Schleswig-Holstein. He was succeeded as head of the family by his eldest surviving son, Prince Christoph.

== Issue ==
On 9 October 1947, Peter married Princess Marie Alix of Schaumburg-Lippe, daughter of Prince Stephan of Schaumburg-Lippe and Princess Ingeborg Alix of Oldenburg. They had four children:

- Princess Marita of Schleswig-Holstein-Sonderborg-Glücksborg (born 1948), married Baron Wilfried von Plotho (born 1942) in 1975. They have two children:
  - Baron Christoph von Plotho (born 1976), married Anahita Varzi in 2010. They have two children:
    - Baron Antonius von Plotho (born 2013)
    - Baroness Celia von Plotho (born 2015)
  - Baroness Irina von Plotho (born 1978), married Julius von Bethmann-Hollweg (born 1977) in 2016. They have two children:
    - Nikolai von Bethmann-Hollweg (born 2017)
    - Emilia von Bethman-Hollweg
- Christoph, Prince of Schleswig-Holstein (1949–2023), titular Duke between 1980 and 2023.
- Prince Alexander of Schleswig-Holstein-Sonderborg-Glücksborg (born 9 July 1953), married Barbara Fertsch (27 July 1961–28 April 2009) in 1994. They had two children:
  - Princess Elena of Schleswig-Holstein-Sonderborg-Glücksborg (born 1995)
  - Prince Julian of Schleswig-Holstein-Sonderborg-Glücksborg (born 1997)
- Princess Ingeborg of Schleswig-Holstein-Sonderborg-Glücksborg (born 9 July 1956), married German businessman Nikolaus Broschek (born 1942) in 1991. They have one son:
  - Alexis Broschek (born 1995)

== Ancestry ==
Ancestors of Peter, Duke of Schleswig-Holstein

Friedrich, Duke of Schleswig-Holstein-Sonderburg-Glücksburg
Friedrich Ferdinand, Duke of Schleswig-Holstein
Princess Adelheid of Schaumburg-Lippe
Wilhelm Friedrich, Duke of Schleswig-Holstein
Frederick VIII, Duke of Schleswig-Holstein
Princess Karoline Mathilde of Schleswig-Holstein-Sonderburg-Augustenburg
Princess Adelheid of Hohenlohe-Langenburg
Peter, Duke of Schleswig-Holstein
Hermann, Prince of Hohenlohe-Langenburg
Ernst II, Prince of Hohenlohe-Langenburg
Princess Leopoldine of Baden
Princess Marie Melita of Hohenlohe-Langenburg
Alfred, Duke of Saxe-Coburg and Gotha
Princess Alexandra of Saxe-Coburg and Gotha
Grand Duchess Maria Alexandrovna of Russia

== Bibliography ==
- Huberty, Michel; Giraud, Alain; Magdelaine, F.; Magdelaine, B. (1994). L'Allemagne dynastique (in French). Vol. Oldenbourg (VII ed.). Le Perreux-sur-Marne: A. Giraud. p. 767. ISBN 978-2-90113-807-5..
- Huberty, Michel; Giraud, Alain; Magdelaine, F.; Magdelaine, B. (1976). L'Allemagne dynastique (in French). Vol. Hesse-Reuss-Saxe (I ed.). Le Perreux-sur-Marne: A. Giraud. p. 587. ISBN 978-2-90113-801-3..
- Jean-Fred Tourtchine (1989). Les manuscrits du CEDRE: Le Royaume-Uni de Grande-Bretagne et d'Irlande du Nord (in French). Vol. 2. Paris: CEDRE. p. 198. ISSN 0993-3964..
