= Hans Albrecht, Hereditary Prince of Schleswig-Holstein =

Hans Albrecht
- Hereditary Prince of Schleswig-Holstein
- Born: 12 May 1917; Schloss Louisenlund, Güby, near Eckernförde, Schleswig, Schleswig-Holstein, Germany
- Died: 10 August 1944 (aged 27); Jedlińsk, General Government, Germany
Names
- John Albert Victor Alexander Frederick Ernest Godfrey Augustus Henry Valdemar; German: Hans Albrecht Viktor Alexander Friedrich Ernst Gottfried August Heinrich Waldemar
- House: Glücksburg
- Father: Wilhelm Friedrich, Duke of Schleswig-Holstein
- Mother: Princess Marie Melita of Hohenlohe-Langenburg

Hans Albrecht was titled Hereditary Prince of Schleswig-Holstein-Sonderburg-Glücksburg, and from 1931 onwards of Schleswig-Holstein. He was the Hereditary Prince of Schleswig-Holstein and the heir apparent to the Head of the House of Oldenburg.

He was the eldest son of Wilhelm Friedrich, Duke of Schleswig-Holstein, and Princess Marie Melita of Hohenlohe-Langenburg. He fought in the Second World War between 1939 and 1944 when he died from wounds received in action near Jedlińsk, Poland.

== Ancestry ==
Ancestors of Hans Albrecht, Hereditary Prince of Schleswig-Holstein

8. Friedrich, Duke of Schleswig-Holstein-Sonderburg-Glücksburg
4. Friedrich Ferdinand, Duke of Schleswig-Holstein
9. Princess Adelheid of Schaumburg-Lippe
2. Wilhelm Friedrich, Duke of Schleswig-Holstein
10. Frederick VIII, Duke of Schleswig-Holstein
5. Princess Karoline Mathilde of Schleswig-Holstein-Sonderburg-Augustenburg
11. Princess Adelheid of Hohenlohe-Langenburg
1. Hans Albrecht, Hereditary Prince of Schleswig-Holstein
12. Hermann, Prince of Hohenlohe-Langenburg
6. Ernst II, Prince of Hohenlohe-Langenburg
13. Princess Leopoldine of Baden
3. Princess Marie Melita of Hohenlohe-Langenburg
14. Alfred, Duke of Saxe-Coburg and Gotha
7. Princess Alexandra of Edinburgh
15. Grand Duchess Maria Alexandrovna of Russia
