= Christoph of Schleswig-Holstein =

Christoph
- Prince of Schleswig-Holstein
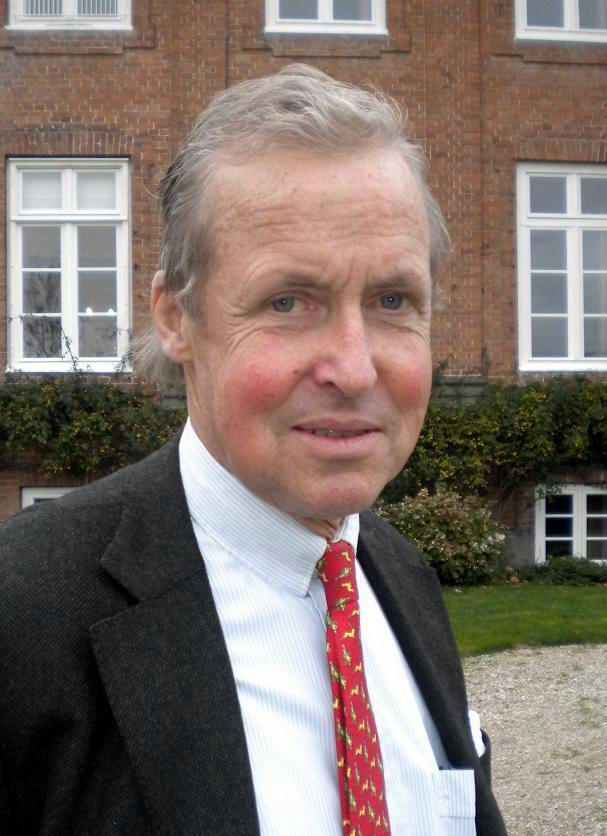
- Christoph in 2010

Head of the House of Schleswig-Holstein
- Tenure: 30 September 1980 – 27 September 2023
- Predecessor: Peter, Duke of Schleswig-Holstein
- Successor: Friedrich Ferdinand Prinz zu Schleswig-Holstein
- Born: 22 August 1949; Schloss Louisenlund, Güby, near Eckernförde, Schleswig-Holstein, West Germany
- Died: 27 September 2023 (aged 74)
- Spouse: Princess Elisabeth of Lippe-Weissenfeld (m. 1981)
- Issue: Princess Sophie; Prince Friedrich Ferdinand; Prince Constantin; Prince Leopold
- House: Oldenburg
- Father: Peter, Duke of Schleswig-Holstein
- Mother: Princess Marie Alix of Schaumburg-Lippe

Christoph of Schleswig-Holstein (22 August 1949 – 27 September 2023) (German: Christoph Prinz zu Schleswig-Holstein) was the head of the House of Schleswig-Holstein-Sonderburg-Glücksburg (commonly known as the House of Glücksburg) and, by agnatic primogeniture, of the entire House of Oldenburg between 1980 and 2023. Traditionally he would have been the eighth Duke of Schleswig-Holstein and Duke of Glücksburg, styled as His Highness. He was a male-line descendant of Christian I of Denmark, and was also descended cognatically from numerous more recent monarchs, including Queen Victoria of the United Kingdom, Emperor Alexander II of Russia and several more recent Danish kings. His paternal grandmother was Princess Marie Melita of Hohenlohe-Langenburg, a great-granddaughter of Queen Victoria.

== House of Schleswig-Holstein-Sonderburg-Glücksburg ==
The House of Oldenburg — in one of its cadet branches — is patrilineally the royal house of Norway (1450–1818 and since 1905) and the United Kingdom (since 2022), and has been the reigning dynasty of several other countries including Denmark, Greece, Sweden and Russia. As such, Christoph was the agnatic head of the family that today includes Haakon VIII of Norway and, patrilineally, Charles III of the United Kingdom. His great-great-grandfather, Friedrich, Duke of Schleswig-Holstein-Sonderburg-Glücksburg, was the older brother of Christian IX of Denmark, and through him Christoph is heir by male primogeniture to the Danish title Duke of [Schleswig-Holstein-Sonderburg-]Glücksburg (heir of the last extant ducal branch of the House of Schleswig-Holstein-Sonderburg) conferred by the Danish crown in 1825. Christoph was also, cognatically, a descendant of Queen Victoria and Alexander II of Russia.

== Life and activities ==
Christoph was born in Louisenlund Castle in Güby, near Eckernförde, Schleswig-Holstein, West Germany, the eldest son of Peter, Duke of Schleswig-Holstein (1922–1980), and his wife, Princess Marie Alix of Schaumburg-Lippe (1923-2021). He had a diploma in Agricultural Engineering. Christoph served as a Reservist in the German Army for two years, holding the rank of lieutenant.

Christoph succeeded to the headship of the ducal house on 30 September 1980 following the death of his father. While possession of the united duchies of Schleswig and Holstein had been allocated by a series of wars and treaties since the First Schleswig War of 1848 and the London Protocol of 1852, the ducal title was borne by Christoph's father and paternal grandfather (as inherited from his great-grandfather, Friedrich Ferdinand, Duke of Schleswig-Holstein-Sonderburg-Glücksburg in 1934). However, Christoph was known also by the title which is shared by male cadets of the dynasty, "Prinz zu (Prince of) Schleswig-Holstein-Sonderburg-Glücksburg".

From 1980 onward, Christoph chaired the board of the family foundation that owns the ancestral castle, Glücksburg Castle. He was a founding member of the GLC Glücksburg Consulting Group and served as chairman of its advisory board. He resided in Grünholz near Schwansen, where he had business interests in agriculture, forestry and real estate. He was the owner of the Grünholz and Bienebek estates and was one of the largest landowners of Schleswig-Holstein. His sister, Princess Ingeborg, chairs the board of a further family foundation, the Stiftung Louisenlund.

== Marriage and issue ==
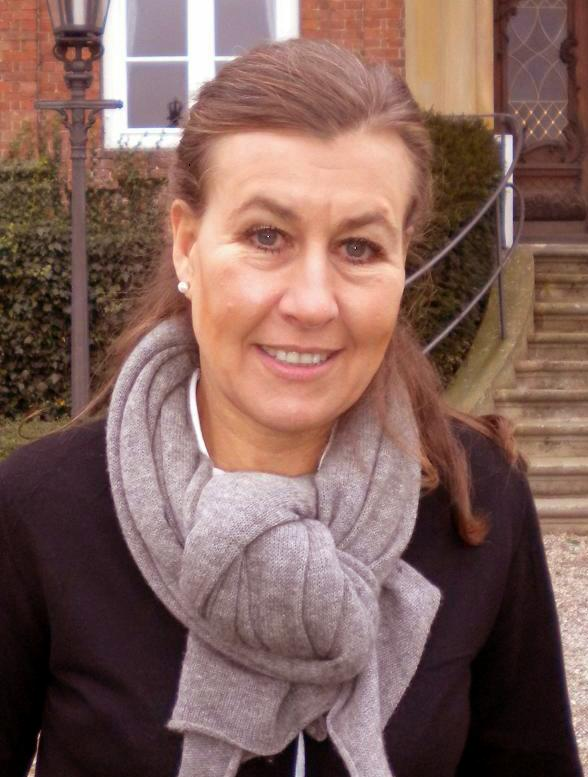
Christoph's wife: Princess Elisabeth of Schleswig-Holstein-Sonderburg-Glücksburg, Duchess of Schleswig-Holstein, Duchess of Glücksburg née Princess of Lippe-Weissenfeld (b. 1957).

Christoph married Princess Elisabeth of Lippe-Weissenfeld (b. 28 July 1957 in Munich), the youngest child of Prince Alfred Karl Friedrich Georg Franz of Lippe-Weissenfeld (1922-2024), who served as UNHCR representative for Italy, and his wife, Baroness Irmgard Julinka Wagner von Wehrborn (b. 1928). The couple married at Glücksburg civilly on 23 September 1981 and religiously on 3 October.

They had four children:

- Sophie (born 9 October 1983 in Eckernförde), who married Swedish entrepreneur Anders Wahlquist (born 1968) in 2015. They have two children꞉
  - Cecil Wahlquist (born 2016)
  - Sirai Wahlquist (born 2018)
- Friedrich Ferdinand (born 19 July 1985 in Eckernförde), 9th Duke of Schleswig-Holstein and Head of the House of Oldenburg, who married fashion model Anjuta Buchholz (born 19 July 1986) in March 2017. They have twin sons꞉
  - Hereditary Prince Alfred of Schleswig-Holstein (b. 15 June 2018)
  - Prince Albert of Schleswig-Holstein (b. 15 June 2018)
- Constantin (born 14 July 1986 in Eckernförde), who married civilly in March 2023 Countess Sophia von der Schulenburg (born 17 April 1990 in Valencia, Spain). They married religiously on 1 June 2024 in Sóller, Mallorca, and they have one son꞉
  - Prince Tassilo of Schleswig-Holstein (born July 2023)
- Leopold (born 5 September 1991 in Eckernförde), who married in 2025 Alix Preuss-Neudorf, daughter of Christian Preuss-Neudorf and Countess Margareta von der Schulenburg, and first cousin of her sister-in-law Princess Sophia (née von der Schulenburg).

== Death ==
Christoph died on 27 September 2023, at the age of 74, after a long-term illness. He was succeeded as head of the House of Oldenburg by his eldest son, Friedrich Ferdinand.

== Gallery ==
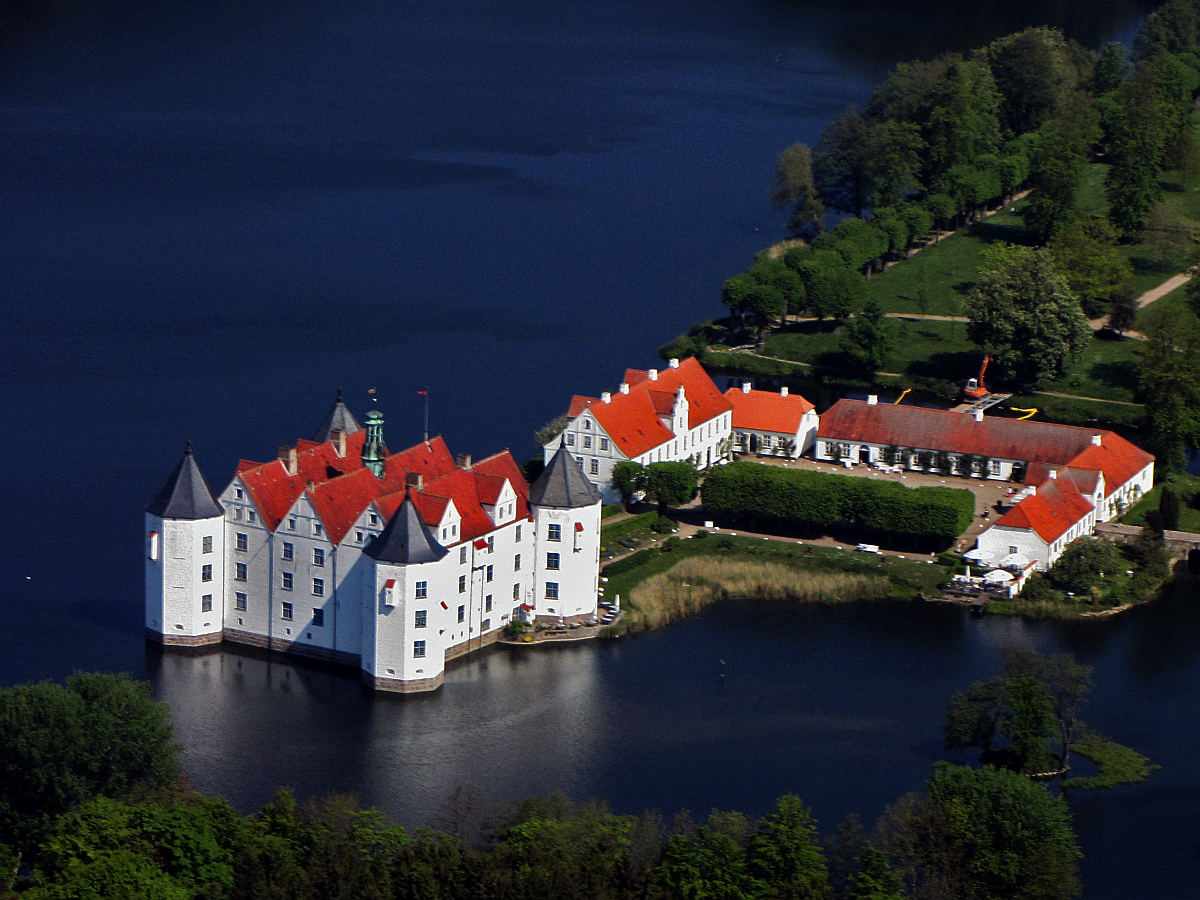
Glücksburg Castle

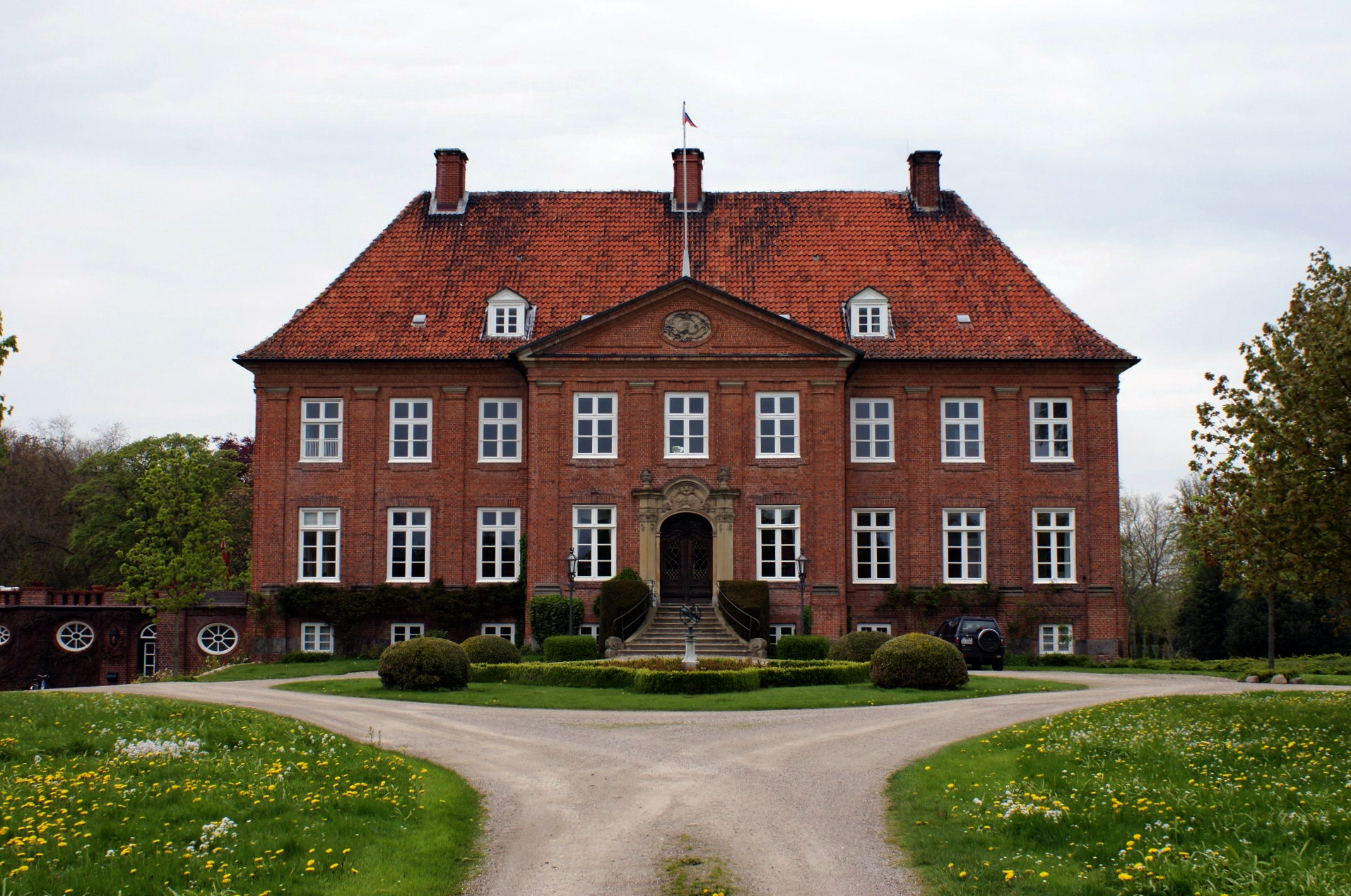
Grünholz Estate

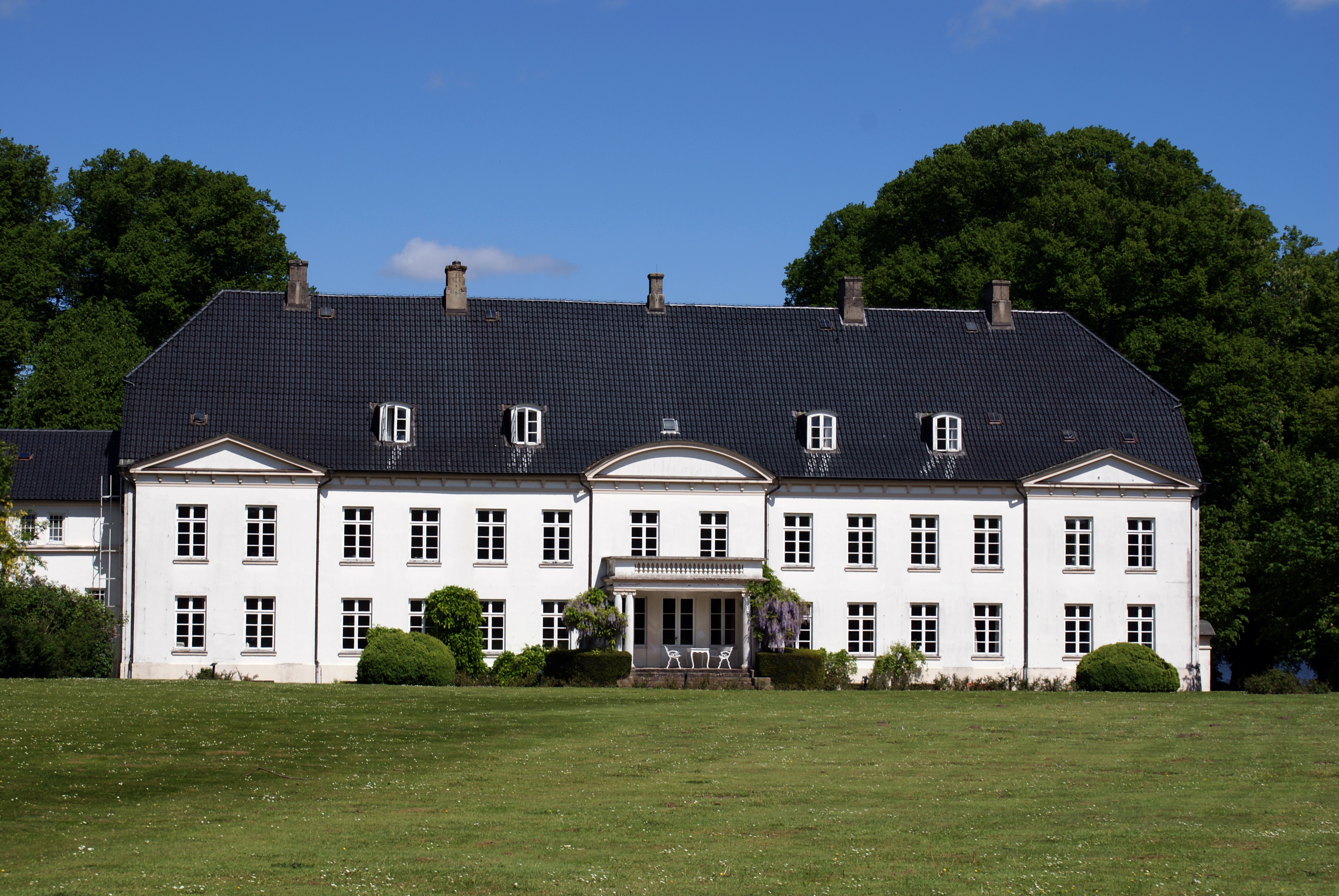
Louisenlund Palace

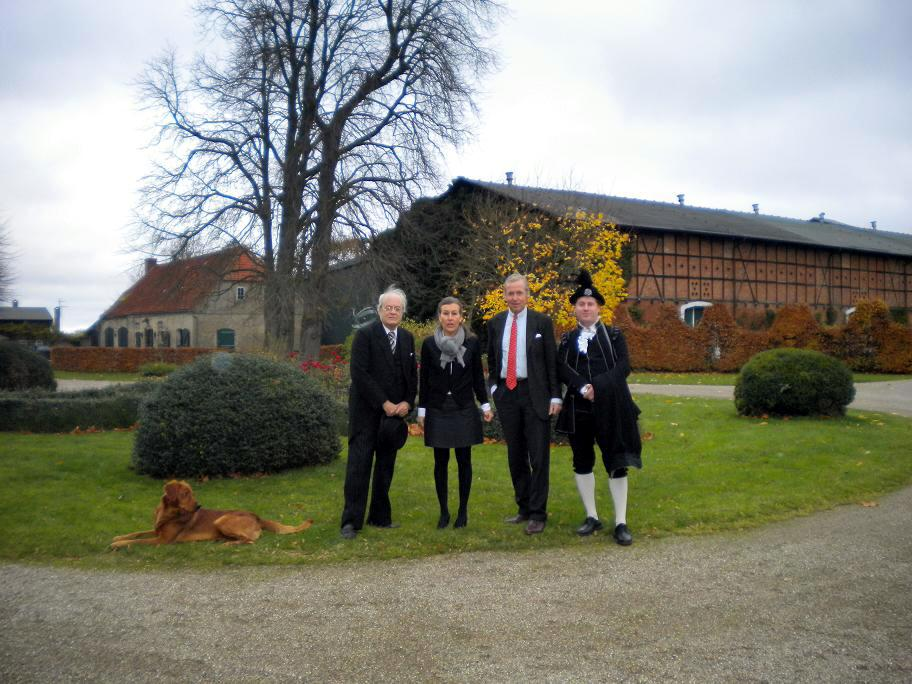
With his wife and Swedish visitors at Grünholz in 2010

== Ancestry ==
Ancestors of Christoph of Schleswig-Holstein

8. Friedrich Ferdinand, Duke of Schleswig-Holstein
4. Wilhelm Friedrich, Duke of Schleswig-Holstein
9. Princess Karoline Mathilde of Schleswig-Holstein-Sonderburg-Augustenburg
2. Peter, Duke of Schleswig-Holstein
10. Ernst II, Prince of Hohenlohe-Langenburg
5. Princess Marie Melita of Hohenlohe-Langenburg
11. Princess Alexandra of Saxe-Coburg and Gotha
1. Christoph, Prince of Schleswig-Holstein
12. George, Prince of Schaumburg-Lippe
6. Prince Stephan of Schaumburg-Lippe
13. Princess Marie Anne of Saxe-Altenburg
3. Princess Marie Alix of Schaumburg-Lippe
14. Frederick Augustus II, Grand Duke of Oldenburg
7. Duchess Ingeborg Alix of Oldenburg
15. Duchess Elisabeth Alexandrine of Mecklenburg-Schwerin

Christoph of Schleswig-Holstein House of Schleswig-Holstein-Sonderburg-Glücksburg Cadet branch of the House of Oldenburg Born: 22 August 1949 Died: 27 September 2023
German royalty
| Preceded by Peter | — TITULAR — Duke of Schleswig-Holstein; 30 September 1980 - 27 September 2023; Reason for succession failure: Duchy annexed by Prussia in 1866 | Succeeded by Friedrich Ferdinand |
