= Prince Hans =

Prince Hans may refer to:

- Prince Hans of Denmark (1518–1532)
- Hans-Adam I, Prince of Liechtenstein (1657–1712)
- Hans Albrecht, Hereditary Prince of Schleswig-Holstein (1917–1944)
- Hans-Adam II, Prince of Liechtenstein (born 1945)
- Prince Hans of the Southern Isles, a fictional character in Frozen
