= Ernst, Prince of Hohenlohe-Langenburg =

Ernst, Prince of Hohenlohe-Langenburg may refer to:

- Ernst I, Prince of Hohenlohe-Langenburg (1794-1860)
- Ernst II, Prince of Hohenlohe-Langenburg (1863-1950), grandson of Ernst I
