= Wilhelm Friedrich, Duke of Schleswig-Holstein =

Wilhelm Friedrich
- Duke of Schleswig-Holstein
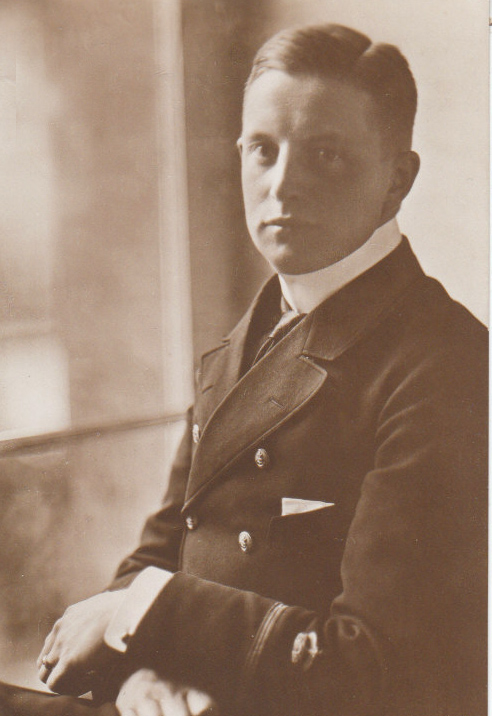
- Wilhelm Friedrich in 1915

Head of the House of Schleswig-Holstein
- Tenure: 21 January 1934 – 10 February 1965
- Predecessor: Friedrich Ferdinand
- Successor: Peter
- Born: 23 August 1891; Schleswig-Holstein, Prussia, German Empire
- Died: 10 February 1965 (aged 73); Coburg, Bavaria, West Germany
- Spouse: Princess Marie Melita of Hohenlohe-Langenburg (m. 1916)
- Issue: Hans Albrecht, Hereditary Prince of Schleswig-Holstein; Prince Wilhelm Alfred; Peter, Duke of Schleswig-Holstein; Princess Marie Alexandra
Names
- William Frederick Christian Gunther Albert Adolf George; German: Wilhelm Friedrich Christian Günther Albert Adolf Georg
- House: Glücksburg
- Father: Friedrich Ferdinand, Duke of Schleswig-Holstein
- Mother: Princess Karoline Mathilde of Schleswig-Holstein-Sonderburg-Augustenburg

Wilhelm Friedrich, Duke of Schleswig-Holstein-Sonderburg-Glücksburg, from 1934 Duke of Schleswig-Holstein (in German: Wilhelm Friedrich Christian Günther Albert Adolf Georg Prinz zu Schleswig-Holstein-Sonderburg-Glücksburg then Prinz zu Schleswig-Holstein; 23 August 1891 – 10 February 1965), was the sixth Duke of Schleswig-Holstein and Head of the House of Oldenburg from 21 January 1934 until his death on 10 February 1965.

== Early life ==
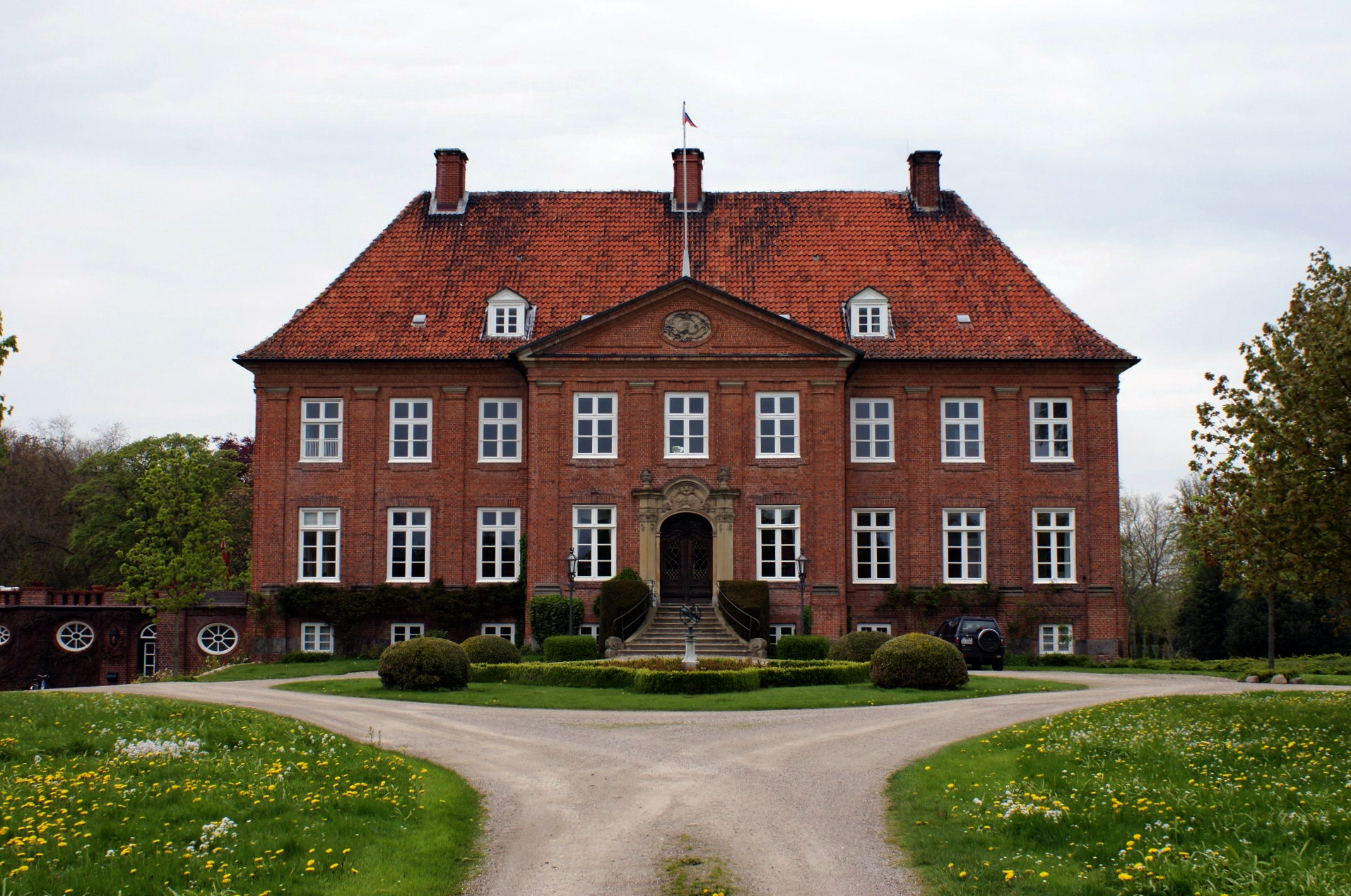
Friedrich's birthplace, Grünholz House, photographed in 2010.

Prince Friedrich was born on 23 August 1891 at Grünholz Castle in Schleswig-Holstein, Kingdom of Prussia. He was the fifth child and only son of Frederick Ferdinand, Duke of Schleswig-Holstein-Sonderbug-Glücksburg and Princess Karoline Mathilde of Schleswig-Holstein-Sonderburg-Augustenburg.

Prince Friedrich's father was the eldest son of Friedrich, Duke of Schleswig-Holstein-Sonderburg-Glücksburg and a nephew of Christian IX of Denmark. Upon the death of his father in 1885, he had succeeded to the headship of the House of Schleswig-Holstein-Sonderburg-Glücksburg and the title of duke.

== Marriage ==
Friedrich married Princess Marie Melita of Hohenlohe-Langenburg, daughter of Ernst II, Prince of Hohenlohe-Langenburg and Princess Alexandra of Saxe-Coburg and Gotha, on 15 February 1916. Both Friedrich and Marie Melita were great-grandchildren of Princess Feodora of Leiningen, making them second cousins.

== Later life ==
When the Head of the House of Schleswig-Holstein-Sonderburg-Augustenburg, Albert, Duke of Schleswig-Holstein, died on 27 April 1931, Friedrich's father Friedrich Ferdinand became the Head of the House of Oldenburg and inherited the title of Duke of Schleswig-Holstein.

On 21 January 1934, Duke Friedrich Ferdinand died, and Friedrich became head of the House of Schleswig-Holstein-Sonderburg-Glücksburg.

Duke Friedrich and his wife both joined the Nazi Party on 1 May 1937.

He died on 10 February 1965 in Coburg, Bavaria, West Germany.

== Issue ==
Duke Wilhelm Friedrich and Duchess Marie Melita had four children:

- Hans Albrecht, Hereditary Prince of Schleswig-Holstein (12 May 1917 – 10 August 1944)
- Prince Wilhelm Alfred Ferdinand of Schleswig-Holstein-Sonderburg-Glücksburg (24 September 1919 – 17 June 1926)
- Friedrich Ernst Peter, seventh Duke of Schleswig-Holstein (30 April 1922 – 30 September 1980), married with Princess Marie Alix of Schaumburg-Lippe, and father of the late head of the House of Schleswig-Holstein, Christoph, Prince of Schleswig-Holstein
- Princess Marie Alexandra of Schleswig-Holstein-Sonderburg-Glücksburg (9 July 1927 – 14 December 2000), married on 27 July 1970 Douglas Barton-Miller (born 8 December 1929)

== Ancestry ==
Ancestors of Wilhelm Friedrich, Duke of Schleswig-Holstein

8. Friedrich Wilhelm, Duke of Schleswig-Holstein-Sonderburg-Glücksburg
4. Friedrich, Duke of Schleswig-Holstein-Sonderburg-Glücksburg
9. Princess Louise Caroline of Hesse-Kassel
2. Friedrich Ferdinand, Duke of Schleswig-Holstein
10. George William, Prince of Schaumburg-Lippe
5. Princess Adelheid of Schaumburg-Lippe
11. Princess Ida of Waldeck and Pyrmont
1. Wilhelm Friedrich, Duke of Schleswig-Holstein
12. Christian August II, Duke of Schleswig-Holstein-Sonderburg-Augustenburg
6. Frederick VIII, Duke of Schleswig-Holstein
13. Countess Louise Sophie Danneskiold-Samsøe
3. Princess Karoline Mathilde of Schleswig-Holstein-Sonderburg-Augustenburg
14. Ernst I, Prince of Hohenlohe-Langenburg
7. Princess Adelheid of Hohenlohe-Langenburg
15. Princess Feodora of Leiningen

Wilhelm Friedrich, Duke of Schleswig-Holstein House of Schleswig-Holstein-Sonderburg-Glücksburg Cadet branch of the House of Oldenburg Born: 23 August 1891 Died: 10 February 1965
Titles in pretence
| Preceded by Friedrich Ferdinand | — TITULAR — Duke of Schleswig-Holstein; 1934–1965; Reason for succession failure: abolition of "Standesherren" in 1918 | Succeeded by Peter |
