= List of rulers of Schleswig-Holstein =

The following is a list of rulers (usually dukes) who ruled both Schleswig and Holstein, starting from the first Holstein count who received Schleswig, until both territories were annexed by the Kingdom of Prussia in 1866; and afterwards, titular dukes.

== The Houses of Schauenburg and Estridsen ==
In the course of history, the County of Holstein was several times partitioned among the inheriting sons into up to six lines. In 1386 King Oluf II of Denmark and his mother-regent, Queen Margaret I, enfeoffed in Nyborg Gerhard VI, Count of Holstein-Rendsborg and his cognatic successors with the Duchy of Schleswig, which had been in the royal family's hands until 1375. He was as Gerhard II duke of Schleswig. Until 1390 the Rendsborg branch united by inheritance all branches except of that of Holstein-Pinneberg. It remaining a separately ruled territory in Holstein until its line was extinct in 1640, when Holstein-Pinneberg was merged into the then Duchy of Holstein. Furthermore, the here mentioned rulers of course only reigned Holstein and Schleswig in their respective territorial composition of the time, thus without states and territories only merged later in what became today's State of Schleswig-Holstein, such as Ditmarsh, conquered and annexed in 1559, Saxe-Lauenburg merged in 1876, Heligoland (British rule 1807–1891), Free and Hanseatic City of Lübeck, Region of Lübeck, together with some Hamburgian exclaves in 1937. In turn much of the current westerly, northerly and easterly suburbs within Greater Hamburg were ceded from Holstein on 1 April 1937 (Cf. Greater Hamburg Act). North Schleswig had merged into Denmark in 1920. Some Lauenburgian and Mecklenburgian municipalities were exchanged by the Barber Lyashchenko Agreement in 1945.

== The House of Oldenburg ==
In 1460, Schleswig fell to the Danish royal House of Oldenburg, in the person of Christian I, who inherited not only the Duchy, a Danish fief, but also the County of Holstein-Rendsburg, a Saxe-Lauenburgian subfief within the Holy Roman Empire, following the death of his maternal uncle Adolf I (and VIII as Count of Holstein-Rendsburg). In 1474, Lauenburg's liege lord Emperor Frederick III elevated Christian as Count of Holstein-Rendsburg to Duke of Holstein, thus becoming an immediate imperial vassal (see imperial immediacy). The smaller Holstein-Pinneberg remained a county further ruled by the House of Schauenburg. In 1544, after Christian III's brothers reached majority, they partitioned the Duchies of Holstein (a fief of the Holy Roman Empire) and of Schleswig (a Danish fief) in an unusual way, following negotiations between the brothers and the Estates of the Realm of the duchies, which opposed a factual partition. They determined their youngest brother Frederick for a career as Lutheran administrator of an ecclesiastical state within the Holy Roman Empire.

So the revenues of the duchies were divided in three equal shares by assigning the revenues of particular areas and landed estates to each of the elder brothers, while other general revenues, such as taxes from towns and customs dues, were levied together but then shared among the brothers. The estates, whose revenues were assigned to the parties, made Holstein and Schleswig look like patchwork rags, technically inhibiting the emergence of separate new duchies, as intended by the estates of the duchies. The secular rule in the fiscally divided duchies thus became a condominium of the parties. As dukes of Holstein and Schleswig, the rulers of both houses bore the formal title of "Duke of Schleswig, Holstein, Dithmarschen and Stormarn".

The dynastic name Holstein-Gottorp comes as convenient usage from the technically more correct Duke of Schleswig and Holstein at Gottorp. Adolf, the third son of Duke and King Frederick I and the second youngest half-brother of King Christian III, founded the dynastic branch called House of Holstein-Gottorp, which is a cadet branch of the then royal Danish House of Oldenburg. The Danish monarchs and the Dukes of Holstein-Gottorp listed below ruled both duchies together as to general government, however, collected their revenues in their separate estates. John II the Elder conveniently called Duke of Schleswig-Holstein-Haderslev produced no issue, so no branch emerged from his side.

Similar to the above-mentioned agreement Christian III's youngest son John the Younger gained for him and his heirs a share in Holstein's and Schleswig's revenues in 1564, comprising a third of the royal share, thus a ninth of Holstein and Schleswig as to the fiscal point of view. John the Younger and his heirs, however, had no share in the condominial rule, they were only titular partitioned-off dukes.

The share of John II the Elder, who died in 1580, was halved between Adolf and Frederick II, thus increasing again the royal share by a fiscal sixth of Holstein and Schleswig. As an effect the complicated fiscal division of both separate duchies, Holstein and Schleswig, with shares of each party scattered in both duchies, provided them with a condominial government binding both together, partially superseding their legally different affiliation as Holy Roman and Danish fiefs.

Ruler	Born	Reign	Death	Part	Consort	Notes
Christian I (Christian 1.)	February 1426	1460-1481	21 May 1481	Schleswig	Dorothea of Brandenburg; 28 October 1449; Copenhagen five children	First ruler of Schleswig, which was inherited from Holstein-Rendsburg. Also King of Denmark and of the Kalmar Union.
John I (Hans)	2 February 1455	1481-1513	20 February 1513	Schleswig	Christina of Saxony; 6 September 1478; Copenhagen five children	Ruled jointly in Schleswig, John and Frederick, brothers, ruled together, and after the death of John, Frederick, kept the co-rulership with his nephew, Christian II. In 1523 the latter was deposed in both Denmark and Schleswig. They were also in succession Kings of Denmark: John 1481–1513, Christian 1513–23, Frederick 1523–33. John and Christian were also Kings of the Kalmar Union.
Frederick I (Frederik 1.)	7 October 1471	1490-1533	20 February 1533	Schleswig	Anna of Brandenburg; 10 April 1502; Stendal two children Sophie of Pomerania; 9 October 1518; Kiel six children	Ruled jointly in Schleswig, John and Frederick, brothers, ruled together, and after the death of John, Frederick, kept the co-rulership with his nephew, Christian II. In 1523 the latter was deposed in both Denmark and Schleswig. They were also in succession Kings of Denmark: John 1481–1513, Christian 1513–23, Frederick 1523–33. John and Christian were also Kings of the Kalmar Union.
Christian II the Tyrant (Christian 2.)	February 1426	1513-1523	21 May 1481	Schleswig	Isabella of Austria; 12 August 1515; Copenhagen six children	Ruled jointly in Schleswig, John and Frederick, brothers, ruled together, and after the death of John, Frederick, kept the co-rulership with his nephew, Christian II. In 1523 the latter was deposed in both Denmark and Schleswig. They were also in succession Kings of Denmark: John 1481–1513, Christian 1513–23, Frederick 1523–33. John and Christian were also Kings of the Kalmar Union.
Christian III (Christian 3.)	12 August 1503	1533-1544	1 January 1559	Schleswig	Dorothea of Saxe-Lauenburg; 29 October 1525; Lauenburg five children	Christian was also King of Denmark. In 1544 divided Schleswig with his half-brothers. John received Schleswig-Holstein-Haderslev, and Adolph Schleswig-Holstein-Gottorp.
Christian III (Christian 3.)	12 August 1503	1544-1559	1 January 1559	Schleswig-Schleswig	Dorothea of Saxe-Lauenburg; 29 October 1525; Lauenburg five children	Christian was also King of Denmark. In 1544 divided Schleswig with his half-brothers. John received Schleswig-Holstein-Haderslev, and Adolph Schleswig-Holstein-Gottorp.
John II the Elder	21 June 1521	1544-1580	1 October 1580	Schleswig-Holstein-Haderslev	Unmarried	Christian was also King of Denmark. In 1544 divided Schleswig with his half-brothers. John received Schleswig-Holstein-Haderslev, and Adolph Schleswig-Holstein-Gottorp.
Adolph	25 January 1526	1544-1586	1 October 1586	Schleswig-Holstein-Gottorp	Christine of Hesse; 17 December 1564; Schleswig ten children	Christian was also King of Denmark. In 1544 divided Schleswig with his half-brothers. John received Schleswig-Holstein-Haderslev, and Adolph Schleswig-Holstein-Gottorp.
Haderslev divided between Schleswig and Gottorp
Frederick II (Frederik 2.)	1 July 1534	1559-1588	4 April 1588	Schleswig-Schleswig	Sophie of Mecklenburg-Güstrow; 20 July 1572; Copenhagen eight children	Also King of Denmark.
Frederick II	21 April 1568	1586-1587	15 June 1587	Schleswig-Holstein-Gottorp	Unmarried	Died without descendants. He was succeeded by his brother.
Philip	10 August 1570	1587-1590	18 October 1590	Schleswig-Holstein-Gottorp	Unmarried	Died without descendants. He was succeeded by his brother.
Christian IV (Christian 4.)	12 April 1577	1588-1648	28 February 1648	Schleswig-Schleswig	Anne Catherine of Brandenburg; 27 November 1597; Haderslev seven children Kirsten Munk; 31 December 1615; Copenhagen (morganatic) twelve children	Also King of Denmark.
John Adolph	27 February 1575	1590-1616	31 March 1616	Schleswig-Holstein-Gottorp	Augusta of Denmark; 30 August 1596; Copenhagen eight children	
Frederick III	22 December 1597	1616-1659	10 August 1659	Schleswig-Holstein-Gottorp	Marie Elisabeth of Saxony; 21 February 1630; Dresden sixteen children	
Frederick III (Frederik 3.)	18 March 1609	1648-1670	9 February 1670	Schleswig-Schleswig	Sophie Amalie of Brunswick-Lüneburg; 1 October 1643; Glücksburg eight children	Also King of Denmark as Frederick III.
Christian Albert	3 February 1641	1659-1695	6 January 1695	Schleswig-Holstein-Gottorp	Frederica Amalia of Denmark; 24 October 1667; Glücksburg four children	
Christian V (Christian 5.)	15 April 1646	1670-1699	25 August 1699	Schleswig-Schleswig	Charlotte Amalie of Hesse-Kassel; 25 June 1667; Nykøbing Falster eight children	Also King of Denmark.
Frederick IV	18 October 1671	1695-1702	19 July 1702	Schleswig-Holstein-Gottorp	Hedvig Sophia of Sweden; 12 May 1698; Karlberg one child	
Frederick IV (Frederik 4.)	11 October 1671	1699-1730	12 October 1730	Schleswig-Schleswig (until 1713) Schleswig (after 1713)	Louise of Mecklenburg-Güstrow; 5 December 1695; Copenhagen five children Elisabeth Helene von Vieregg; 26 September 1703 (morganatic and bigamous) one child Anne Sophie Reventlow; 4 April 1721; Copenhagen three children	Also King of Denmark as Frederick IV. In 1713 reunited Schleswig.
Charles Frederick	30 April 1700	1702-1739	18 June 1739	Schleswig-Holstein-Gottorp (until 1713) Holstein-Gottorp (after 1713)	Anna Petrovna of Russia; 21 May 1725; St Petersburg one child	
Christian VI (Christian 6.)	30 November 1699	1730-1746	6 August 1746	Schleswig	Sophie Magdalene of Brandenburg-Kulmbach; 7 August 1721; Pretzsch three children	Also King of Denmark.
Charles Peter Ulrich	21 February 1728	1739-1762	17 July 1762	Holstein-Gottorp	Sophie Augusta of Anhalt-Zerbst; 21 August 1745; St Petersburg one child	He later ascended as Peter III of Russia.
Frederick V (Frederik 5.)	31 March 1723	1746-1766	14 January 1766	Schleswig	Louise of Great Britain; 11 December 1743; Altona five children Juliana Maria of Brunswick-Wolfenbüttel; 8 July 1752; Hillerød one son	Also King of Denmark as Frederick V.
Paul I	1 October 1754	1762-1773	23 March 1801	Holstein-Gottorp	Wilhelmina Louisa of Hesse-Darmstadt; 20 September 1773; St Petersburg no children Sophie Dorothea of Württemberg; 7 October 1776; St Petersburg ten children	He later succeeded his mother, Catherine the Great, Empress of Russia.
Gottorp reunited with Schleswig
Christian VII (Christian 7.)	29 January 1749	1766-1773	13 March 1808	Schleswig	Caroline Matilda of Great Britain; 8 November 1766; Copenhagen two children	Also King of Denmark. In 1773 reunited Schleswig and Holstein.
Christian VII (Christian 7.)	29 January 1749	1773-1808	13 March 1808	Schleswig and Holstein	Caroline Matilda of Great Britain; 8 November 1766; Copenhagen two children	Also King of Denmark. In 1773 reunited Schleswig and Holstein.
Frederick VI (Frederik 6.)	28 January 1768	1808-1839	8 December 1839	Schleswig and Holstein	Marie Sophie of Hesse-Kassel; 31 July 1790; Schleswig eight children	Also King of Denmark as Frederick VI.
Christian VIII (Christian 8.)	18 September 1786	1839-1848	20 January 1848	Schleswig and Holstein	Charlotte Frederica of Mecklenburg-Schwerin; 21 June 1806; Ludwigslust two children Caroline Amalie of Schleswig-Holstein-Sonderburg-Augustenburg; 22 May 1815; Augustenborg no children	Also King of Denmark.
Frederick VII (Frederik 7.)	6 October 1808	1848-1863	15 November 1863	Schleswig and Holstein	Vilhelmine Marie of Denmark; 1 November 1828; Copenhagen (annulled 1837) no children Caroline Mariane of Mecklenburg-Strelitz; 10 June 1841; Neustrelitz (annulled 1846) no children Louise Rasmussen; 7 August 1850; Hillerød (morganatic) no children	Also King of Denmark as Frederick VII.
Christian IX (Christian 9.)	8 April 1818	1863-1864	29 January 1906	Schleswig and Holstein	Louise of Hesse-Kassel; 26 May 1842; Copenhagen six children	He was from the Schleswig-Holstein-Sonderburg-Glücksburg branch of the Oldenburgs. Also King of Denmark. In 1864 the duchy was annexed to the Austrian Empire and the Kingdom of Prussia.

In 1864, following the Second Schleswig War, the Duchies of Schleswig and Holstein were ceded by the Danish King and were ruled in a joint condominium by Austria and Prussia. Following the defeat of Austria in the Austro-Prussian War in 1866, they were annexed by Prussia and were formed into the new Prussian Province of Schleswig-Holstein, part of Germany since 1870.

== Pretenders to Schleswig-Holstein ==
The death of Frederick VII in 1863 marked the extinction of the eldest line of the House of Oldenburg, and thus an heir to Denmark, and Schleswig-Holstein, had to be found. Prince Christian of Glücksburg was chosen as the heir to the kingdom and duchies in the London Protocol, however this sparked controversies since he was not the eldest male heir, rather that person was Prince Frederick of Augustenburg. Frederick titularly claimed the dual duchies after the extinction of the male line, proclaiming himself Frederick VIII of Schleswig and Holstein, something that would be continued by the eldest male heirs after him.

Duke	Portrait	Length of Claim
Frederick VIII (1829 – 1880)		15 November 1863 – 14 January 1880
Ernst Gunther (1863 – 1921)		14 January 1880 – 22 February 1921
Albert (1868 – 1931)		22 February 1921 – 27 April 1931
Friedrich Ferdinand I (1855 – 1934)		27 April 1931 – 21 January 1934
Wilhelm Friedrich (1891 – 1965)		21 January 1934 – 10 February 1965
Peter (1922 – 1980)		10 February 1965 – 30 September 1980
Christoph (1949 – 2023)		30 September 1980 – 27 September 2023
Friedrich Ferdinand II (1985 – present)		27 September 2023 – present

== See also ==
- List of Danish monarchs
- List of dukes of Schleswig
- Counts of Schauenburg and Holstein
