= Princess Alexandra of Saxe-Coburg and Gotha =

Princess of Hohenlohe-Langenburg from 1913 to 1942

Alexandra of Saxe-Coburg and Gotha
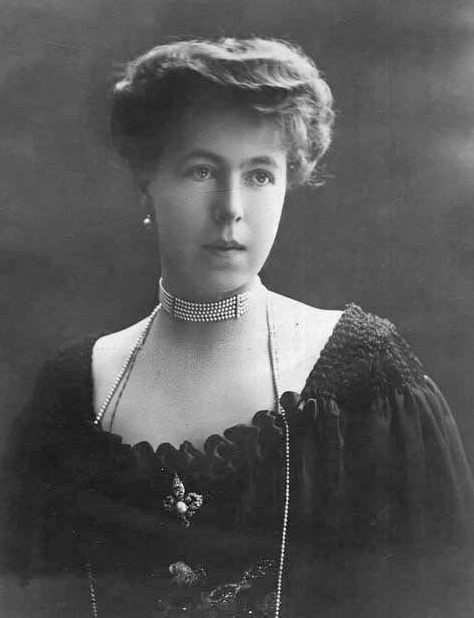
- Princess Alexandra in 1905

Princess consort of Hohenlohe-Langenburg
- Tenure: 9 March 1913 – 16 April 1942
- Born: Princess Alexandra of Edinburgh; 1 September 1878; Schloss Rosenau, Coburg, Duchy of Saxe-Coburg and Gotha, German Empire
- Died: 16 April 1942 (aged 63); Schwäbisch Hall, Free People's State of Württemberg, Nazi Germany
- Spouse: Ernst II, Prince of Hohenlohe-Langenburg (m. 1896)
- Issue: Gottfried, Prince of Hohenlohe-Langenburg; Marie Melita, Duchess of Schleswig-Holstein; Princess Alexandra; Princess Irma; Prince Alfred
Names
- Alexandra Louise Olga Victoria
- House: Saxe-Coburg and Gotha
- Father: Alfred, Duke of Saxe-Coburg and Gotha
- Mother: Grand Duchess Maria Alexandrovna of Russia

Princess Alexandra of Saxe-Coburg and Gotha (Alexandra Louise Olga Victoria; 1 September 1878 – 16 April 1942) was princess consort of Hohenlohe-Langenburg from her husband Ernst II's accession as prince in 1913 until her death in 1942. The fourth child and third daughter of Alfred, Duke of Saxe-Coburg and Gotha and Grand Duchess Maria Alexandrovna of Russia, she was also a granddaughter of both Queen Victoria of the United Kingdom and Tsar Alexander II of Russia.

During Alexandra's formative years, she was often overshadowed by her elder sisters Marie and Victoria Melita for being considered less attractive and more reserved. Emphasis was placed on faith, the arts, and sports during different parts of her upbringing, depending on the authority figure in charge of her education, which often changed between residences. In 1896, she married Ernst II, with whom she had five children, including Gottfried, Prince of Hohenlohe-Langenburg, and Marie Melita, Duchess of Schleswig-Holstein. She became princess consort on his accession as prince in 1913. She thereafter lived in Germany, where during the First World War, she worked as a nurse for the Red Cross. After the November Revolution in 1918, the power held by German dynasties was overthrown, and her title as princess retained only nominal status. She became an early supporter of the Nazi Party, joining in 1937, where she remained a member until her death at Schwäbisch Hall in 1942. Her personal papers are preserved in Neuenstein Castle, reflecting research interest in a figure linked by ancestry to both the British royal and Russian imperial houses.

== Early life ==
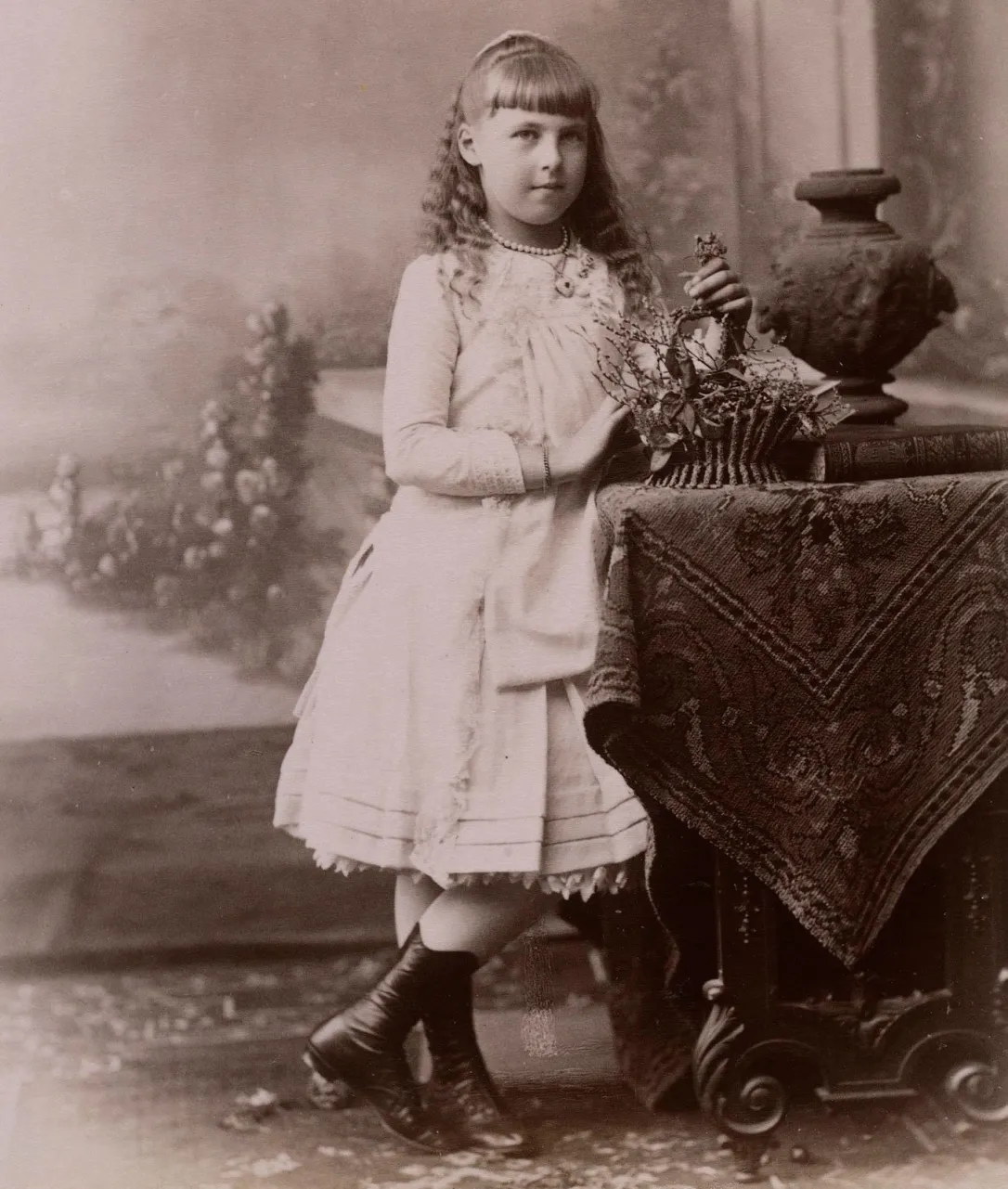
Alexandra, 1885

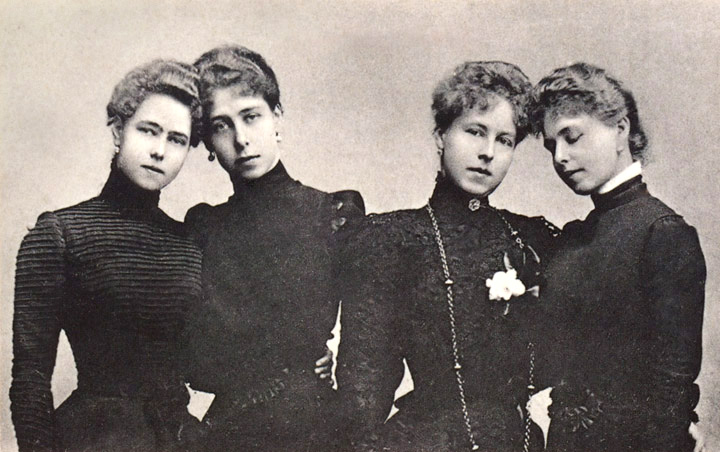
Princess Alexandra with her three sisters. From left to right, Princess Beatrice, Princess Victoria Melita, Princess Alexandra, and Princess Marie of Saxe-Coburg and Gotha.

Alexandra was born Princess Alexandra of Edinburgh on 1 September 1878 at Rosenau Castle, Coburg, during a family visit. Her father was Prince Alfred, Duke of Edinburgh, the second-eldest son of Queen Victoria of the United Kingdom and Prince Albert of Saxe-Coburg and Gotha. Her mother was Grand Duchess Maria Alexandrovna of Russia, the only surviving daughter of Alexander II of Russia and Marie of Hesse and by Rhine. She was baptized Alexandra Louise Olga Victoria on 2 October 1878 at Edinburgh Palace, Coburg, presumably by her mother's chaplain. Her godparents included her maternal uncle, Grand Duke Alexei Alexandrovich of Russia.

During Alexandra's formative years, her father, occupied with his career in the Royal Navy and later as a ruler in Coburg, paid little attention to his family. It was Alexandra's mother who was the domineering presence in their children's life. Alexandra had four siblings: Alfred, Marie, Victoria Melita, and Beatrice (her only younger sibling). Throughout her life, Alexandra was usually overshadowed by her elder sisters; she was considered less beautiful and more subdued than Marie and Victoria Melita.

Nicknamed 'Sandra' by her family, she spent her early years in England, where the family lived at Eastwell Park, which Maria Alexandrovna loved and preferred to the couple's official London residence, Clarence House. The Duke of Edinburgh was rarely at home, constantly serving in the navy. When he came home, he played a lot with the children, inventing new entertainments. All the children studied French, which they hated. In 1886, Duke Alfred was appointed commander of the Mediterranean Fleet. The family moved to Malta, where they settled in the San Anton Palace. During their first year in Malta, a French governess oversaw the princesses' education, but due to her failing health, she was replaced the following year by a much younger German woman. The palace always had rooms reserved for Prince George of Wales, the future King George V, who often visited them and called his cousins "three dear sisters".

She was a bridesmaid at the 1885 wedding of her aunt Princess Beatrice of the United Kingdom to Prince Henry of Battenberg, and at the wedding of the Duke and Duchess of York in 1893. That year, her great-uncle, The Duke of Saxe-Coburg and Gotha (brother of her paternal grandfather, Prince Albert of Saxe-Coburg and Gotha), died without issue. As Prince Albert had died, and her uncle, the Prince of Wales, had renounced his claim to the duchy, the ducal throne fell to the Duke of Edinburgh. Following her father's succession, though Alexandra remained a British princess, she took the title of Princess Alexandra of Saxe-Coburg and Gotha.

In 1889, the entire family moved to Coburg and settled in Rosenau Castle the family moved as her father was the heir apparent to the duchy of Saxe-Coburg and Gotha. Maria Alexandrovna hired a German governess for her daughters, who bought the girls simple clothes and taught them the Lutheran faith even though they had previously been raised as Anglicans. The children resented the governess and rebelled, and some of the new restrictions were eased. In Coburg, the princesses' education was broadened: more emphasis was placed on painting and music, which were taught by Anna Messing and Mrs. Helferich respectively. On Thursdays and Sundays, Alexandra and her sisters attended the theatre, which they all enjoyed. Another activity which the girls enjoyed at Coburg was attending winter parties organised by their mother, during which they would ice-skate and play different games, such as ice hockey.

== Marriage ==
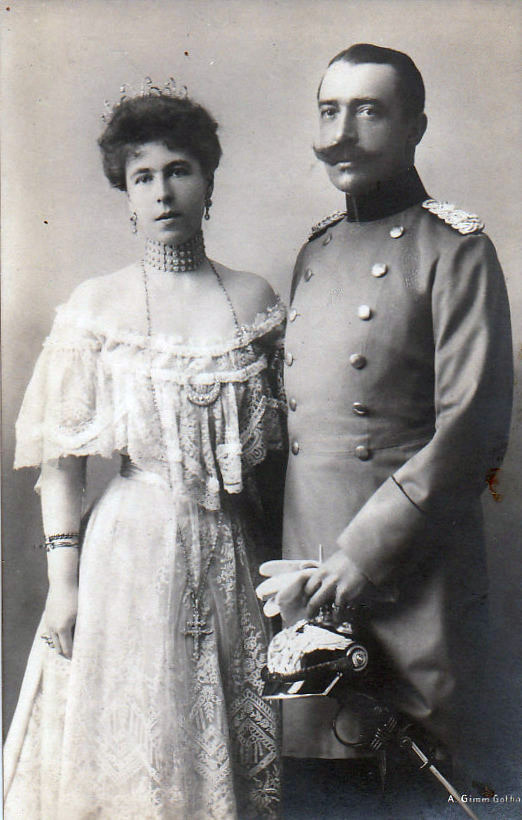
Princess Alexandra and her husband Ernst II, Prince of Hohenlohe-Langenburg.

Alexandra's mother, Grand Duchess Maria Alexandrovna, arranged her daughters' marriages. Maria Alexandrovna personally looked for suitable candidates for her daughter.

In 1893, the duke's eldest daughter, Marie, married Crown Prince Ferdinand, the heir to the Romanian throne. The following year, Victoria Melita, the second daughter, married her cousin, Grand Duke Ernst Ludwig of Hesse. At the end of 1895, she arranged the engagement of Alexandra to the German aristocrat Ernst of Hohenlohe-Langenburg, the son and heir of Prince Hermann of Hohenlohe-Langenburg and Princess Leopoldine of Baden. The couple married on 20 April 1896 at the Ehrenburg Palace (Schloss Ehrenburg) in Coburg.

Alexandra's grandmother, Queen Victoria, complained that she was too young to marry at 17 and Alexandra's father objected to the status of his future son-in-law, who was lower than Alexandra in rank. The House of Hohenlohe-Langenburg was mediatized, a formerly ruling family who had ceded their sovereign rights to others while – in theory – formally retaining their previous rank. It was not considered a brilliant match as Ernst was considered to be lower ranked than Alexandra.

=== Issue ===
Alexandra and her husband Ernst had five children, which included:

- Prince Gottfried, 8th Prince of Hohenlohe-Langenburg (24 March 1897 – 11 May 1960); married Princess Margarita of Greece and Denmark, the eldest sister of the future Prince Philip, Duke of Edinburgh, and had issue.
- Princess Marie Melita of Hohenlohe-Langenburg (18 January 1899 – 8 November 1967); married Wilhelm Friedrich, Duke of Schleswig-Holstein and had issue.
- Princess Alexandra of Hohenlohe-Langenburg (2 April 1901 – 26 October 1963).
- Princess Irma Helene of Hohenlohe-Langenburg (4 July 1902 – 8 March 1986)
- Prince Alfred Christian of Hohenlohe-Langenburg (16 April 1911 – 18 April 1911)

== Life in Hohenlohe-Langenburg ==
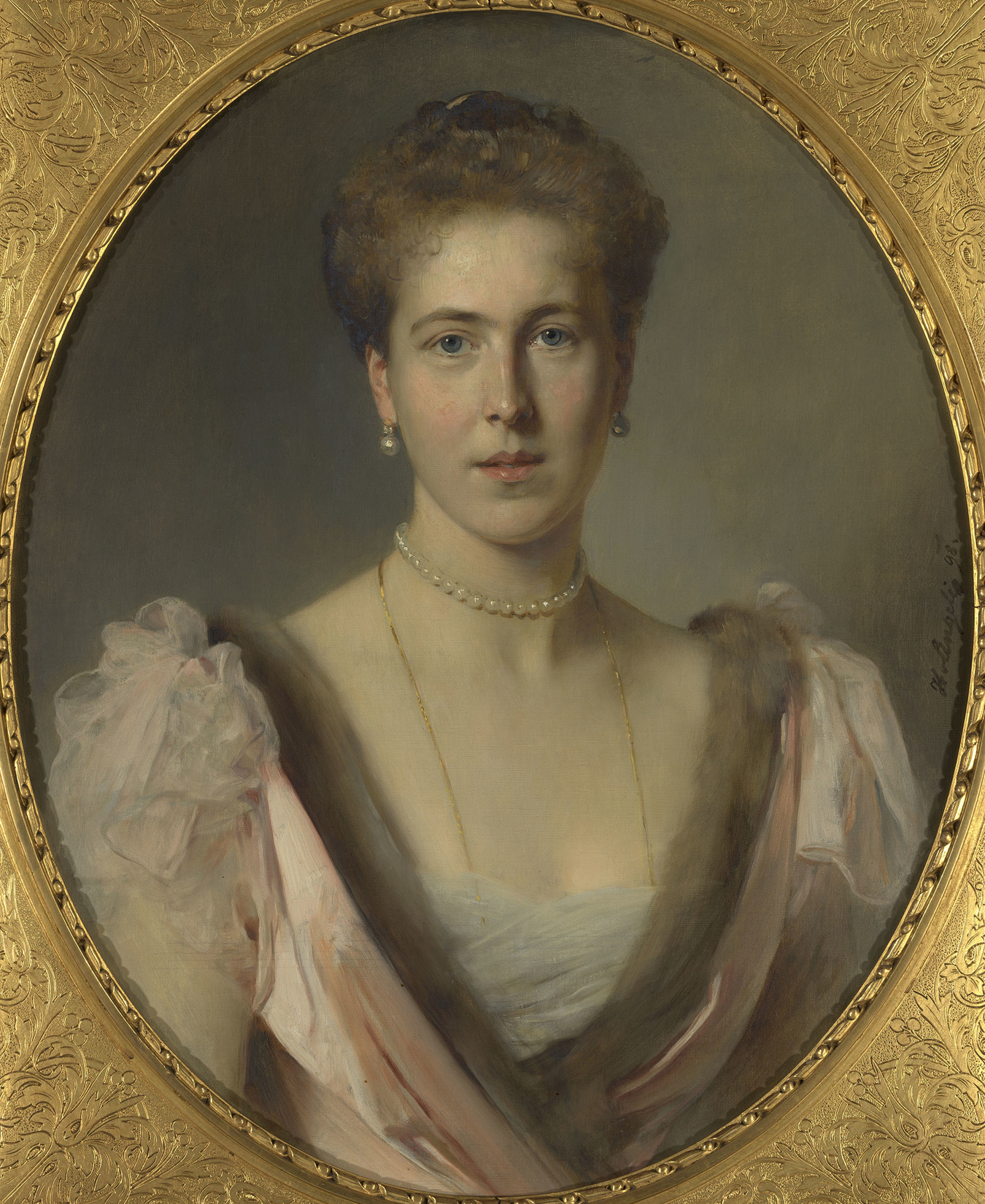
Painting by Heinrich von Angeli

After the wedding, Alexandra lived in Germany for the rest of her life. Alexandra's only brother, Alfred, had died in 1899, one year after in 1900, the Duke of Edinburgh and Saxe-Coburg and Gotha died, his wife and daughters were by his side during his last days. For the next five years, Alexandra's cousin Prince Karl Eduard, ruled under the regency of Alexandra's husband, the Hereditary Prince of Hohenlohe-Langenburg. Upon reaching the age of majority on 19 July 1905, Karl Eduard assumed all constitutional powers of the head of the Saxe-Coburg and Gotha state.

=== First World War ===
During World War I, she worked as a Red Cross nurse. In February 1916, her eldest daughter Marie Melita was married in Coburg to Prince Wilhelm Friedrich, the future Duke of Schleswig-Holstein, and Alexandra became a grandmother when the couple's first child Prince Hans was born in May 1917. After the November Revolution in Germany in 1918, which overthrew the power of the German dynasties, the Kingdom of Württemberg, which had mediatized the Principality of Hohenlohe since 1806, ceased to exist. Ernst lost his seat in the Württemberg parliament. From that time on, the couple bore the nominal title of Princes of Hohenlohe-Langenburg. In 1920, her mother Maria Alexandrovna died in Zurich.

=== Second World War and later life ===
On her thirty-fifth wedding anniversary in April 1931, her eldest son Gottfried married Princess Margarita of Greece and Denmark, elder sister of Prince Philip, Duke of Edinburgh and future sister-in-law to future Queen Elizabeth II. In the years preceding World War II, Alexandra was an early supporter of the Nazi Party, which she joined on 1 May 1937, together with her children. Her son, Gottfried, was an army officer during the Second World War. She became ill frequently in the 1930s; she died in Schwäbisch Hall, Baden-Württemberg, Nazi Germany on 16 April 1942.

== Archives ==
Personal coat of arms of Princess Alexandra of Edinburgh and Saxe-Coburg and Gotha

Princess Alexandra's personal papers (including family correspondence and photographs) are preserved in the Hohenlohe-Langenburg family archive (Nachlass Fürstin Alexandra, HZAN La 143), which is in the Hohenlohe Central Archive (Hohenlohe-Zentralarchiv Neuenstein) in Neuenstein Castle in the town of Neuenstein, Baden-Württemberg, Germany, and it is open for researchers.

== Ancestry ==
Ancestors of Princess Alexandra of Saxe-Coburg and Gotha

8. Ernest I, Duke of Saxe-Coburg and Gotha
4. Prince Albert of Saxe-Coburg and Gotha
9. Princess Louise of Saxe-Gotha-Altenburg
2. Alfred, Duke of Saxe-Coburg and Gotha
10. Prince Edward, Duke of Kent and Strathearn
5. Victoria of the United Kingdom
11. Princess Victoria of Saxe-Coburg-Saalfeld
1. Alexandra, Princess of Hohenlohe-Langenburg
12. Nicholas I of Russia
6. Alexander II of Russia
13. Princess Charlotte of Prussia
3. Grand Duchess Maria Alexandrovna of Russia
14. Louis II, Grand Duke of Hesse and by Rhine
7. Princess Marie of Hesse and by Rhine
15. Princess Wilhelmine of Baden

== Footnotes ==
=== References ===
- Zeepvat, Charlotte (1993). The other one: Alexandra of Hohenlohe-Langenburg. Royalty Digest Quarterly. ISSN 1653-5219.
- Grigoryan, Valentina (2011). Russian wives of European monarchs. Moscow: Valentina. ISBN 9785271331671.
- Grigoryan, Valentina (2006). The Romanovs. Biographical Handbook. — Moscow: Astrel. Valentina. ISBN 973502621X.
- Gauthier, Guy (2010). Missy, Regina României (in Russian). ISBN 978-9735026219.
- Maria, Maria (1990). Povestea Vieții Mele (in Romanian). Moldova: Maria. ISBN 973-9032-01-X.
- Mandache, Diana (2011). Later Chapters of My Life: The Lost Memoir of Queen Marie of Romania. Diana. ISBN 978-0750936910.
- Petropoulos, Jonathan (2006). Petropoulos Royals and the Reich. New York: АСТ. ISBN 9785271331671.
- Sullivan, Michael (1997). John A Fatal Passion The Story of the Uncrowned Last Empress of Russia. Random House. ISBN 0679424008.
- Klee, Ernst (2007). Das Kulturlexikon zum Dritten Reich. Wer war was vor und nach 1945. Frankfurt am Main: Klee. ISBN 978-3-10-039326-5.
- Huberty; Giraud; Magdelaine (1994). Dynastic Germany. ISBN 978-2-90113-807-5.
- Farah, Micheal (2020). Children of the Empire: The Extraordinary Lives of Queen Victoria's Children and Grandchildren. ISBN 9781800468078.
- Lane, Henry (1910). The Royal Daughters of England and Their Representatives. ASIN B00088EN3O.
