= Princess Caroline Mathilde of Schleswig-Holstein-Sonderburg-Augustenburg =

Princess Caroline Mathilde
- Duchess of Schleswig-Holstein
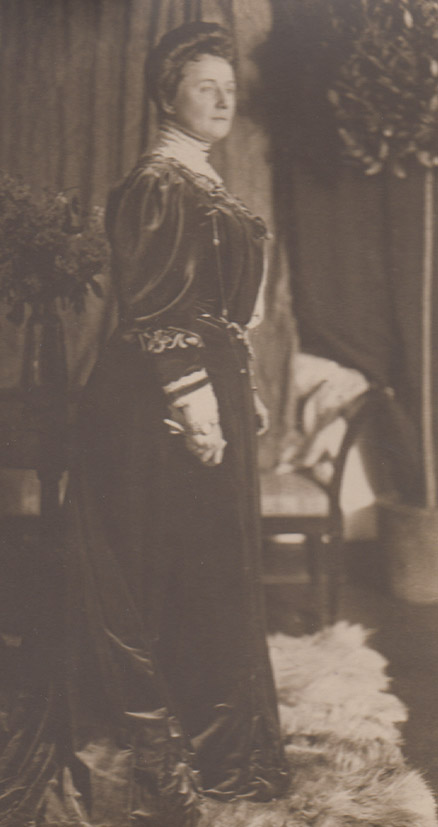
- Karoline in 1906
- Born: 25 January 1860; Augustenborg, Als, Duchy of Schleswig
- Died: 20 February 1932 (aged 72); Grünholz Castle, Thumby, Free State of Prussia, Weimar Republic
- Spouse: Friedrich Ferdinand, Duke of Schleswig-Holstein (m. 1885)
- Issue: Victoria Adelaide, Duchess of Saxe-Coburg and Gotha; Alexandra Victoria, Princess August Wilhelm of Prussia; Helena Adelaide, Princess Harald of Denmark; Adelaide, Princess of Solms-Baruth; Wilhelm Friedrich, Duke of Schleswig-Holstein; Karoline Mathilde, Countess Hans of Solms-Baruth
Names
- German: Viktoria Friederike Auguste Marie Caroline Mathilde
- House: Schleswig-Holstein-Sonderburg-Augustenburg
- Father: Frederick VIII, Duke of Schleswig-Holstein
- Mother: Princess Adelheid of Hohenlohe-Langenburg

Princess Caroline Mathilde of Schleswig-Holstein-Sonderburg-Augustenburg (Viktoria Friederike Auguste Marie Caroline Mathilde; 25 January 1860 – 20 February 1932) was the second-eldest daughter of Frederick VIII, Duke of Schleswig-Holstein and his wife Princess Adelheid of Hohenlohe-Langenburg.

== Family ==
Caroline Mathilde's elder sister, Augusta Viktoria was German Empress and Queen of Prussia as the wife of Wilhelm II, German Emperor. Caroline Mathilde was Duchess of Schleswig-Holstein-Sonderburg-Glücksburg and later Duchess of Schleswig-Holstein as the wife of Friedrich Ferdinand. Caroline's maternal grandmother Princess Feodora of Leiningen was the half-sister of Queen Victoria.

== Marriage and issue ==
Caroline Mathilde married Friedrich Ferdinand, the eldest son of Friedrich, Duke of Schleswig-Holstein-Sonderburg-Glücksburg and Princess Adelheid of Schaumburg-Lippe and a nephew of Christian IX of Denmark, on 19 March 1885 at Primkenau. Friedrich Ferdinand and Caroline Mathilde had six children:

- Princess Victoria Adelaide of Schleswig-Holstein-Sonderburg-Glücksburg (31 December 1885 – 3 October 1970)
- Princess Alexandra Victoria of Schleswig-Holstein-Sonderburg-Glücksburg (21 April 1887 – 15 April 1957)
- Princess Helena Adelaide of Schleswig-Holstein-Sonderburg-Glücksburg (1 June 1888 – 30 June 1962)
- Princess Adelaide of Schleswig-Holstein-Sonderburg-Glücksburg (19 October 1889 – 11 June 1964)
- Wilhelm Friedrich, Duke of Schleswig-Holstein (23 August 1891 – 10 February 1965)
- Princess Karoline Mathilde of Schleswig-Holstein-Sonderburg-Glücksburg (11 May 1894 – 28 January 1972)

After the overthrow of the Hohenzollern dynasty at the end of World War I, Caroline and her family lived quietly, seldom seen outside Grünholz Castle.

Caroline died on 20 February 1932, aged 72, at their castle. A few years previously, she had suffered an attack of heart disease and never completely recovered. Her husband was the only family member present at her deathbed.

== Ancestry ==
Ancestors of Princess Caroline Mathilde of Schleswig-Holstein-Sonderburg-Augustenburg

8. Frederick Christian II, Duke of Schleswig-Holstein-Sonderburg-Augustenburg
4. Christian Augustus II, Duke of Schleswig-Holstein-Sonderburg-Augustenburg
9. Princess Louise Augusta of Denmark
2. Frederick VIII, Duke of Schleswig-Holstein
10. Count Christian Danneskiold-Samsøe
5. Countess Louise Danneskiold-Samsøe
11. Henriette Kaas
1. Princess Caroline Mathilde of Schleswig-Holstein-Sonderburg-Augustenburg
12. Karl Ludwig, Prince of Hohenlohe-Langenburg
6. Ernst I, Prince of Hohenlohe-Langenburg
13. Countess Amalie Henriette of Solms-Baruth
3. Princess Adelheid of Hohenlohe-Langenburg
14. Emich Carl, Prince of Leiningen
7. Princess Feodora of Leiningen
15. Princess Victoria of Saxe-Coburg-Saalfeld

Princess Caroline Mathilde of Schleswig-Holstein-Sonderburg-Augustenburg House of Schleswig-Holstein-Sonderburg-Augustenburg Cadet branch of the House of Oldenburg Born: 25 January 1860 Died: 20 February 1932
German nobility
Preceded by Princess Adelheid of Schaumburg-Lippe	Duchess consort of Schleswig-Holstein-Sonderburg-Glücksburg; 27 November 1885 – 27 April 1931	Succeeded by Herself as Duchess consort of Schleswig-Holstein
Titles in pretence
Vacant Title last held by Princess Dorothea of Saxe-Coburg and Gotha	— TITULAR — Duchess consort of Schleswig-Holstein; 27 April 1931 – 20 February 1932; Reason for succession failure: Duchy annexed by Prussia in 1866	Succeeded by Princess Marie Melita of Hohenlohe-Langenburg
