= Friedrich Ferdinand, Duke of Schleswig-Holstein =

Duke of Schleswig-Holstein (1855–1934)

Friedrich Ferdinand
- Duke of Schleswig-Holstein
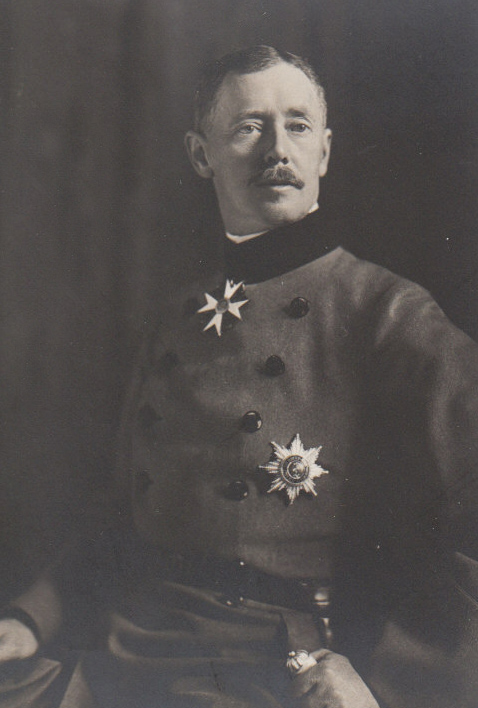
- Photograph by Nicola Perscheid, 1909

Head of the House of Schleswig-Holstein-Sonderburg-Glücksburg
- Reign: 27 November 1885– 21 January 1934
- Predecessor: Friedrich
- Successor: Wilhelm Friedrich
- Born: 12 October 1855; Kiel, Danish Holstein, Germany)
- Died: 21 January 1934 (aged 78); Primkenau, Province of Silesia, Free State of Prussia, Nazi Germany
- Spouse: Princess Karoline Mathilde of Schleswig-Holstein-Sonderburg-Augustenburg (m. 1885; died 1932)
- Issue: Victoria Adelaide, Duchess of Saxe-Coburg and Gotha; Alexandra Victoria, Princess August Wilhelm of Prussia; Helena, Princess Harald of Denmark; Adelaide, Princess of Solms-Baruth; Wilhelm Friedrich, Duke of Schleswig-Holstein; Karoline Mathilde, Countess Hans of Solms-Baruth
Names
- Frederick Ferdinand George Christian Charles William; German: Friedrich Ferdinand Georg Christian Karl Wilhelm
- House: Glücksburg
- Father: Friedrich, Duke of Schleswig-Holstein-Sonderburg-Glücksburg
- Mother: Princess Adelheid of Schaumburg-Lippe

Friedrich Ferdinand, Duke of Schleswig-Holstein-Sonderburg-Glücksburg, then Friedrich Ferdinand, Duke of Schleswig-Holstein (12 October 1855 – 21 January 1934), was the fourth Duke of Schleswig-Holstein-Sonderburg-Glücksburg and became the fifth Duke of Schleswig-Holstein in 1931 and the head of the House of Oldenburg.

== Family and succession ==
Friedrich Ferdinand was born in Kiel, Duchy of Holstein, the eldest son of Friedrich, Duke of Schleswig-Holstein-Sonderburg-Glücksburg and Princess Adelheid of Schaumburg-Lippe and a nephew of Christian IX of Denmark. Friedrich Ferdinand succeeded to the headship of the House of Schleswig-Holstein-Sonderburg-Glücksburg and title duke upon the death of his father on 27 November 1885. When the Head of the House of Schleswig-Holstein-Sonderburg-Augustenburg Albert, Duke of Schleswig-Holstein died on 27 April 1931, Friedrich Ferdinand became the Head of the House of Oldenburg and inherited the title Duke of Schleswig-Holstein.

== Marriage and issue ==
Friedrich Ferdinand married Princess Karoline Mathilde of Schleswig-Holstein-Sonderburg-Augustenburg, daughter of Frederick VIII, Duke of Schleswig-Holstein-Sonderburg-Augustenburg and his wife Princess Adelheid of Hohenlohe-Langenburg (and sister of Augusta Victoria, German Empress), on 19 March 1885 at Primkenau. Friedrich Ferdinand and Karoline Mathilde had six children:

- Princess Viktoria Adelheid Helene Luise Marie Friederike of Schleswig-Holstein-Sonderburg-Glücksburg (31 December 1885 – 3 October 1970)
- Princess Alexandra Viktoria Auguste Leopoldine Charlotte Amalie Wilhelmine of Schleswig-Holstein-Sonderburg-Glücksburg (21 April 1887 – 15 April 1957)
- Princess Helene Adelheid Viktoria Marie of Schleswig-Holstein-Sonderburg-Glücksburg (1 June 1888 – 30 June 1962)
- Princess Adelheid Luise of Schleswig-Holstein-Sonderburg-Glücksburg (19 October 1889 – 11 June 1964)
- Wilhelm Friedrich Christian Günther Albert Adolf Georg, Duke of Schleswig-Holstein (23 August 1891 – 10 February 1965)
- Princess Karoline Mathilde of Schleswig-Holstein-Sonderburg-Glücksburg (11 May 1894 – 28 January 1972)

== Death ==
Friedrich Ferdinand died in 1934 at Hause Eckernförde close to Güby in Schleswig-Holstein, Germany, aged 78.

== Honours ==
He received the following orders and decorations:

- Duchy of Anhalt: Grand Cross of Albert the Bear, 1886
- Denmark: Knight of the Elephant, 8 April 1876
- (Saxe-Coburg and Gotha) (Duchy of Saxe-Altenburg) (Saxe-Meiningen) Ernestine duchies: Grand Cross of the Saxe-Ernestine House Order
- Kingdom of Greece: Grand Cross of the Redeemer
- Oldenburg: Grand Cross of the Order of Duke Peter Friedrich Ludwig, with Golden Crown and Collar
- Kingdom of Prussia:
  - Knight of the Red Eagle, 1st Class, 22 March 1886; Grand Cross, 7 September 1890
  - Knight of the Black Eagle, 24 December 1892; with Collar, 17 January 1893
- United Kingdom: Honorary Grand Cross of the Royal Victorian Order, 11 October 1905
- Württemberg: Grand Cross of the Württemberg Crown, 1877

Friedrich Ferdinand, Duke of Schleswig-Holstein House of Schleswig-Holstein-Sonderburg-Glücksburg Cadet branch of the House of Oldenburg Born: 12 October 1855 Died: 21 January 1934
German nobility
Preceded by Friedrich	Duke of Schleswig-Holstein-Sonderburg-Glücksburg; 27 November 1885–27 April 1931	Succeeded by Himself as Duke of Schleswig-Holstein
Preceded by Albert	Duke of Schleswig-Holstein; 27 April 1931–21 January 1934	Succeeded by Wilhelm Friedrich
