= Princess Adelheid of Hohenlohe-Langenburg =

Duchess of Schleswig-Holstein from 1869 to 1880

Adelheid of Hohenlohe-Langenburg
- Duchess of Schleswig-Holstein
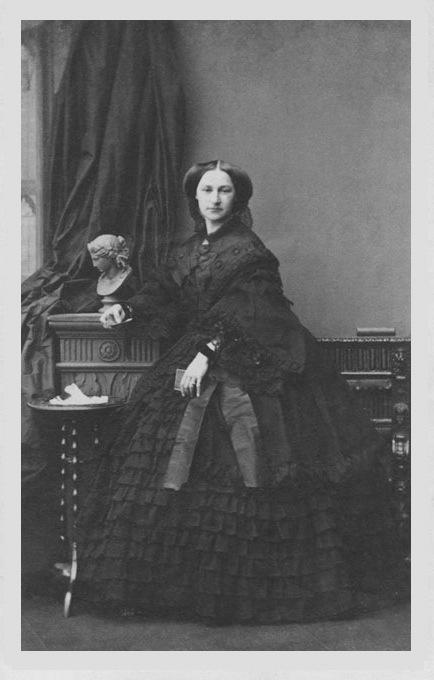
- Adelheid in 1860

Duchess consort of Schleswig-Holstein
- Tenure: 11 March 1869 – 14 January 1880
- Born: 20 July 1835; Langenburg, Kingdom of Württemberg
- Died: 25 January 1900 (aged 64); Dresden, Kingdom of Saxony, German Empire
- Spouse: Frederick VIII, Duke of Schleswig-Holstein (m. 1856; died 1880)
- Issue more...: Augusta Victoria, German Empress; Karoline Mathilde, Duchess of Schleswig-Holstein-Sonderburg-Glücksburg; Ernst Günther II, Duke of Schleswig-Holstein; Princess Louise; Princess Feodora
Names
- Adelheid Victoria Amalie Louise Maria Konstanze
- House: Hohenlohe-Langenburg
- Father: Ernst I, Prince of Hohenlohe-Langenburg
- Mother: Princess Feodora of Leiningen

Princess Adelheid of Hohenlohe-Langenburg (20 July 1835 – 25 January 1900) was the Duchess of Schleswig-Holstein-Sonderburg-Augustenburg by marriage to Frederick VIII, Duke of Schleswig-Holstein.

== Early life ==
Adelheid was born the second daughter of Ernst I, Prince of Hohenlohe-Langenburg and Princess Feodora of Leiningen, who was the older, maternal half-sister of the British Queen Victoria. Consequently, Adelheid was Queen Victoria's half-niece. She was nicknamed "Ada" by her family.

== Napoleon III's proposal of marriage ==
In 1852, not long after Napoléon III became Emperor of the French, he made a proposal of marriage to Adelheid's parents after he had been rebuffed by Princess Carola of Sweden. Although he had never met her, the political advantages of the marriage for the Emperor were obvious. It would provide dynastic respectability for the Bonaparte line, and could promote a closer alliance between France and Britain, because Adelheid was Queen Victoria's niece. At the same time, she was not officially a member of the British royal family, so the risk of refusal was small. Adelheid could be expected to be grateful enough for her good fortune to convert to Roman Catholicism.

As it turned out, the proposal horrified Queen Victoria and Prince Albert, who preferred not to confer such hasty legitimacy upon France's latest "revolutionary" regime — the durability of which was deemed dubious — nor to yield up a young kinswoman for the purpose. The British court maintained a strict silence toward the Hohenlohes during the marriage negotiations, lest the Queen seem either eager for or repulsed by the prospect of Napoléon as a nephew-in-law.

The parents, accurately interpreting the British silence as disapproval, declined the French offer—to their sixteen-year-old daughter's dismay. This may have been only a maneuver by the Hohenlohe family to obtain concessions from the French to secure their daughter's future interests. But before his ministers could press his case with further inducements, Napoléon gave up pursuit of a royal consort. Instead he offered marriage to Eugénie de Montijo, Countess of Teba, whom he had been simultaneously soliciting to become his mistress, and who had refused his advances.

== Marriage and children ==
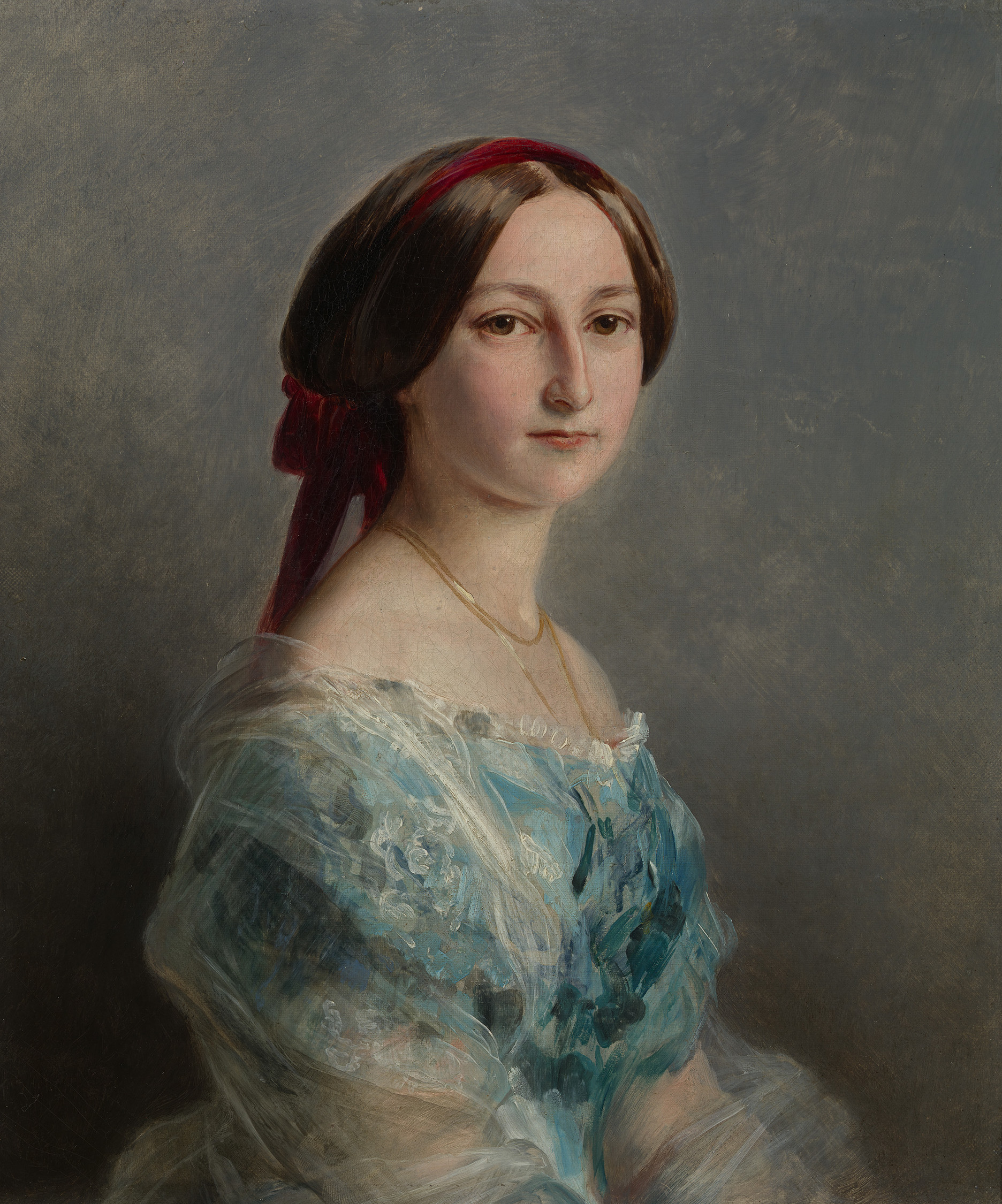
Portrait by Franz Xaver Winterhalter (1853), at the Royal Collection.

On September 11, 1856, Adelheid married Frederick VIII, Duke of Schleswig-Holstein. They were parents to seven children:

- Prince Friedrich of Schleswig-Holstein-Sonderburg-Augustenburg (3 August 1857 – 29 October 1858) he died at the age of fourteen months.
- Princess Augusta Victoria of Schleswig-Holstein-Sonderburg-Augustenburg (22 October 1858 – 11 April 1921) she married Wilhelm II of Germany on 27 February 1881. They had seven children.
- Princess Karoline Mathilde of Schleswig-Holstein-Sonderburg-Augustenburg (25 January 1860 – 20 February 1932) she married Friedrich Ferdinand, Duke of Schleswig-Holstein on 19 March 1885. They had six children.
- Prince Gerhard of Schleswig-Holstein-Sonderburg-Augustenburg (20 January 1862 – 11 April 1862) he died at the age of two months.
- Ernst Günther II, Duke of Schleswig-Holstein (11 August 1863 – 21 February 1921) he married Princess Dorothea of Saxe-Coburg and Gotha on 2 August 1898.
- Princess Louise Sophie of Schleswig-Holstein-Sonderburg-Augustenburg (8 April 1866 – 28 April 1952) she married Prince Friedrich Leopold of Prussia on 24 June 1889. They had four children.
- Princess Feodora Adelheid of Schleswig-Holstein-Sonderburg-Augustenburg (3 July 1874 – 21 June 1910).

Via her daughters Karoline Mathilde and Augusta Victoria, Adelheid is the most recent common matrilineal ancestor of Carl XVI Gustaf of Sweden and Felipe VI of Spain, respectively.

== Later life ==
With her husband, the Duchess first resided at Dolzig Palace, in Lower Lusatia, but in 1863 moved to Kiel when Duke Frederick became legitimate heir to the duchies of Schleswig-Holstein. They returned to Dolzig only three years later, when after the Austrian-Prussian War the duchies were annexed by Prussia. In the following years the couple alternated between Dolzig, Gotha, and the family domains at Primkenau. Duke Frederick died in 1880, shortly before the couple's eldest daughter was engaged to the Prussian heir. After the marriage in February 1881, Duchess Adelheid settled in Dresden, where she lived a retired life, interesting herself chiefly in painting and music.

The Duchess died at Dresden on 25 January 1900.

A small island in Franz Josef Land, Adelaide Island (Остров Аделаиды), was named after Princess Adelheid by the Austro-Hungarian North Pole Expedition. A fictionalised version of Princess Adelheid appears in the ITV series Victoria, where she is nicknamed "Heidi" and played by actress Ellen Evans.

== Ancestry ==
Ancestors of Princess Adelheid of Hohenlohe-Langenburg

8. Christian Albrecht, Prince of Hohenlohe-Langenburg
4. Karl Ludwig, Prince of Hohenlohe-Langenburg
9. Princess Caroline of Stolberg-Gedern
2. Ernst I, Prince of Hohenlohe-Langenburg
10. Johann Christian II, Count of Solms-Baruth
5. Countess Amalie Henriette of Solms-Baruth
11. Countess Friederike Reuss of Köstritz
1. Princess Adelheid of Hohenlohe-Langenburg
12. Carl Friedrich Wilhelm, Prince of Leiningen
6. Emich Carl, Prince of Leiningen
13. Countess Christiane Wilhelmine of Solms-Rödelheim and Assenheim
3. Princess Feodora of Leiningen
14. Francis, Duke of Saxe-Coburg-Saalfeld
7. Princess Victoria of Saxe-Coburg-Saalfeld
15. Countess Augusta Reuss of Ebersdorf
