= Frederick VIII of Schleswig-Holstein =

Frederick VIII
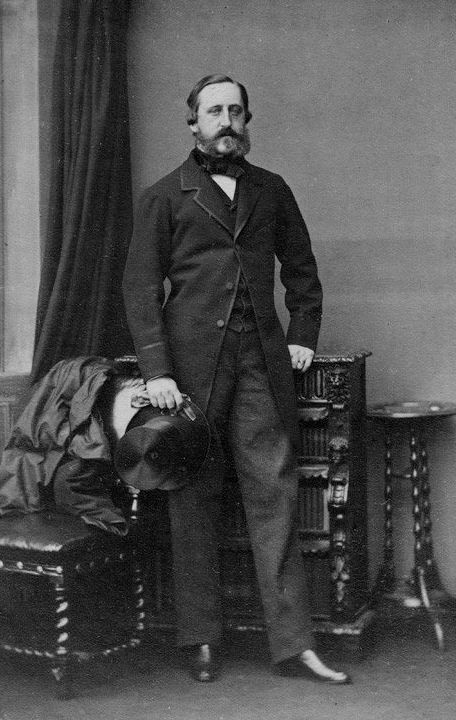
- Frederick VIII c. 1860s

Duke of Schleswig-Holstein
- Predecessor: Frederick VII
- Successor: Ernst Gunther

Duke of Schleswig-Holstein-Sonderburg-Augustenburg
- Predecessor: Christian August II
- Successor: Ernst Gunther
- Born: 6 July 1829; Augustenborg, Schleswig, Denmark
- Died: 14 January 1880 (aged 50); Wiesbaden, Hesse-Nassau, Prussia, Germany
- Spouse: Princess Adelheid of Hohenlohe-Langenburg (m. 1856)
- Issue more...: Augusta Viktoria, German Empress; Karoline Mathilde, Duchess of Schleswig-Holstein; Ernst Günther II, Duke of Schleswig-Holstein; Louise Sophie, Princess Friedrich Leopold of Prussia; Princess Feodora
Names
- Frederick Christian Augustus; German: Friedrich Christian August
- House: Schleswig-Holstein-Sonderburg-Augustenburg
- Father: Christian August II, Duke of Schleswig-Holstein-Sonderburg-Augustenburg
- Mother: Countess Louise Sophie Danneskiold-Samsøe

Frederick VIII, Duke of Schleswig-Holstein and of Schleswig-Holstein-Sonderburg-Augustenburg (Danish: Frederik Christian August af Slesvig-Holsten-Sønderborg-Augustenborg; German: Friedrich Christian August Herzog von Schleswig-Holstein-Sonderburg-Augustenburg; 6 July 1829 – 14 January 1880) was the German pretender to the throne of second duke of Schleswig-Holstein from 1863, although in reality Prussia took overlordship and real administrative power.

== Life ==
He was the eldest son of Christian August II, Duke of Schleswig-Holstein-Sonderburg-Augustenburg and Countess Louise Sophie of Danneskiold-Samsøe. He was ethnically perhaps the most Danish Prince of the Danish Royal dynasty in his generation (at the time of Denmark's most recent succession crisis).

His family belonged to the House of Oldenburg, the royal house that included all the medieval Scandinavian royal dynasties among its distant forebears - which it shared with his rivals and relatives, other claimants to the Danish throne. Both lines claim descent from the medieval Danish House of Estridsen via Christian I of Denmark's ancestress Richeza of Denmark, Lady of Werle, the daughter of Eric V of Denmark, but Frederick also descended from Eric V's son Christopher II of Denmark whom no heir or monarch of Denmark had been descended from since Christopher III of Denmark. Frederik's paternal grandfather happened to have both grandfathers who were "Royal" dukes from the Oldenburg dynasty.

Frederick also differed from his rivals in his specific ancestry among the contemporary Danish high nobility. His mother was from an ancient Danish family (Danneskiold-Samsøe), and his paternal grandmother Louise Auguste of Denmark was its royal princess. His paternal grandfather Frederik Christian II, Duke of Augustenborg numbered two ladies of Danish high nobility as his grandmothers (Danneskiold-Samsøe and Reventlow), and one Danish Countess as paternal great-grandmother (Ahlefeldt-Langeland). Frederick's family had high hopes that in the then-rising era of nationalism, this ancestry would be viewed with favour when the legal question over whose claim was strongest would be decided. The family groomed Frederick to become a King of Denmark.

Unfortunately, Frederick, despite his more ethnically Danish ancestry was to become a symbol of German nationalism. Insider circles of Danish Royal government, for various reasons, were not favourable to the Augustenburgs. Instead, the Princess of Hesse and Prince of Glucksburg, closer relatives of the then royal family's core, were preferred. Prince Frederick's father became a protagonist in the 1848-1851 First Schleswig War, to the hostility of Danish nationalists.

Prince Frederick's inherited claims were strongest to the almost wholly German-speaking Duchy of Holstein, while his rights as the heir-male of the House of Oldenburg proved too difficult to pursue, and Holstein, an originally Holy Roman Empire fief, had the Salic Law as a leading principle in its fundamental succession law. Schleswig and Denmark, much more Scandinavian in legal history, had legal precedents for elective and female succession. Frederick and his father, however Danish they actually were, realised this and leant towards German interests.

Young Frederick's father found himself in an untenable position after the collapse of Prussian support and defeat of his own government at the end of the First Schleswig War in 1851. He renounced his claims as first in line to inherit the twin duchies in favour of the king of Denmark and his successors on 31 March 1852 in return for a financial compensation. The ducal family was banished. Frederick now became the symbol of the nationalist German independence movement in Schleswig-Holstein. The renunciation was a hurdle which was explained away by the Augustenburg dynasty and the German nationalists as not having any effect on Frederick, who had not personally renounced anything and on whose behalf no one, including the father, was empowered to make renunciations. Frederick's marriage in 1856 was part of an appeal to German nationalism (however, his younger brother married a daughter of Queen Victoria).

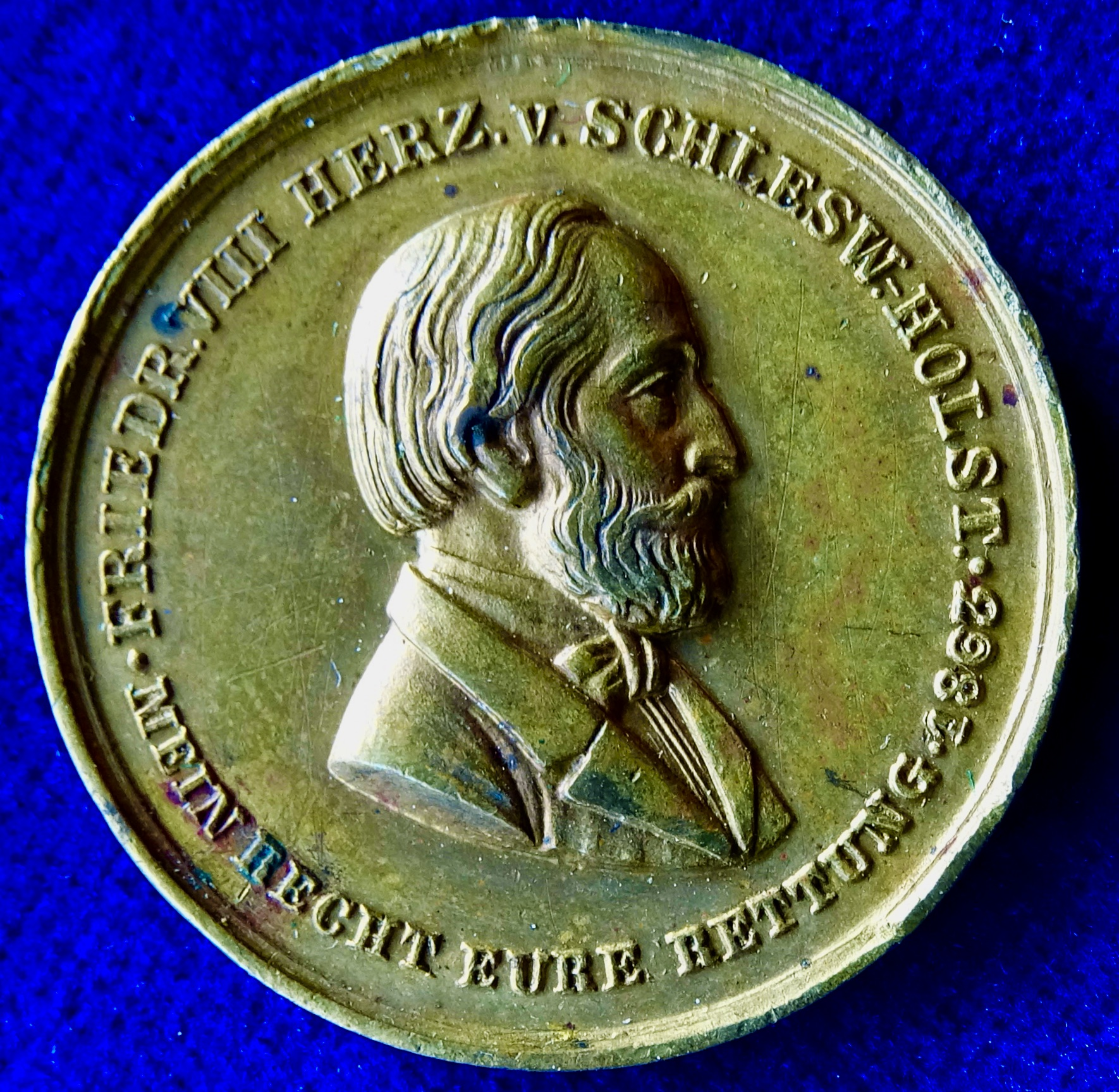
Medal of Frederick VIII 1864 worn by his supporters during the Augustenburgische Bewegung for Schleswig-Holstein to join the German Confederation

In November 1863 Frederick claimed the twin-duchies in succession after the death without a male heir of King Frederick VII of Denmark, who was also the Duke of Schleswig and Holstein. As Holstein was inherited after the salic law among descendants of Hedwig of Holstein, the independence movement had long nourished hopes that the king's death would lead to their goal. The Kingdom of Denmark was also under so-called Semi-Salic Law, but its male line ended with Frederick VII and Danish law contained a Semi-Salic provision which resulted in the election of Christian of Glücksburg as new monarch. German nationalists claimed that Schleswig was also inherited according to the unmodified Salic Law, but this claim was refused by the Danish government, arguing that this province was subject to Danish law.

Otto von Bismarck used the turbulence to invade the duchies in a Second War of Schleswig. The rule of Denmark in the duchies was terminated, and Frederick triumphantly entered Kiel, where he was eagerly welcomed. However, numerous political complications arose which prevented the formal reinstatement of the dynasty. By the terms of the Treaty of Vienna (October, 1864), the duchies were relinquished to Prussia and Austria, to be disposed of by them. Prussia, however, imposed conditions upon Frederick which made it impossible for him to assume the government. After the Peace of Prague, which terminated the Austro-Prussian War of 1866, the lands were finally absorbed into the Kingdom of Prussia.

Frederick subsequently served on the staff of the Crown Prince, Frederick William of Prussia, during the Franco-Prussian War of 1870-71. Frederick and his heirs continued to use their title, which after the next generation passed to the Glucksburg branch, to heirs of an elder brother of Christian IX of Denmark.

== Marriage and children ==
On September 11, 1856 Frederick married Princess Adelheid of Hohenlohe-Langenburg, a German. She was the second daughter of Ernst Christian Carl IV, Duke of Hohenlohe-Langenburg and Princess Feodora of Leiningen, elder half-sister of Queen Victoria. They were parents to seven children:

1. Prince Friedrich Wilhelm Victor Karl Ernst Christian August (August 3, 1857 – October 20, 1858).
2. Princess Auguste Viktoria Friederike Luise Feodora Jenny (October 22, 1858 – April 11, 1921). Married Wilhelm II, German Emperor.
3. Princess Victoria Friederike Augusta Maria Karoline Mathilde (January 25, 1860 – February 20, 1932). Married Friedrich Ferdinand, Duke of Schleswig-Holstein-Sonderburg-Glücksburg
4. Prince Friedrich Viktor Leopold Christian Gerhard (January 20, 1862 – April 11, 1862).
5. Ernst Günther II, Duke of Schleswig-Holstein-Sonderburg-Augustenburg, Duke of Schleswig-Holstein (August 11, 1863 – February 21, 1921).
6. Princess Feodora Louise Sophie Adelheid Henriette Amalie (April 8, 1866 – April 28, 1952). Married Prince Friedrich Leopold of Prussia. He was a male-line great-grandson of Frederick William III of Prussia.
7. Princess Feodora Adelheid Helene Luise Karoline Gustave Pauline Alice Jenny (July 3, 1874 – June 21, 1910).

Frederick VIII of Schleswig-Holstein House of Schleswig-Holstein-Sonderburg-Augustenburg Cadet branch of the House of Oldenburg Born: 6 July 1829 Died: 14 January 1880
German nobility
| Preceded by Frederick VII | Duke of Schleswig-Holstein; 15 November 1863–14 January 1880 | Succeeded by Ernst Günther II |
| Preceded by Christian Augustus II | Duke of Schleswig-Holstein-Sonderburg-Augustenburg; 11 March 1869–14 January 1880 | Succeeded by Ernst Günther II as Duke of Schleswig-Holstein |
