= Ernst II, Prince of Hohenlohe-Langenburg =

Ernst II
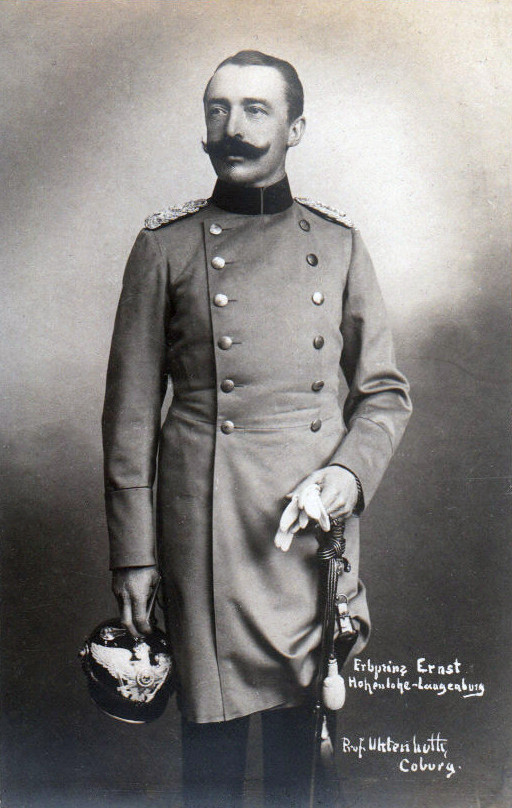
- Ernst II, when Hereditary Prince

Prince of Hohenlohe-Langenburg
- Tenure: 9 March 1913 – 11 December 1950
- Predecessor: Hermann
- Successor: Gottfried
- Born: 13 September 1863; Langenburg, Kingdom of Württemberg
- Died: 11 December 1950 (aged 87); Langenburg, Württemberg-Baden, West Germany
- Spouse: Alexandra of Edinburgh (m. 1896; died 1942)
- Issue: Gottfried, Prince of Hohenlohe-Langenburg; Marie Melita, Duchess of Schleswig-Holstein; Princess Alexandra; Princess Irma; Prince Alfred
- House: Hohenlohe-Langenburg
- Father: Hermann, Prince of Hohenlohe-Langenburg
- Mother: Princess Leopoldine of Baden

Ernst, 7th Prince of Hohenlohe-Langenburg (Ernst Wilhelm Friedrich Carl Maximilian, 7. Fürst zu Hohenlohe-Langenburg; 13 September 1863 – 11 December 1950) was a German aristocrat and Prince of Hohenlohe-Langenburg. He served as the Regent of the Duchy of Saxe-Coburg and Gotha during the minority of his wife's cousin, Duke Charles Edward, from 1900 to 1905.

== Biography ==
=== Family ===
Born in Langenburg, Kingdom of Württemberg on 13 September 1863, Ernst was the oldest of three children, and the only son, of Hermann, Prince of Hohenlohe-Langenburg, and Princess Leopoldine of Baden, daughter of Prince William of Baden. He was the grand-nephew of Queen Victoria; his paternal grandmother was Feodora of Leiningen, Victoria’s elder half-sister. His paternal great-grandmother was Princess Victoria of Saxe-Coburg-Saalfeld, Duchess of Kent and Strathearn, the mother of Princess Feodora and Queen Victoria. He married the Queen's granddaughter, Princess Alexandra of Edinburgh, daughter of Alfred, Duke of Saxe-Coburg and Gotha and Maria Alexandrovna of Russia, on 20 April 1896 at the Ehrenburg Palace (Schloss Ehrenburg) in Coburg, Germany. He was known as "Erni" to his relatives.

=== Education ===
After finishing high school in Karlsruhe, the young prince studied law in Paris, Bonn, Tübingen and Leipzig, where he graduated in 1885 with the first legal exam in Naumburg. He also gained membership in the Corps Suevia Tübingen (1st Class) in 1884, when he was at the University of Tübingen and Borussia Bonn in 1886, because he had gone to the University of Bonn.

=== Career ===
Ernst served as a Sekondelieutenant in the 2nd Guards Dragoon Regiment (2. Garde-Dragoner-Regiment) of the Prussian Army from 1885 to 1891, and was separated from active military when he entered diplomatic service. He underwent diplomatic training in Berlin and London from 1889 to 1891 and passed the diplomatic examination on 15 July 1891. On 3 August 1891, he was named a Legation Secretary (Legationssekretär) and appointed as Secretary at the Imperial German Embassies in St. Petersburg (1891-1892) and London (1892-1894). From 1894 to 1897, he was detached to work in Strasbourg as an assistant to his father, Prince Hermann, who was the Imperial Governor of Alsace-Lorraine. He left the diplomatic service on 18 November 1897 as a Legationsrat in order to officially enter the administrative service of Alsace-Lorraine. He also prepared himself for his future role as a Peer of the Kingdom of Württemberg.

Because his wife was the daughter of Alfred, Duke of Saxe-Coburg and Gotha, Ernst became the Regent of the Duchy after the death of the Duke. From 30 July 1900 to 18 July 1905, he governed Saxe-Coburg and Gotha on the behalf of the still immature successor, Charles Edward.

Afterwards, he made several unsuccessful attempts to gain a foothold in the politics of the German Empire. He represented the director of the Colonial Department (Kolonialabteilung ) of the Foreign Office (Auswärtiges Amt) from 1905 to 1906. He was a deputy for the Deutsche Reichspartei in the Reichstag from January 1907 to January 1912, and was 1st Vice President of the Reichstag from 1909 to 1910.

In 1913, on the death of his father, Ernst became the Prince of Hohelohe-Langeburg, entitling him to sit in the Kammer der Standesherren (House of Lords) of the Kingdom of Württemberg, where he had already been serving as his father's representative since 1895. He would keep his seat until the November Revolution of 1918.

Though no longer an active officer, Ernst remained an officer à la suite to the Prussian Army and had been given the Charakter of Major à la suite on 11 September 1903. During the First World War, the Prince was active in voluntary military medical aid efforts (freiwillige Krankenpflege). He was promoted to Oberstleutnant à la suite of the army on 24 December 1914. From 19 July 1915 to 5 October 1915, he was sent as a special envoy to the German Embassy in Constantinople and to the Balkans to assume the duties of the envoy Hans Freiherr von Wangenheim who had fallen ill. He later served as the General Delegate to the staff of the Supreme Commander East (Oberbefehlshaber Ost) on the Eastern Front and on 10 July 1918 became the Imperial Commissioner and Military Inspector of Voluntary Medical Aid (Kaiserlicher Kommissar und Militärinspekteur der freiwilligen Krankenpflege).

=== Relationship with the Nazi Party ===
After Adolf Hitler came to power in 1933, Ernst joined his son (who had already entered in 1931) in the Nazi Party with the membership number of 3726902.

=== Retirement ===
After the Second World War, Ernst retired to private life. His wife, who suffered from various illnesses, died in 1942. Ernst was dedicated to church and nursing activities and was a member of the German Evangelical Church Assembly (the Kirchentag), Commander of the Württemberg-Badenschen Genossenschaft (Württemberg-Baden Cooperative), Governor of the Bailiwick of Brandenburg Order of St. John, Honorary President of the Württemberg State Association of the Red Cross as well as of the Evangelical People's League of Württemberg (Evangelischen Volksbund für Württemberg). On 11 December 1950, Ernst died at the age 87 at Langenburg, Baden-Württemberg, West Germany.

== Children ==
The children of Prince Ernst and Princess Alexandra of Hohelohe-Langenburg were descended from both Queen Victoria and Victoria's half-sister Feodora of Leiningen. They were:

- Prince Gottfried, 8th Prince of Hohenlohe-Langenburg (24 March 1897 – 11 May 1960); married Princess Margarita of Greece and Denmark, the eldest sister of the future Prince Philip, Duke of Edinburgh, and had issue.
- Princess Marie Melita of Hohenlohe-Langenburg (18 January 1899 – 8 November 1967); married Wilhelm Friedrich, Duke of Schleswig-Holstein and had issue.
- Princess Alexandra Beatrice Leopoldine of Hohenlohe-Langenburg (2 April 1901 – 26 October 1963)
- Princess Irma Helene of Hohenlohe-Langenburg (4 July 1902 – 8 March 1986)
- Prince Alfred Christian of Hohenlohe-Langenburg (16 April 1911 – 18 April 1911)

== Honours and awards ==
- Grand Duchy of Baden:
  - House Order of Fidelity (1904)
  - Friedrich-Luise Medal
- Kingdom of Bavaria: Order of Saint Hubert
- Principality of Lippe: House Order of the Honor Cross, 1st Class with Crown
- Grand Duchy of Mecklenburg-Schwerin: Military Merit Cross, 2nd Class
- Kingdom of Prussia:
  - Order of the Red Eagle, Grand Cross
  - Order of the Red Eagle, 1st Class with Diamonds
  - Royal House Order of Hohenzollern, Knight's Cross
  - Order of Saint John (Bailiwick of Brandenburg), Commander's Cross
  - Iron Cross 1st Class
- Principality of Reuß jüngere Linie: Princely Reuss Honor Cross, 1st Class
- Kingdom of Saxony: Albert Order, Grand Cross with Golden Star (1900)
- Grand Duchy of Saxe-Weimar-Eisenach: Order of the White Falcon, Grand Cross
- (Saxe-Coburg and Gotha) (Duchy of Saxe-Altenburg) (Saxe-Meiningen) Saxon Duchies:
  - Ducal Saxe-Ernestine House Order, Grand Cross
  - Ducal Saxe-Ernestine House Order, Grand Cross with Swords (16 April 1916)
- Kingdom of Württemberg:
  - Order of the Württemberg Crown, Grand Cross (1901)
  - Friedrich Order, Grand Cross (1893)
- Principality of Bulgaria: Order of Saint Alexander, Grand Cross
- United Kingdom: Order of the Bath, Honorary Knight Grand Cross (Civil Division) (22 October 1897)
- Kingdom of Romania: Kingdom of Romania: Order of the Star of Romania, Grand Cross
- Russian Empire: Order of Saint Vladimir, 4th Class

== Ancestry ==
Ancestors of Ernst II, Prince of Hohenlohe-Langenburg

8. Karl Ludwig, 3rd Prince of Hohenlohe-Langenburg
4. Ernst I, 4th Prince of Hohenlohe-Langenburg
9. Countess Amalie Henriette of Solms-Baruth
2. Hermann, 6th Prince of Hohenlohe-Langenburg
10. Emich Carl, 2nd Prince of Leiningen
5. Princess Feodora of Leiningen
11. Princess Victoria of Saxe-Coburg-Saalfeld
1. Ernst II, 7th Prince of Hohenlohe-Langenburg
12. Charles Frederick, Grand Duke of Baden
6. Prince William of Baden
13. Louise Caroline of Hochberg
3. Princess Leopoldine of Baden
14. Duke Louis of Württemberg
7. Duchess Elisabeth Alexandrine of Württemberg
15. Princess Henriette of Nassau-Weilburg

== Bibliography ==
- Klee, Ernst (2007). Das Kulturlexikon zum Dritten Reich. Wer war was vor und nach 1945. Frankfurt am Main: Klee. ISBN 978-3-10-039326-5.
- Huberty; Giraud; Magdelaine (1994). Dynastic Germany. ISBN 978-2-90113-807-5.
- (in German) Frank Raberg, Biographisches Handbuch der württembergischen Landtagsabgeordneten 1815–1933 [Biographical Handbook of the Members of the Landtag of Württemberg, 1815–1833], in the Kommission für geschichtliche Landeskunde in Baden-Württemberg [Commission of the Historical Studies of the State of Baden-Württemberg], (Stuttgart: W[ilhelm]. Kohlhammer, 2001), ISBN 3-17-016604-2, p. 381.

Ernst II, 7th Prince of Hohenlohe-Langenburg House of Hohenlohe-Langenburg Cadet branch of the House of Hohenlohe Born: 13 September 1863 Died: 11 December 1950
German nobility
Preceded by Hermann	Prince of Hohenlohe-Langenburg; 9 March 1913 – 11 August 1919	Succeeded by German nobility titles abolished
Titles in pretence
Loss of title	— TITULAR — Prince of Hohenlohe-Langenburg; 11 August 1919 – 11 December 1950; Reason for succession failure: German nobility titles abolished	Succeeded by Gottfried
