= Prince of Saxe-Coburg and Gotha =

List of princes of Saxe-Coburg and Gotha

This is a list of princes of Saxe-Coburg and Gotha from the accession of Ernest I to the throne of the Duchy of Saxe-Coburg and Gotha in 1826. Individuals holding the title of prince will usually also be styled "His Highness" (HH). The wife of a Saxon prince will usually take the title and style of her husband.

== Styling of princes ==
The title Prince of Saxe-Coburg and Gotha and Duke of Saxony and the use of the style "Highness" has generally been used by to the following persons:

=== Ducal line ===
- When Prince Albert married Queen Victoria their children were styled HRH, but Queen Victoria issued two letters patent, first in 1864 which stated that her male-line Grandchildren will be styled HRH and second 1898 which stated that children of the eldest son of the Prince of Wales will be styled HRH.

=== Koháry line ===
- When Prince Ferdinand August married Queen Maria II of Portugal and became King Ferdinand II of Portugal jure uxoris, he founded the House of Braganza-Saxe-Coburg and Gotha and their descents were to styled HRH.
- When Prince Ferdinand Maximilian became Tsar Ferdinand I of Bulgaria in 1908, his descents were to be styled HRH.

=== Belgian line ===
- When Prince Leopold became King Leopold I of the Belgians in 1831, his descents were to be styled HRH.

== List of Saxon princes since 1826 ==
Prince of Saxe-Coburg and Gotha by the sovereign
Prince of Saxe-Coburg and Gotha from birth
(†) - In Letters Patent dated 20 November 1917, King George V restricted the title of Prince to the children of the sovereign, the children of the sovereign's sons, and the eldest living son of the eldest son of the Prince of Wales.
(‡) - By an Order in Council dated 28 March 1919, as authorized by the Titles Deprivation Act 1917, King George V suspended the British peerage titles, princely dignities and honours of those who had sided with Germany in World War I.
(‡‡) - Had morganatic marriage/morganatic children.
- Title in the Duchy of Saxe-Coburg and Gotha
- Title in the Kingdom of Belgium
- Title in the Empire of Brazil
(Tsardom of Bulgaria (1908–1946)) - Title in the Kingdom of Bulgaria
- Title in the Kingdom of Portugal
- Title in the United Kingdom

List of princes of Saxe-Coburg and Gotha
Name	Born	Died	Royal lineage	Notes
First generation
(Saxe-Coburg and Gotha) Ernest I	1784	1844	1st son of Francis I	Duke of Saxe-Coburg and Gotha 1826–1844
(Saxe-Coburg and Gotha) Ferdinand	1785	1851	2nd son of Francis I	Title held from brother's ascension to death.
(Saxe-Coburg and Gotha) Leopold (Belgium) King Leopold I	1790	1865	3rd son of Francis I	Title held from brother's ascension to death. King of the Belgians 1831–1865
Second generation
(Saxe-Coburg and Gotha) Ernest II	1818	1893	1st son of Ernest I	Title held from father's ascension to own ascension in 1844. Duke of Saxe-Coburg and Gotha 1844–1893
(Saxe-Coburg and Gotha) Albert (United Kingdom) The Prince Consort	1819	1861	2nd son of Ernest I	Title held from father's ascension until his death. Consort of the United Kingdom 1840–1861
(Saxe-Coburg and Gotha) Ferdinand (Kingdom of Portugal) King Ferdinand II	1816	1885	1st son of Ferdinand	Title held from father's ascension until his death. King of Portugal 1837–1853
(Saxe-Coburg and Gotha) August	1818	1881	2nd son of Ferdinand	Title held from father's ascension until his death.
(Saxe-Coburg and Gotha) Leopold	1824	1884	3rd son of Ferdinand	Title held from father's ascension until his death. (‡‡)
(Saxe-Coburg and Gotha) Louis Philippe (Belgium) The Crown Prince	1833	1834	1st son of Leopold I	Born a Prince of Belgium.
(Saxe-Coburg and Gotha) Leopold (Belgium) The Duke of Brabant later, King Leopold II	1835	1909	2nd son of Leopold I	Born a Prince of Belgium. King of the Belgians 1865–1909
(Saxe-Coburg and Gotha) Philippe (Belgium) The Count of Flanders	1837	1905	3rd son of Leopold I	Born a Prince of Belgium.
Third generation
(Saxe-Coburg and Gotha) Albert Edward (United Kingdom) The Prince of Wales later, King Edward VII	1841	1910	1st son of Albert	Born a Prince of the United Kingdom. King of the United Kingdom 1901–1910
(Saxe-Coburg and Gotha) Alfred I (United Kingdom) The Duke of Edinburgh	1844	1900	2nd son of Albert	Born a Prince of the United Kingdom. Duke of Saxe-Coburg and Gotha 1893–1900
(Saxe-Coburg and Gotha) Arthur (United Kingdom) The Duke of Connaught and Strathearn	1850	1942	3rd son of Albert	Born a Prince of the United Kingdom.
(Saxe-Coburg and Gotha) Leopold (United Kingdom) The Duke of Albany	1853	1884	4th son of Albert	Born a Prince of the United Kingdom.
(Saxe-Coburg and Gotha) Peter (Kingdom of Portugal) The Prince Royal later, King Pedro V	1837	1861	1st son of Ferdinand II	Born a Prince of Portugal. King of Portugal 1853–1861
(Saxe-Coburg and Gotha) Louis (Kingdom of Portugal) The Duke of Porto and Viseu later, King Luís I	1838	1889	2nd son of Ferdinand II	Born a Prince of Portugal. King of Portugal 1861–1889
(Saxe-Coburg and Gotha) John (Kingdom of Portugal) The Duke of Beja	1842	1861	3rd son of Ferdinand II	Born a Prince of Portugal.
(Saxe-Coburg and Gotha) Ferdinand (Kingdom of Portugal) Fernando	1846	1861	4th son of Ferdinand II	Born a Prince of Portugal.
(Saxe-Coburg and Gotha) Augustus (Kingdom of Portugal) The Duke of Coimbra	1847	1889	5th son of Ferdinand II	Born a Prince of Portugal.
(Saxe-Coburg and Gotha) Leopold (Kingdom of Portugal) Leopoldo	1849		6th son of Ferdinand II	Born a Prince of Portugal.
(Saxe-Coburg and Gotha) Eugene (Kingdom of Portugal) Eugénio	1816		7th son of Ferdinand II	Born a Prince of Portugal.
(Saxe-Coburg and Gotha) Philipp	1844	1921	1st son of August	
(Saxe-Coburg and Gotha) Ludwig August	1845	1909	2nd son of August	
(Saxe-Coburg and Gotha) Ferdinand (Tsardom of Bulgaria (1908–1946)) Tsar Ferdinand I	1861	1948	3rd son of August	Tsar of Bulgaria 1908–1918
(Saxe-Coburg and Gotha) Leopold (Belgium) The Duke of Brabant	1859	1869	Only son of Leopold II	Born a Prince of Belgium.
(Saxe-Coburg and Gotha) Baudouin (Belgium) Baudouin	1869	1891	1st son of Philippe	Born a Prince of Belgium.
(Saxe-Coburg and Gotha) Albert (Belgium) Albert later, King Albert I	1875	1934	2nd son of Philippe	Born a Prince of Belgium. King of the Belgians 1909–1934
Fourth generation
(Saxe-Coburg and Gotha) Albert Victor (United Kingdom) The 1st Duke of Clarence and Avondale	1864	1892	1st son of Edward VII	Born a Prince of the United Kingdom.
(Saxe-Coburg and Gotha) George (United Kingdom) The Prince of Wales later, King George V	1865	1936	2nd son of Edward VII	Born a Prince of the United Kingdom. King of the United Kingdom 1910–1936
(Saxe-Coburg and Gotha) Alexander John (United Kingdom) Alexander John	1871		3rd son of Edward VII	Born a Prince of the United Kingdom.
(Saxe-Coburg and Gotha) Alfred (United Kingdom) Alfred	1874	1899	Only son of Alfred I	Born a Prince of the United Kingdom.
(Saxe-Coburg and Gotha) Arthur (United Kingdom) Arthur	1883	1938	Only son of Arthur	Born a Prince of the United Kingdom.
(Saxe-Coburg and Gotha) Charles Edward I (United Kingdom) The Duke of Albany	1884	1954	Only son of Leopold	Born a Prince of the United Kingdom. Duke of Saxe-Coburg and Gotha 1900–1918 (‡)
(Saxe-Coburg and Gotha) Charles (Kingdom of Portugal) The Prince Royal later, King Carlos I	1863	1908	1st son of Luís I	Born a Prince of Portugal. King of Portugal 1889–1908
(Saxe-Coburg and Gotha) Afonso (Kingdom of Portugal) The Duke of Porto	1865	1920	2nd son of Luís I	Born a Prince of Portugal.
(Saxe-Coburg and Gotha) Leopold Clement	1878	1916	Only son of Philipp	
(Saxe-Coburg and Gotha) Peter (Empire of Brazil) Dom Pedro Augusto	1866	1934	1st son of Ludwig August	
(Saxe-Coburg and Gotha) August Leopold (Empire of Brazil) Dom Augusto Leopoldo	1867	1922	2nd son of Ludwig August	
(Saxe-Coburg and Gotha) Joseph Ferdinand (Empire of Brazil) Dom José Fernando	1869	1888	3rd son of Ludwig August	
(Saxe-Coburg and Gotha) Ludwig Gaston (Empire of Brazil) Dom Luís Gastão	1870	1942	4th son of Ludwig August	
(Saxe-Coburg and Gotha) Boris (Tsardom of Bulgaria (1908–1946)) The Prince of Tarnovo later, Tsar Boris III	1894	1943	1st son of Ferdinand I	Born a Prince of Bulgaria. Tsar of Bulgaria 1918–1943
(Saxe-Coburg and Gotha) Kiril (Tsardom of Bulgaria (1908–1946)) The Prince of Preslav	1895	1945	2nd son of Ferdinand I	Born a Prince of Bulgaria.
(Saxe-Coburg and Gotha) Leopold (Belgium) The Duke of Brabant later, King Leopold III	1901	1983	1st son of Albert I	Born a Prince of Belgium. King of the Belgians 1934–1951
(Saxe-Coburg and Gotha) Charles (Belgium) The Count of Flanders	1903	1983	2nd son of Albert I	Born a Prince of Belgium.
Fifth generation
(Saxe-Coburg and Gotha) Edward (United Kingdom) The Prince of Wales later, King Edward VIII	1894	1972	1st son of George V	Born a Prince of the United Kingdom. King of the United Kingdom 1936
(Saxe-Coburg and Gotha) Albert (United Kingdom) The Duke of York later, King George VI	1895	1952	2nd son of George V	Born a Prince of the United Kingdom. King of the United Kingdom 1936–1952
(Saxe-Coburg and Gotha) Henry (United Kingdom) The Duke of Gloucester	1900	1974	3rd son of George V	Born a Prince of the United Kingdom.
(Saxe-Coburg and Gotha) George (United Kingdom) The Duke of Kent	1902	1942	4th son of George V	Born a Prince of the United Kingdom.
(Saxe-Coburg and Gotha) John (United Kingdom) John	1905	1919	5th son of George V	Born a Prince of the United Kingdom.
(Saxe-Coburg and Gotha) Alastair (United Kingdom) The Duke of Connaught and Strathearn	1914	1943	Only son of Arthur	Born a Prince of the United Kingdom.
(Saxe-Coburg and Gotha) Johann Leopold (United Kingdom) Johann Leopold	1906	1972	1st son of Charles Edward I	Born a Prince of the United Kingdom. (‡‡)
(Saxe-Coburg and Gotha) Hubertus (United Kingdom) Hubertus	1909	1943	2nd son of Charles Edward I	Born a Prince of the United Kingdom.
(Saxe-Coburg and Gotha) Friedrich Josias	1918	1998	3rd son of Charles Edward I	
(Saxe-Coburg and Gotha) Louis Philip (Kingdom of Portugal) The Prince Royal	1887	1908	1st son of Carlos I	Born a Prince of Portugal.
(Saxe-Coburg and Gotha) Manuel (Kingdom of Portugal) The Duke of Beja later, King Manuel II	1889	1932	2nd son of Carlos I	Born a Prince of Portugal. King of Portugal 1908–1910
(Saxe-Coburg and Gotha) August Clemens	1895	1908	1st son of August Leopold	
(Saxe-Coburg and Gotha) Rainer	1900	1945	2nd son of August Leopold	
(Saxe-Coburg and Gotha) Philipp	1901	1985	3rd son of August Leopold	(‡‡)
(Saxe-Coburg and Gotha) Ernst	1907	1978	4th son of August Leopold	(‡‡)
(Saxe-Coburg and Gotha) Antonius	1901	1970	Only son of Ludwig Gaston	
(Saxe-Coburg and Gotha) Simeon (Tsardom of Bulgaria (1908–1946)) The Prince of Tarnovo later, Tsar Simeon II	1936		Only son of Boris III	Born a Prince of Bulgaria. Tsar of Bulgaria 1943–1946
(Saxe-Coburg and Gotha) Baudouin (Belgium) The Duke of Brabant later, King Baudouin I	1930	1993	1st son of Leopold III	Born a Prince of Belgium. King of the Belgians 1951–1993
(Saxe-Coburg and Gotha) Albert (Belgium) The Prince of Liège later, King Albert II	1934		2nd son of Leopold III	Born a Prince of Belgium. King of the Belgians 1993–2013
(Saxe-Coburg and Gotha) Alexander (Belgium) Alexander	1942	2009	3rd son of Leopold III	Born a Prince of Belgium.
Sixth generation
(Saxe-Coburg and Gotha) Andreas	1943	2025	1st son of Friedrich Josias	
(Saxe-Coburg and Gotha) Adrian	1955	2011	2nd son of Friedrich Josias	(‡‡)
(Saxe-Coburg and Gotha) Johannes Heinrich	1931	2010	Only son of Rainer	
(Saxe-Coburg and Gotha) Kardam (Tsardom of Bulgaria (1908–1946)) The Prince of Tarnovo	1962	2015	1st son of Simeon II	Born a Prince of Bulgaria.
(Saxe-Coburg and Gotha) Kyril (Tsardom of Bulgaria (1908–1946)) The Prince of Preslav	1964		2nd son of Simeon II	Born a Prince of Bulgaria.
(Saxe-Coburg and Gotha) Kubrat (Tsardom of Bulgaria (1908–1946)) The Prince of Panagyurishte	1965		3rd son of Simeon II	Born a Prince of Bulgaria.
(Saxe-Coburg and Gotha) Konstantin-Assen (Tsardom of Bulgaria (1908–1946)) The Prince of Vidin	1967		4th son of Simeon II	Born a Prince of Bulgaria.
(Saxe-Coburg and Gotha) Philippe (Belgium) The Duke of Brabant later, King Philippe I	1960		1st son of Albert II	Born a Prince of Belgium. King of the Belgians 2013–
(Saxe-Coburg and Gotha) Laurent (Belgium) Laurent	1963		2nd son of Albert II	Born a Prince of Belgium.
Seventh generation
(Saxe-Coburg and Gotha) Hubertus	1975		1st son of Andreas	
(Saxe-Coburg and Gotha) Alexander	1977		2nd son of Andreas	
(Saxe-Coburg and Gotha) Johannes	1969	1987	Only son of Johannes Heinrich	
(Saxe-Coburg and Gotha) Boris (Tsardom of Bulgaria (1908–1946)) The Prince of Tarnovo	1997		1st son of Kardam	Born a Prince of Bulgaria
(Saxe-Coburg and Gotha) Beltran (Tsardom of Bulgaria (1908–1946)) Beltran	1999		2nd son of Kardam	Born a Prince of Bulgaria
(Saxe-Coburg and Gotha) Tassilo (Tsardom of Bulgaria (1908–1946)) Tassilo	2002		Only son of Kyril	Born a Prince of Bulgaria
(Saxe-Coburg and Gotha) Mirko (Tsardom of Bulgaria (1908–1946)) Mirko	1995		1st son of Kubrat	Born a Prince of Bulgaria
(Saxe-Coburg and Gotha) Lukás (Tsardom of Bulgaria (1908–1946)) Lukás	1997		2nd son of Kubrat	Born a Prince of Bulgaria
(Saxe-Coburg and Gotha) Tirso (Tsardom of Bulgaria (1908–1946)) Tirso	2002		3rd son of Kubrat	Born a Prince of Bulgaria
(Saxe-Coburg and Gotha) Umberto (Tsardom of Bulgaria (1908–1946)) Umberto	1999		Only son of Konstantin-Assen	Born a Prince of Bulgaria
(Saxe-Coburg and Gotha) Gabriel (Belgium) Gabriel	2003		1st son of Philippe	Born a Prince of Belgium.
(Saxe-Coburg and Gotha) Emmanuel (Belgium) Emmanuel	2005		2nd son of Philippe	Born a Prince of Belgium.
(Saxe-Coburg and Gotha) Clément (Belgium) Clément	2000		1st son of Laurent	Prince of Belgium 2026–
(Saxe-Coburg and Gotha) Nicolas (Belgium) Nicolas	2005		2st son of Laurent	Born a Prince of Belgium.
(Saxe-Coburg and Gotha) Aymeric (Belgium) Aymeric	2005		3rd son of Laurent	Born a Prince of Belgium.
Eighth generation
(Saxe-Coburg and Gotha) Prince Philipp	2015		Only son of Hubertus	
