= Princess Sibylla of Saxe-Coburg and Gotha =

Member of the Swedish royal family (1908–1972)

Princess Sibylla
- Duchess of Västerbotten
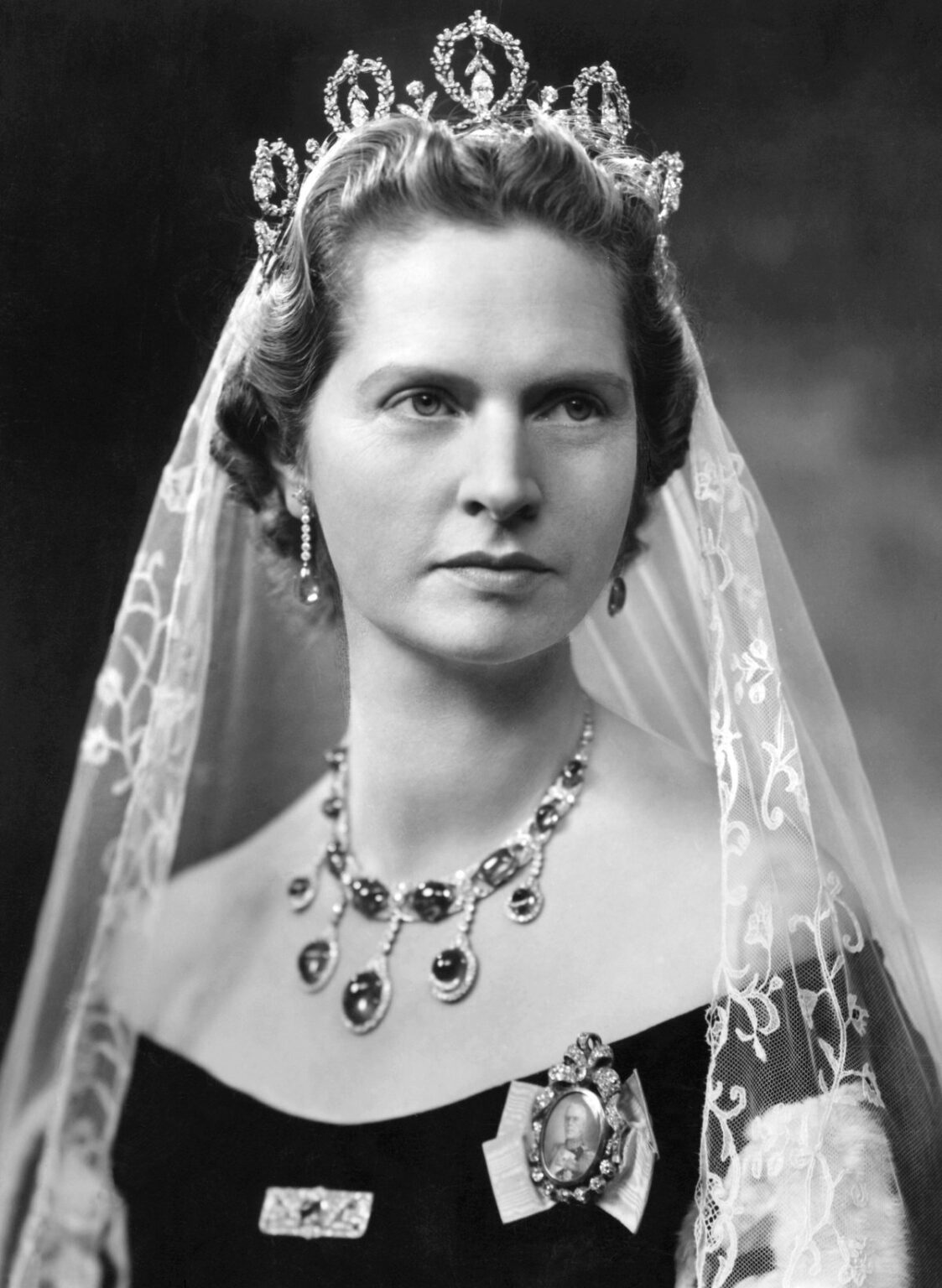
- Sibylla in 1947
- Born: 18 January 1908; Gotha, Saxe-Coburg and Gotha, German Empire
- Died: 28 November 1972 (aged 64); Stockholm, Sweden
- Burial: 7 December 1972; Royal Cemetery, Solna, Sweden
- Spouse: Prince Gustaf Adolf, Duke of Västerbotten (m. 1932; died 1947)
- Issue: Princess Margaretha; Princess Birgitta; Princess Désirée; Princess Christina; Carl XVI Gustaf
Names
- Sibylle Calma Marie Alice Bathildis Feodora
- House: Saxe-Coburg and Gotha
- Father: Charles Edward, Duke of Saxe-Coburg and Gotha
- Mother: Princess Victoria Adelaide of Schleswig-Holstein

Princess Sibylla of Saxe-Coburg and Gotha (Sibylle Calma Marie Alice Bathildis Feodora; 18 January 1908 – 28 November 1972) was a member of the Swedish royal family and the mother of the current king of Sweden, Carl XVI Gustaf.

Born into the House of Saxe-Coburg and Gotha, Sibylla was the daughter of Charles Edward, the last duke of Saxe-Coburg and Gotha. She became a Swedish princess when she married Prince Gustaf Adolf, Duke of Västerbotten in 1932. She thus had the prospect of one day becoming queen, but the prince was killed in an airplane crash in 1947 and did not live to ascend the Swedish throne. Her son became king the year after her death.

== Early life ==
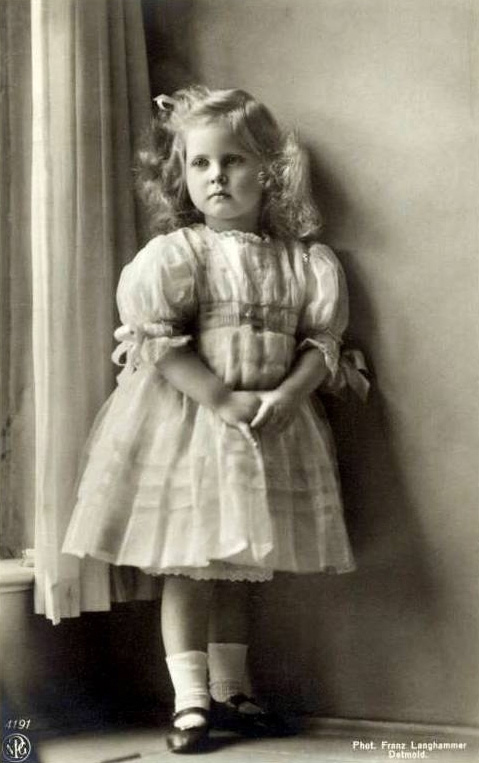
Princess Sibylla of Saxe-Coburg and Gotha at the age of six, in 1914

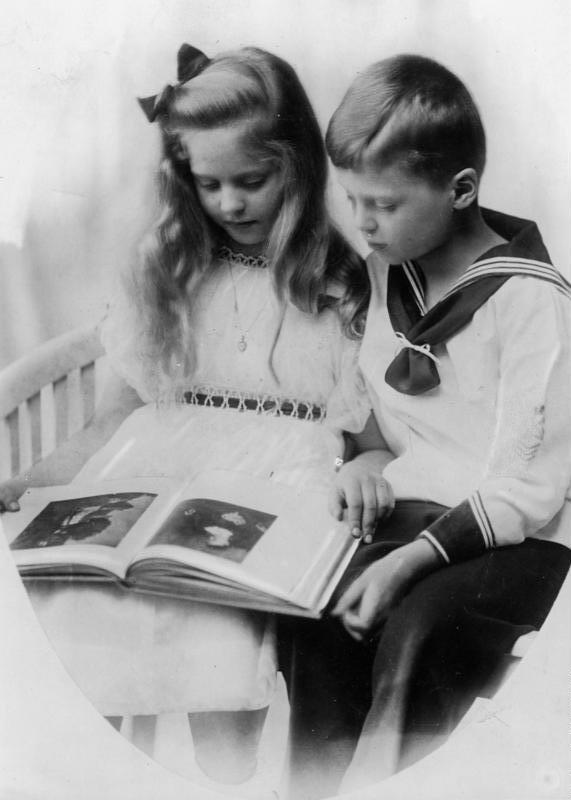
Sibylla and brother Hubertus in 1917

Sibylla was born on 18 January 1908 at Friedenstein Palace in the city of Gotha, one of the two capitals in the Duchy of Saxe-Coburg and Gotha in central Germany. She was the elder daughter and second child of Charles Edward, Duke of Saxe-Coburg and Gotha, and Princess Victoria Adelaide of Schleswig-Holstein. Her father was a posthumous son of Prince Leopold, Duke of Albany, the youngest son of Queen Victoria of the United Kingdom and Prince Albert of Saxe-Coburg and Gotha. Prince Charles Edward had, at the urging of his grandmother, inherited the position of duke after his uncle in 1900. The same year he had married Princess Victoria Adelaide, who was a daughter of Friedrich Ferdinand, Duke of Schleswig-Holstein and Princess Karoline Mathilde of Schleswig-Holstein-Sonderburg-Augustenburg, sister of the Empress Augusta Victoria.

Like the other princes of the German Empire, her father was forced to abdicate in November 1918, just before the end of World War I, when the German monarchies were abolished amidst the tumults of the German revolution of 1918–1919. This also affected Princess Sibylla's position. In 1919, her father was deprived of his British peerages, as a consequence of the Titles Deprivation Act 1917, which authorized enemies of the United Kingdom during the First World War to be deprived of their British peerages and royal titles. He and his children also lost their entitlement to the titles of Prince and Princess of the United Kingdom and the styles of Royal Highness and Highness. (Note: As a male-line grandson of the British Sovereign, Duke Charles Edward was a Prince of the United Kingdom with the qualification of Royal Highness, in accordance with Queen Victoria's Letters Patent of 30 January 1864 and of 27 May 1898. Under settled practice dating to 1714, his children, as legitimate male-line great-grandchildren of the British Sovereign, were Princes and Princesses of the United Kingdom with the qualification of Highness. However, their right to use these British titles and styles ceased with George V's Letters Patent of 30 November 1917.)

Princess Sibylla grew up in Coburg with her siblings Hereditary Prince Johann Leopold, Prince Hubertus, Princess Caroline-Mathilde and Prince Friedrich Josias. The children received, as was common in aristocratic circles at the time, their initial schooling by private tutors and governesses. Later, Princess Sibylla attended the Gymnasium Alexandrinum in Coburg and wanting to become an interior designer, studied briefly at the Kunstgewerbeschule art school in Weimar.

== Marriage and family ==
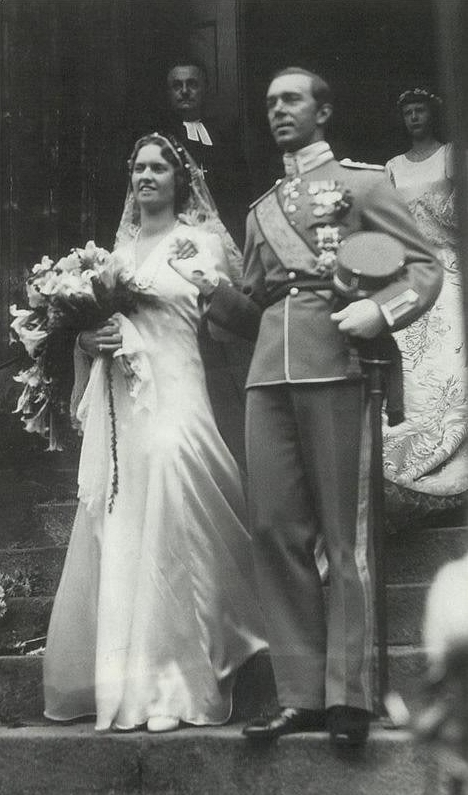
The bride and groom at their wedding on 20 October 1932 at the St. Moriz Church, Coburg

In November 1931, Sibylla was in London to attend the wedding of her paternal first cousin Lady May Cambridge as a bridesmaid. One of the other bridesmaids was her second cousin Princess Ingrid of Sweden, who introduced Sibylla to her brother, Prince Gustaf Adolf, Duke of Västerbotten. Their engagement was announced at Callenberg Castle in Coburg 16 June 1932. Prince Gustaf Adolf was the eldest son of Crown Prince Gustav Adolf of Sweden (later King Gustaf VI Adolf) and Princess Margaret of Connaught, a granddaughter of Queen Victoria. Sibylla and Gustaf Adolf were thus second cousins, as they were both great-grandchildren of Queen Victoria. Furthermore, Sibylla was a direct descendant of the 16th-century Swedish regent Sten Sture the Younger and his wife Christina Gyllenstierna (a great-granddaughter of King Charles VIII of Sweden), who led the Swedish resistance against Christian II of Denmark.

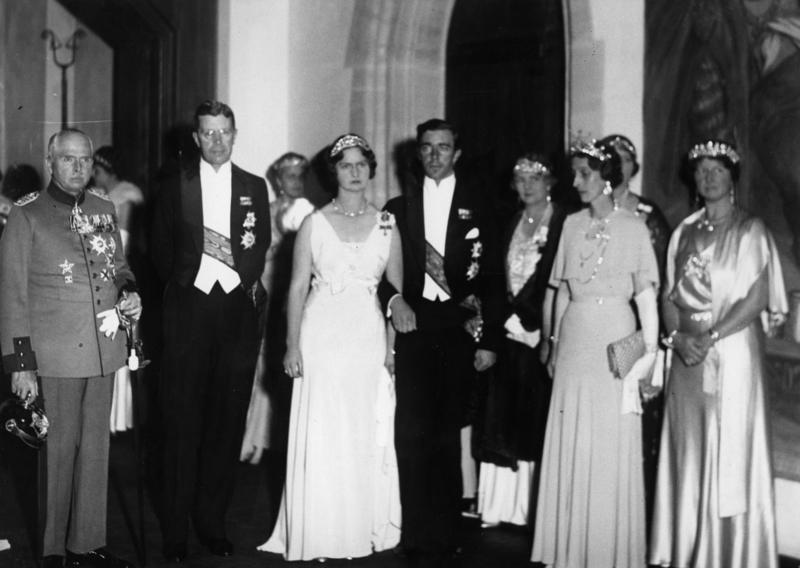
Civil wedding of Princess Sibylla and Prince Gustaf Adolf of Sweden in Coburg 19 October 1932. From left: her father Karl Eduard; father of the groom, Crown Prince Gustaf Adolf of Sweden; the bride and groom; Crown Princess Louise of Sweden; the mother of the bride, Duchess Victoria Adelheid.

The wedding took place in Coburg in October of the same year – known as the "Sweden Year", as in the same year the 300th-anniversary of the death of the great Swedish King Gustavus II Adolphus was marked. Although the dukedom had been abolished, the wedding was still celebrated in an official manner in Coburg, with, among other things, military honors and a public procession, as the German President Paul von Hindenburg had ordered that no honours should be spared. However, as the city of Coburg was already strongly dominated by the Nazi party at the time, (Note: In 1929, Coburg was the first German town in which the Nazi Party won the absolute majority of the popular vote during municipal elections. In 1932, Coburg was the first German town to make Adolf Hitler an honorary citizen.) the official celebrations there were Nazi influenced, which made a very bad impression in Sweden. On 19 October, Princess Sibylla married Prince Gustaf Adolf in a civil ceremony at the Veste Coburg, followed by a church wedding the following day after, at the St. Moriz Church. The couple spent their honeymoon in Italy before arriving in Stockholm on 25 November 1932.

The couple had five children:

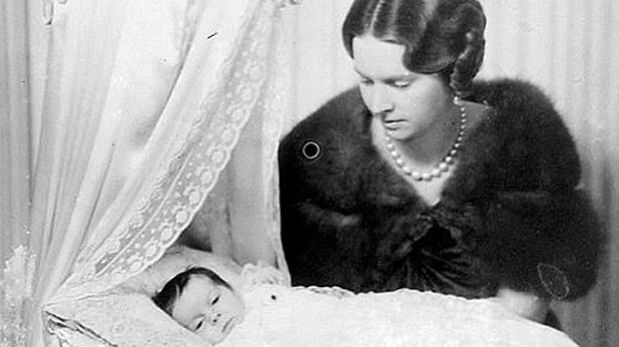
Princess Sibylla and her first born daughter Margaretha, 1934

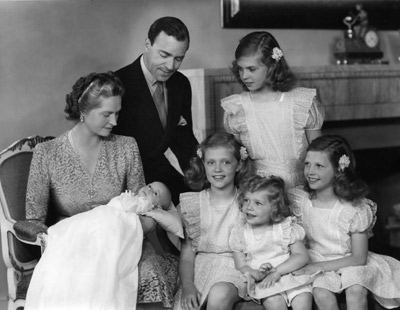
Sibylla with Prince Gustaf Adolf and all the children in 1946; current King of Sweden, Carl XVI Gustaf on her lap.
- Princess Margaretha, Mrs. Ambler (born 31 October 1934) married John Ambler on 30 June 1964. They had three children.
- Princess Birgitta of Sweden and Hohenzollern (19 January 1937 – 4 December 2024) married Prince Johann Georg of Hohenzollern on 25 May 1961. They had three children.
- Princess Désirée, Baroness Silfverschiöld (2 June 1938 – 21 January 2026) married Baron Niclas Silfverschiöld on 5 June 1964. They had three children.
- Princess Christina, Mrs. Magnuson (born 3 August 1943) married Tord Magnuson on 15 June 1974. They had three sons.
- King Carl XVI Gustaf of Sweden (born 30 April 1946) married Silvia Sommerlath on 19 June 1976. They had three children.

Her daughters have revealed that Sibylla suffered two miscarriages, first between the births of Margretha and Birgitta and since between the births of Désirée and Christina.

== Princess of Sweden ==
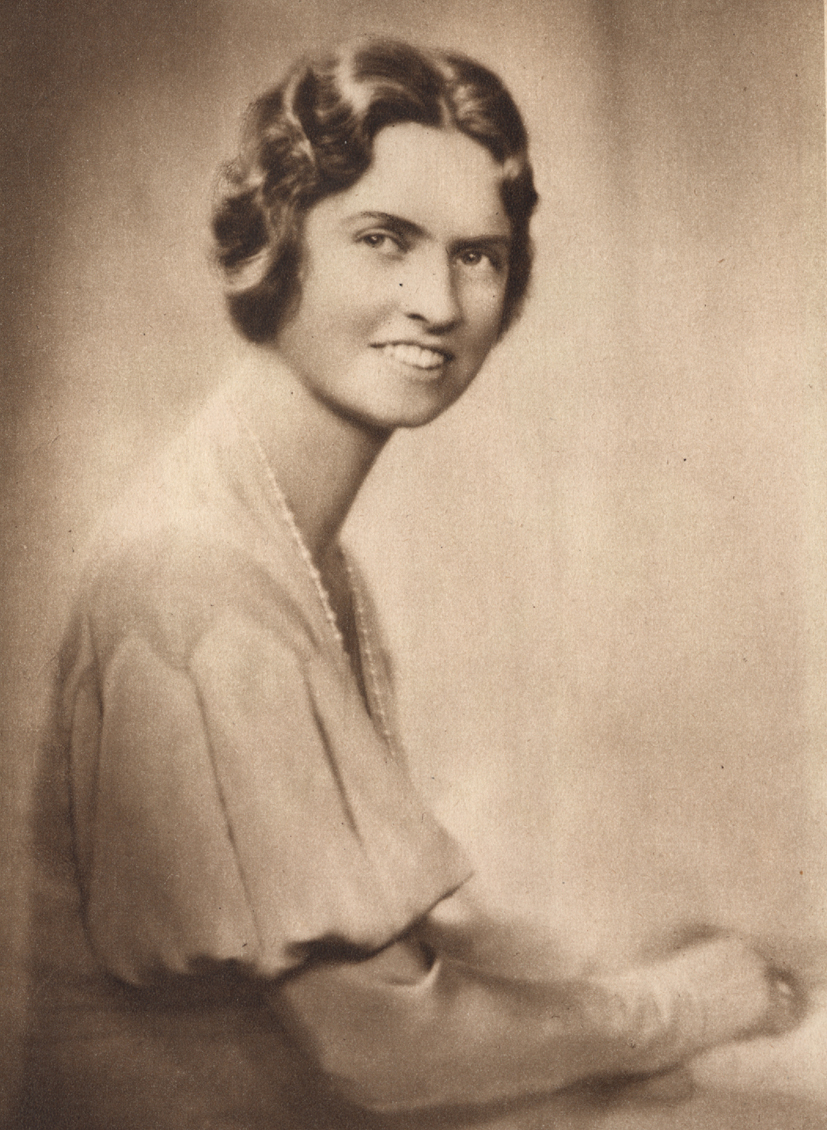
Princess Sibylla in 1932

Princess Sibylla at the Lundsberg Alumni Association dinner at the Strand Hotel, 1946

Arms of Princess Sibylla

Monogram of Princess Sibylla

The couple settled at Haga Palace, and their four daughters were to be commonly known during their childhood as the "Hagasessorna" (English: "The Haga Princesses"). Sibylla shared her husband's enthusiasm for sport and outdoor activities, and the couple owned a cottage in Ingarö and another one in Storlien.

During her lifetime, she was appointed chairman of various organisations such as Sällskapet Barnavård ("The Childcare Society") in 1948 and the honorary chairmanship of the Hörselfrämjandet ("The Hearing Society") in 1935; the Sveriges flickscoutråd ("The Swedish Girl Scouts") in 1939; Kvinnliga bilkåren ("The Women's Automobile Force") in 1939; the Stiftelsen Solstickan ("The Solstickan Society") in 1941; and the Stiftelsen Drottning Victorias Vilohem på Öland ("The Queen Victoria Resting Home in Öland") in 1951. In 1938, she founded the Prinsessan Sibyllas S:t Martin-stiftelse ("The Princess Sibylla Foundation of St Martin").

== Widowhood ==
Princess Sibylla and King Gustaf VI Adolf at the confirmation of Crown Prince Carl Gustaf

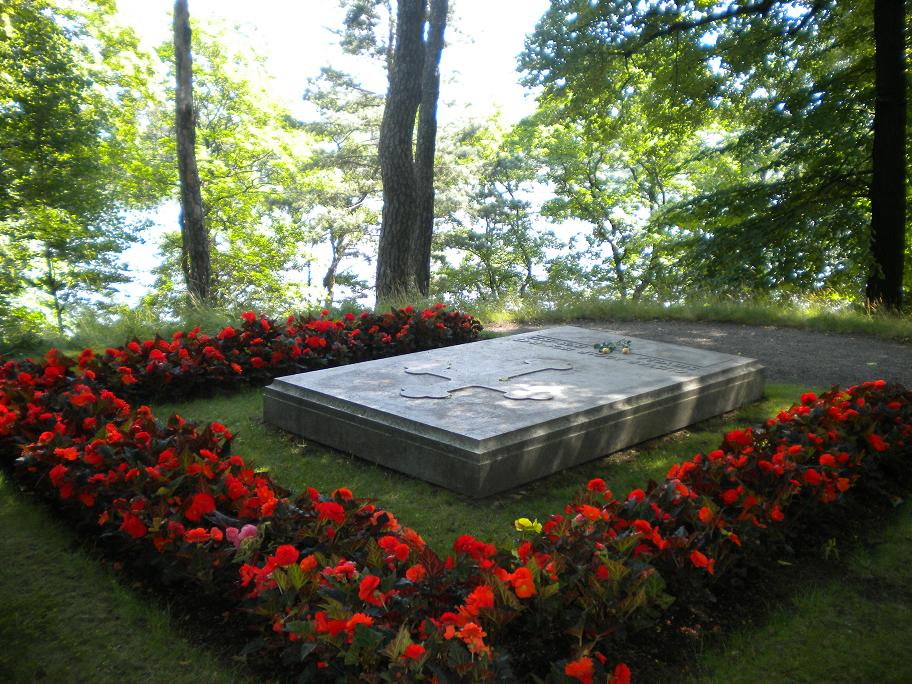
Grave of Sibylla and spouse Gustaf Adolf on Karlsborg Island (Kungliga begravningssplats) in Solna, Sweden

Sibylla became a widow on 26 January 1947 when Gustaf Adolf died in an airplane crash at the Copenhagen Kastrup Airport in Denmark. Their only son, Carl Gustaf, became second-in-line to the throne at the age of nine months and, later, Crown Prince at the age of four. In 1950, Sibylla moved from Haga to the Royal Palace of Stockholm. During the summers, she stayed at Solliden. During these years, she developed an interest in environmental issues.

After her stepmother-in-law, Queen Louise, died in 1965, Princess Sibylla became the highest ranking woman in the royal family. She took over her duties in support of her father-in-law, King Gustaf VI Adolf. During these years, she enjoyed somewhat more popularity, as she was more exposed, and as her humour and sense of self-irony became more known and appreciated. She continued with the so-called "Democratic ladies lunches" for career women initiated by Queen Louise in 1962 as a replacement for the court presentation.

Sibylla died, aged 64 of cancer, on 28 November 1972, in Stockholm less than a year before her son ascended to the throne.

== Ancestry ==
Ancestors of Princess Sibylla of Saxe-Coburg and Gotha

8. Prince Albert of Saxe-Coburg and Gotha
4. Prince Leopold, Duke of Albany
9. Victoria of the United Kingdom
2. Charles Edward, Duke of Saxe-Coburg and Gotha
10. George Victor, Prince of Waldeck and Pyrmont
5. Princess Helen of Waldeck and Pyrmont
11. Princess Helena of Nassau
1. Princess Sibylla of Saxe-Coburg and Gotha
12. Friedrich, Duke of Schleswig-Holstein-Sonderburg-Glücksburg
6. Friedrich Ferdinand, Duke of Schleswig-Holstein
13. Princess Adelheid of Schaumburg-Lippe
3. Princess Victoria Adelaide of Schleswig-Holstein
14. Frederick VIII, Duke of Schleswig-Holstein
7. Princess Karoline Mathilde of Schleswig-Holstein-Sonderburg-Augustenburg
15. Princess Adelheid of Hohenlohe-Langenburg
