= Princess Karoline Mathilde of Schleswig-Holstein-Sonderburg-Glücksburg =

- Countess Hans of Solms-Baruth
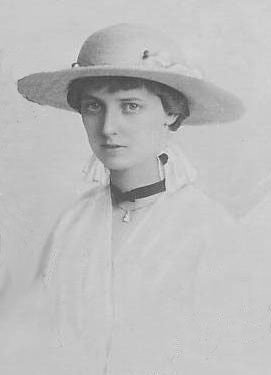
- Born: 11 May 1894; Grünholz, Province of Schleswig-Holstein, Kingdom of Prussia, German Empire
- Died: 28 January 1972 (aged 77); Salzburg, Salzburg, Austria
- Spouse: Count Hans of Solms-Baruth (m. 1920; died 1971)
- Issue: Viktoria-Luise, Hereditary Princess of Saxe-Coburg and Gotha; Count Friederich; Count Hubertus
Names
- Victoria-Irene Adelaide Augusta Alberta Feodora Caroline Mathilde; German: Viktoria-Irene Adelheid Auguste Alberta Feodora Karoline Mathilde
- House: Glücksburg
- Father: Friedrich Ferdinand, Duke of Schleswig-Holstein-Sonderburg-Glücksburg
- Mother: Princess Karoline Mathilde of Schleswig-Holstein-Sonderburg-Augustenburg

Princess Karoline Mathilde of Schleswig-Holstein-Sonderburg-Glücksburg (Viktoria-Irene Adelheid Auguste Alberta Feodora Karoline Mathilde of Schleswig-Holstein-Sonderburg-Glücksburg; 11 May 1894 – 28 January 1972) was a member of the House of Schleswig-Holstein-Sonderburg-Glücksburg and Princess of Schleswig-Holstein-Sonderburg-Glücksburg by birth and a member of the House of Solms Baruth and Countess of Solms Baruth through her marriage to Count Hans of Solms-Baruth.

== Early life ==
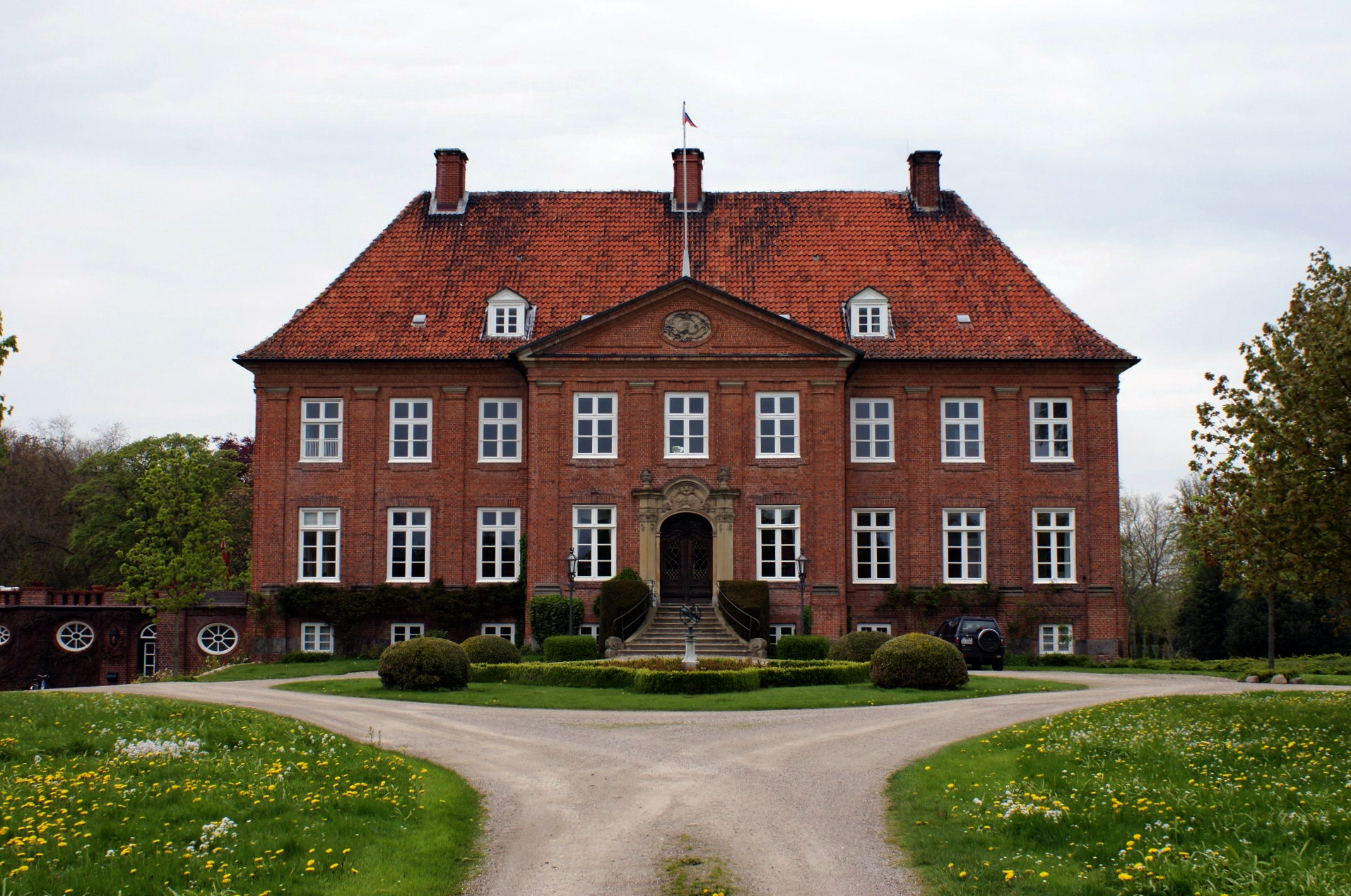
Princess Karoline Mathilde's birth place: Grünholz Manor, Schleswig-Holstein, residence of the Ducal pair, photographed in 2010.

Princess Karoline Mathilde was born on 11 May 1894 at Grünholz Manor, Schleswig-Holstein, Prussia, the sixth and youngest child and fifth and youngest daughter of Frederick Ferdinand, Duke of Schleswig-Holstein-Sonderbug-Glücksburg, and his wife Princess Karoline Mathilde of Schleswig-Holstein-Sonderburg-Augustenburg. Frederick Ferdinand was the eldest son of Friedrich, Duke of Schleswig-Holstein-Sonderburg-Glücksburg and a nephew of Christian IX of Denmark. Upon the death of his father in 1885, he had succeeded to the headship of the House of Schleswig-Holstein-Sonderburg-Glücksburg and the title of duke. Her eldest sister, Victoria Adelaide, was the consort of Charles Edward, Duke of Saxe-Coburg and Gotha.

== Marriage ==
She married Count Hans of Solms-Baruth (1893–1971) on 27 May 1920 at Glücksburg Castle. Count Hans was the third son of Friedrich II, Prince of Solms-Baruth (1853–1920) and his wife, Countess Luise of Hochberg-Pless (1863–1941), and a younger brother of Hereditary Prince Friedrich of Solms-Baruth, the husband of Karoline Mathilde's elder sister Adelaide.

Solms-Baruth was one of the many minor states of the Holy Roman Empire, located in Lower Lusatia. It had lost its independence in the German Mediatization of 1806.

Karoline Mathilde and Hans had three children:

- Countess Viktoria-Luise Frederica Caroline Mathilde von Solms-Baruth (13 March 1921 – 1 March 2003)
- Count Friedrich Hans von Solms-Baruth (3 March 1923 – 13 November 2006)
- Count Hubertus von Solms-Baruth (7 December 1934 – 22 October 1991)

== Later life ==
In 1942, her daughter Viktoria Luise married her first cousin Prince Friedrich Josias of Saxe-Coburg and Gotha, youngest son of her sister Victoria Adelaide, and later the pretender to the ducal throne of Saxe-Coburg and Gotha. Count Hans died on 9 October 1971 in Salzburg, Austria. Countess Karoline Mathilde died on 28 January 1972, also in Salzburg.

== Ancestry ==
Ancestors of Princess Karoline Mathilde of Schleswig-Holstein-Sonderburg-Glücksburg

8. Friedrich Wilhelm, Duke of Schleswig-Holstein-Sonderburg-Glücksburg
4. Friedrich, Duke of Schleswig-Holstein-Sonderburg-Glücksburg
9. Princess Louise Caroline of Hesse-Kassel
2. Friedrich Ferdinand, Duke of Schleswig-Holstein
10. George William, Prince of Schaumburg-Lippe
5. Princess Adelheid of Schaumburg-Lippe
11. Princess Ida of Waldeck and Pyrmont
1. Princess Karoline Mathilde of Schleswig-Holstein-Sonderburg-Glücksburg
12. Christian August II, Duke of Schleswig-Holstein-Sonderburg-Augustenburg
6. Frederick VIII, Duke of Schleswig-Holstein
13. Countess Louise Sophie Danneskiold-Samsøe
3. Princess Karoline Mathilde of Schleswig-Holstein-Sonderburg-Augustenburg
14. Ernst I, Prince of Hohenlohe-Langenburg
7. Princess Adelheid of Hohenlohe-Langenburg
15. Princess Feodora of Leiningen
