= Hubertus Prinz von Sachsen-Coburg und Gotha =

German lawyer (born 1975)

Head of the House of Saxe-Coburg and Gotha
- Tenure: 3 April 2025 – present
- Predecessor: Prince Andreas
- Heir apparent: Prince Philipp
- Born: 16 September 1975 (age 51); Hamburg, West Germany
- Spouse: Kelly Rondestvedt (m. 2009)
- Issue: 3
Names
- German: Hubertus Michael
- House: Saxe-Coburg and Gotha
- Father: Andreas, Prince of Saxe-Coburg and Gotha
- Mother: Carin Dabelstein
- Military career
- Allegiance: Germany
- Branch: Armoured Reconnaissance Battalion
- Service years: 1996–1997
- Rank: Second Lieutenant

Hubertus Michael Prinz von Sachsen-Coburg und Gotha, Herzog in Sachsen (born 16 September 1975) is a German lawyer and head of the former ducal House of Saxe-Coburg and Gotha since 2025, a distinction based on descent through approved marriages. It is however his second cousin Hubertus Prinz von Sachsen-Coburg und Gotha who would be entitled to petition for restoration of the title Duke of Albany which was separately held (until the Titles Deprivation Act 1917) and inherited by their great-grandfather Charles Edward, Duke of Saxe-Coburg and Gotha.

== Biography ==
Hubertus was born on 16 September 1975 in Hamburg, Germany, as the eldest son and middle child of Andreas, Prince of Saxe-Coburg and Gotha, and Carin Dabelstein. At the time of Hubertus's birth, his grandfather, Friedrich Josias, was the head of the House of Saxe-Coburg and Gotha, In 1995, Hubertus graduated from a public school in Coburg, then joined the Armoured Reconnaissance Battalion in Ebern. By December 1996, Hubertus was promoted to Officer Cadet and a Second Lieutenant by 1997, when he resigned to study law.

Hubertus studied law at the University of Würzburg from 1997 to 1999. During this time, Hubertus's father, Andreas, succeeded to head of the house when Friedrich Josias died on 23 January 1998. Hubertus switched universities in 1999 and began his attendance at the London School of Economics, where he studied for only one year. In 2000, Hubertus returned to Germany to study at LMU Munich until 2003.

Following attaining his university law degree, Hubertus worked for the Provincial Court of Appeals of Germany from April 2003 to June 2005, and then for a local law firm in Munich from September 2005 to September 2006. Before moving to New York City at the end of 2006, Hubertus had been a member of Shooting Club in Coburg as a licensed hunter. Upon moving to New York City, Hubertus began working as the New York lawyer of Deutsche Bank, specialising in wealth management.

After five years of living in New York, Hubertus moved back to Coburg with his wife. They temporarily lived in Munich while their apartment in Coburg was being renovated. Since January 2012, Hubertus has sat on the board of directors of their family foundation, the Stiftung der Herzog von Sachsen-Coburg und Gotha'schen Familie.

== Marriage and children ==
Hubertus married Kelly Rondestvedt in 2009. At a New York restaurant in 2007, Hubertus met Kelly Rondestvedt and they began dating. On a trip to Coburg, Hubertus proposed to her and they wed in a small civil ceremony on 21 May 2009 in Callenberg Castle with members of their immediate family present. Two days later, they married in a religious ceremony at the Lutheran Saint Moritz Church. The wedding was attended by over 400 guests and spectated by a crowd of around 3,000 people. Guests included King Carl XVI Gustaf and Queen Silvia of Sweden, King Simeon II and Margarita of Bulgaria, Princess Marie Louise of Bulgaria and Bronisław Chrobok, Prince Konstantin-Assen and Princess María of Vidin, Lord and Lady Nicholas Windsor, Princess Astrid of Belgium, and Prince Alexander and Princess Nadja of Schaumburg-Lippe. The couple are parents of three children.

== Honours ==
National

Sovereign Knight Grand Cross with Collar of the Royal Order of Saxe-Coburg and Gotha (21 May 2009)

Foreign

- Sweden: Recipient of the King Carl XVI Gustaf 70th Birthday Commemorative Medal (30/04/2016).

Hubertus Prinz von Sachsen-Coburg und Gotha House of Saxe-Coburg and Gotha Cadet branch of the House of Wettin Born: 16 September 1975
Titles in pretence
Preceded by Andreas	— TITULAR — Duke of Saxe-Coburg and Gotha; 3 April 2025 – present Reason for succession failure: Duchy abolished in 1918	Incumbent; Heir: Philipp
