= Prince Hubertus of Saxe-Coburg and Gotha (pilot) =

German prince (1909–1943)

Prince Hubertus
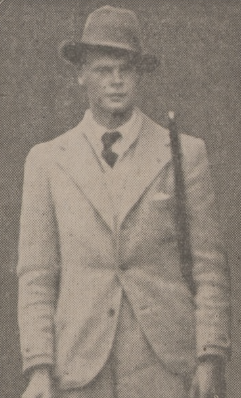
- Born: 24 August 1909; Reinhardsbrunn Castle, Saxe-Coburg and Gotha, German Empire
- Died: 26 November 1943 (aged 34); Mosty Wielkie, German-occupied Poland
Names
- Dietmar Hubertus Friedrich Wilhelm Philipp Prinz von Sachsen-Coburg und Gotha
- House: Saxe-Coburg and Gotha
- Father: Charles Edward, Duke of Saxe-Coburg and Gotha
- Mother: Princess Victoria Adelaide of Schleswig-Holstein
- Military service
- Allegiance: Nazi Germany
- Branch: Luftwaffe
- Service years: 1939–1943
- Rank: Oberleutnant

Prince Hubertus of Saxe-Coburg and Gotha (Dietmar Hubertus Friedrich Wilhelm Philipp; 24 August 1909 – 26 November 1943) was a German courier pilot and a member of the House of Saxe-Coburg-Gotha, which reigned over the eponymous duchy in the German Empire. Born a prince of Great Britain and Ireland as a great-grandson of Queen Victoria, Hubertus lost this title during the First World War. He became heir apparent to the headship of his house in 1932. Secretly homosexual, he never married. Hubertus joined the Nazi Party upon the outbreak of the Second World War despite his opposition to Adolf Hitler and Nazism. He served in the Luftwaffe on the Eastern Front until he was killed in action.

== Family ==
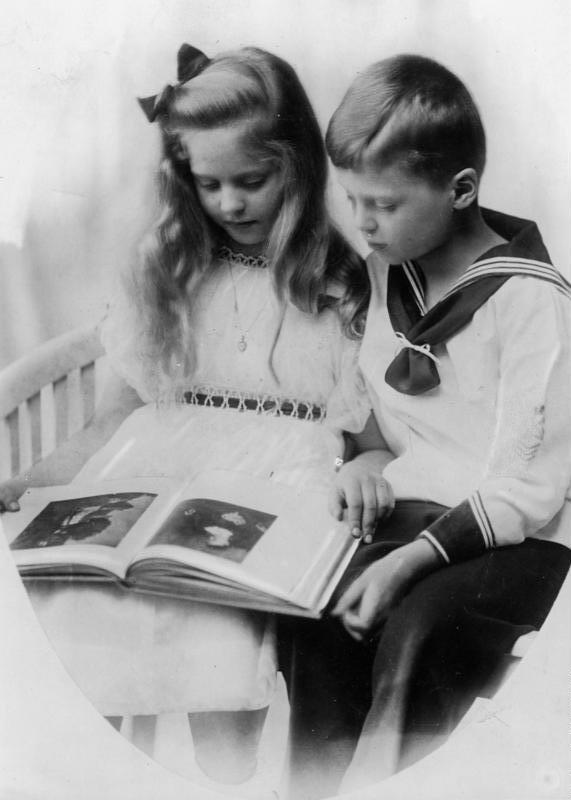
Prince Hubertus with his sister Sibylla in 1917

Prince Hubertus was born on 24 August 1909 at Reinhardsbrunn Castle, German Empire. A 72-gun salute took place at Friedenstein Palace 40 minutes after the Prince's birth. The third child and second son of Charles Edward, Duke of Saxe-Coburg-Gotha, and Princess Victoria Adelaide of Schleswig-Holstein-Sonderburg-Glücksburg, he was christened Dietmar Hubertus Friedrich Wilhelm Philipp on 21 September with his maternal grandfather, Friedrich Ferdinand, Duke of Schleswig-Holstein-Sonderburg-Glücksburg, serving as godfather. Besides ruling a state of the German Empire, Charles Edward was a British peer and a British prince as the grandson of Queen Victoria. Charles Edward lost his Coburg and Gotha throne during the German Revolution of 1918–19, and then was stripped of his British titles in 1919 for siding with Germany in the First World War.

Hubertus had an older brother, Hereditary Prince Johann Leopold, who was heir apparent to their father, and three more siblings: Princess Sibylla, Princess Caroline Mathilde, and Prince Friedrich Josias. Though Charles Edward was brought up as an Englishman and the family mainly spoke English at home, Hubertus spoke German fluently, as did his siblings. He was hindered by timidity but was nevertheless the favourite of the family. He was especially close to his sister Sibylla and remained her confidant in adulthood. The children lived in fear of their father, who ran his family "like a military unit".

== Youth ==
Little is known about the career of Prince Hubertus. He received a private education before enrolling at the Gymnasium Casimirianum in Coburg. He then studied law. According to Harald Sandner, biographer of Duke Charles Edward, it became evident during the studies that Prince Hubertus was homosexual, but his sexual orientation remained secret.

When his brother Hereditary Prince Johann Leopold renounced his succession rights in order to marry a commoner in 1932, Hubertus became the new heir apparent to the defunct throne of Saxe-Coburg and Gotha. The same year, Hubertus attended the wedding of his sister Sibylla and Prince Gustaf Adolf of Sweden, Duke of Västerbotten, staying close to the bride during the ceremony. Hubertus himself was not willing to marry.

== Second World War ==
The father of Prince Hubertus, Duke Charles Edward, was an ardent supporter of Adolf Hitler. The entire family enthusiastically welcomed the rise of German nationalism. Soon, however, Hubertus and his mother, Duchess Victoria Adelaide, grew to despise the rising Nazi Party. After witnessing the torture of Jews, Prince Hubertus was forbidden to discuss it at home. The Second World War broke out in September 1939, and all of Charles Edward's sons were enlisted in the German Army (Wehrmacht). Prince Hubertus formally became a member of the Nazi Party on 19 October 1939, but remained opposed to Hitler for the rest of his life. In 1940, Hitler issued the Prinzenerlass, a decree prohibiting members of Germany's formerly reigning families from actively serving in the Wehrmacht, fearing that this would increase the public's sympathy for the deposed dynasties and threaten his grip on power. Such was Charles Edward's loyalty to Hitler, however, that the decree did not apply to the Duke's sons. During the war it was even reported that Hitler considered making Hubertus his Gauleiter for the United Kingdom.

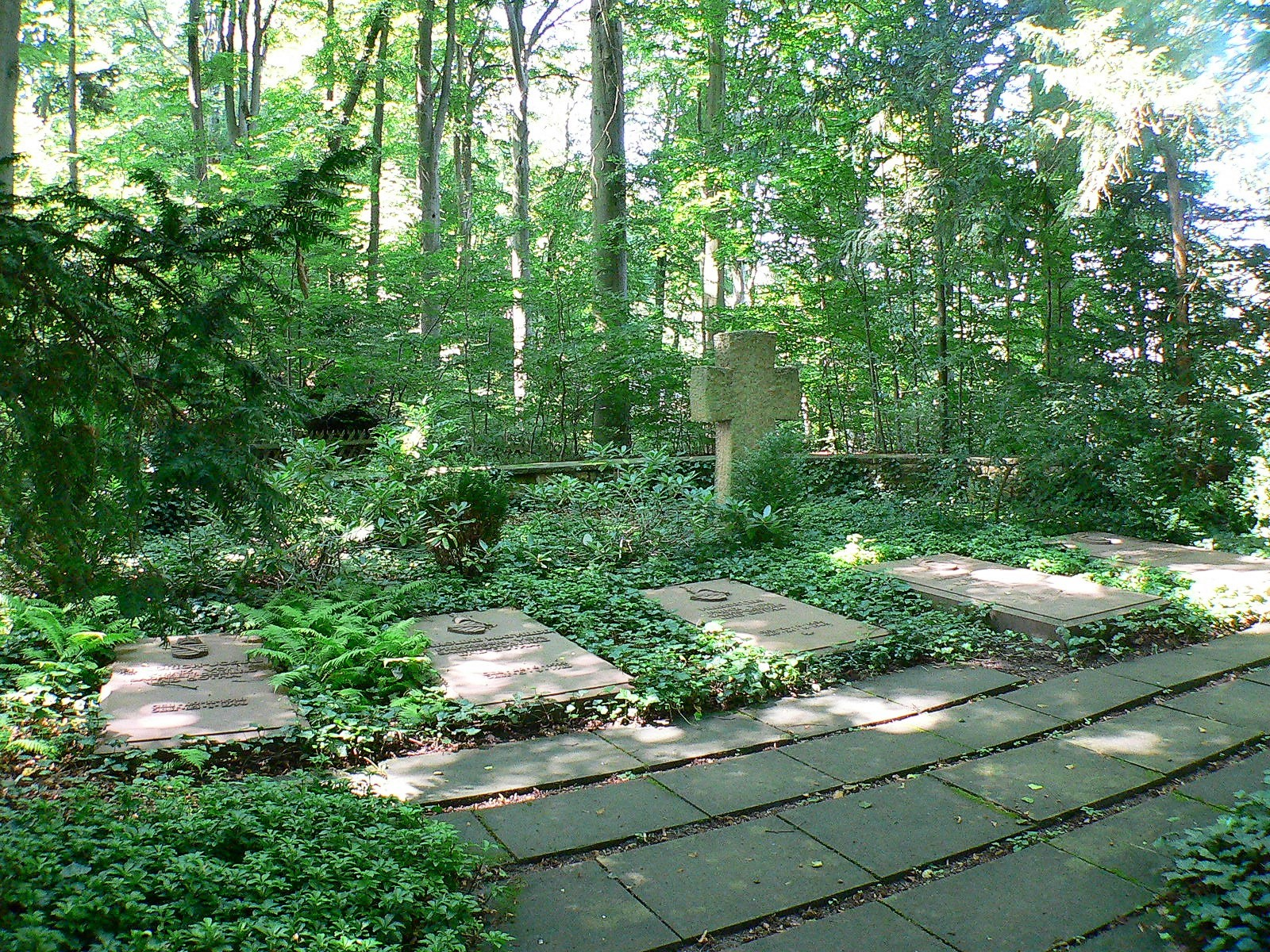
The graves of Hubertus and his siblings at Callenberg Castle

Prince Hubertus was an accomplished aviator. Serving in the Luftwaffe as a courier pilot in the Eastern Front, Hubertus obtained the rank of Oberleutnant (senior pilot). He was killed in action when his plane was shot down by the Soviet Air Forces on 26 November 1943 in Mosty, modern-day Ukraine. It was his last flight before he was to be relocated. News of his death spread on 3 December. Hubertus was buried the following day at the Coburg family cemetery at Callenberg Castle. The Duke and Duchess of Saxe-Coburg and Gotha announced the death of their son and heir in Gothaer Beobachter with a very short obituary on 11 December. The ducal couple's youngest son, Prince Friedrich Josias, became heir apparent in his stead.

Princess Sibylla was distraught at the death of her favourite brother. In 1946, she had a son, the long-awaited heir to the Swedish throne, and named him Carl Gustaf Folke Hubertus; he later became King Carl XVI Gustaf. When King Carl XVI Gustaf's grandson was christened Alexander Erik Hubertus Bertil, the choice of the name Hubertus was criticized by journalist Henrik Arnstad due to Prince Hubertus's membership of the Nazi Party. Arnstad was rebuked for his comments by political commentator Ivar Arpi.

== Titles and honours ==
Hubertus was styled as "His Highness Prince Hubertus of Saxe-Coburg and Gotha". Being a member of the House of Wettin, he was also a duke of Saxony. As a male-line great-grandson of a British monarch, Hubertus was a prince of Great Britain and Ireland until the use of the title was restricted to the children and grandchildren of a monarch by letters patent of 1917. He was a knight of the Swedish Royal Order of the Seraphim.
