= List of heirs to Saxe-Coburg and Gotha =

In the redistribution of land among the Ernestine duchies that followed the death of Frederick IV, the last duke of Saxe-Gotha-Altenburg, on 11 February 1825, the late duke's nephew-in-law, Duke Ernst III of Saxe-Coburg-Saalfeld, received Gotha, while he ceded Saalfeld to the Duke of Saxe-Meiningen. On 12 November 1826 he thus became Ernst I of Saxe-Coburg and Gotha. The duchies of Saxe-Coburg and Saxe-Gotha remained in personal union until 1852, when a political union was effected.

This article is a list of those men who were heir-apparent or heir-presumptive to Saxe-Coburg and Gotha from 1826 until the abolition of the monarchy on 14 November 1918.

== Heir to Ernest I, 1826–1844 ==
Person	Name	Status	Relation	Became Hereditary Prince	Reason	Ceased to be Hereditary Prince	Reason	Next in succession, relation to heir
	Hereditary Prince Ernest	Heir apparent	Eldest son	12 November 1826	Father acceded to throne	29 January 1844	Acceded to throne as Ernest II	Prince Albert, brother

== Heirs to Ernest II, 1844–1893 ==
Person	Name	Status	Relation	Became Hereditary Prince	Reason	Ceased to be Hereditary Prince	Reason	Next in succession, relation to heir
	Albert, Prince Consort	Heir presumptive	Younger brother	29 July 1844	Elder brother acceded to throne	14 December 1861	Died	Albert Edward, Prince of Wales, son
	Albert Edward, Prince of Wales	Heir presumptive	Nephew	14 December 1861	Father died	19 April 1863	Renounced succession rights	Prince Alfred, brother
	Prince Alfred, Duke of Edinburgh	Heir presumptive	Nephew	19 April 1863	Elder brother renounced succession rights	22 August 1893	Acceded to throne as Alfred I	Prince Arthur, Duke of Connaught and Strathearn, 1863–1874, brother
	Prince Alfred, Duke of Edinburgh	Heir presumptive	Nephew	19 April 1863	Elder brother renounced succession rights	22 August 1893	Acceded to throne as Alfred I	Prince Alfred of Edinburgh, 1874–1893, son

== Heirs to Alfred I, 1893–1900 ==
Person	Name	Status	Relation	Became Hereditary Prince	Reason	Ceased to be Hereditary Prince	Reason	Next in succession, relation to heir
	Hereditary Prince Alfred	Heir apparent	Eldest son	22 August 1893	Father acceded to throne	6 February 1899	Died	Prince Arthur, Duke of Connaught and Strathearn, uncle
	Prince Arthur, Duke of Connaught and Strathearn	Heir presumptive	Brother	6 February 1899	Nephew died	15 July 1899	Order of succession altered	Prince Arthur of Connaught, son/1st cousin
	Prince Charles Edward, Duke of Albany	Heir presumptive	Nephew	15 July 1899	Order of succession altered	30 July 1900	Acceded to throne as Charles Edward I	Prince Arthur of Connaught, son/1st cousin

== Heirs to Charles Edward I, 1900–1918 ==
Person	Name	Status	Relation	Became Hereditary Prince	Reason	Ceased to be Hereditary Prince	Reason	Next in succession, relation to heir
	Prince Arthur of Connaught	Heir presumptive	1st Cousin	30 July 1900	Cousin acceded to throne	2 August 1906	Son born to duke	Edward VII of the United Kingdom, uncle
	Hereditary Prince Johann Leopold	Heir apparent	Eldest son	2 August 1906	Born	14 November 1918	Monarchy abolished	Prince Arthur of Connaught, 1906–1909, 1st cousin once removed
	Hereditary Prince Johann Leopold	Heir apparent	Eldest son	2 August 1906	Born	14 November 1918	Monarchy abolished	Prince Hubertus, 1909–1918, brother
