= Beiersdorf (Coburg) =

District of Coburg, Bavaria, Germany

Coordinates: 50°17′09″N 10°55′33″E

Beiersdorf (Coburg) is the Western district of the Bavarian city of Coburg.

With a population of 1,421 on 7,31 km^{2}, it has a population density of 194 per km^{2}. Beiersdorf is the home of the Waldorf school Coburg and the summer residence of the dukes of Coburg, Schloss Callenberg.
