= Kelly Rondestvedt =

American investment banker

- Princess of Saxe-Coburg and Gotha
- Born: Kelly Jeanne Rondestvedt; January 10, 1975 (age 51); Pensacola, Escambia County, Florida, U.S.
- Spouse: Hubertus, Prince of Saxe-Coburg and Gotha (m. 2009)
- Issue: 3
Names
- Kelly Jeanne Rondestvedt
- House: Saxe-Coburg and Gotha (by marriage)
- Father: Christian Robert Rondestvedt
- Mother: Cheryl Ann Forbes
- Occupation: Investment banker

Kelly, Princess of Saxe-Coburg and Gotha (born January 10, 1975), born Kelly Jeanne Rondestvedt, is an American investment banker. She is married to Hubertus, Prince of Saxe-Coburg and Gotha, the current Head of the House of Saxe-Coburg and Gotha.

== Early life and family ==
Kelly Jeanne Rondestvedt was born on January 10, 1975, in Pensacola, Escambia County, Florida. Her father, Captain Christian Robert Rondestvedt (b. 1950, Massachusetts), is a retired pilot in the United States Navy and her mother, Cheryl Ann Rondestvedt née Forbes (1951-2001), was a former middle school teacher. She has two younger brothers, Christian and James. She is of Norwegian, English, Scottish, German and French descent. When she was a child, Rondestvedt's family moved to Kings County, California.

== Education and career ==
She graduated as a salutatorian from Lemoore Union High School in 1993.

Rondestvedt attended the University of California, Los Angeles, and earned a Bachelor of Arts degree in Economics in 1997. After graduating, she began working as an investment banker for PricewaterhouseCoopers in San Diego. She became a California certified public accountant on 6 August 2000. In 2002 she graduated with a Master's Degree in Business Administration from UCLA's Anderson School of Management. In 2007 she began working as an associate for Morgan Stanley before being promoted to vice president.

== Marriage and issue ==
Rondestvedt met Hubertus, Hereditary Prince of Saxe-Coburg and Gotha, at a restaurant in New York in 2007. They were married in a civil ceremony at Callenberg Castle, Coburg, on May 21, 2009 and again in a Lutheran ceremony at St. Moritz Church in Coburg, Bavaria, on May 23, 2009. There were over 400 wedding guests and 3000 spectators, including King Carl XVI Gustaf and Queen Silvia of Sweden, Lord Nicholas Windsor, Lady Nicholas Windsor, Simeon II of Bulgaria, and Princess Astrid of Belgium, Archduchess of Austria-Este. The couple have three children.

== Honours ==
National

- Knight Grand Cross of the Saxe-Ernestine House Order (21 May 2009)

Foreign

- Sweden: Recipient of the King Carl XVI Gustaf's Jubilee Commemorative Medal for the 70th Birthday (30/04/2016).
