= Andreas Prinz von Sachsen-Coburg und Gotha =

German landowner (1943–2025)

Andreas
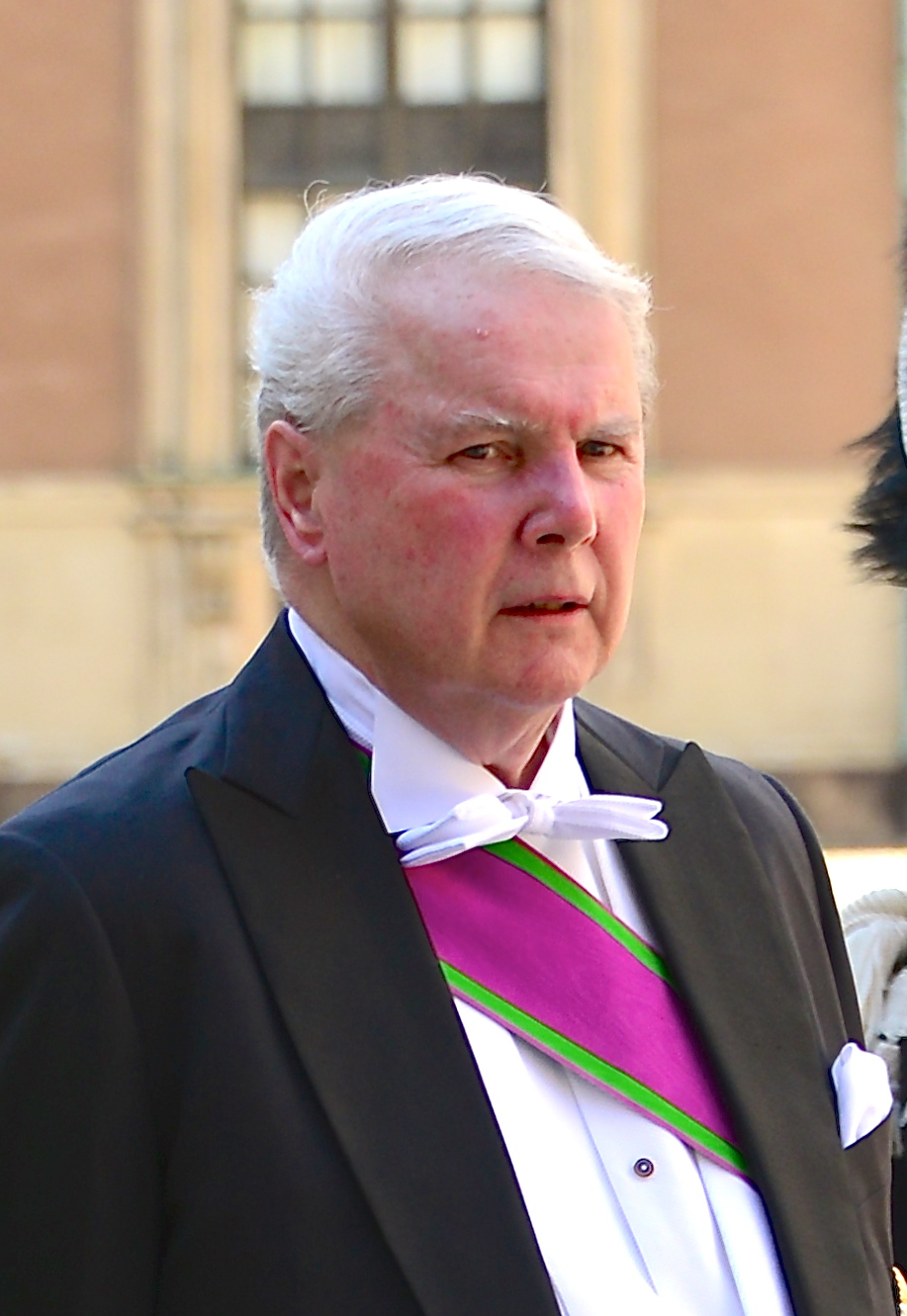
- At the wedding of Princess Madeleine of Sweden, 8 June 2013

Head of the House of Saxe-Coburg and Gotha
- Tenure: 23 January 1998 – 3 April 2025
- Predecessor: Friedrich Josias
- Successor: Hubertus
- Born: 21 March 1943; Schloss Casel, Kasel-Golzig, Gau March of Brandenburg, Province of Brandenburg, Free State of Prussia, Nazi Germany
- Died: 3 April 2025 (aged 82); Coburg, Bavaria, Germany
- Spouse: Carin Dabelstein (m. 1971; died 2023)
- Issue: Princess Stephanie of Saxe-Coburg and Gotha; Hubertus Prinz von Sachsen-Coburg und Gotha; Prince Alexander of Saxe-Coburg and Gotha
Names
- German: Andreas Michael Friedrich Hans Armin Siegfried Hubertus Prinz von Sachsen-Coburg und Gotha Herzog von Sachsen
- House: Saxe-Coburg and Gotha
- Father: Friedrich Josias, Prince of Saxe‑Coburg and Gotha
- Mother: Countess Viktoria-Luise of Solms-Baruth

Andreas Michael Friedrich Hans Armin Siegfried Hubertus Prinz von Sachsen-Coburg und Gotha Herzog von Sachsen (21 March 1943 – 3 April 2025) was a German landowner who was the head of the former ducal House of Saxe-Coburg and Gotha from 1998 until his death in 2025.

== Early life ==
Andreas was born at Schloss Casel in Lower Lusatia to Friedrich Josias, Prince of Saxe-Coburg and Gotha and the former Countess Viktoria-Luise of Solms-Baruth. Friedrich Josias was a son of Charles Edward, the last Duke of Saxe-Coburg and Gotha. Also, via Charles Edward, Andreas was a first cousin of King Carl XVI Gustaf of Sweden (and was the godfather of Carl Gustaf's younger daughter, Princess Madeleine, Duchess of Hälsingland and Gästrikland).

Andreas's parents divorced in 1946. In 1949, he moved to New Orleans in the United States, where he spent his childhood with his mother and her second husband, Richard Whitten.

Andreas became heir apparent to the headship of the former ducal house on 6 March 1954, when his father became the head. From the age of 16, Andreas made regular visits to Germany in preparation for his future role as head of the house, permanently returning in 1965. He completed his military service between 1966 and 1968 in the Armoured Reconnaissance Battalion 6 based in Eutin, Schleswig-Holstein.

== Head of the house ==
Andreas succeeded to the headship of the family upon his father's death on 23 January 1998.

Andreas was the owner of Callenberg Castle in Coburg and Greinburg Castle in Grein, Austria. He managed the family estates including farms, forests and real estate.

== Marriage and issue ==
In Hamburg civilly on 18 June and religiously on 31 July 1971, Andreas married Carin Dabelstein (16 July 1946, Hamburg – 11 November 2023, Coburg), daughter of Adolf Wilhelm Martin Dabelstein, manufacturer and merchant, and wife Irma Maria Margarete Callsen.

They had three children:

- Princess Stephanie Sybilla of Saxe-Coburg and Gotha (b. 31 January 1972 in Hamburg), married on 5 July 2018 with Dr. Jan Stahl (b. 1968)
- Hubertus Prinz von Sachsen-Coburg und Gotha (b. 16 September 1975 in Hamburg) married on 21 May 2009 with Kelly Rondestvedt. They have three children.
- Prince Alexander Philipp of Saxe-Coburg and Gotha (b. 4 May 1977).

== Death ==
Andreas died in Coburg on 3 April 2025, at the age of 82.

== Notes ==
Andreas Prinz von Sachsen-Coburg und Gotha House of Saxe-Coburg and Gotha Cadet branch of the House of Wettin Born: 21 March 1943 Died: 3 April 2025
Titles in pretence
Preceded by Friedrich Josias	— TITULAR — Duke of Saxe-Coburg and Gotha; 23 January 1998 – 3 April 2025; Reason for succession failure: Duchy abolished in 1918	Succeeded by Hubertus
