= Princess Victoria Adelaide of Schleswig-Holstein =

Duchess of Saxe-Coburg and Gotha from 1905 to 1918

Victoria Adelaide
- Duchess of Albany
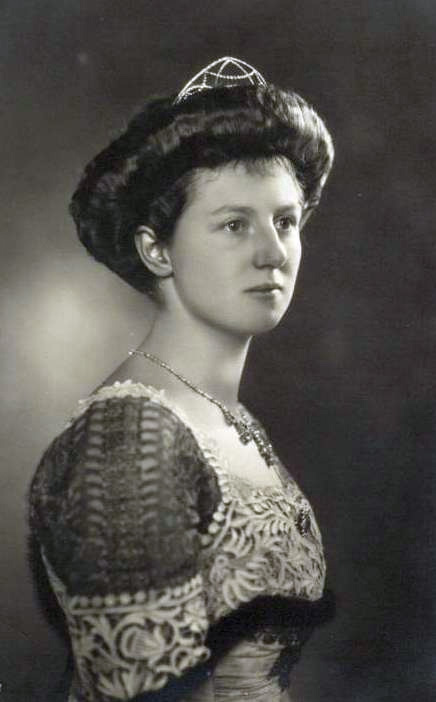

Duchess consort of Saxe-Coburg and Gotha
- Tenure: 11 October 1905 – 14 November 1918
- Born: 31 December 1885; Gut Grünholz (Thumby, Schleswig-Holstein, Kingdom of Prussia, German Empire)
- Died: 3 October 1970 (aged 84); Greinburg, Austria
- Spouse: Charles Edward, Duke of Saxe-Coburg and Gotha (m. 1905; died 1954)
- Issue: Johann Leopold, Hereditary Prince of Saxe-Coburg and Gotha; Princess Sibylla, Duchess of Västerbotten; Prince Hubertus; Princess Caroline Mathilde, Countess of Castell-Rüdenhausen; Friedrich Josias, Prince of Saxe-Coburg and Gotha
Names
- Victoria Adelaide Helena Louise Mary Frederica; German: Viktoria Adelheid Helene Luise Marie Friederike
- House: Glücksburg
- Father: Friedrich Ferdinand, Duke of Schleswig-Holstein
- Mother: Princess Karoline Mathilde of Schleswig-Holstein-Sonderburg-Augustenburg

Princess Victoria Adelaide of Schleswig-Holstein-Sonderburg-Glücksburg (German: Viktoria Adelheid Helene Luise Marie Friederike; 31 December 1885 – 3 October 1970) was Duchess of Saxe-Coburg and Gotha as the consort of Duke Charles Edward from their marriage on 11 October 1905 until his abdication on 14 November 1918.

Victoria Adelaide's marriage to Charles Edward was arranged by German emperor Wilhelm II. She was chosen for her perceived political loyalty to the Imperial German government and her symbolic significance as a German wife for the British-born duke. She was seen as unpretentious and gained popularity among the people of the Duchy. After his forced abdication in 1918, Charles Edward became an enthusiastic supporter of Nazism. Sources differ on how enthusiastically Victoria Adelaide supported these beliefs.

== Early life ==
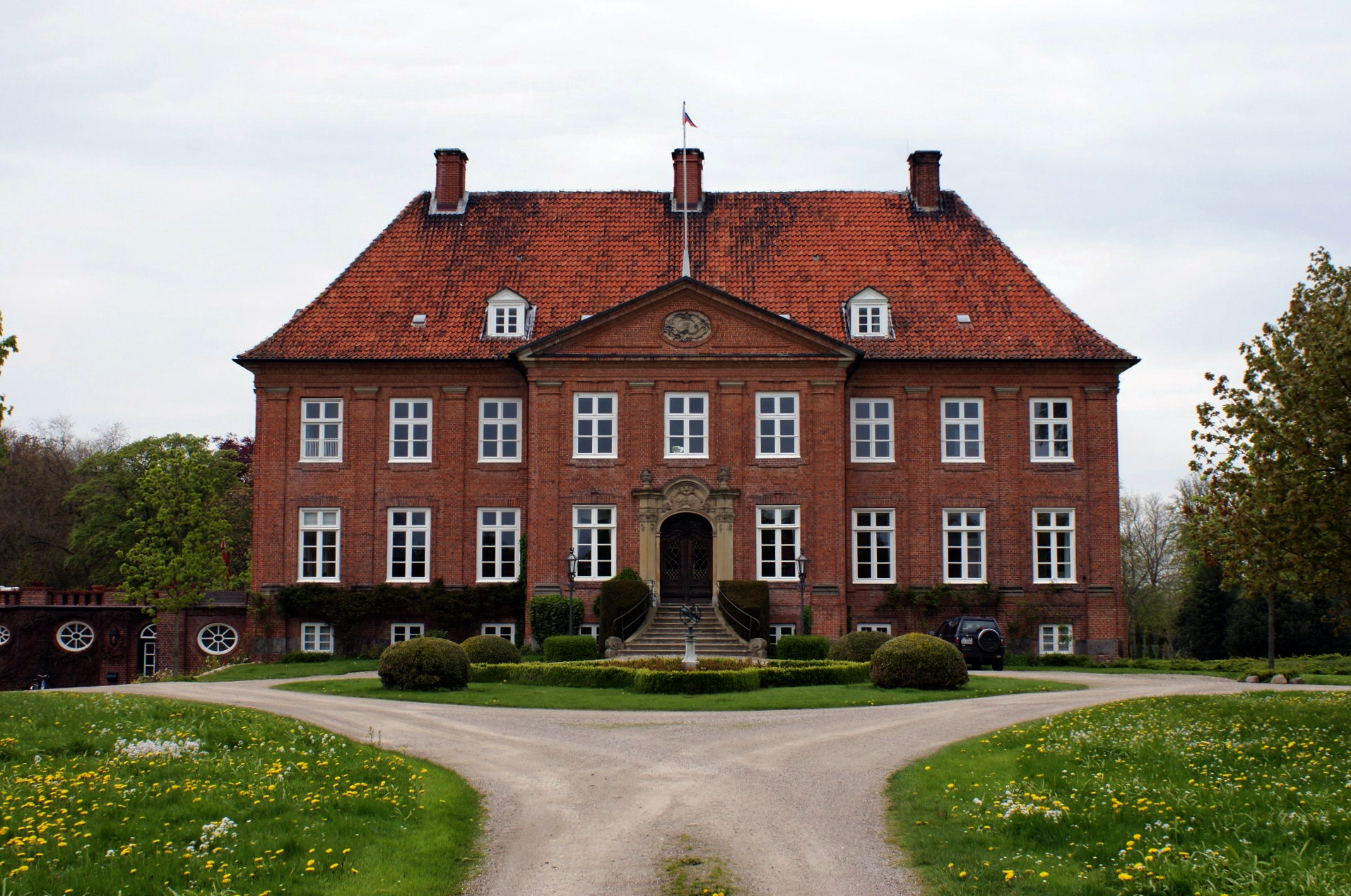
Princess Victoria Adelaide's birthplace: Grünholz Castle, photographed in 2010.

Victoria Adelaide was born on 31 December 1885 at Castle Grünholz, Thumby, Schleswig-Holstein, Prussia as the eldest daughter of Frederick Ferdinand, Duke of Schleswig-Holstein-Sonderburg-Glücksburg and his wife Princess Karoline Mathilde of Schleswig-Holstein-Sonderburg-Augustenburg.

Victoria Adelaide's mother was a sister of Augusta Victoria of Schleswig-Holstein, German Empress by marriage to Wilhelm II. Also, Victoria Adelaide's father was the eldest son of Friedrich, Duke of Schleswig-Holstein-Sonderburg-Glücksburg and a nephew of Christian IX of Denmark.

One month before the birth of Victoria Adelaide, Friedrich Ferdinand had succeeded to the headship of the House of Schleswig-Holstein-Sonderburg-Glücksburg and the title of duke upon the death of his father on 27 November 1885.

A report in the Alcester Chronicle, a British local newspaper, published in 1909, commented that Victoria Adelaide and her sisters had been allowed by their father to learn a women's occupation in case they ever needed to support themselves. According to the report, Victoria Adelaide had gained a qualification from the "Berlin Royal School of Cookery".

== Duchess of Saxe-Coburg and Gotha ==
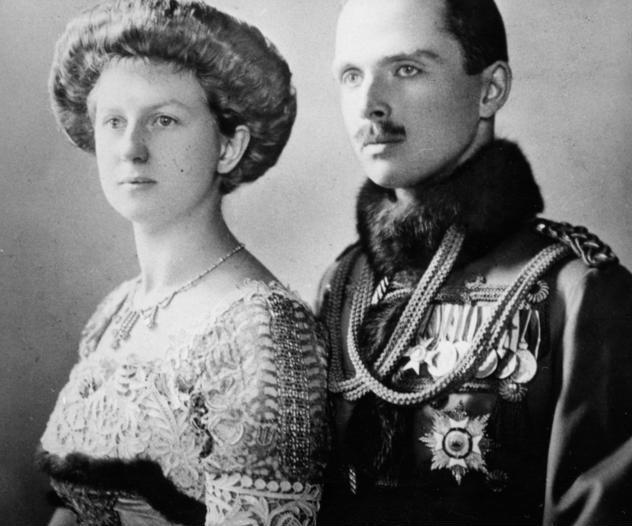
The Duke Charles Eduard and Duchess Victoria Adelaide of Saxe-Coburg and Gotha, 11 October 1905.

On 11 October 1905, at Glücksburg Castle, Schleswig, she married Charles Edward, Duke of Saxe-Coburg and Gotha. Charles Edward was the only son of Prince Leopold, Duke of Albany by his wife Princess Helena of Waldeck and a grandson of Queen Victoria. Five years before the marriage, he had succeeded to the duchy of Saxe-Coburg and Gotha upon the death of his uncle Alfred, Duke of Saxe-Coburg and Gotha in 1900. As Charles Edward was considered to have an "ambiguous" attitude towards women, according to historian Karena Urbach, his family decided he needed an arranged marriage at a young age. Victoria Adelaide was chosen by her uncle Wilhelm II, the German Emperor, as the bride of Charles Edward. She was believed to be well-adjusted and loyal to Wilhelm's royal house.

She lacked any non-German or Jewish ancestry which was seen as important as her new husband was British-born. The local newspaper commented that the people of the Duchy "will always prefer to welcome a princess born into their own tribe as mother of the country [Duchess] than a stranger"

Victoria Adelaide was described, in her grandson's memoirs, as the leading part of the marriage and the Duke would initially come to her for advice. Victoria Adelaide was well-liked and seen as open to ordinary people. She often walked around her husband's territories talking to people and knew many members of the local population. She and her husband had five children born between 1906 and 1918: Prince Johann Leopold (1906—1972), Princess Sibylla (1908—1972), Prince Hubertus (1909—1943), Princess Caroline Mathilde (1912—1983), and Prince Friedrich Josias (1918—1998). As was the norm among families of their social class at the time, caring for the children was mainly delegated to domestic servants. The family often spoke English at home.

== Later life ==
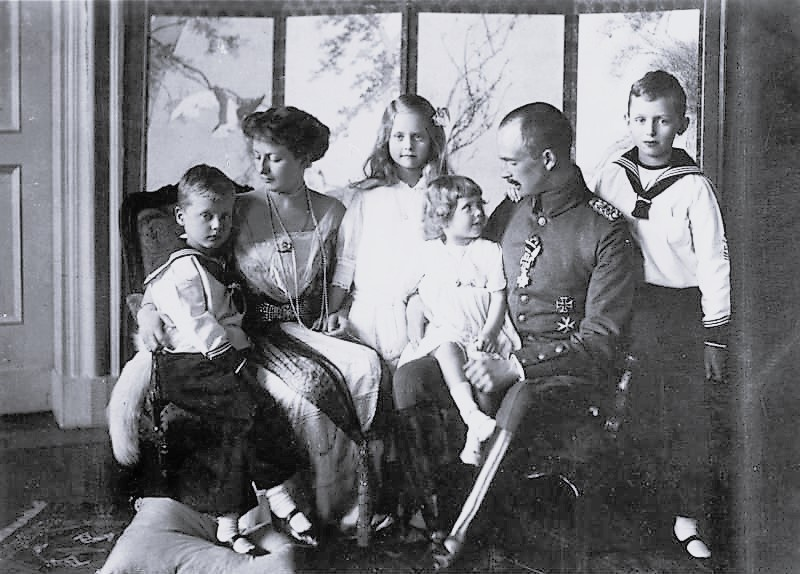
The family of Saxe-Coburg and Gotha.

In 1918, the Duke was forced to abdicate his ducal throne, following the end of World War I, forcing the family to become private citizens. Charles Edward was an early and fervent supporter of Adolf Hitler. At a 1929 local election in Coburg, Victoria Adelaide attended Nazi party campaign events alongside her husband. According to some accounts, she initially shared her husband's enthusiasm and patriotism but came to loathe the Nazi Party following the Nazi seizure of power. She defied her husband by supporting the German Evangelical Church Confederation against the antisemitic German Christians. However, Urbach describes this version of events as a "family myth". She states that Victoria Adelaide's views aligned with her husband's and the former duchess maintained her support for Nazism into the postwar period. In an interview shortly after the war ended she said her husband had been motivated by patriotism and "stumbled on his own idealism". A report in the local newspaper, marking Victoria Adelaide's 80th birthday in 1965, described her warmly commenting that

It will never be forgotten that the Duchess — a niece of the German Empress Augusta Viktoria — was never afraid to go shopping for herself and others at the market with a handle basket, or after 1945 to go shopping by bicycle from Callenberg Castle... [to] Coburg. Because of this self-evident simplicity, the Coburgers count her among their own. They never forget what they owe to their former duchess.

== Issue ==
Name	Birth	Death	Notes
Johann Leopold, Hereditary Prince of Saxe-Coburg and Gotha	2 August 1906	4 May 1972	married (1; unequally, renouncing his rights to the headship of the House of Saxe-Coburg and Gotha), 9 March 1932, Feodora, Baroness von der Horst; divorced 1962; had issue (2), 5 May 1963, Maria Theresa Reindl; no issue
Princess Sibylla of Saxe-Coburg and Gotha	18 January 1908	28 November 1972	married, 20 October 1932, Prince Gustav Adolf, Duke of Västerbotten; had issue, inc. Carl XVI Gustaf of Sweden
Prince Hubertus of Saxe-Coburg and Gotha	24 August 1909	26 November 1943	childless, died during the Second World War
Princess Caroline Mathilde of Saxe-Coburg and Gotha	22 June 1912	5 September 1983	married (1), 14 December 1931, Friedrich Wolfgang Otto, Count of Castell-Rüdenhausen; divorced 2 May 1938; had issue (2), 22 June 1938, Captain Max Schnirring; he died 1944; had issue (3), 23 December 1946, Karl Otto "Jim" Andrée; divorced 1949; no issue
Prince Friedrich Josias of Saxe-Coburg and Gotha	29 November 1918	23 January 1998	married (1), 25 January 1942, Countess Viktoria-Luise of Solms-Baruth; divorced 19 September 1947; had issue (2), 14 February 1948, Denyse Henriette de Muralt; divorced 17 September 1964; had issue (3), 30 October 1964, Katherine Bremme; no issue

== Ancestry ==
Ancestors of Princess Victoria Adelaide of Schleswig-Holstein

8. Friedrich Wilhelm, Duke of Schleswig-Holstein-Sonderburg-Glücksburg
4. Friedrich, Duke of Schleswig-Holstein-Sonderburg-Glücksburg
9. Princess Louise Caroline of Hesse-Kassel
2. Friedrich Ferdinand, Duke of Schleswig-Holstein
10. George William, Prince of Schaumburg-Lippe
5. Princess Adelheid of Schaumburg-Lippe
11. Princess Ida of Waldeck and Pyrmont
1. Princess Victoria Adelaide of Schleswig-Holstein
12. Christian August II, Duke of Schleswig-Holstein-Sonderburg-Augustenburg
6. Frederick VIII, Duke of Schleswig-Holstein
13. Countess Louise Sophie Danneskiold-Samsøe
3. Princess Karoline Mathilde of Schleswig-Holstein-Sonderburg-Augustenburg
14. Ernst I, Prince of Hohenlohe-Langenburg
7. Princess Adelheid of Hohenlohe-Langenburg
15. Princess Feodora of Leiningen

Princess Victoria Adelaide of Schleswig-Holstein House of Schleswig-Holstein-Sonderburg-Glücksburg Cadet branch of the House of Oldenburg Born: 31 December 1885 Died: 3 October 1970
German nobility
Vacant Title last held by Maria Alexandrovna of Russia	Duchess consort of Saxe-Coburg and Gotha; 11 October 1905 – 14 November 1918	Monarchy abolished German revolution
Titles in pretence
Preceded by None	— TITULAR — Duchess consort of Saxe-Coburg and Gotha; 14 November 1918 – 6 March 1954	Succeeded by Denyse Henrietta de Muralt
