= Countess Viktoria-Luise of Solms-Baruth =

Countess Viktoria-Luise
- Hereditary Princess of Saxe-Coburg and Gotha
- Born: 13 March 1921; Schloss Casel, Casel, Weimar Republic
- Died: 1 March 2003 (aged 81); Louisiana, United States
- Spouse: Friedrich Josias, Hereditary Prince of Saxe-Coburg and Gotha (m. 1942; div. 1946) Richard Whitten (m. 1947; died 2001)
- Issue: Andreas, Prince of Saxe-Coburg and Gotha; Victoria Astrid Whitten
Names
- Victoria-Louise Frederica Caroline Mathilde; German: Viktoria-Luise Friederike Karoline Mathilde
- House: Solms-Baruth
- Father: Count Hans of Solms-Baruth
- Mother: Princess Karoline Mathilde of Schleswig-Holstein-Sonderburg-Glücksburg

Countess Viktoria-Luise of Solms-Baruth (Christened as Countess Viktoria-Luise Friederike Karoline Mathilde of Solms-Baruth; 13 March 1921 – 1 March 2003) was a German noblewoman.

== Early life ==
Countess Viktoria-Luise was born at Schloss Casel in Casel, Weimar Republic, to Count Hans of Solms-Baruth and Princess Karoline Mathilde of Schleswig-Holstein-Sonderburg-Glücksburg. Her maternal grandparents were Friedrich Ferdinand, Duke of Schleswig-Holstein-Sonderburg-Glücksburg, and Princess Karoline Mathilde of Schleswig-Holstein-Sonderburg-Augustenburg.

== Marriages ==
On 25 January 1942, Viktoria-Louise married her first cousin, Friedrich Josias, Prince of Saxe-Coburg and Gotha, at the Pfarr- und Patronatskirche Kasel. She and Friedrich Josias divorced on 19 September 1946. They had one child:

- Andreas, Prince of Saxe-Coburg and Gotha (21 March 1943 – 3 April 2025).

She married, secondly, Richard Carlyle Babb Whitten on 6 November 1947 at Steinwänd bei Werfen, Austria. They were remarried in a religious ceremony on 14 February 1948 at San Francisco, California. They had one child:

- Victoria Astrid Solms Whitten (b. 23 August 1948 in Salzburg, Austria).

== Ancestry ==
Ancestors of Countess Viktoria-Luise of Solms-Baruth

8. Friedrich, Prince of Solms-Baruth
4. Friedrich, Prince of Solms-Baruth
9. Countess Rosa Teleki de Szek
2. Count Hans of Solms-Baruth
10. Hans Heinrich XI of Hochberg, Prince of Pless
5. Countess Luise of Hochberg
11. Marie von Kleist
1. Countess Viktoria-Luise of Solms-Baruth
12. Friedrich, Duke of Schleswig-Holstein-Sonderburg-Glücksburg
6. Friedrich Ferdinand, Duke of Schleswig-Holstein-Sonderburg-Glücksburg
13. Princess Adelheid of Schaumburg-Lippe
3. Princess Karoline Mathilde of Schleswig-Holstein-Sonderburg-Glücksburg
14. Frederick VIII, Duke of Schleswig-Holstein-Sonderburg-Augustenburg
7. Princess Karoline Mathilde of Schleswig-Holstein-Sonderburg-Augustenburg
15. Princess Adelheid of Hohenlohe-Langenburg
