= Henrik Arnstad =

Swedish journalist, author and historian

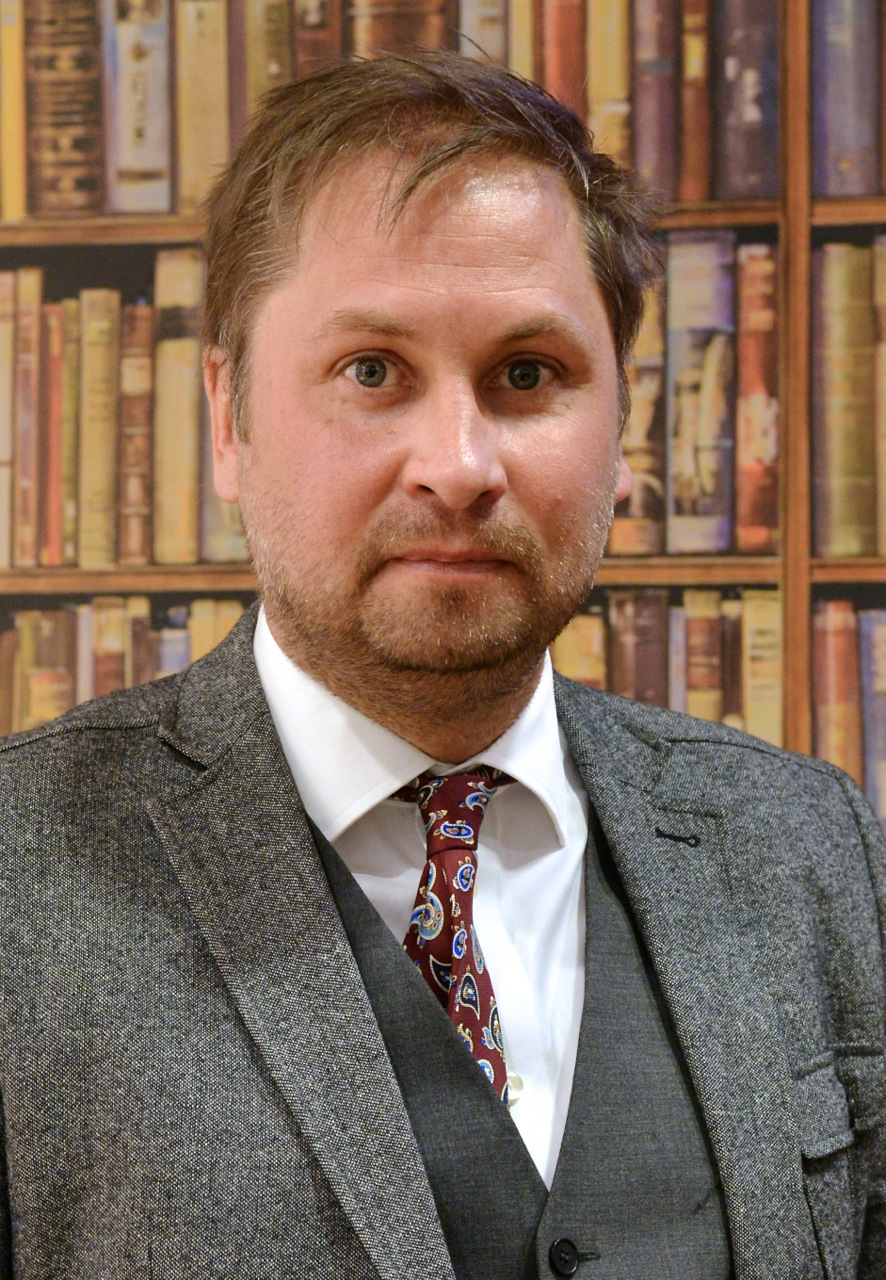
- Arnstad in 2013
- Born: John Henrik Arnstad; 1967 (age 58–59) Uppsala, Sweden
- Genre: Popular history

John Henrik Arnstad (born 1967) is a Swedish journalist, author and historian, who specializes in popular works on history and fascism. He has also published works on contemporary Swedish politics.

== Publications ==
- Älskade fascism: De svartbruna rörelsernas ideologi och historia (2013)
- Skyldig till skuld: En europeisk resa i Nazitysklands skugga (2009)
- Hatade demokrati: De inkluderande rörelsernas ideologi och historia (2018)
