= Alfred, Hereditary Prince of Saxe-Coburg and Gotha =

Alfred
- Hereditary Prince of Saxe-Coburg and Gotha
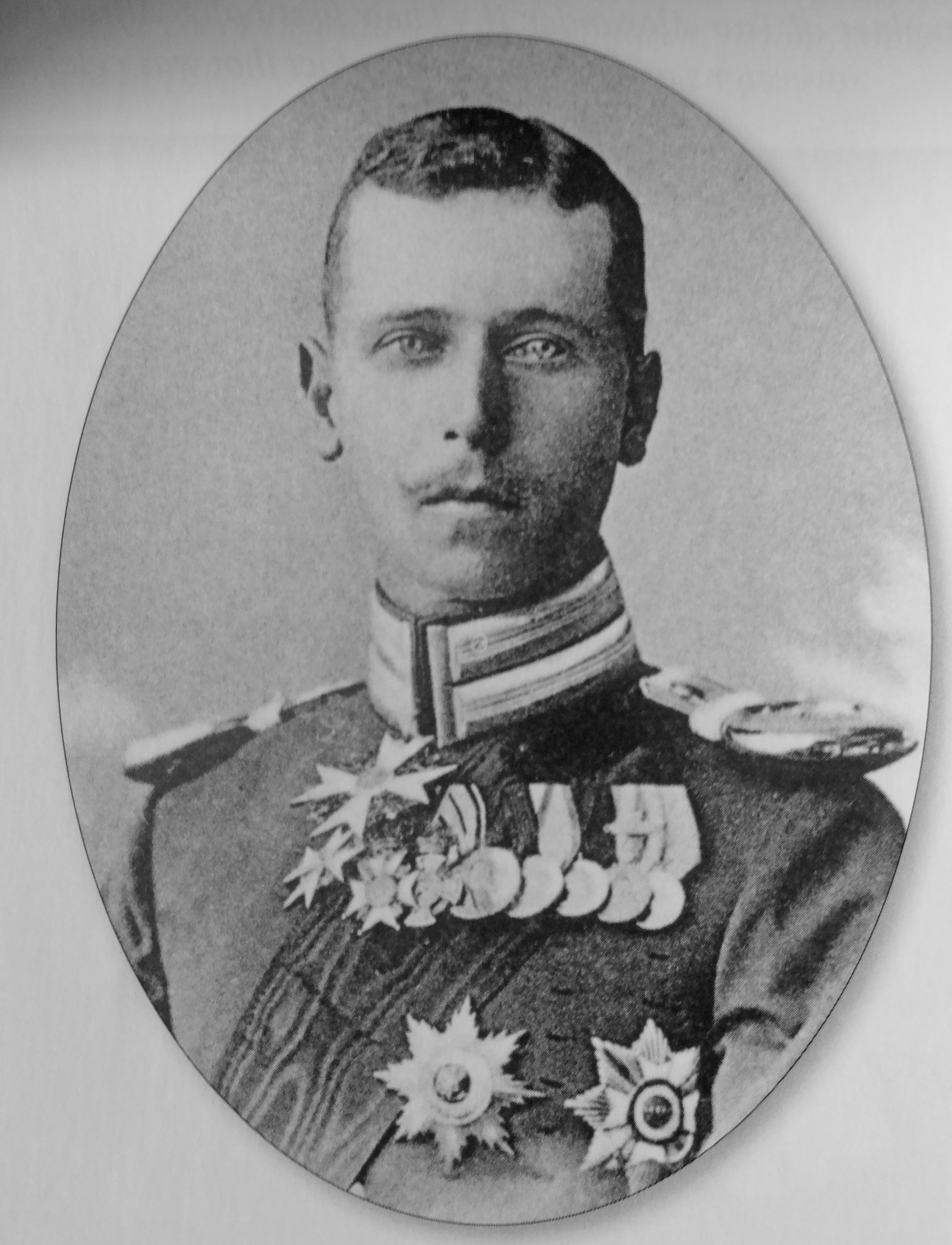
- Photograph, 1890s
- Born: Prince Alfred of Edinburgh; 15 October 1874; Buckingham Palace, London, United Kingdom
- Died: 6 February 1899 (aged 24); Sanatorium Martinsbrunn, Meran, Austria-Hungary
- Burial: Friedhof am Glockenberg, Coburg, Germany
Names
- Alfred Alexander William Ernest Albert
- House: Saxe-Coburg and Gotha
- Father: Alfred, Duke of Saxe-Coburg and Gotha
- Mother: Grand Duchess Maria Alexandrovna of Russia

Alfred, Hereditary Prince of Saxe-Coburg and Gotha (Alfred Alexander William Ernest Albert; 15 October 1874 – 6 February 1899), was the son and heir apparent of Alfred, Duke of Saxe-Coburg and Gotha. He died aged 24 under circumstances still not entirely clear. As a grandson of Queen Victoria, he was a first cousin of Wilhelm II of Germany, George V of the United Kingdom, Nicholas II of Russia, Queen Maud of Norway, Queen Sophia of Greece, and Queen Victoria Eugenie of Spain, among others.

== Early life ==
Alfred of Edinburgh was born on 15 October 1874 at Buckingham Palace, London. His father was Prince Alfred, Duke of Edinburgh, second eldest son of Queen Victoria and Prince Albert. His mother, Grand Duchess Maria Alexandrovna of Russia, was a daughter of Emperor Alexander II of Russia and Princess Marie of Hesse and by Rhine.

Archibald Campbell Tait, Archbishop of Canterbury, baptised the prince in the Lower Bow Room of Buckingham Palace on 23 November 1874. His godparents were the Queen, the Emperor of Russia (whose son Tsesarevich Alexander stood proxy for him), the German Emperor (for whom Alfred's paternal uncle Prince Arthur, Duke of Connaught and Strathearn stood proxy), the German Crown Princess (Alfred's paternal aunt, for whom her sister Princess Christian of Schleswig-Holstein stood proxy), the Duke of Saxe-Coburg and Gotha (his paternal grand-uncle, for whom Prince Christian of Schleswig-Holstein stood proxy), and the Prince of Wales (his paternal uncle).

== Hereditary Prince of Saxe-Coburg and Gotha ==
In 1893, his granduncle, Ernest II, Duke of Saxe-Coburg and Gotha, the elder brother of his paternal grandfather, died without legitimate heirs. Being ineligible under Saxe-Coburg-Gotha house law to succeed to the duchy due to his status as the heir apparent to an existing throne, the Prince of Wales had previously renounced his claim to the ducal throne. Thus, the succession devolved to Alfred's father, who was at that time the Duke of Edinburgh. Alfred thus became the Hereditary Prince of Saxe-Coburg and Gotha.

Alfred had lived at Clarence House in the early years of his life with his parents and sisters; after his father's accession to the ducal throne of Saxe-Coburg and Gotha, he moved to Schloss Rosenau, near Coburg.

Around 1895-1896, the elegant, blond-haired, Princess Beatrice of Bourbon, was considered as a potential bride for Alfred, but her father refused the idea of his daughter marrying a Protestant. There is no evidence that Alfred ever met Beatrice, but her grandmother Archduchess Maria Beatrix of Austria wrote "I would have been devastated if one of my granddaughters had married him."

== Death ==
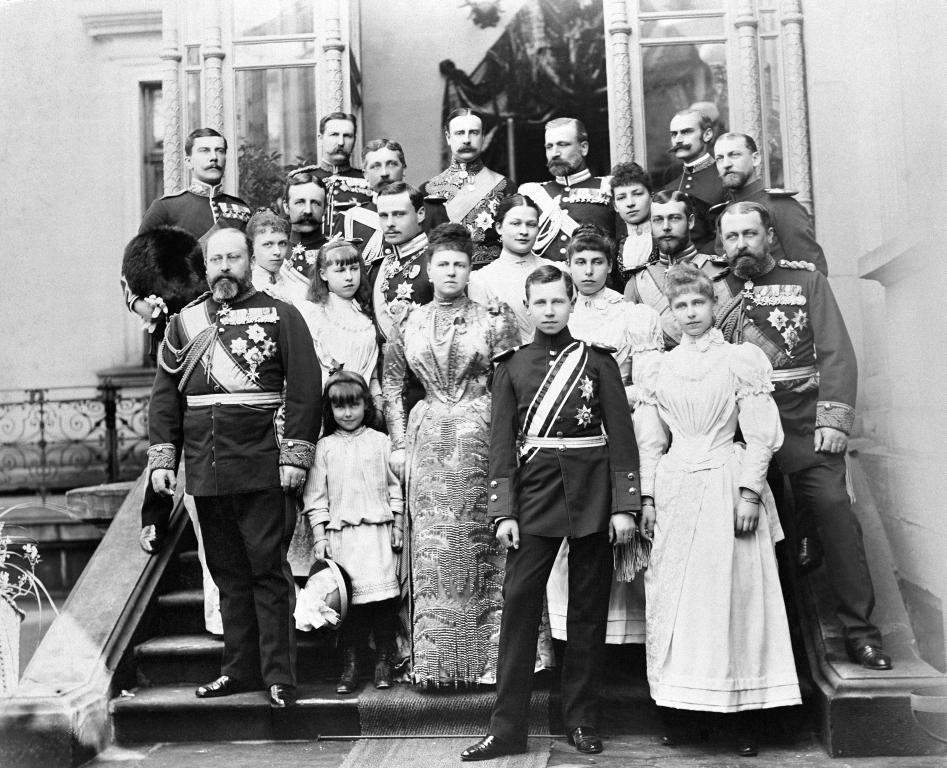
A group photograph of the family of Hereditary Prince Alfred of Saxe-Coburg and Gotha celebrating his majority, Coburg, 1892

On 23 January 1899 Maria Alexandrovna and her husband celebrated their 25th wedding anniversary at Schloss Friedenstein, the Duke's official residence in Gotha. Absent from the festivities was their only son, who was gravely ill.

The exact circumstances of Alfred's death are not known, and varying accounts have been published. His sister Marie's memoirs simply say his health "broke down", and other writers have said that he had "consumption". The Times published an account stating he had died of a tumour, while the Complete Peerage gives the generally accepted account that he "shot himself".

Various authors have speculated on reasons why he might have killed himself. One author, Frank Bush, claimed to have been a descendant of a secret marriage between Alfred and Mabel Fitzgerald, granddaughter of the 4th Duke of Leinster, and claimed that friction between Alfred and his family over the "secret marriage" was the cause of the suicide. (Note: Unfortunately for this theory, which was first published in the 1940s, and for Bush's claimed ancestry, there is no evidence Alfred and Mabel ever met; at the time of their alleged civil and religious marriages in 1898 (of which no records exist) Mabel was under 14 years old, and when Mabel contracted a documented marriage to William Clarke Hadoke in 1910 she is described as a spinster rather than a widow.) Despite the lack of documentary evidence, and the lack of contemporary reference, other authors have repeated Bush's assertion that Alfred and Mabel married, including John van der Kiste and Bee Jordaan in Dearest Affie, and the assertion is repeated as fact in the official family history (Das Haus von Sachsen-Coburg und Gotha).

According to rumours, Alfred shot himself with a revolver while the rest of the family was gathered for the anniversary celebration. He survived and was looked after at Schloss Friedenstein in Gotha (Thuringia) for three days before being sent to the Martinsbrunn Sanatorium in Gratsch near Meran in the County of Tyrol (Austria-Hungary, now Italy). Alfred died there at 4:15 pm on 6 February 1899, aged 24 years. He was buried in the ducal mausoleum of the Friedhof am Glockenberg, Coburg, Bavaria (southern Germany).

After his death, Alfred's uncle the Duke of Connaught and his son Prince Arthur of Connaught renounced their succession rights to the Duchy of Saxe-Coburg and Gotha in July 1899. As a result, his first cousin Prince Charles Edward, Duke of Albany, became heir presumptive.

== Titles, styles, honours and arms ==
=== Titles and styles ===
- 15 October 1874 – 23 August 1893: His Royal Highness Prince Alfred of Edinburgh
- 23 August 1893 – 6 February 1899: His Royal Highness The Hereditary Prince of Saxe-Coburg and Gotha

=== Honours ===
He received the following orders and decorations:

- United Kingdom:
  - Queen Victoria Golden Jubilee Medal, 21 June 1887
  - Knight of Justice of St. John, 25 April 1893
  - Knight of the Garter, 23 April 1894
  - Queen Victoria Diamond Jubilee Bar, 22 June 1897
- Prussia
  - Grand Cross of the Red Eagle, June 1889
  - Knight of the Black Eagle, 12 April 1894
  - (Grand Duchy of Hesse) Hesse and by Rhine: Grand Cross of the Ludwig Order, 19 April 1894
  - (Duchy of Saxe-Altenburg) (Saxe-Meiningen) Ernestine duchies:
    - Grand Cross of the Saxe-Ernestine House Order, 1892
    - Duke Alfred and Duchess Marie Silver Wedding Medal (Saxe-Coburg and Gotha), 23 January 1899
  - Saxe-Weimar-Eisenach: Grand Cross of the White Falcon, 1894
- Kingdom of Romania: Grand Cross of the Crown of Romania, 10 January 1893
- Russian Empire:
  - Knight of St. Andrew, 19 April 1894
  - Knight of St. Alexander Nevsky, 19 April 1894
  - Knight of the White Eagle, 19 April 1894
  - Knight of St. Anna, 1st Class, 19 April 1894
  - Knight of St. Stanislaus, 1st Class, 19 April 1894
- Belgium: Grand Cordon of the Order of Leopold (military), 22 July 1898

=== Arms ===
As a male-line grandson of the British Sovereign, young Alfred bore the royal arms, with an inescutcheon of the shield of Saxony, all differenced by a label argent of five points, the odd bearing crosses gules and even anchors azure.

Coat of arms of Prince Alfred of Edinburgh

== Ancestors ==
Ancestors of Alfred, Hereditary Prince of Saxe-Coburg and Gotha

8. Ernest I, Duke of Saxe-Coburg and Gotha
4. Prince Albert of Saxe-Coburg and Gotha
9. Princess Louise of Saxe-Gotha-Altenburg
2. Alfred, Duke of Saxe-Coburg and Gotha
10. Prince Edward, Duke of Kent and Strathearn
5. Victoria of the United Kingdom
11. Princess Victoria of Saxe-Coburg-Saalfeld
1. Alfred, Hereditary Prince of Saxe-Coburg and Gotha
12. Nicholas I of Russia
6. Alexander II of Russia
13. Princess Charlotte of Prussia
3. Grand Duchess Maria Alexandrovna of Russia
14. Louis II, Grand Duke of Hesse and by Rhine
7. Princess Marie of Hesse and by Rhine
15. Princess Wilhelmine of Baden

== In popular culture ==
- Chad Connell portrays Albert in "The Prince and the Rebel" (April 10, 2008), episode 12 of season 1 of the Canadian television period drama Murdoch Mysteries.
