= Friedrich Josias, Prince of Saxe-Coburg and Gotha =

German prince (1918–1998)

Friedrich Josias
- Prince of Saxe-Coburg and Gotha

Head of the House of Saxe-Coburg and Gotha
- Tenure: 6 March 1954 – 23 January 1998
- Predecessor: Charles Edward
- Successor: Andreas
- Born: 29 November 1918; Callenberg Castle, Coburg
- Died: 23 January 1998 (aged 79); Amstetten, Austria
- Spouses: Countess Viktoria-Luise of Solms-Baruth (m. 1942; div. 1946) Denyse Henrietta de Muralt (m. 1948; div. 1964) Katrin Bremme (m. 1964)
- Issue: Andreas, Prince of Saxe-Coburg and Gotha; Princess Claudia, Mrs. Schäfer; Beatrice Charlotte, Princess Friedrich of Saxe-Meiningen; Prince Adrian
Names
- Friedrich Josias Carl Eduard Ernst Kyrill Harald
- House: Saxe-Coburg and Gotha
- Father: Charles Edward, Duke of Saxe-Coburg and Gotha
- Mother: Princess Victoria Adelaide of Schleswig-Holstein

Friedrich Josias Carl Eduard Ernst Kyrill Harald Prinz von Sachsen-Coburg und Gotha (29 November 1918 – 24 January 1998) was a German member of a formerly noble family, the House of Saxe-Coburg and Gotha, formerly dukes of Saxe-Coburg and Gotha. He served in the army of Nazi Germany from 1938 to 1945 as an officer. He succeeded to head of the family in 1954. He was a great-grandson of Queen Victoria.

== Early life ==
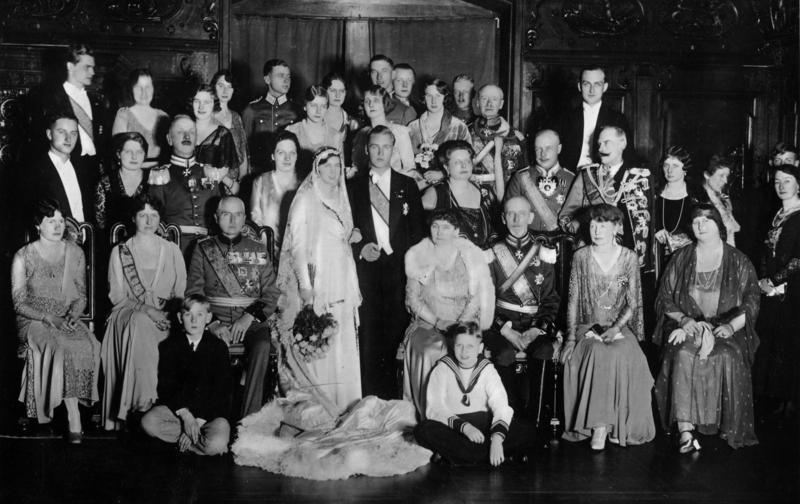
13-year-old Friedrich Josias (front left) at his sister Caroline's wedding (1931)

Friedrich Josias was born at Callenberg Castle on 29 November 1918, the third son and youngest child of Charles Edward, Duke of Saxe-Coburg and Gotha, and Princess Victoria Adelaide of Schleswig-Holstein-Sonderburg-Glücksburg. Charles Edward had been forced to abdicate earlier in the month, on 14 November 1918.

In 1938, he entered the Wehrmacht and participated in the occupation of Czechoslovakia, Poland and France. In 1941, he fought in Yugoslavia and the Soviet Union. He fell seriously ill in the winter of 1941. After his recovery, he fought in the Caucasus with the rank of First Lieutenant (Oberleutnant). In 1944, he served as an aide-de-camp (Ordonnanzoffizier) under Field Marshal Erwin Rommel on the French coast. He was stationed in June 1944 in Denmark under General von Hanneken, where he was captured by the British in May 1945. He was released in autumn 1945.

The third of three sons, Friedrich Josias was not expected to succeed as head of the family. However, his eldest brother, Johann Leopold, married unequally and renounced his rights in 1932, and his other brother Hubertus was killed in action in 1943, thus leaving Friedrich Josias as the heir to the defunct title. He succeeded to the headship upon the death of his father on 6 March 1954.

== Marriages and issue ==
In Kassel on 25 January 1942, Friedrich Josias married his first cousin, Countess Viktoria-Luise of Solms-Baruth (13 March 1921 – 1 March 2003). This marriage ended in divorce on 19 September 1946. The couple had one son:

1. Andreas Michael Armin Siegfried Friedrich Hans Hubertus (21 March 1943 – 3 April 2025).

In San Francisco on 14 February 1948, Friedrich Josias married again, to Denyse Henrietta de Muralt (14 December 1923 – 25 April 2005). Friedrich Josias and Denyse were divorced on 17 September 1964. They had three children:

1. Maria Claudia Sibylla (22 May 1949 – 5 February 2016). In 1971, Maria (Maria Claudia Sybilla) married Gion Schäfer (b. 1945). They have two daughters: Maria Christina Sybilla Schäfer (b. 1972) and Gianetta Antonia Schäfer (b. 1975). The couple divorced in 1998. Maria currently lives in Chile.
2. Beatrice Charlotte (15 July 1951), who married a distant cousin Prince Frederick Ernest of Saxe-Meiningen and had children
3. Adrian Vinzenz Eduard (18 October 1955 – 30 August 2011). His first marriage was to Lea Rinderknecht in Berne, Switzerland in 1984. Lea was born in Zürich in 1960. They had two sons, Simon (b. 1985) and Daniel (b. 1988), both born in Berne. After Adrian’s divorce in 1993, he married a second time to Gertrud Krieg in 1997 in Berne. Gertrud was also of Swiss origin as she was born in Olten, Solothurn. The couple was childless.

In Hamburg on 30 October 1964, Friedrich Josias married his third wife, Katrin Bremme (22 April 1940 – 13 July 2011). This marriage was childless.

Friedrich Josias died, aged 79, in Amstetten, Austria.

== Ancestry ==
Ancestors of Friedrich Josias, Prince of Saxe-Coburg and Gotha

8. Prince Albert of Saxe-Coburg and Gotha
4. Prince Leopold, Duke of Albany
9. Victoria of the United Kingdom
2. Charles Edward, Duke of Saxe-Coburg and Gotha
10. George Victor, Prince of Waldeck and Pyrmont
5. Princess Helena of Waldeck and Pyrmont
11. Princess Helena of Nassau
1. Friedrich Josias, Prince of Saxe-Coburg and Gotha
12. Friedrich, Duke of Schleswig-Holstein-Sonderburg-Glücksburg
6. Friedrich Ferdinand, Duke of Schleswig-Holstein-Sonderburg-Glücksburg
13. Princess Adelheid of Schaumburg-Lippe
3. Princess Victoria Adelaide of Schleswig-Holstein-Sonderburg-Glücksburg
14. Frederick VIII, Duke of Schleswig-Holstein-Sonderburg-Augustenburg
7. Princess Karoline Mathilde of Schleswig-Holstein-Sonderburg-Augustenburg
15. Princess Adelheid of Hohenlohe-Langenburg

Friedrich Josias, Prince of Saxe-Coburg and Gotha House of Saxe-Coburg and Gotha Cadet branch of the House of Wettin Born: 29 November 1918 Died: 23 January 1998
Titles in pretence
| Preceded by Carl Eduard | — TITULAR — Duke of Saxe–Coburg and Gotha; 6 March 1954 – 23 January 1998 | Succeeded by Andreas |
