= Callenberg Castle =

- Schloss Callenberg
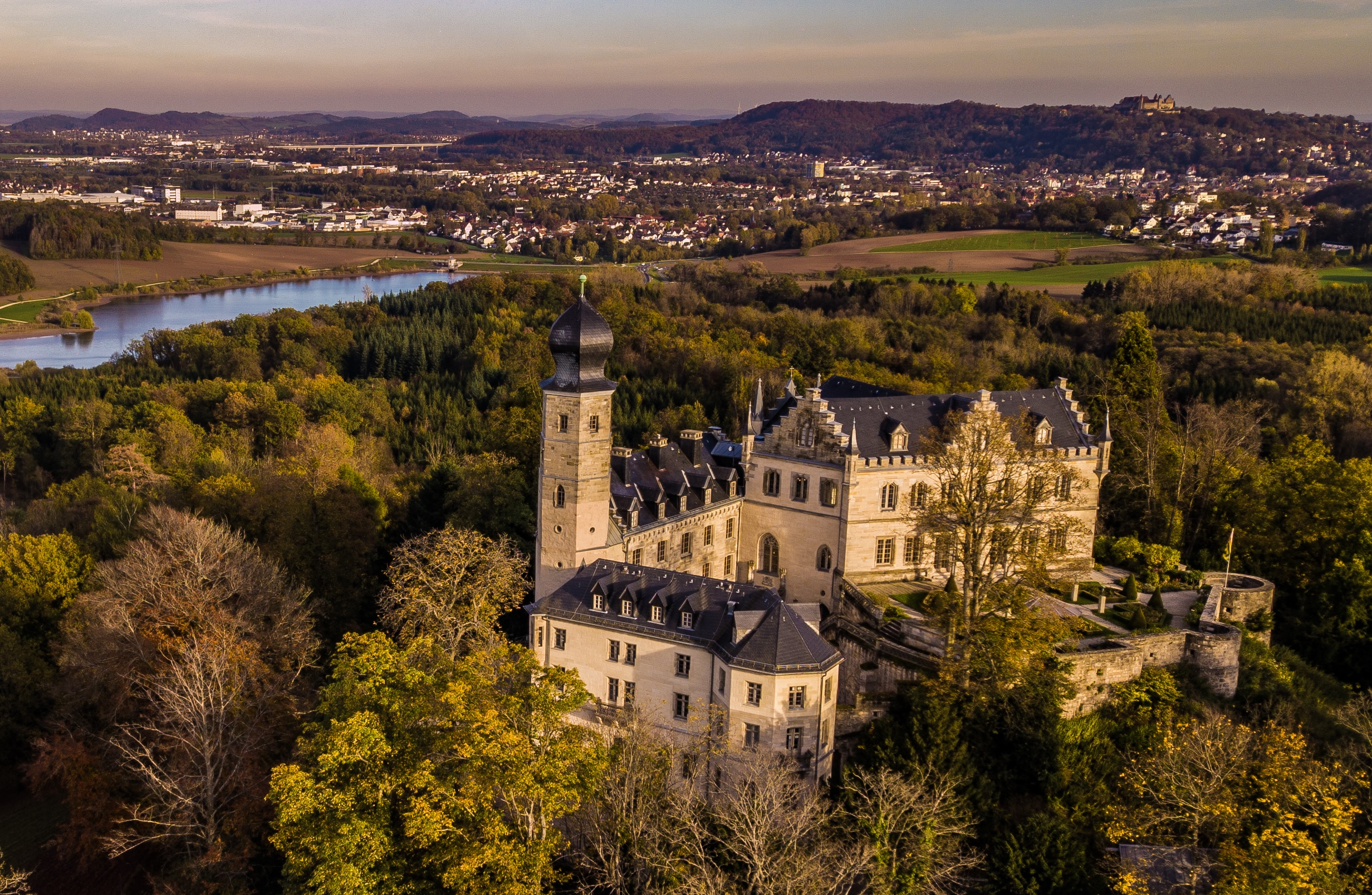
- An aerial view of Callenberg Castle

- Location within Bavaria Location within Germany

General information
- Type: Palace
- Architectural style: Gothic Revival style
- Location: Coburg, Germany
- Coordinates: 50.277°N 10.922°E
- Owner: House of Saxe-Coburg and Gotha

Callenberg Castle (Schloss Callenberg) is a schloss on a wooded hill in Beiersdorf, an Ortsteil of Coburg, Germany, 6 kilometres (3.7 mi) from the town centre. It was a hunting lodge and summer residence and has long been the principal residence of the House of Saxe-Coburg and Gotha. It was owned by Andreas, Prince of Saxe-Coburg and Gotha, who created the Ducal Saxe-Coburg and Gotha House Order. A large and architecturally important family chapel is contained within.

According to the Schloss Callenberg web site "the castle became the property of Duke Johann Casimir of Saxe-Coburg in 1588, after the death of the last von Sternberg. Until 1825 the ducal treasury and the Castle of Callenberg were property of the Dukes of Saxe-Meiningen. It was only in 1826 that the Dukes of Coburg become owners of Callenberg Castle again. Until 1945 the castle was the summer residence of the Dukes of Coburg."

== History ==
A hill castle here was first mentioned as Chalwinberch in 1122. It served as the main seat for the Ritter von Callenberg until 1231, when the lord sold it to the Prince-Bishop of Würzburg. The knight made use of the proceeds to participate in a Crusade. In 1317 the House of Henneberg purchased the property and gave it as a fief to the Sternberg family. This family died out in 1592. As a vacant property, it now fell to Duke Johann Casimir. He intended to use it as a summer palace and planned substantial renovations but during his lifetime only the castle chapel was rebuilt.

Major construction work resumed only in 1827 under Ernst I. He had the castle completely redesigned, a landscape garden was created and an exhibit farm added, in which silkworms were bred. From 1842, Callenberg was the summer residence of the heir and future duke Ernst II. Today's Gothic revival elements date to another renovation after 1857. From 1893, Callenberg served as dowager house for Princess Alexandrine of Baden, the widow of Ernest II. The last ruling duke, Carl Eduard, used Callenberg as a summer residence. After his death in 1954 he was buried here.

Post World War II, the castle fell into disrepair. It was first used by American troops and later served as a nursing home, housed a technical college and then a foundation. From the late 1970s, the castle stood empty and changed owners several times.

== Architecture ==
The chapel features Gothic arches, Doric columns, Italian Renaissance parapets, medieval walls and a Baroque pulpit.

== Today ==
Schloss Callenberg is once again owned by the House of Saxe-Coburg and Gotha. Due to its history and Gothic revival architecture it is a listed monument. Since 1998 it has displayed the ducal art and furniture collection and since 2004 it has also housed the German Rifle Museum (Deutsches Schützenmuseum). The cemetery, Cemetery Waldfriedhof or Waldfriedhof Beiersdorf, still remains, containing the remains of Charles Edward, Duke of Saxe-Coburg and Gotha and his wife Princess Victoria Adelaide of Schleswig-Holstein, among others.

== Other burials ==
- Prince Hubertus of Saxe-Coburg and Gotha (pilot)
- Friedrich Josias, Prince of Saxe-Coburg and Gotha
- Princess Claudia (Mrs. Schäfer), daughter of Friedrich Josias
- Princess Caroline Mathilde of Saxe-Coburg and Gotha
- Princess Victoria Adelaide of Schleswig-Holstein
- Charles Edward, Duke of Saxe-Coburg and Gotha
