= Johann Leopold, Hereditary Prince of Saxe-Coburg and Gotha =

Crown Prince of Saxe-Coburg and Gotha

Johann Leopold
- Hereditary Prince of Saxe-Coburg and Gotha
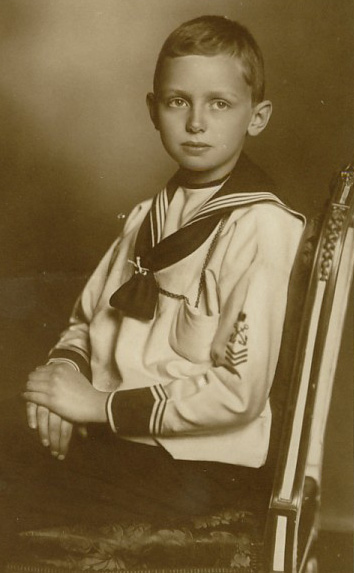
- Johann Leopold aged 9 or 10
- Born: 2 August 1906; Callenberg Castle, Coburg, Saxe-Coburg and Gotha, Germany
- Died: 4 May 1972 (aged 65); Grein, Austria
- Spouse: Feodora von der Horst (m. 1932; div. 1962) Maria Theresia Reindl (m. 1963)
- Issue: Princess Caroline Mathilde; Prince Ernst Leopold; Prince Peter Albert
Names
- John Leopold William Albert Ferdinand Victor Prince of Saxe-Coburg and Gotha; German: Johann Leopold Wilhelm Albert Ferdinand Viktor Prinz von Sachsen-Coburg und Gotha
- House: Saxe-Coburg and Gotha
- Father: Charles Edward, Duke of Saxe-Coburg and Gotha
- Mother: Princess Victoria Adelaide of Schleswig-Holstein-Sonderburg-Glücksburg

Johann Leopold, Hereditary Prince of Saxe-Coburg and Gotha (in German: Johann Leopold William Albert Ferdinand Viktor; 2 August 1906 – 4 May 1972) was the eldest son of Charles Edward, Duke of Saxe-Coburg and Gotha, and Princess Victoria Adelaide of Schleswig-Holstein-Sonderburg-Glücksburg.

== Early life ==
Johann Leopold was born 2 August 1906 at Callenberg Castle in Coburg as the eldest son of Charles Edward, Duke of Saxe-Coburg and Gotha, and Princess Victoria Adelaide of Schleswig-Holstein-Sonderburg-Glücksburg.

He was heir-apparent, from his birth, until the forced abdication of his father on 18 November 1918, to Saxe-Coburg and Gotha. The abdication was a result of the German Revolution.

As a youth in Germany's politically unsettled post-World War I period Johann Leopold was involved in right wing paramilitary activity supported by his father.

== Marriage ==
Charles Edward hoped to arrange a marriage between Prince Johann Leopold and Princess Juliana, heir presumptive to his first cousin Queen Wilhelmina of the Netherlands. The match never materialized, with Charles Edward blaming his "useless" son.

Johann Leopold's first wife was Baroness Feodora Marie Alma Margarete von der Horst (1905–1991), who divorced Wolf Sigismund, Baron Pergler von Perglas, in 1931. They married morganatically on 9 March 1932. The prince was forced to cede his own succession rights at the time of the marriage. The couple had three children and were divorced on 27 February 1962. His second wife was Maria Theresa Elizabeth Reindl (1908–1996), whom he married morganatically on 3 May 1963. They had no children.

== Issue ==
Name	Birth	Death	Notes
By Baroness Feodora von der Horst
Caroline Mathilde Adelheid Sibylla Marianne Erika Prinzessin von Sachsen-Coburg und Gotha	5 April 1933; Hirschberg, Thuringia		Marianne married Michael Nielsen (1923–1975) on 5 December 1953. They had two daughters.
Ernst Leopold Eduard Wilhelm Josias Prinz von Sachsen-Coburg und Gotha	14 January 1935; Hirschberg, Thuringia	27 June 1996; Bad Wiessee, by suicide along with his third wife Sabine.	Ernst Leopold married Ingeborg Henig (b. 16 August 1937 in Nordhausen) on 4 February 1961 in Herrenberg. They divorced on 26 March 1963. They had one son, Hubertus Prinz von Sachsen-Coburg und Gotha. He married, secondly, Gertraude Monika Pfeiffer (b. 1 July 1938 in Cottbus) on 29 May 1963, at Regensburg, Germany. They divorced on 20 September 1985. They had five children: Viktoria, Ernst-Josias, Carl-Eduard, Ferdinand-Christian and Alice-Sybilla. He married, thirdly, Sabine Margarete Biller (25 June 1941 – 27 June 1996 in Kreuth) on 20 January 1986 in Grünwald. They had no children.
Peter Albert Friedrich Josias Prinz von Sachsen-Coburg und Gotha	12 June 1939; Dresden		Peter Albert married Roswitha Henriette Breuer (1945–2013) on 12 May 1964. They had two sons.

=== Hubertus ===
Hubertus Prinz von Sachsen-Coburg und Gotha (b. 8 December 1961) is the eldest son of Ernst-Leopold and his first wife, Ingeborg Henig. He was born at Herrenberg, West Germany, during the Cold War when part of his family's hereditary lands, located in West Germany, were retained by the Coburgs, while other portions were behind the Iron Curtain. Hubertus lived mostly in Bavaria following his parents' 1963 divorce and raised by his mother. He married Barbara Weissmann (b. Kaiserslautern, 21 May 1959), daughter of Eugen Weissmann and wife Renate Spettel, on 9 March 1993 at Garmisch-Partenkirchen and they were divorced on 12 September 2012 in the same city. They have one son, Sebastian Prinz von Sachsen-Coburg und Gotha born on 16 Jan 1994, who lived with his mother as of 2015. Hubertus administers family properties and lives in Garmisch-Partenkirchen.

== Ancestry ==
Ancestors of Johann Leopold, Hereditary Prince of Saxe-Coburg and Gotha

8. Prince Albert of Saxe-Coburg and Gotha
4. Prince Leopold, Duke of Albany
9. Victoria of the United Kingdom
2. Charles Edward, Duke of Saxe-Coburg and Gotha
10. George Victor, Prince of Waldeck and Pyrmont
5. Princess Helen of Waldeck and Pyrmont
11. Princess Helena of Nassau
1. John Leopold, Hereditary Prince of Saxe-Coburg and Gotha
12. Friedrich, Duke of Schleswig-Holstein-Sonderburg-Glücksburg
6. Friedrich Ferdinand, Duke of Schleswig-Holstein
13. Princess Adelheid of Schaumburg-Lippe
3. Princess Victoria Adelaide of Schleswig-Holstein-Sonderburg-Glücksburg
14. Frederick VIII, Duke of Schleswig-Holstein
7. Princess Karoline Mathilde of Schleswig-Holstein-Sonderburg-Augustenburg
15. Princess Adelheid of Hohenlohe-Langenburg
