= Tolstoy family =

Russian noble family

House of Tolstoy Род Толстых Толстая / Tolstaya (feminine form)
- Noble family
- Arms of the untitled branch of the family
- Country: Russia
- Founded: 14th century (1300s)
- Founder: Andrey Kharitonovich Tolstoy
- Titles: Counts of the Russian Empire (Counts Tolstoy); Okolnichy (former)

The House of Tolstoy, or Tolstoi (Russian: Толстой), is a family of Russian nobility (dvoryanstvo) that acceded to the rank of counts of the Russian Empire. The name Tolstoy is itself derived from the Russian adjective tolstyj (толстый lit. 'thick, stout, fat'). They are the descendants of Andrey Kharitonovich Tolstoy ("the Fat"), who moved from Chernigov to Moscow and served under Vasily II of Moscow in the 15th century. The Tolstoys have left a lasting legacy in Russian politics, military history, literature, and fine arts. The most famous member of the family is the author Leo Tolstoy.

== Origins ==
The Tolstoys claimed their ancestry to a ficitituous Lithuanian nobleman named Indris. As Pyotr Tolstoy stated for the entry into the Velvet Book, Idris had supposedly arrived from the Holy Roman Empire to Chernigov in 1353, the very year when the city became part of Grand Duchy of Lithuania, together with his two sons Litvinos (or Litvonis, "Lithuanian") and Zimonten (or Zigmont, or "Samogitian") and a druzhina of 3000 men. Litvonis and Zimonten possibly refer to the two main parts of Lithuania at the time - Samogitia was considered administratively separate from Lithuania Proper (in the narrow sense) for much of history. Indris was then supposedly converted to Eastern Orthodoxy as Leonty and his sons — as Konstantin and Feodor, respectively; adopting religion of the locals was typical of Lithuanian nobility at the time and characteristic of the Lithuanian style of governing. Konstantin's grandson, Andrei Kharitonovich, was nicknamed Tolsty (translated as fat) by Vasily II of Moscow after he moved from Chernigov to Moscow.

Because of the pagan names and the fact that Chernigov at the time was ruled by Demetrius I Starshy some research concluded that they were Lithuanians who arrived from the Grand Duchy of Lithuania, then in conflict with the State of the Teutonic Order. At the same time, no mention of Indris was ever found in the 14-16th century documents, while the Chernigov Chronicles used by Pyotr Tolstoy as a reference were lost. The first documented members of the Tolstoy family also lived in the 17th century. House of Durnovo is a side branch of the Tolstoy family. Pyotr Tolstoy is the founder of the titled branch of the family; he was granted the title of count by Peter the Great.

The untitled branch of the same stem is descended from Ivan Andreevich Tolstoy. Their common ancestor was Andrey Vasilievich Tolstoy, who married Stepanida Andreevna Miloslavskaya, a cousin of the tsarina. This marriage had allowed the average dvoryanstvo family to enter the Moscow court.

The Tolstoy surname is also found amongst untitled provincial dvoryanstvo.

== In the Napoleonic Wars ==
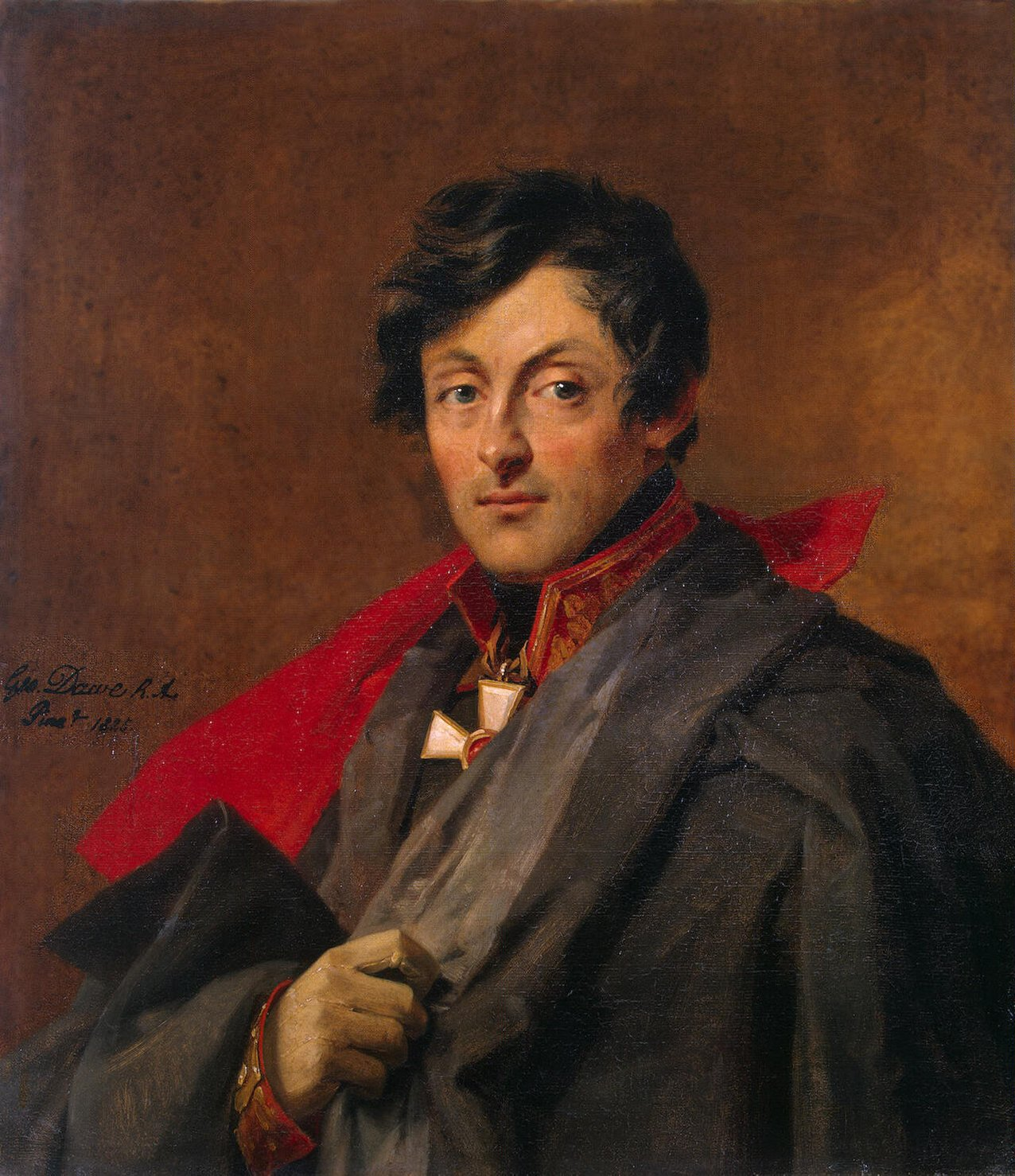
Count Alexander Ivanovich Ostermann-Tolstoy (1770–1857)

Three members of the family were active during the Napoleonic Wars. Count Pyotr Aleksandrovich Tolstoy (1761–1844) served under Suvorov in wars against Poland and the Ottoman Empire, was made a general-adjutant in 1797, went as an ambassador to Paris in 1807 and tried to persuade Alexander I to prepare for the war against France, without much success though. He served as the governor of St Petersburg and Kronstadt from 1828 until his death.

Alexander Ivanovich Tolstoy (1770–1857), stemming from a collateral branch of the family, inherited the comital title and estates of his childless uncle, the last of the Ostermanns.

He first distinguished himself in the Battle of Czarnowo on the night and following morning of 23–24 December 1806, where under his command the 2nd Division of the Russian Army in Poland held out for fifteen hours against the whole army commanded by Napoleon. One of the most admired generals of the anti-Napoleonic coalition, he was rewarded for his courage in the battles at Pultusk and Eylau. At Guttstadt he was wounded so seriously that they feared for his life. In the great battle of Borodino he brilliantly commanded the key positions until he was shell-shocked and taken away from the battlefield. Ostermann-Tolstoy was once again wounded in the battle of Bautzen (1813) but did not give up command of his force. His crowning achievement was the victory at Kulm (August 30, 1813), which cost him amputation of the left arm. When the war was over, he quarreled with the Emperor, resigned and spent the rest of his life in Europe.

Count Nikolai Ilyich Tolstoy (1794—1837), father to Leo Tolstoy, was also active during the Napoleonic Wars as a cavalry officer. He served in the battles of Lützen, Bautzen, Dresden and Leipzig before retiring as a Lieutenant colonel.

== In high society ==
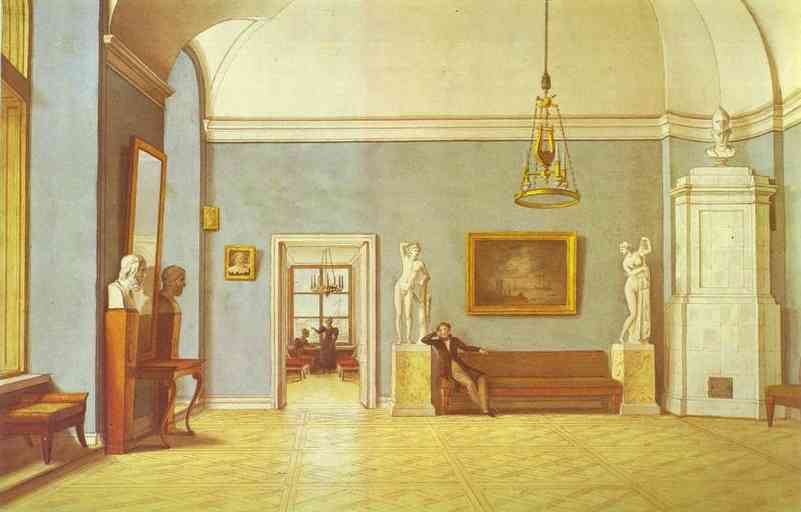
Feodor Tolstoy's watercolour of his house in Moscow

Count Feodor Petrovich Tolstoy (1783–1873), sympathetically mentioned by Pushkin in Eugene Onegin, was one of the most fashionable Russian drawers and painters of the 1820s. Although he prepared fine illustrations for Bogdanovich's Dushenka, his genuine vocation was wax modeling and the design of medals. As he gradually went blind he had to give up drawing and started writing ballets and librettos for operas. He was appointed Vice-President of the Academy of Arts in 1828. Many of his works may be seen in the Russian Museum, St Petersburg.

Count Fyodor Ivanovich Tolstoy (1782–1846) was a notorious drunkard, gastronome, and duellist. It is said that he killed 11 people in duels. In 1803 he participated in the first Russian circumnavigation of the Earth. After he had his body tattooed at the Marquesas and debauched all the crew, captain Krusenstern had to maroon him on the Aleutian Islands near Kamchatka. When he returned to St Petersburg, Count Fedor was nicknamed Amerikanets ("the American"). He fought bravely in the Patriotic War of 1812 but scandalized his family again by marrying a Gypsy singer in 1821. Alexander Griboyedov satirized him in Woe from Wit, and his cousin Leo Tolstoy — who called him an "extraordinary, criminal, and attractive man" — fictionalized him as Dolokhov in War and Peace.

== In Russian literature ==
Many of the Tolstoys devoted their spare time to literary pursuits. For instance, Count Alexei Konstantinovich (1817–75) was a courtier but also one of the most popular Russian poets of his time. He wrote admirable ballads, a historical novel, some licentious verse, and satires published under the penname of Kozma Prutkov. His lasting contribution to the Russian literature was a trilogy of historical dramas, modelled after Pushkin's Boris Godunov.

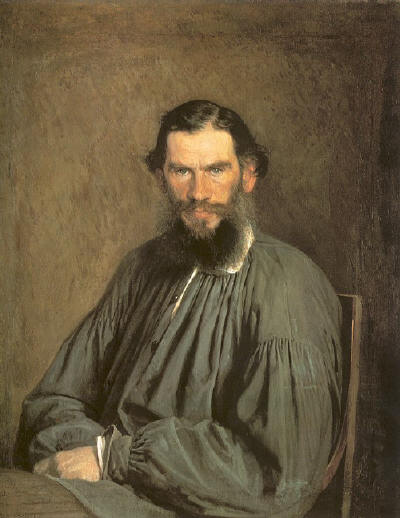
Kramskoy's portrait of Leo Tolstoy (1873)

Count Lev Nikolaevich (1828–1910), more widely known abroad as Leo Tolstoy, is acclaimed as one of the greatest novelists of all time. After he started his career in the military, he was first drawn to writing books when he served in Chechenya, and already his first story, Detstvo ("Childhood"), was something quite unlike anything written before him. It was in his family estate Yasnaya Polyana near Tula that he created two novels, War and Peace and Anna Karenina, that are widely acclaimed as among the best novels ever written. Later he developed a kind of non-traditional Christian philosophy, described in his work The Kingdom of God is Within You which inspired Rainer Maria Rilke and Mohandas Gandhi, then a young lawyer, whose influence extended to Martin Luther King Jr. and James Bevel.

Of Lev's thirteen children, most spent their life either promoting his teachings or denouncing them. His youngest daughter and secretary, Alexandra Lvovna (1884–1979), had a particularly troubled life. Although she shared with her father the doctrine of nonviolence, she felt it was her duty to take part in the events of World War I.

Count Aleksey Nikolayevich Tolstoy (1883–1945) belonged to a different branch of the family. His early short stories, published in 1910s, were panned by critics for excessive naturalism and wanton eroticism. After the Revolution he briefly emigrated to Germany, but then changed his political views and returned to the Soviet Union. His science fiction novels Aelita (1923), about a journey to Mars, and The Garin Death Ray (1927) are still popular with readers. In his later years he published two lengthy novels on historical subjects, Peter the First (1929–45) and The Road to Calvary (1922-41). As a staunch supporter of Joseph Stalin, he became known as "Red Count" or "Comrade Count" and his works were acknowledged as classics of Soviet literature. Most of his reputation declined with that of Socialist Realism, but his children's tale character Buratino retains his strong legacy with the younger audience of Russia and across the former Soviet space, appearing as popular reading, a movie, and a variety of derivative forms.

His granddaughter Tatyana Tolstaya (born May 3, 1951) is one of the foremost Russian short story writers. Another member of the family is Count Nikolai Tolstoy-Miloslavsky (born in 1935), a British historian and monarchist, and nominal head of the House of Tolstoy today.

== After the Russian Revolution ==
Some of the members of the Tolstoy family left Russia in the aftermath of the Russian Revolution and the subsequent establishment of the Soviet Union, and many of Leo Tolstoy's relatives and descendants today live in Sweden, Germany, the United Kingdom, France and the United States. Leo Tolstoy's last surviving grandchild, Countess Tatiana Tolstoy-Paus, died in 2007 at Herresta manor in Sweden, which is owned by Leo Tolstoy's descendants in the Paus family. Two of Leo Tolstoy's great-great-grandsons are Pyotr Tolstoy, a Russian TV presenter and State Duma deputy since 2016 and Vladimir Tolstoy, journalist and adviser to the President of Russia on culture.

== Notable people ==
Coat of arms of the comital branch of the family

- Ivan Andreyevich Tolstoy (1644–1713),
- Pyotr Andreyevich Tolstoy (1645–1729),
- Ivan Matveyevich Tolstoy (1746–1808),
- Pyotr Aleksandrovich Tolstoy (1769–1844), military commander and diplomat
- Aleksander Ivanovich Ostermann-Tolstoy (1770–1857), full general of infantry
- Fyodor Petrovich Tolstoy (1783–1873), artist
- Fyodor Ivanovich Tolstoy (The American) (1782–1846), adventurer
- Nikolai Ilyich Tolstoy (1794—1837), military officer and father of Leo Tolstoy
- Yegor Petrovich Tolstoy (1802–1874), lieutenant-general, governor of Taganrog and Kaluga, senator
- Ivan Matveyevich Tolstoy (1806–1867), grand master of court ceremonies and minister of post service
- Feofil Matveyevich Tolstoy (1809–1881), music critic and composer
- Alexandra Andreevna Tolstaya (1817-1904), lady-in-waiting, and tutor of Princess Maria Maximilianovna of Leuchtenberg and Grand Duchess Maria Alexandrovna of Russia.
- Aleksey Konstantinovich Tolstoy (1817–1875), poet
- Dmitry Andreyevich Tolstoy (1823–1889), statesman
- Leo (Lev) Nikolayevich Tolstoy (1828–1910), writer and philosopher
- Sophia Andreyevna Tolstaya (1844–1919), Leo Tolstoy's wife
- Ivan Ivanovich Tolstoy (1858-1916), Imperial Russian politician
- Tatyana Sukhotina-Tolstaya (1864–1950), Leo Tolstoy's oldest daughter
- Ilya Tolstoy (1866–1933), son of Leo Tolstoy, writer and memoirist
- Nicholas Tolstoy (1867–1938), Russian Catholic priest and theologian.
- Lev Lvovich Tolstoy (1871–1945), son of Leo Tolstoy, sculptor
- Ivan Ivanovich Tolstoy (1880–1954), philologist and academician
- Aleksey Nikolayevich Tolstoy (1883–1945), writer
- Alexandra Lvovna Tolstaya (1884–1979), philanthropist
- Vera Tolstoy (1903–1999), Leo Tolstoy's granddaughter, émigré and broadcaster
- Tatiana Tolstoy-Paus (1914–2007), Swedish socialite and politician
- Georgy Tolstoy (1927–2025), legal scholar
- Nikolai Tolstoy (born 1935), historian
- Tatyana Nikitishna Tolstaya (born 1951), granddaughter of Aleksey Nikolayevich Tolstoy, writer
- Vladimir Tolstoy, journalist, Leo Tolstoy museum director and adviser to the President of Russia on culture (since 2012)
- Artemy Lebedev (born 1975), Russian designer and top blogger, son of Tatyana Tolstaya
- Pyotr Tolstoy (born 1969), Leo Tolstoy's great-great-grandson, Russian journalist, TV presenter and politician
- Fyokla Tolstaya (born 1971), Leo Tolstoy's great-great-granddaughter, Russian journalist and TV presenter
- Svetlana Tolstaya (born 1971), race walker
- Viktoria Tolstoy (née Kjellberg; born 1974), Swedish jazz singer
- Alexandra Tolstoy (born 1974), equine adventurer, author
