= Nikolai Ilyich Tolstoy =

19th-century Russian army officer and Leo Tolstoy's father

Count Nikolai Ilyich Tolstoy
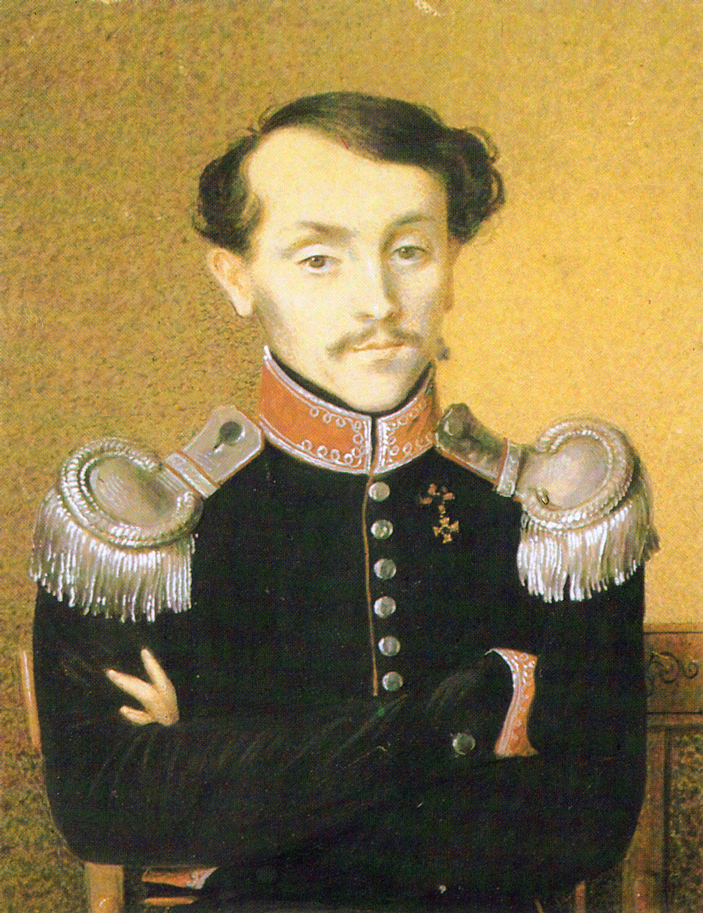
- Born: 26 June 1794
- Died: 21 June 1837 (aged 42); Tula, Tula Governorate, Russian Empire
- Relatives: Leo Tolstoy (son); House of Tolstoy
- Military career
- Allegiance: Russian Empire
- Branch: Imperial Russian Army
- Service years: 1812–1819
- Rank: Lieutenant colonel
- Units: Moscow Hussar Regiment; 1st Guards Cavalry Division
- Conflicts: Napoleonic Wars; French invasion of Russia; War of the Sixth Coalition; German campaign; Battle of Lützen; Battle of Bautzen; Battle of Dresden; Battle of Leipzig
- Awards: Order of St. Vladimir

Count Nikolai Ilyich Tolstoy (26 June 1794 – 21 June 1837) was a Russian nobleman, army officer, and civil servant who fought in the Napoleonic Wars. He was the father of author Leo Tolstoy.

== Early life ==
Nikolai Ilyich Tolstoy was born to the noble Tolstoy family, the eldest of two sons to Ilya Andreyevich Tolstoy (1757–1820), Governor of Kazan, and Princess Pelageya Nikolayevna Gorchakova. His younger brother died before Nikolai was an adult.

In his youth he was described as being of medium height, well-built and physically active, with a preference for the casual, non-employed lifestyle of the landed gentry. At 16 he was introduced by his parents to a young female serf, with whom he had one child– a boy named Mishenka. Mishenka, who was supported economically by his father until the latter's death, was therefore the elder, half-brother to Lev (Leo) Tolstoy.

In 1812, a 17-year-old Nikolai joined the Imperial Russian Army. Much to the dismay of his parents, his commissioning was just in time for the French invasion of Russia.

== Military service ==
Nikolai first became a cornet in the 3rd Ukrainian Cossack Regiment – a levée en masse local cavalry formation – before transferring to the Moscow Hussar Regiment in July. The next year he fought in the battles of Lützen, Bautzen, Dresden, and Leipzig during the German campaign, and was promoted initially to Lieutenant and then to Rittmaster, equivalent to Shtabs-kapitan (Staff captain). The young officer, only 18, was also awarded the Order of St. Vladimir for his service.

He was later captured by French forces while serving as a courier running important messages for the War Ministry, and spent several months as a prisoner of war in French custody. He was rescued following the Coalition victory in the Battle of Paris, and was subsequently assigned adjutant to Prince Andrei Gorchakov, a corps commander.

Nikolai Ilyich was transferred to a new regiment, the “Prince of Orange Hussars,” on 11 December 1817, with the rank of Major. Eventually thereafter on 14 March 1819 he would be discharged from army service, departing with the rank of Lieutenant colonel and citing illness.

== Marriage, fatherhood, and later years ==
After his army career concluded, Nikolai returned to the Kazan Governorate. His father, who had been governor for over two decades, allocated Nikolai a job in the civil service; this stability, however, would be short-lived. His father died only a year later, in 1820, leaving Nikolai a debt so large he refused inheritance outright.

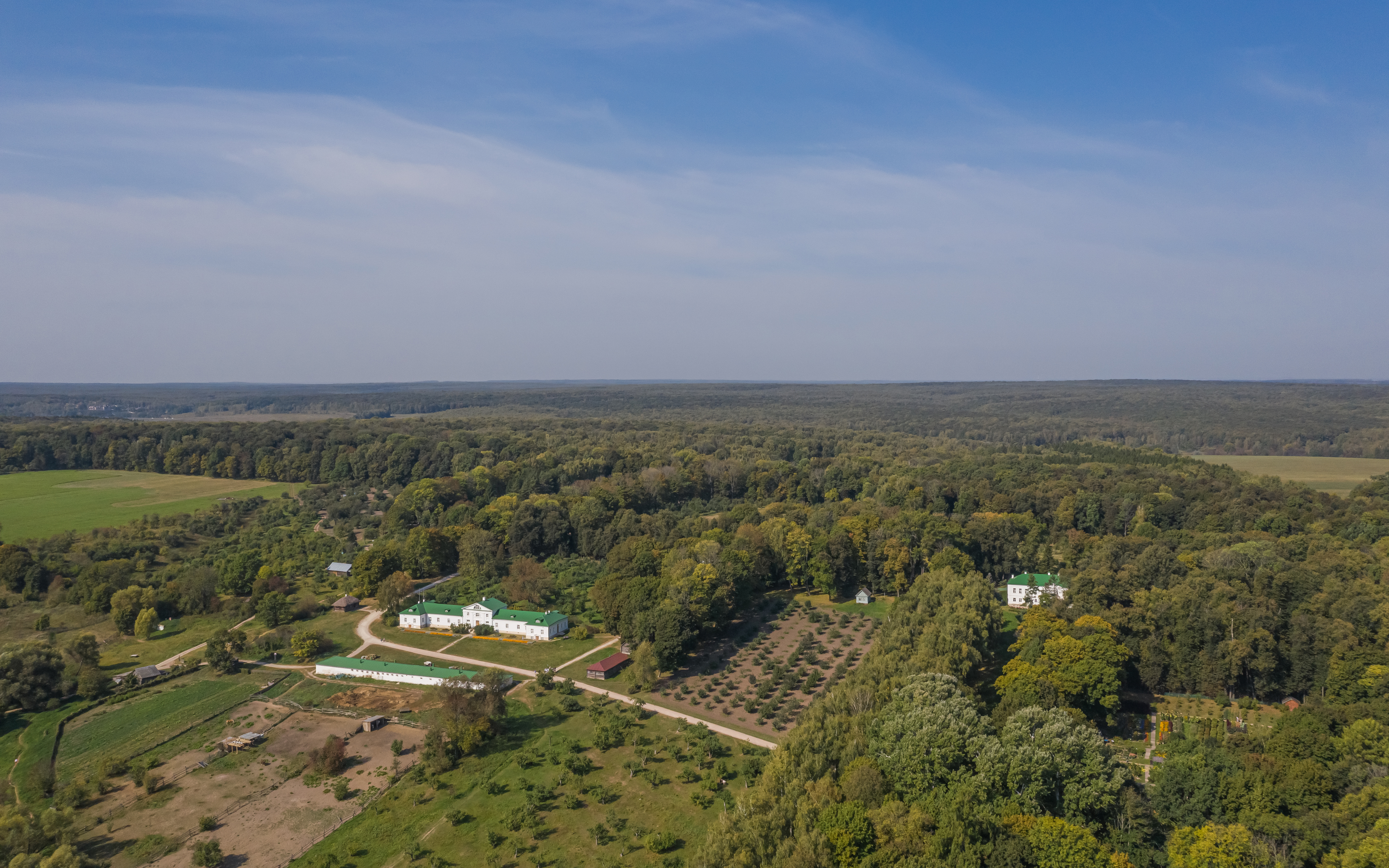
An aerial view of the Yasnaya Polyana estate, which Nikolai lived at with his family

Now without property and wealth, Nikolai soon managed to find a well-off suitor to alleviate the burden: Princess Mariya Nikolayevna Volkonskaya. The age difference between the two was around four years– Mariya being near 32 and Nikolai near 28. Nonetheless, by marriage he assumed control over some 800 serfs, the fruits of their labor, and the now-famous property at Yasnaya Polyana. On these grounds he worked extensively on agriculture and, to the best of Lev Tolstoy's knowledge, never utilized corporal punishment on the serfs, except for one unspecified instance.

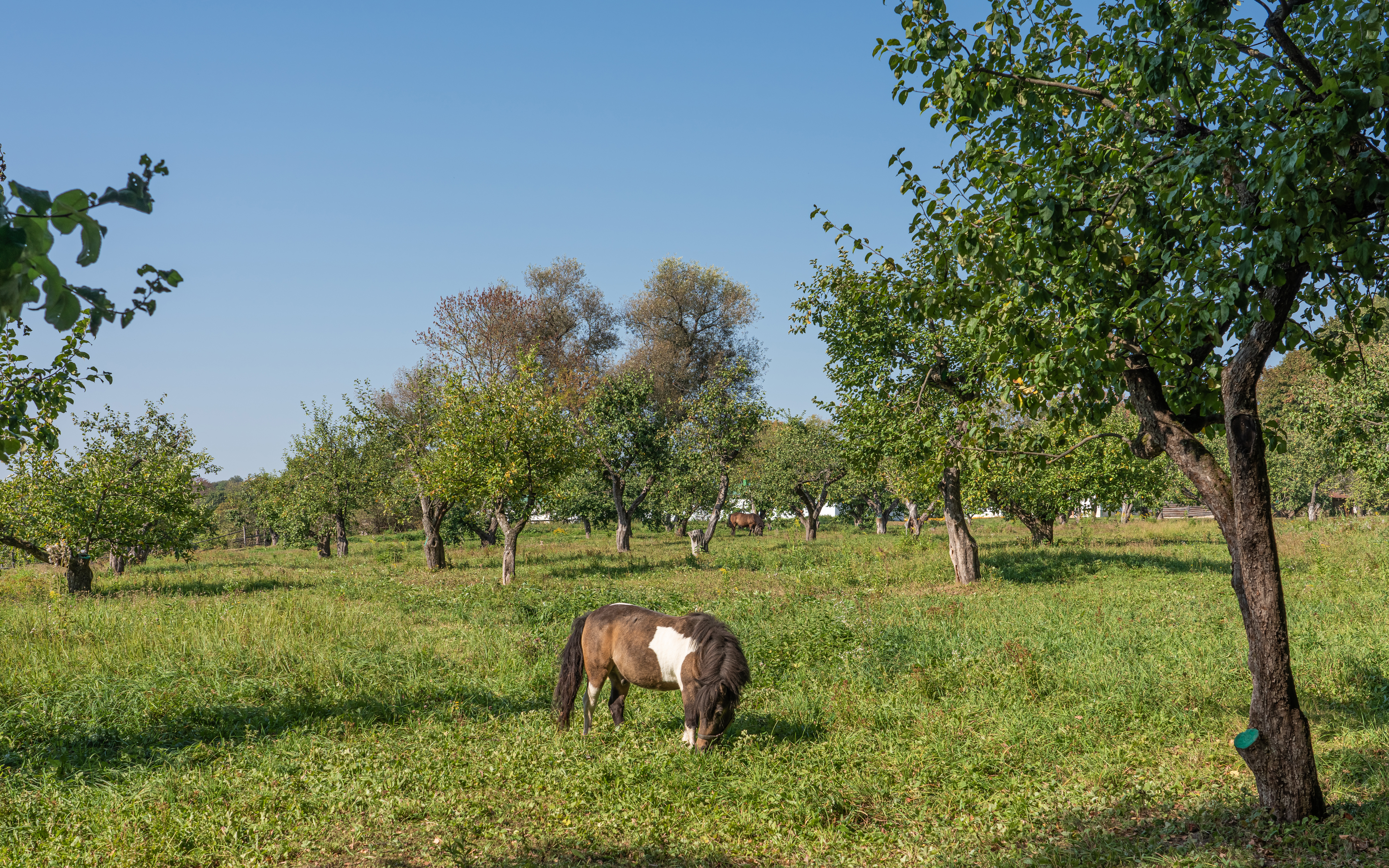
The estate's orchard, an example of the environment Nikolai hunted near

Nikolai and Mariya had five children together: Nikolai (Jr) (born 1823), Sergei (born 1826), Dmitri (born 1827), Lev (born 1828), and Maria (born 1830).

Nikolai spent much of his time at the estate hunting, reading, and outfitting a personal library– he specifically enjoyed French literature, the language of which he and his wife could both speak. He was remembered endearingly by Lev in the novel Childhood, which purports that he drew pictures for his children and was an avid joker, yet with an extreme kindness and humility.

Nikolai Ilyich Tolstoy died in Tula on 21 June 1837, when his son Lev was only nine years old. Nikolai's death would send the latter into a sort of spiral, causing the young boy to examine deeply the meaning of life, which would be a topic throughout his future writing career. Nikolai would be immortalized in his son's book, War and Peace, by serving as the inspiration for the character Nikolai Ilyich Rostov.
