= Alexandra Andreevna Tolstaya =

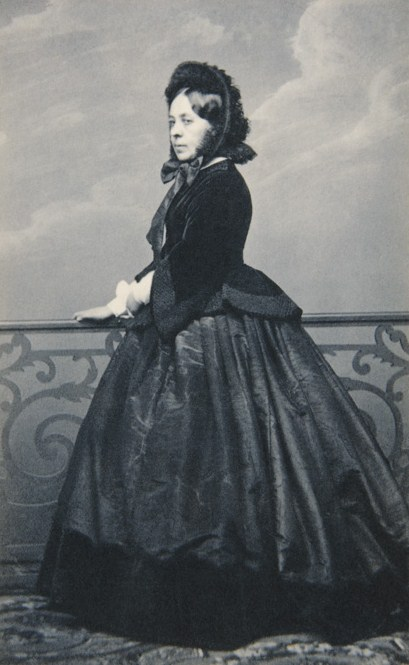
- Born: 29 July [O.S. 17 July] 1817
- Died: 13 April [O.S. 31 March] 1904 (aged 86); Saint Petersburg
- Noble family: Tolstoy
- Father: Andrei Andreevich Tolstoy
- Mother: Praskovia Vasilievna Barykova
- Occupation: Memoirist; Philanthropist

Countess Alexandra Andreevna Tolstaya (29 July O.S. [17 July] 1817 – 13 April [O.S. 31 March] 1904, Saint Petersburg) was a maid of honour in the Russian imperial court, a tutor of the royal children, and a cavalry lady of the Order of Saint Catherine. She was a great-aunt and close friend of Leo Tolstoy.

== Biography ==
Alexandra is believed to have been born in Moscow to Count Andrei Andreevich Tolstoy (1771–1844) and Praskovia Vasilievna (née Barykova; 1796–1879). She had two brothers, Ilya (1813–1879) and Vasily (1813–1841), who devoted themselves to the military, and two sisters, Elizaveta (1815–1867) and Sophia (1824–1895), who like herself would remain unmarried. They were brought up by their mother and her cousin Praskovya Stepanovna Barykova (1805–1844).

Alexandra and Elizaveta entered the court as ladies-in-waiting to Grand Duchess Maria Nikolaevna. In 1846, Alexandra became the tutor of Princess Maria Maximilianovna.

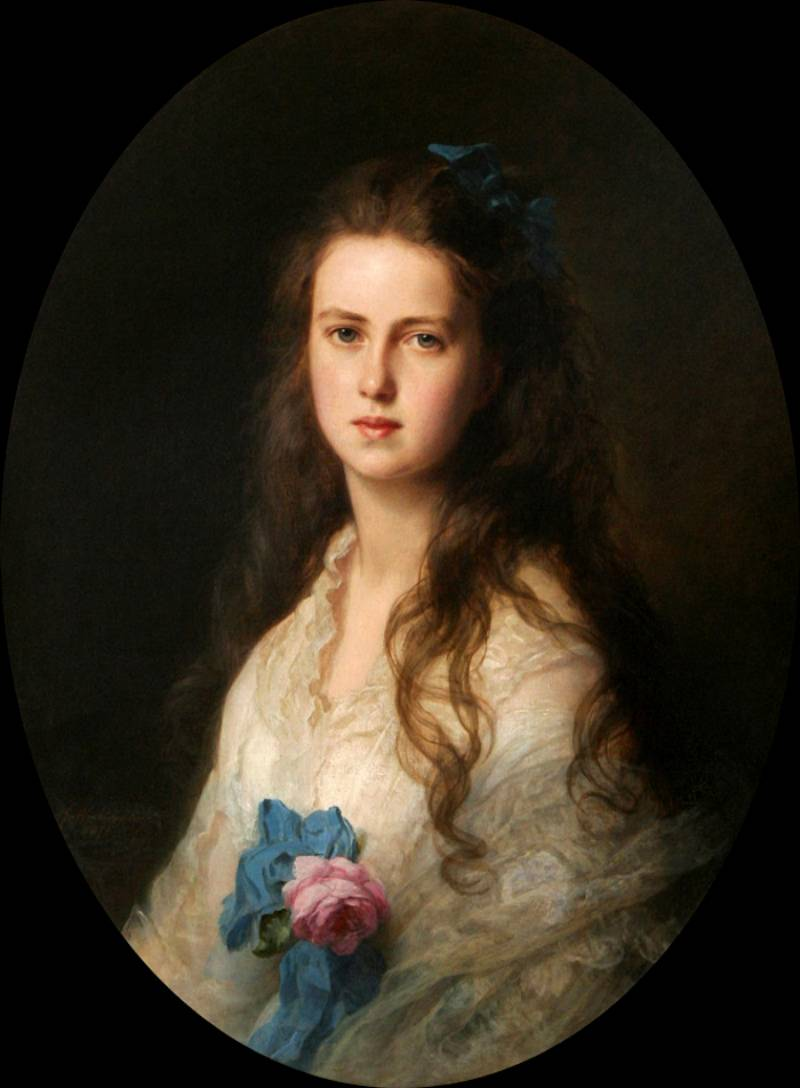
Grand Duchess Maria Alexandrovna of Russia age 18 by Franz Xaver Winterhalter.

Alexandra's pedagogy and skill was appreciated at the court, and in 1866 she was invited by Empress Maria Alexandrovna to raise Grand Duchess Maria Alexandrovna, the only daughter of Alexander II. She held this position until the Grand Duchess' marriage in 1874 to Alfred, Duke of Saxe-Coburg and Gotha. As a token of gratitude, she was awarded the Order of Saint Catherine, the highest award for court ladies. Upon the death of Alexander II, he bequeathed her a portrait of the Grand Duchess at age 18.

After 1881, Alexandra Andreevna occupied rooms on the mezzanine of the South Pavilion of the Small Hermatige. She died there at the age of 86 from acute bronchitis. She was buried in a church on Konyushennaya Square in the presence of the Grand Dukes and the Empress, at the request of whom a monument was erected at the expense of the royal court.

== Relationship with Leo Tolstoy ==
Alexandra met Leo Tolstoy in the spring of 1857 whilst she was in Switzerland with the 'small court' of Grand Duchess Maria Nikolaevna. Tolstoy confessed in his diary that he would have been ready to fall in love with her except for their age difference. Alexandra, whom he jokingly referred to as 'grandmother' in his letters, was 11 years older than him.

They began a long-term friendship. Due to her residing in the capital, the two did not see each other often, but nevertheless she became a friend and mentor to the writer. Together they contributed to causes such as aiding the starving during a drought and intervened on behalf of the Doukhobors, who as a people were being persecuted for their beliefs.

When Tolstoy expressed interest in the fate of the decembrists, she directed him to Vasily Perovsky, whom she loved throughout her life. The writer used many of Perovsky's memories in his works. He also utilized Alexandra's correspondence to inform his writings about life in the capital, including events at court and in the salons. In Tolstoy's last novel Resurrection, Alexandra served as a prototype for the character of Aline, the organizer of the Magdalen shelter.

Alexandra developed a close relationship with Sophia Tolstaya and was godmother of the Tolstoys' youngest daughter, Alexandra, who was named in her honour.

Alexandra was deeply religious, a topic which came up often in her correspondence with Tolstoy, who was regarded as a Christian anarchist. She repeatedly made attempts to 'convert' him to orthodoxy that were received coldly. Their letters were published in 1911 by the Society of the Tolstoy Museum in St. Petersburg after the death of both addressees, as per the will of Alexandra Andreevna, who prepared the correspondence for publication.
