= Nicholas Tolstoy =

Russian priest

Nicholas Tolstoy (20 February 1867 – 4 February 1938) was the first Russian Orthodox priest to solicit a union with Catholic Church in 1893. Tolstoy is best known for his inauguration of a small Russian Catholic community, and was responsible for its development.

== Early life and education ==
Father Tolstoy was born into a branch of the aristocratic Tolstoy family in Saint Petersburg, Russia. He attended the Page Corps military academy, and served in the Sofia Regiment after graduating. Soon after, he entered the Moscow Theological Academy and studied the writings of the Fathers of the Church in Russian and "Summa Theologica" by Saint Thomas Aquinas in Latin. In his time at the academy, Tolstoy met philosopher Vladimir Solovyov and the crypto-catholic Elizabeth Volkonskaya, and was impressed by the penetration of Protestant views in the teaching of Orthodox theology.

In 1890 Tolstoy was ordained an Orthodox priest, and in the following year took a trip to the Middle East to become familiar with the traditions and customs of the Middle Eastern Christians. After the return of the French abbé Vivian of Saint Louis Church in Moscow, the abbé Vivian introduced Tolstoy to Italian cardinal Vincenzo Vannutelli, who after talking with Tolstoy told him that with his views, he can consider himself a Catholic while staying in the home of the Russian Orthodox Church.

Tolstoy traveled around the world, taking with him marching corporal and remembering in the cities of following local bishops. In Vienna, Tolstoy first visited the Ukrainian Greek Catholic Church and met with Metropolitan Sylvester Sembratovich. After returning to Moscow, Tolstoy wrote his thesis on the Eucharist under the leadership of Alexey Lebedev. In 1893 he graduated with honors from the Theological Academy, and formally joined the Catholic Church in November 1894.

== Religious Work and Conflict ==
In Moscow, Tolstoy spoke with Russian Orthodox archpriest John of Kronstadt on his Catholic views. Despite being aware of his dissimilar views, the Synod took no action against Tolstoy. After the funeral of Emperor Alexander III, Tolstoy was summoned to the reception and showed Procurator of the Holy Synod, Vladimir Karlovich Sabler, the latest issue of the Catholic journal "Revue Bénédictine", which was published by his private letters to Father Vanutelli.

=== Renunciation ===
Under the threat of repression and confiscation, Tolstoy was demanded renunciation of dignity. Tolstoy went to Rome, where he met with many of the Roman Catholic hierarchy, including Pope Leo XIII, and engaged in a service of the liturgy.

Russian ambassador Alexander Izvolsky called to ban Tolstoy and deliver him to the Russian authorities, however, the Pope refused to meet these demands. After deciding that Nicholas resigned to his emigration, Izvolsky told the Pope that Russia will not pursue disqualifying him by the Synod of dignity of a priest. On 22 April 1895 Tolstoy was able to return to Moscow. Russian Latins were unhappy with his return, and especially his service at what they considered to be the "schismatic" ceremony.

=== Return to Moscow ===
Following his return to Moscow, Tolstoy created a small house church and served the Russian liturgy with the commemoration of the Pope. The patience of the Synod died out when Tolstoy attached to the Catholic Church by the Byzantine rite of Vladimir Solovyov in Lent of 1896, and Cardinal Rampolla sent him to the Augustinian monastery in Paris.

After the coronation of Nicholas II, a manifesto which forgave illegal travel from Russia was issued, and Tolstoy left for Copenhagen, from where he traveled to Finland. Tolstoy returned to Moscow, where he then met his wife and met with the governor. The governor authorized Tolstoy's stay in Moscow with his family for two days, then ordered him and his family to go to live in Nizhny Novgorod. Tolstoy was then arrested and escorted by train to Nizhny Novgorod. In Sergiev Posad, Tolstoy was granted permission to settle in the suburbs. Tolstoy was deprived of inheriting his family's estate, and under public pressure, his wife developed it while Tolstoy worked in the Gethsemane monastery.

== Arrest and Death ==
After the Russian Revolution (1917-1923), Tolstoy worked as a priest in Kiev, then in Odessa until 1928. On 12 December 1937 he was arrested in Kiev.

On 25 January 1938, by order of the Special Meeting of the NKVD, Tolstoy was sentenced to be shot under Articles 52-2 and 54-6 of the Criminal Code of the Ukrainian SSR. Tolstoy was shot and killed on 4 February 1938, at the age of 70.

== See also ==
- Catholic Church
- Russian Orthodox Church
