= Grand Duchess Maria Alexandrovna of Russia =

Duchess of Saxe-Coburg and Gotha from 1893 to 1900

Maria Alexandrovna of Russia
- Duchess of Edinburgh
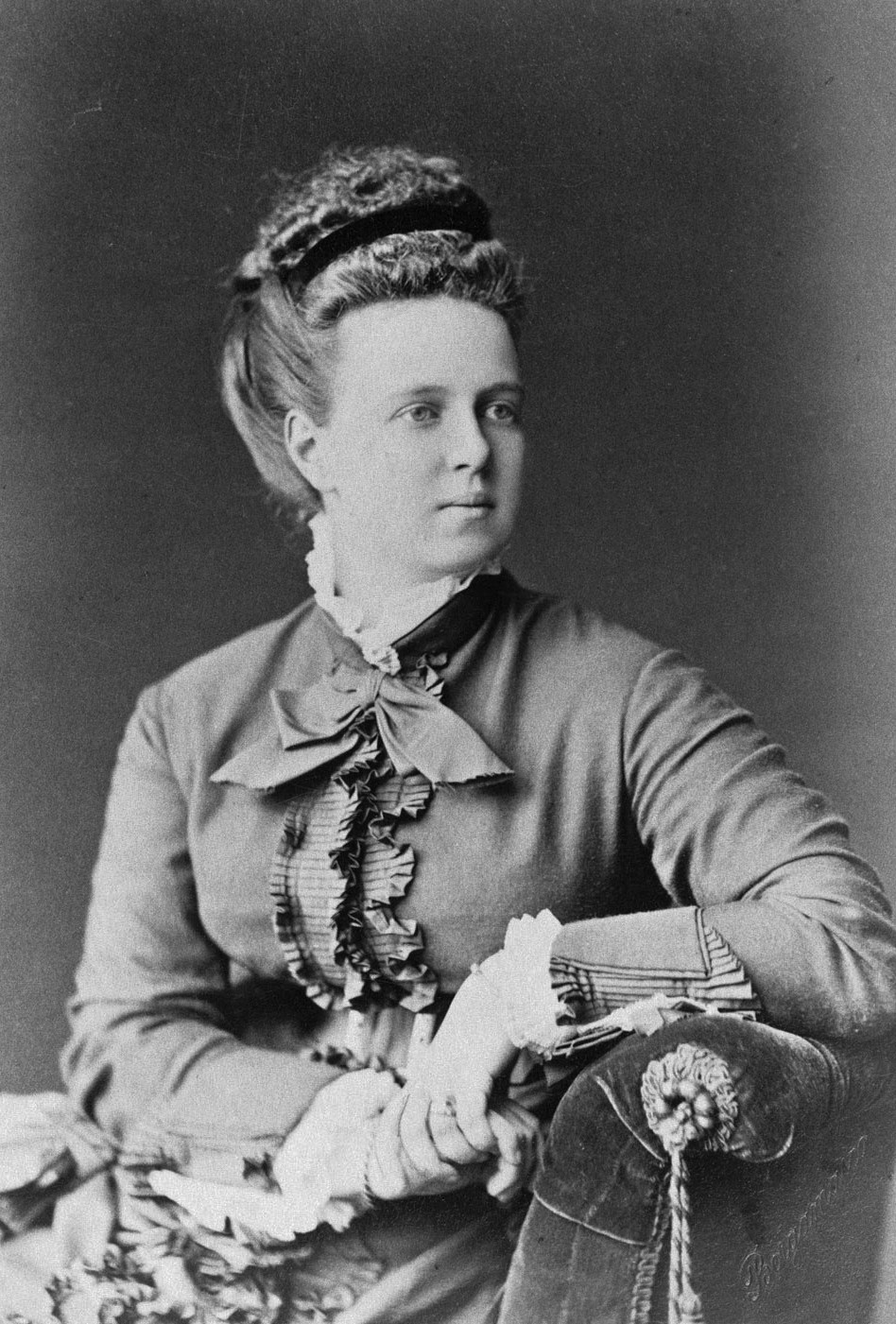

Duchess consort of Saxe-Coburg and Gotha
- Tenure: 22 August 1893 – 30 July 1900
- Born: 17 October [O.S. 5 October] 1853; Alexander Palace, Tsarskoye Selo, Saint Petersburg, Russia
- Died: 22 October 1920 (aged 67); Zürich, Switzerland
- Burial: Friedhof am Glockenberg, Coburg
- Spouse: Alfred, Duke of Saxe-Coburg and Gotha (m. 1874; died 1900)
- Issue: Alfred, Hereditary Prince of Saxe-Coburg and Gotha; Marie, Queen of Romania; Grand Duchess Victoria Feodorovna of Russia; Alexandra, Princess of Hohenlohe-Langenburg; Princess Beatrice, Duchess of Galliera
Names
- Maria Alexandrovna Romanova
- House: Holstein-Gottorp-Romanov
- Father: Alexander II of Russia
- Mother: Marie of Hesse and by Rhine
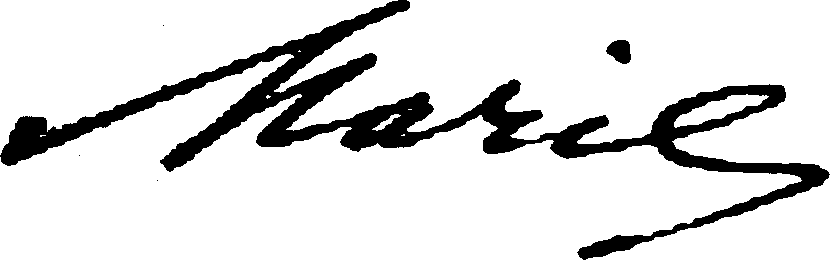
- Signature

Grand Duchess Maria Alexandrovna of Russia (Russian: Мария Александровна, romanized: Mariya Aleksandrovna; 17 October [O.S. 5 October] 1853 – 22 October 1920) was the sixth child and only surviving daughter of Alexander II of Russia and Marie of Hesse and by Rhine; she was Duchess of Edinburgh and later Duchess of Saxe-Coburg and Gotha as the wife of Alfred, Duke of Saxe-Coburg and Gotha. She was the younger sister of Alexander III of Russia and the paternal aunt of Russia's last emperor, Nicholas II.

In 1874, Maria married Prince Alfred, Duke of Edinburgh, the second son of Queen Victoria and Prince Albert of Saxe-Coburg and Gotha; she was the only Romanov to marry into the British royal family. The couple had five children: Alfred, Marie, Victoria Melita, Alexandra, and Beatrice. For the first years of her marriage, Maria lived in England. She neither adapted to the British court nor overcame her dislike for her adopted country. She accompanied her husband on his postings as an admiral of the Royal Navy at Malta (1886–1889) and Devonport (1890–1893). The Duchess of Edinburgh travelled extensively through Europe. She visited her family in Russia frequently and stayed for long periods in England and Germany attending social and family events.

In August 1893, Maria became Duchess of Saxe-Coburg and Gotha when her husband inherited the duchy on the death of his childless uncle, Ernest II, Duke of Saxe-Coburg and Gotha. She enjoyed life in Germany, where she became active in cultural endeavours and charitable work. To her daughters, she gave every support, but she was critical of her wayward son, Alfred, who died in 1899. Her husband died in 1900 and was succeeded as Duke of Saxe-Coburg and Gotha by his nephew Charles Edward.

In her widowhood, Maria continued to live in Coburg. The outbreak of World War I divided her sympathies. She sided with Germany against her native Russia. Many of her relatives, including her brother Paul and her nephew Nicholas II, were killed during the Russian Revolution, and Maria lost her considerable fortune. After World War I, the Duchy of Saxe-Coburg and Gotha ceased to exist in November 1918. Maria died in 1920 while living under reduced circumstances in exile in Switzerland.

== Grand Duchess of Russia ==
=== Early life ===
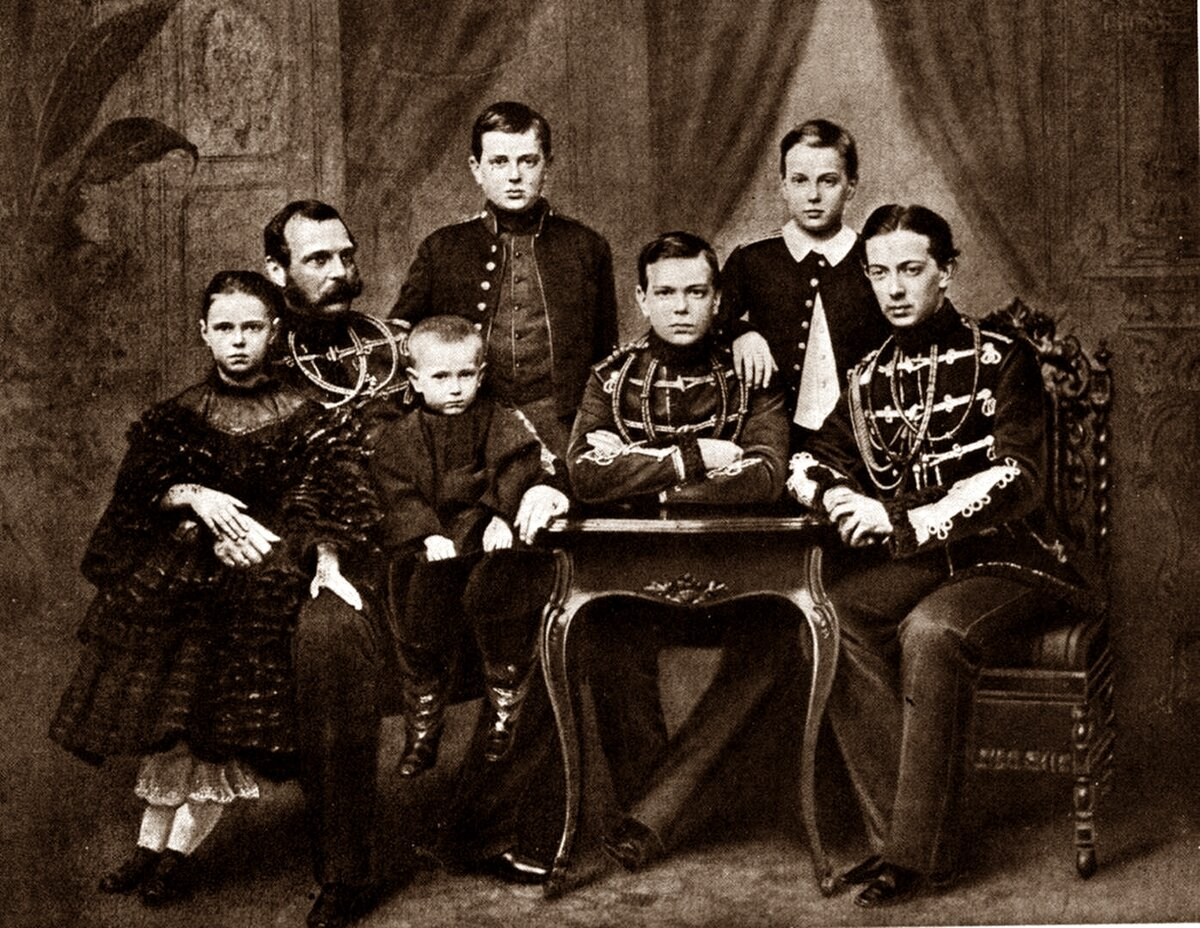
From left to right: Grand Duchess Maria Alexandrovna, Emperor Alexander II with Grand Duke Sergei Alexandrovich in his lap, Grand Duke Vladimir Alexandrovich, Grand Duke Alexander Alexandrovich on the table with his arms crossed, Grand Duke Alexei Alexandrovich and Tsarevich Nicholas Alexandrovich

Grand Duchess Maria Alexandrovna was born on 17 October [O.S. 5 October] 1853 at the Alexander Palace in Tsarskoye Selo. She was the sixth child and only surviving daughter among the eight children of Emperor Alexander II and his first wife, Empress Maria Alexandrovna (née Princess Marie of Hesse and by Rhine). At the time of her birth, her grandfather, Nicholas I, was on the Russian throne and her father was Tsesarevich. In 1855, when Maria was seventeen months old, Nicholas I died and her father became the new Russian emperor. The Grand Duchess grew up as the only girl with four older brothers and two younger ones. She did not know her only sister, Alexandra, who had died before she was born. Maria herself almost died from a throat disease at the age of seven.

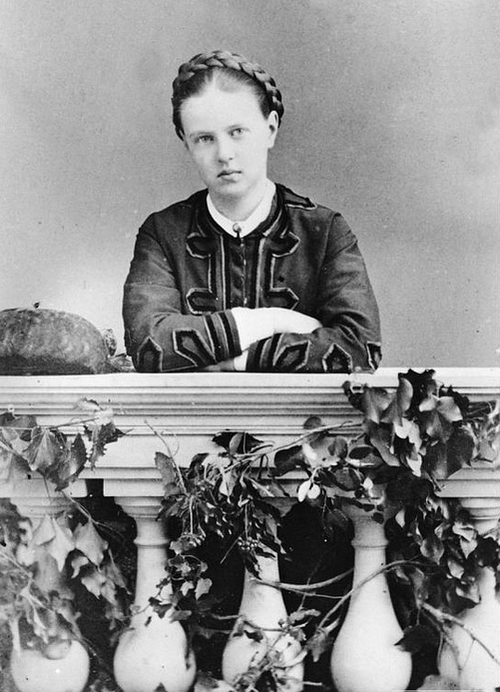
Grand Duchess Maria Alexandrovna in her youth

Maria's childhood was spent in luxury and splendor in the large palaces and country estates owned by the Romanovs. The family's main residence was the sixteen-hundred-room Winter Palace in Saint Petersburg, with another residence at Gatchina, forty miles south. In the summer, the family stayed in Peterhof, a large complex with farms, cottages, and various pavilions on the Gulf of Finland. From the end of the summer until winter, the imperial family moved to Tsarskoye Selo, the imperial town, where the Romanovs had the Catherine Palace and Alexander Palace. In the children's island, located in a pond in the park of the Alexander Palace, Maria had her own private little house, off-limits to adults, which she used with her brothers as a playhouse. Her father added a farm, built for her enjoyment when she was eight years old.

Maria was beloved by her parents. Her governess, Anna Tyutcheva (1829–1889), a daughter of the celebrated poet Fyodor Tyutchev, reflected that "the whole family adores this child" and that her parents "shower her with kisses and affection." Empress Maria felt "boundless adoration" for her only surviving daughter. Alexander II enjoyed spending time with her, and he considered her his favorite child. He told Anna Tyutcheva that "almost every evening I come to feed soup to this little cherub. This is the only enjoyable minute of my whole day, the only time when I forget the troubles that weigh upon me." When she was bored with her studies, she would burst into her father's study and interrupt his meetings with his ministers.

Maria had a close relationship with her brothers. Her governess noted that she "cannot stand when someone reprimands any of her brothers. This brings her to the state of real despair." Empress Maria had weak lungs and had to travel constantly to Germany and southern Europe to escape the harsh Russian winters. She often took her three younger children with her on these trips, so Maria became especially close to her two younger brothers, Sergei and Paul.

Surrounded only by brothers, Maria grew up as a tomboy, with an independent character and a strong will. "She is absolutely genuine and never changes in front of strangers," observed Anna Tyutcheva, adding that: "She is accustomed to be the center of the world and that everyone yields to her." Tyutcheva described her pupil as "stubborn and uncompromising", commenting that "one cannot treat her roughly or reason with her a lot."

=== Education ===
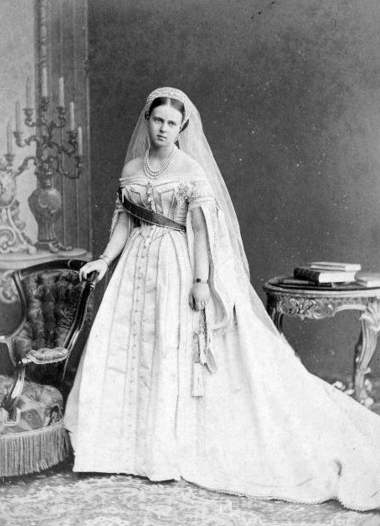
Grand Duchess Maria Alexandrovna wearing the traditional dress of ladies of the Russian Imperial court

Maria was educated at the Russian court under the strict regime of her governess, Countess Alexandra Tolstaya. Maria was the first Russian grand duchess to be raised by English nannies and to speak fluent English. Besides her native Russian, she also became totally proficient in German and French. In August 1867, while the imperial family was at Livadia Palace, in the Crimea, Mark Twain met Maria and her parents. The famous American writer described her as "blue-eyed, unassuming, and pretty". As many contemporaries did, Twain noticed the influence that the young Grand Duchess had over her father.

== Engagement ==
=== Meeting Prince Alfred ===
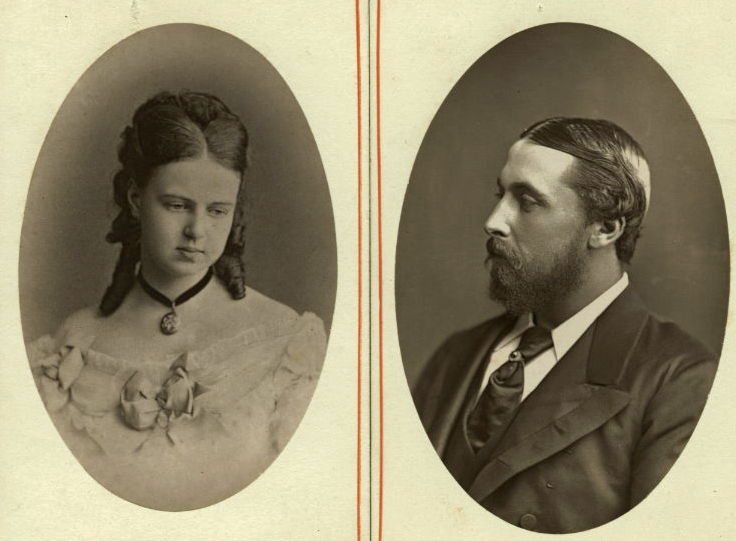
Grand Duchess Maria Alexandrovna and Prince Alfred around the time they met, 1868

During a visit to her maternal relatives, the Princes of Battenberg, at Jugenheim in August 1868, Grand Duchess Maria Alexandrovna, then fourteen years old, met Prince Alfred, Duke of Edinburgh. Alfred, Queen Victoria's second son, was a shy and handsome young man, with a career in the British navy. He was visiting his sister, Princess Alice, who was married to Maria's first cousin. Alfred's voyage around the world with the Royal Navy kept him away, traveling for the next two years. Maria and Prince Alfred saw each other again in the summer 1871, when Alexander II and his wife visited the Battenbergs again at their palace. The Emperor and Empress were accompanied by seventeen-year-old Maria and her two elder brothers. Alfred also happened to be there, along with the Prince and Princess of Wales. During that summer, Maria and Alfred felt attracted to each other, spending their days walking and talking together. They had a common love of music; Alfred was an enthusiastic amateur violinist, while Maria played the piano. Although they wished to marry, no engagement was announced, and Alfred returned to England. Their parents were against the match. Alexander II did not want to lose his daughter, to whom he was deeply attached. He presented his daughter's youth as the main obstacle and suggested a waiting period of at least one year before any definitive decision should be taken. The Emperor also objected to a British son-in-law, due to the general anti-British feeling in Russia following the Crimean War. The Empress regarded British customs as peculiar and the English people as cold and unfriendly. She was convinced that her daughter would not be happy there. However, marriage negotiations began in July 1871, only to be stalled in 1872.

=== Negotiations ===
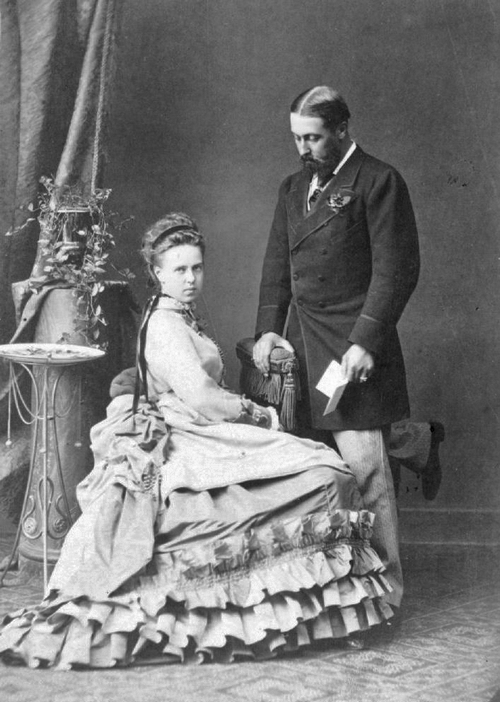
Engagement photograph of Grand Duchess Maria Alexandrovna and Prince Alfred, 1873

Queen Victoria was also against the match. No British prince had ever married a Romanov; she foresaw problems with Maria's Orthodox religion and Russian upbringing. The Queen considered that Russia was generally "unfriendly" towards Britain and she was also suspicious about Russian moves in the direction of India. Victoria was dismayed, therefore, when she heard that official negotiations had restarted in January 1873. There were rumors going about Saint Petersburg that Maria had compromised herself with Prince Nikolai Golitsyn, the Emperor's aide-de-camp, and her family were anxious to see her settled. Alfred refused to believe those rumors and he was prepared to fight to marry the person he loved. Queen Victoria therefore swallowed her pride and said nothing. Both mothers continued to look for other partners for their children, but Alfred and Maria would not have anyone else. Maria liked neither the Prince of Württemberg nor the Prince of Mecklenburg-Strelitz, who were presented to her as alternatives. As the Empress failed to find a German prince acceptable for her daughter, a meeting among Alfred, the Empress and her daughter took place in Sorrento, Italy, in mid-April 1873. The reunion did not go as planned because Maria came down with fever and Alfred could spend only a short time with her. That year, there was an Anglo-Russian dispute over the Afghan border. The Queen's ministers thought that a marriage might help to ease the tension between the two countries, if only by putting the monarchs into closer contact with one another.

In June 1873, Alexander II joined his wife and daughter at Ems, and Alfred was invited to meet them at Jugenheim. Alfred arrived in early July. On 11 July, he asked for Maria's hand and she accepted him. He was nearly twenty-nine; she was nineteen. He sent a telegram from Germany back to his mother: "Maria and I were engaged this morning. Cannot say how happy I am. Hope your blessing rests on us." The Queen sent her congratulations, but confined her misgivings to her diary on 11 July 1873: "Not knowing Marie, and realizing that there may still be many difficulties, my thoughts and feelings are rather mixed." When breaking the news to her eldest daughter, Crown Princess Victoria of Prussia, Queen Victoria simply said: "The murder is out."

=== Dowry ===
Emperor Alexander II provided his daughter Maria with a substantial financial settlement. Contemporary newspaper reports in London provided a detailed overview of the provisions in the marriage treaty between Great Britain and Russia, which addressed the couple's financial arrangements. According to The Times, Maria would receive the following:

- 1,000,000 roubles (approximately £150,000), as fixed by the fundamental laws of the Russian Empire for the daughters of emperors. The capital was to remain deposited in Russia with the Department of Appanages, paying an income of 5% (50,000 roubles, or about £7,500);
- An additional 75,000 roubles (approximately £11,300) per annum, as a mark of the Emperor's “particular affection, which is not to be considered a precedent for the future”;
- A special marriage portion of 1,000,000 roubles (£150,000), with the capital also remaining in Russia, paying an income of 5% annually (50,000 roubles, or about £7,500, paid half-yearly); and
- Maria was also to retain control of her private capital of 600,000 roubles (£90,000).

The annual income from the first three provisions amounted to 175,000 roubles (approximately £26,500), exclusive of Maria's private fortune of 600,000 roubles (£90,000), although fluctuations in the rates of currency exchange rendered 175,000 roubles as being worth approximately £17,500 during the early decades of the 20th century. The treaty also specified that Maria was at liberty to make any contribution to the couple's household expenses as she pleased, but that the debts and obligations of their household would not be common to them both. If Maria outlived Alfred, she would receive an annuity of £6,000 from the British Civil List.

If Maria predeceased Alfred leaving children, her marriage portion and private fortune would be appropriated for their benefit. If she predeceased him without children, Alfred would receive a lump sum of 250,000 roubles (£38,000) from the 'ordinary' marriage settlement, and would enjoy from the remaining portion of the ordinary settlement during his lifetime, after which it would revert to the Emperor of Russia. The “special” marriage portion would revert to the Emperor immediately if there were no children.

Prince Alfred had previously been granted an annuity of £15,000 from the British Civil list in 1866, which was increased by £10,000 to £25,000 on the occasion of his marriage. Consequently the couple's income at the time of their marriage was approximately £51,500 annually, exclusive of Maria's private 600,000-rouble fortune.

Emperor Alexander II also bestowed on his only daughter some of the best jewels owned by the Romanovs, including the sapphires he had inherited from his mother, Empress Alexandra Feodorovna (née Princess Charlotte of Prussia) and a parure that had belonged to Catherine the Great. As a wedding present, the Emperor commissioned a complete parure of diamonds and Burmese rubies from the court jeweller Bolin. Her other pieces of jewellery included a kokoshnik made of diamonds, which could also be worn as a necklace. George Greville, 4th Earl of Warwick later recalled that "I saw the finest jewels I have ever seen in my life" when he visited Maria's home in Eastwell and that "One would have thought that the world had been ransacked to lay these treasures at the Duchess’s feet, and there seemed to be enough for an entire royal family rather than for one member of it.” Alexander II gave Maria an extravagant trousseau that cost £40,000. It included "50 magnificent dresses, not including ball-dresses, to say nothing of the splendid furs and lace at 1,000 roubles a yard." He made Alfred honorary colonel of a Russian guards regiment and even named a Russian battleship after him – the Gerzog Edinburgsky.

A week after the engagement, the proposed Anglo-Russian alliance experienced its first crisis. Queen Victoria asked the Emperor to bring Maria to Scotland, so that she could meet her future daughter-in-law. Alexander II refused. The Empress suggested that they all meet in Cologne, instead. Victoria called it "simply impertinent" that "I ... who have been nearly twenty years longer on the throne than the Emperor of Russia ... and who am a Reigning Sovereign ... should be ready to run to the slightest call of the mighty Russians ... like any little Princess." Victoria also made herself unpopular by refusing the Emperor's offer to make the Prince of Wales colonel of a Russian regiment, and by demanding that an Anglican marriage service be held in Saint Petersburg alongside the Orthodox ceremony. But Maria looked forward happily to her marriage: "How happy I am to belong to him. I feel that my love for him is growing daily. I have a feeling of peace and inexpressible happiness and a boundless impatience to be altogether his own."

== Marriage ==
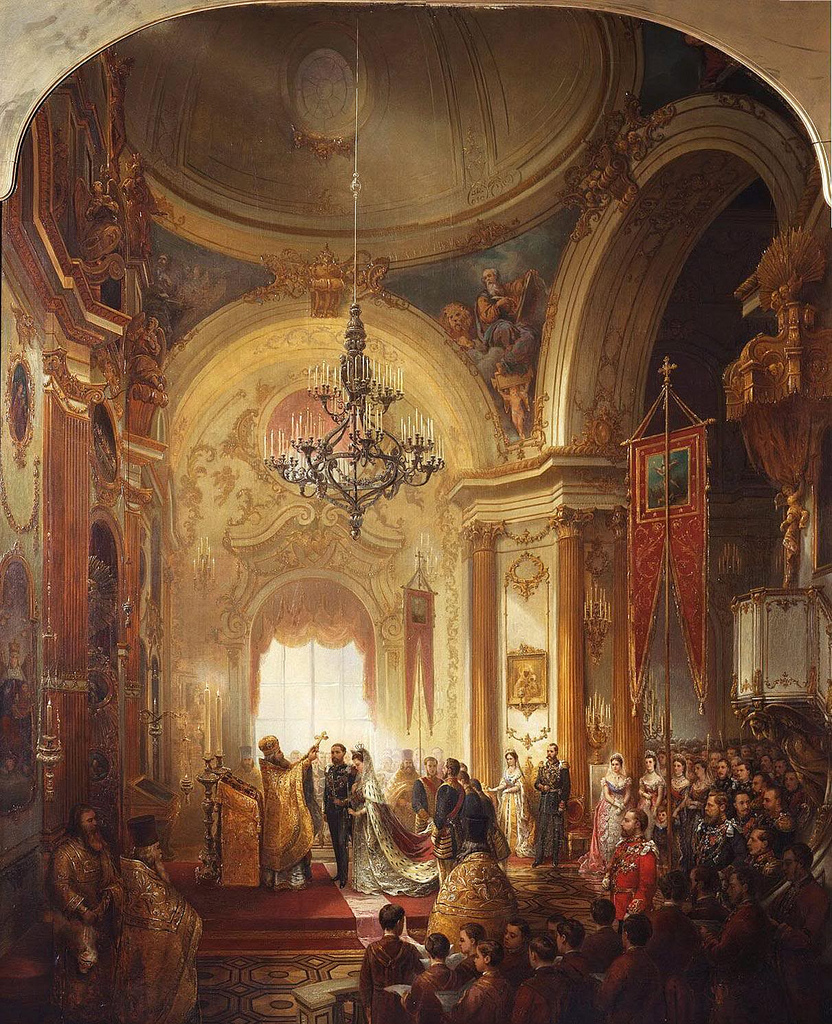
The wedding of Grand Duchess Maria Alexandrovna and Prince Alfred at the Winter Palace, 23 January 1874

On 4 January 1874, Alfred arrived in Saint Petersburg for the wedding and stayed at the Winter Palace. The other British guests arrived on 18 January. The wedding was celebrated in great splendour, at the Grand Church of the Winter Palace on 23 January [O.S. 11 January] 1874. Queen Victoria was represented by her eldest son, Albert Edward, and his wife Alexandra, sister of Tsesarevna Maria Feodorovna (née Princess Dagmar of Denmark). The Queen's eldest daughter, Victoria, and her husband Frederick, Crown Prince of Germany, were present as well.

The marriage ceremony consisted of two parts. The Orthodox service took place first and was performed by the Metropolitans of Saint Petersburg, Moscow, and Kiev in the Imperial Chapel. Grand Dukes Vladimir, Alexei, and Sergei and the groom's brother Prince Arthur, Duke of Connaught and Strathearn, relieved each other taking turns holding the golden crowns over the head of the bride and groom. Maria wore a glittering coronet and a mantle of crimson velvet trimmed with ermine and a sprig of myrtle, specially sent by Queen Victoria. Alfred wore the uniform of the Royal Navy. The Emperor looked pale throughout the entire ceremony and said afterwards: "It is for her happiness, but the light of my life has gone out." After this, the bride and groom each drank thrice from a goblet of wine. The service concluded with the couple joining hands under the priest's stole. Then they all proceeded to the Alexander Hall, where Arthur P. Stanley, Dean of Westminster, made Alfred and Maria husband and wife according to the rites of the Church of England. The two services were followed by a banquet at the palace. The famous opera singer Adelina Patti sang for the guests. The evening ended with a ball at Saint George Hall.

In England that night, Queen Victoria wore the Order of Saint Catherine on her dress and drank a toast to the young couple. Those members of her court who had traveled to Saint Petersburg were overwhelmed by the scale of the celebrations, receptions and entertainments marking the Anglo-Russian marriage. Major-General Sir Howard Craufurd Elphinstone noted that, in one room, supper was served to five hundred people at fifty different tables, with "palms and exotics ... used to so large an extent that it gives the place the appearance of a conservatory ... the heat of the rooms was almost unbearable, and several ladies left the ballroom in a fainting state." Lady Augusta Stanley summed up the wedding in three words: "What a day."

Alfred and Maria spent their wedding night at the Alexander Palace in Tsarskoe Selo. Alexander II had ordered a lavish honeymoon suite on the ground floor, hoping that it would persuade the young couple to remain in Russia. After a short honeymoon in Tsarskoe Selo, however, Alfred and Maria left Russia to live in England. Alexander II never lost hope that they would return, and the honeymoon suite was kept preserved for the couple for two decades. In 1894, it became the bedroom of the last Emperor and his wife, Nicholas II and Alexandra, who were Maria's nephew and Alfred's niece respectively.

== Duchess of Edinburgh ==
=== Arrival in England ===
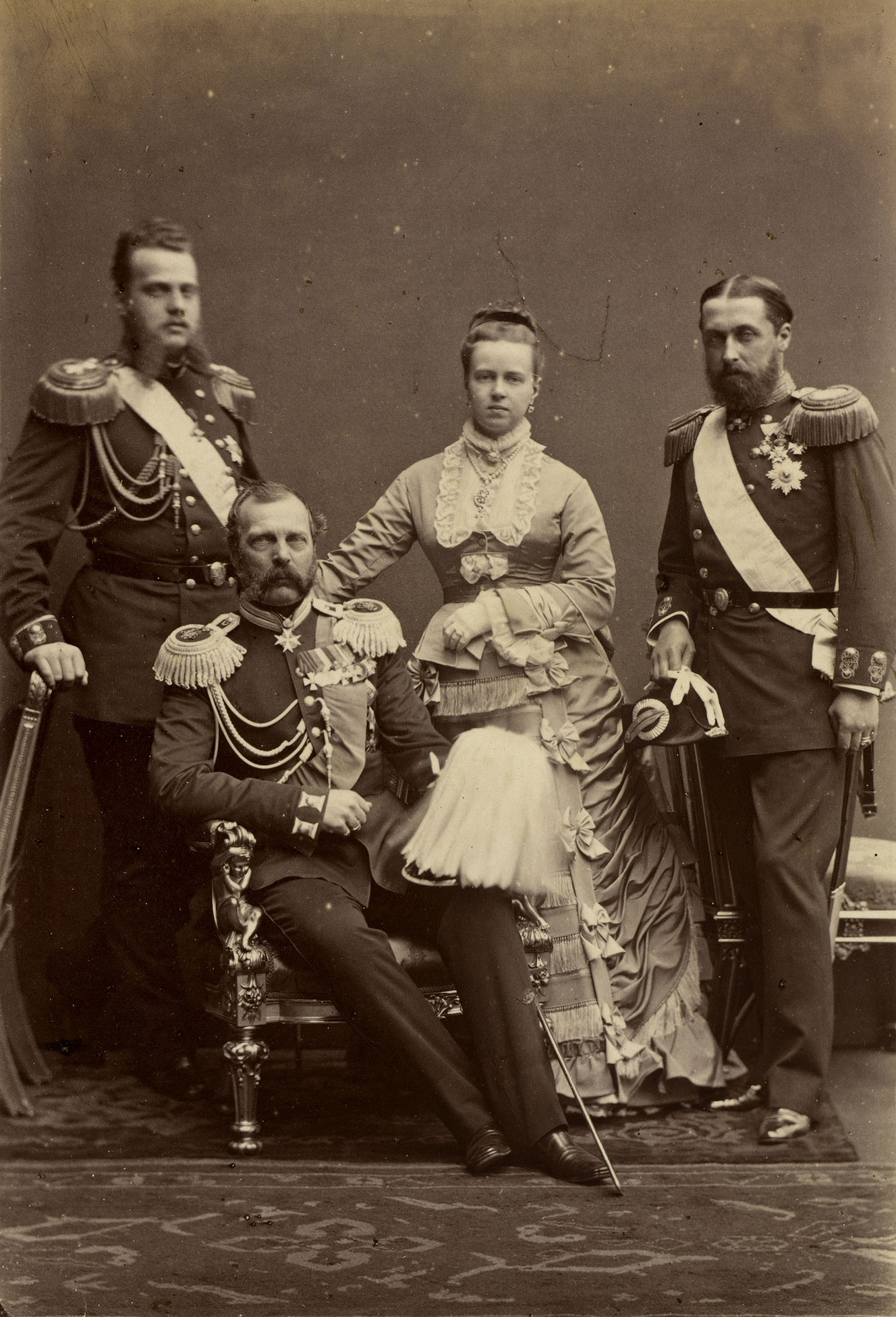
Grand Duke Alexei Alexandrovich, Emperor Alexander II, Grand Duchess Maria Alexandrovna and Prince Alfred, Duke of Edinburgh, May 1874

The Duke and Duchess of Edinburgh arrived in England on 7 March 1874. The town of Windsor was decorated in their honour, with Union Jacks and Russian flags, and Maria was given a great welcome by the waiting crowds. Queen Victoria met them at the South-Western Station and recorded their arrival in her journal: "I took dear Marie in my arms and kissed her warmly several times. I was quite nervous and trembling, so long had I been in expectation ... Dear Marie has a very friendly manner, a pleasant face, beautiful skin and fine bright eyes ... She speaks English wonderfully well." Later on, Queen Victoria described her new daughter-in-law as "most pleasing natural, unaffected and civil" even if "she was not pretty or graceful and held herself badly". "I have formed a high opinion of her," Queen Victoria reported, impressed with "her wonderfully even, cheerful, satisfied temper – her kind and indulgent disposition, free from bigotry and intolerance, and her serious, intelligent mind – so entirely free from everything fast – and so full of occupation and interest in everything, makes her a most agreeable companion. Everyone must like her." The Queen also noted that Maria was "not a bit afraid of Affie and I hope will have the very best influence upon him."

The Duke and Duchess of Edinburgh made their public entry into London on 12 March. Thousands lined the route from Paddington Station to Buckingham Palace to take a glimpse of the new British princess.

Alfred and Maria moved into Clarence House in London, which was their main residence in England. An Orthodox Chapel was installed for her and the Russian priest she had brought from Saint Petersburg. In addition, they had a country house, Eastwell Park, a large estate of 2,500 acres near Ashford in Kent, where the Duke enjoyed shooting parties.

To alleviate his daughter's homesickness, the Emperor and his son Grand Duke Alexei paid a family visit to England in May 1874.

=== The Duchess and Queen Victoria ===
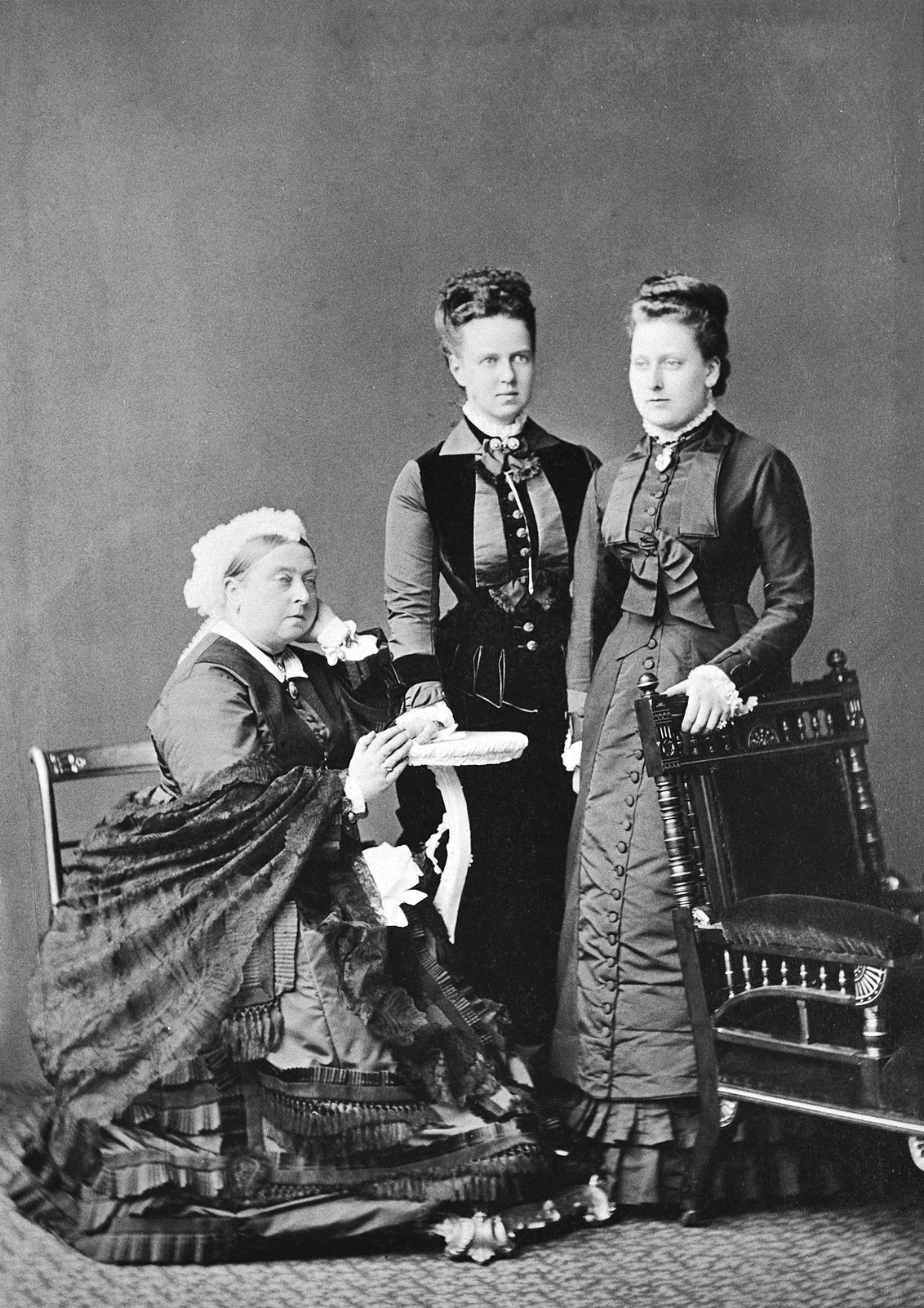
Queen Victoria, the Duchess of Edinburgh and Princess Beatrice

Maria often squabbled with her mother-in-law on how she should be addressed at court. As the daughter of an emperor, she was an Imperial Highness who had precedence over all the grand duchesses in Russia. Once she married her husband, she was only entitled to the style of Royal Highness. Emperor Alexander II alleged that his daughter should continue to be styled as an Imperial Highness, not Royal Highness, "as in all civilized countries". Queen Victoria replied that she did not care whether imperial was used or not, as long as royal came first. There was also the added problem that Maria was both Duchess of Edinburgh and Grand Duchess of Russia, and which title should be written first was a controversial matter.

In retaliation for the quarrel over precedence, the Duchess of Edinburgh took great pleasure in showing off her magnificent jewellery. The British princesses were clearly jealous of her diamonds, as was Queen Victoria. Meriel Buchanan, daughter of the last British ambassador to Imperial Russia, described Maria's first Drawing Room: "The Queen compared the Duchess’s tiara with those of her own daughters, shrugging her shoulders like a bird whose plumage has been ruffled, her mouth drawn down at the corners, in an expression which those who knew her had learned to dread."

When she visited Scotland, Maria was frozen in her unheated bedroom in Balmoral Castle and ordered a fire to be lit. When she was out, Queen Victoria entered the room and ordered a maid to throw water on the fire and open all the windows.

Maria's relationship with her mother-in-law deteriorated. She wrote letters to her father describing Queen Victoria as a "silly obstinate old fool". Empress Maria was angry with Queen Victoria and wrote, "To be quite frank, it is difficult to take such a mother-in-law seriously, and I am sorry on Marie's account." Maria's daughter, Queen Marie of Romania, reflected that, "I do not think my mother always found it easy being Queen Victoria's daughter-in-law, though they had great respect for each other."

Maria was angry that Queen Victoria opposed the marriage of her granddaughter Princess Elisabeth of Hesse and by Rhine to Maria's favorite brother, Grand Duke Sergei. In August 1883, she wrote, "that happy and so entirely satisfactory... prospect of marriage of my brother Sergei is going I think to fall through, under the deplorable influence of the Queen... I knew that from the start she set her heart against it saying that she had only heard his praise, but he had the greatest of all misfortunes, he was Russian and she had enough of one Russian in the family (meaning me, of course)."

=== At the British court ===
Maria had five children. Nine months after the wedding, she gave birth to her first child and only surviving son, young Alfred, at Buckingham Palace on 15 October 1874. Her mother came to London during the confinement to visit Maria and meet her grandson. On 29 October 1875 at Eastwell Park, she gave birth to her second child and first daughter, whom she named Marie after herself and her mother. Maria shocked British society by nursing the children herself. While the Duchess was in Malta with her husband who was stationed there as an officer in the Royal Navy, she gave birth to her second daughter, Victoria Melita, on 25 November 1876. On 1 September 1878, she gave birth to her third daughter, Alexandra, at Rosenau Palace in Coburg. On 13 October 1879, Maria gave birth prematurely to a stillborn son at Eastwell Park. On 20 April 1884, she gave birth to her fourth daughter, Beatrice, also at Eastwell Park. Years later, she lamented that she only had five children: "The only real heavenly moment is the birth of the child. This cannot be compared to anything else. I think if I had even a dozen children, I would have kept the same feeling."

The family's main residence was Clarence House. Autumn, Christmas and the New Year were spent at Eastwell Park. On summer holidays, the family went to Osborne House on the Isle of Wight.

In 1877, Russia went to war with the Ottoman Empire in an attempt to gain control of the Balkans. Queen Victoria sent Emperor Alexander II a series of aggressive telegrams that almost led to a state of war between the two countries. The Duchess was deeply shocked at her mother-in-law's hostility towards her country and her own father in particular.

Maria found it difficult to settle at the British court. Her mother wrote that "Marie thinks London hideous... the air there appalling, the English food abominable, the later hours very tiring, the visits to Windsor and Osborne boring beyond belief." Maria described London as "an impossible place, where people are mad of pleasure" and a let down compared to the broad streets, golden domes, and magnificent palaces of Saint Petersburg. In her eyes, Buckingham Palace and Windsor Castle could never compete with the splendours of the Winter Palace. Constant visits to her mother-in-law at Windsor Castle and Osborne House were tedious. Although she loved music, the duchess did not like the Royal Albert Hall, describing it as "all ecclesiastical and ... quite boring ... Every concert goes on for several hours". During a banquet at Marlborough House, she had a conversation with the prime minister, Benjamin Disraeli. When Disraeli identified his rival, she exclaimed, "What a strange state society is in here. Wherever I go there is a double. Two Prime Ministers, two Secretaries of State, two Lord Chamberlains, and two Lord Chancellors."

Maria disliked her in-laws. Queen Victoria's company was oppressive, and of her sisters- and brothers-in-law, she only cared for the two youngest: Prince Leopold and Princess Beatrice. Proud of her strong intellect, she considered Alexandra, the Princess of Wales, a light-minded and foolish woman.

Maria became increasingly homesick for Russia and was happy for any excuse to return there. She spoke of her "Russian heart" and said that "every sympathetic voice from the Fatherland is sacred to me." Her daughter, Queen Marie of Romania, reflected that "my mother dearly loved her native country, and she never really felt completely happy in England."

British people thought her rough and masculine in her manners. Her imperious attitude towards her servants and her defiance of English convention by smoking in public made her unpopular. She made it equally plain that she did not care what people thought.

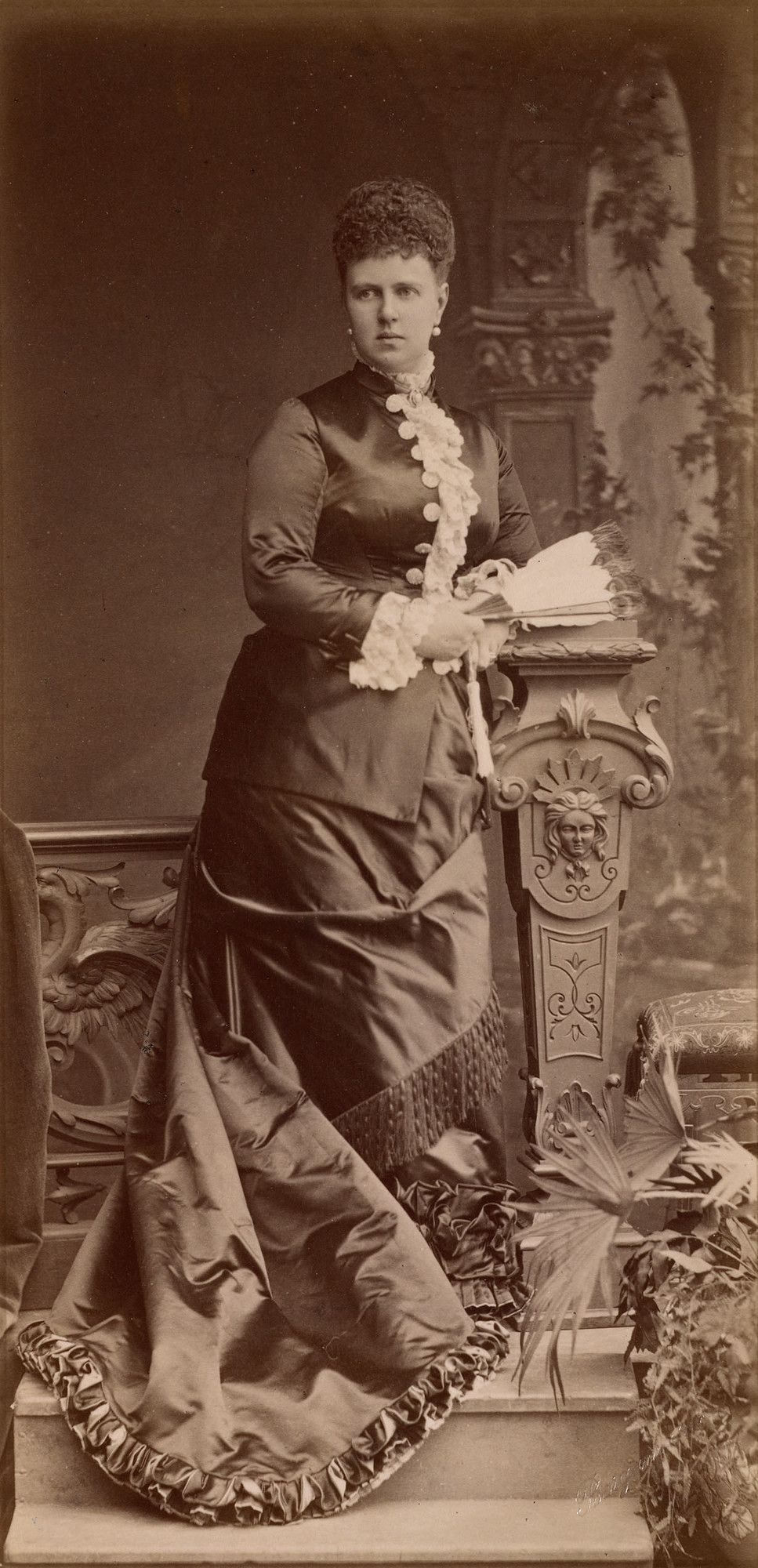
The Duchess of Edinburgh

The Duke of Edinburgh was the heir presumptive of his childless uncle Ernest II, Duke of Saxe-Coburg and Gotha, elder brother of Prince Albert. After the Russo-Turkish War of 1877–1878, Maria resided in Coburg for a long while, as her husband was expected to succeed his aging uncle. On 17 February 1880, Maria was back in Russia, during the 25th anniversary celebration of her father's coronation. That day, radicals attempted to assassinate the Emperor and the entire imperial family. A terrorist bomb demolished the dining room and the guard room at the Winter Palace. Maria returned to Russia again in June 1880, to be with her dying mother. She was back in England at Clarence House when her father was killed by a terrorist bomb. Maria had to rush back to Russia to attend the funeral in Saint Petersburg in March 1881. The Duke and Duchess of Edinburgh were present at the coronation of her brother, Emperor Alexander III, in Moscow in May 1883. In July 1884, they traveled to Ilinskoe, outside Moscow, to visit Grand Duke Sergei, Maria's younger brother, who had married Queen Victoria's granddaughter and Alfred's niece, Princess Elisabeth of Hesse and by Rhine.

=== In Malta ===
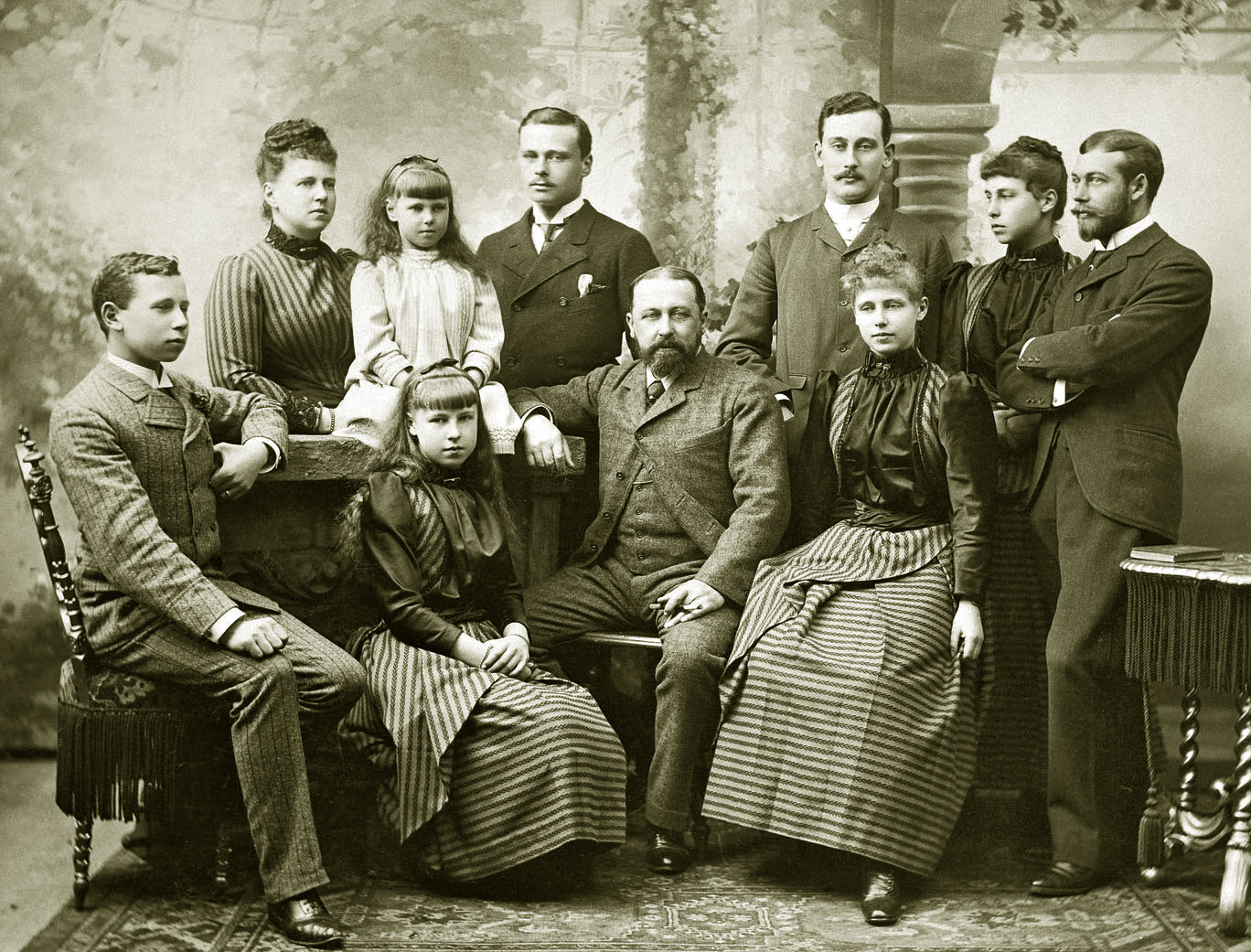
The Duke and Duchess of Edinburgh with their five children, and Prince George of Wales, Prince Maximilian of Baden, and Grand Duke Ernest Louis of Hesse, in Coburg, 1890

In January 1886, the Duke was appointed commander-in-chief of the British Mediterranean Fleet, based in Malta. In October 1886, the family settled there. For the next three years, they spent every winter at the San Anton Palace in Malta. Life in the island was unexciting for the Duchess of Edinburgh, but it was a welcome respite from living in England. While in Malta, the Duchess proved to be an excellent hostess, entertaining naval officers and their wives. In 1887, the couple returned briefly to London to take part in Queen Victoria's Golden Jubilee. Her husband's career in the British navy and their many relations in the European courts allowed Maria to travel extensively, something that she truly enjoyed. She visited most European countries, including Spain, Italy, the Netherlands, Greece, and even Montenegro, as well as making annual trips to Germany, England, and Russia.

== Duchess of Saxe-Coburg and Gotha ==
=== In Devonport ===
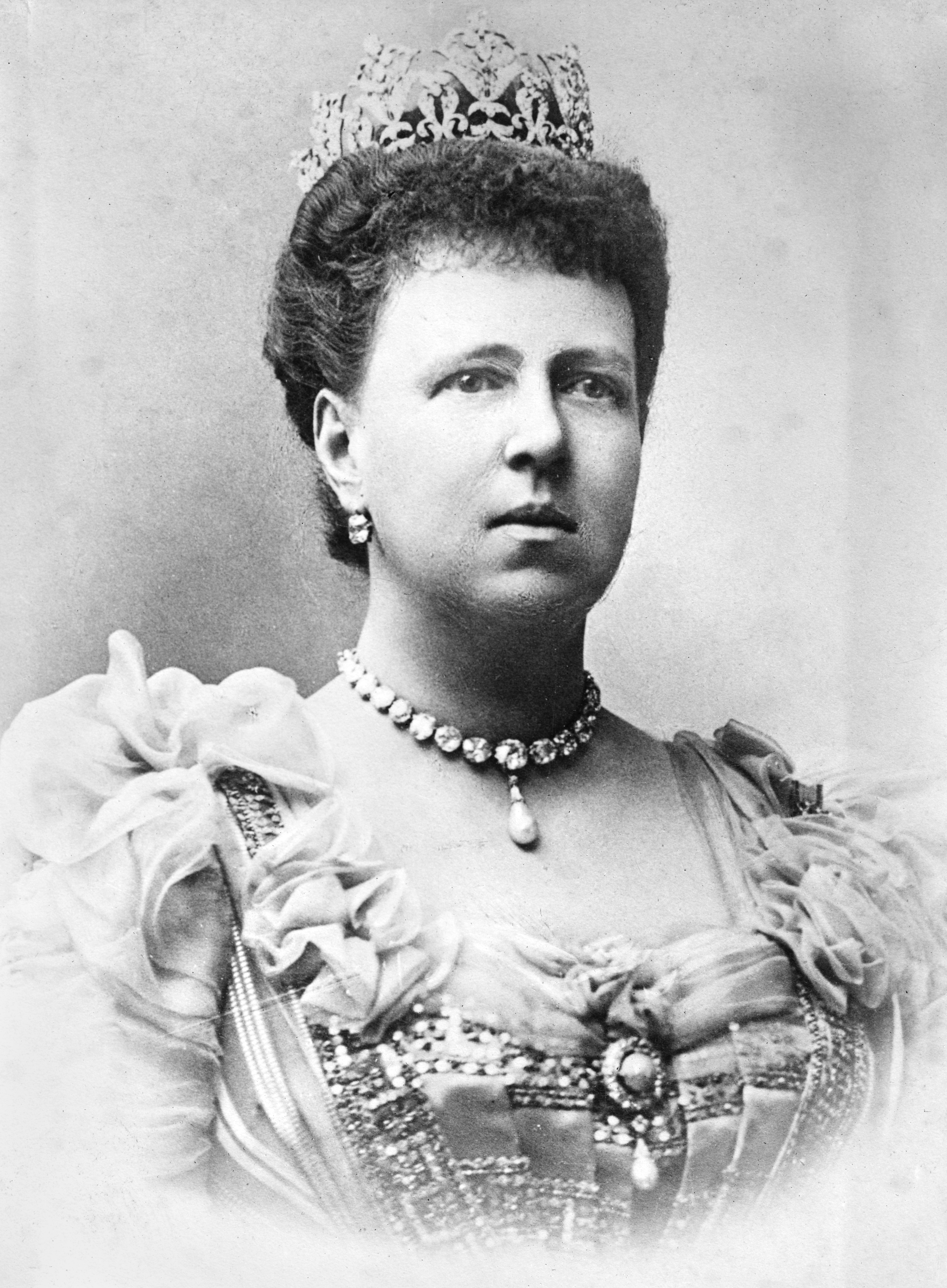
Maria Alexandrovna, Duchess of Saxe-Coburg and Gotha, 1901

In March 1887, the Duke relinquished his command of the Mediterranean Fleet, and the family moved to Coburg. Their main residence was Edinburgh Palais, where the Duchess held court. Her husband, occupied with his naval affairs, was away most of the time. Responsibility for the education of the couple's five children fell upon the Duchess. She was a strict, but devoted mother who made sure to be the most important person in her children's lives. Between August 1890 and June 1893, the Duke was stationed at the Royal Navy's base in Devonport. Maria did not care for the Admiralty House, her husband's official residence, and only made rare visits to Devonport with her children.

With the passing of the years, Alfred and Maria grew apart. They had little in common other than a shared interest in music and their children. He was reserved, taciturn, moody, ill-tempered, and a heavy drinker. By the mid-1880s he was an alcoholic. The Duke was described as "rude, touchy, willful, unscrupulous, improvident, and unfaithful." The Duchess resented her husband's attitude, but kept her marriage going, hiding her troubled married life from her children, providing a happy environment for them. She later confessed to one of her daughters that she felt she was never anything more than her husband's "legitimate mistress". Arguments over their children added to the couple's marital problems. The Duke hoped that their eldest daughter, Marie, would marry his nephew, the future King George V. The Duchess, however, was determined that her daughter should avoid her mistake, and married her instead to Crown Prince Ferdinand of Romania on 10 January 1893.

=== In Coburg and Gotha ===
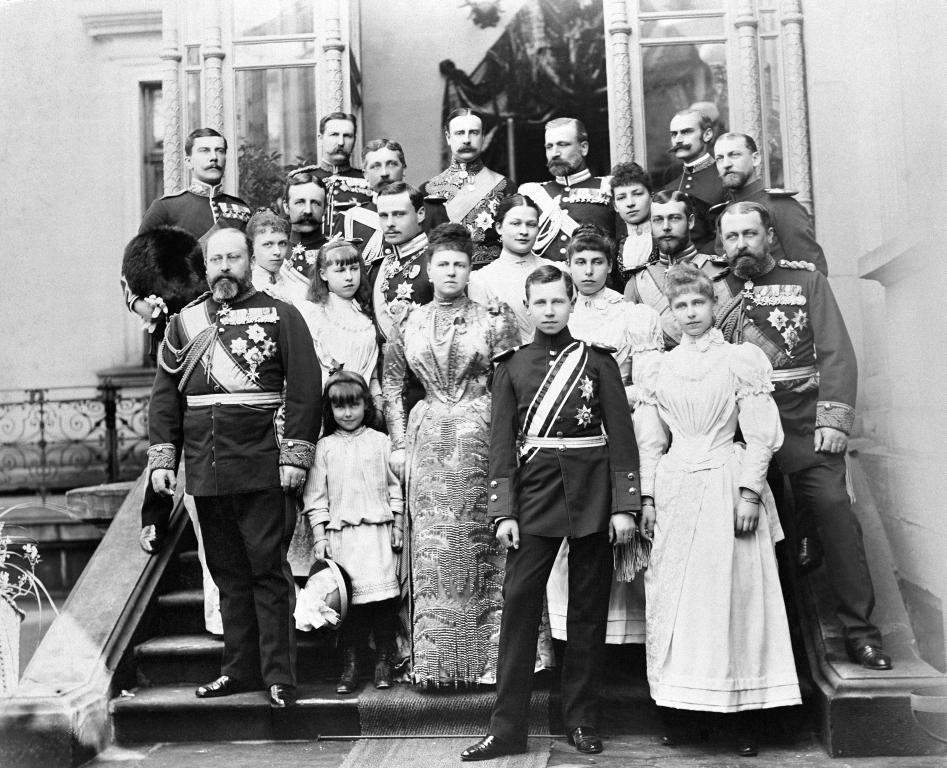
The Duke and Duchess of Saxe-Coburg and Gotha with family members at their son's majority

Upon the death of his paternal uncle on 22 August 1893, the Duke of Edinburgh inherited the vacant throne of Saxe-Coburg and Gotha, his elder brother, the Prince of Wales, having deferred his right to the succession. With her husband's ascension to the ducal throne, Maria became Duchess of Saxe-Coburg and Gotha, in addition to being Duchess of Edinburgh. Unlike her husband, who was disgruntled to leave his career in the navy, Maria thoroughly enjoyed her new role. She found the country "charming" and the prospect of "a new fine position, with plenty to do" a "real God-send". Known for its hunting forest and picturesque castles, the ducal property was relatively small, comprising separate estates in Coburg, Gotha, Upper Austria, and Tyrol, but there she could live according to her desires in a domain of her own. The family moved to Ehrenburg Palace, the duke's official residence, but they all preferred their summer house, Rosenau Palace, a gingerbread-yellow villa on a hill with views of the surrounding countryside. There were also two residences in Gotha where they had to live part of the year: Friedenstein Palace and Reinhardsbrunn, which the Duke enjoyed for its hunting grounds. The Duchess took on updating the badly furnished castles, and also charitable works, opening an establishment for those with intellectual disabilities that bore her name. Her passions were the opera and the theater, which she supported both in Coburg and in Gotha. The Duchess was also an avid reader and enjoyed mushroom hunting.

The main family residence in Coburg was a building that had been acquired for Prince Alfred's use in 1865. Known as Edinburgh Palais, it was across the central square from the Ehrenburg Palace, the official residence of the reigning duke, and next to the town's opera hall. It was extensively remodelled in 1881 to accommodate the couple's growing family. The royal couple's rooms were on the second floor, while the bedrooms of the four young princesses were on the third floor. Both the Duke and Duchess of Edinburgh were avid collectors. In Edinburgh Palais, there were many objects that reminded Maria of her homeland. She also organised entertainment in the Russian fashion.

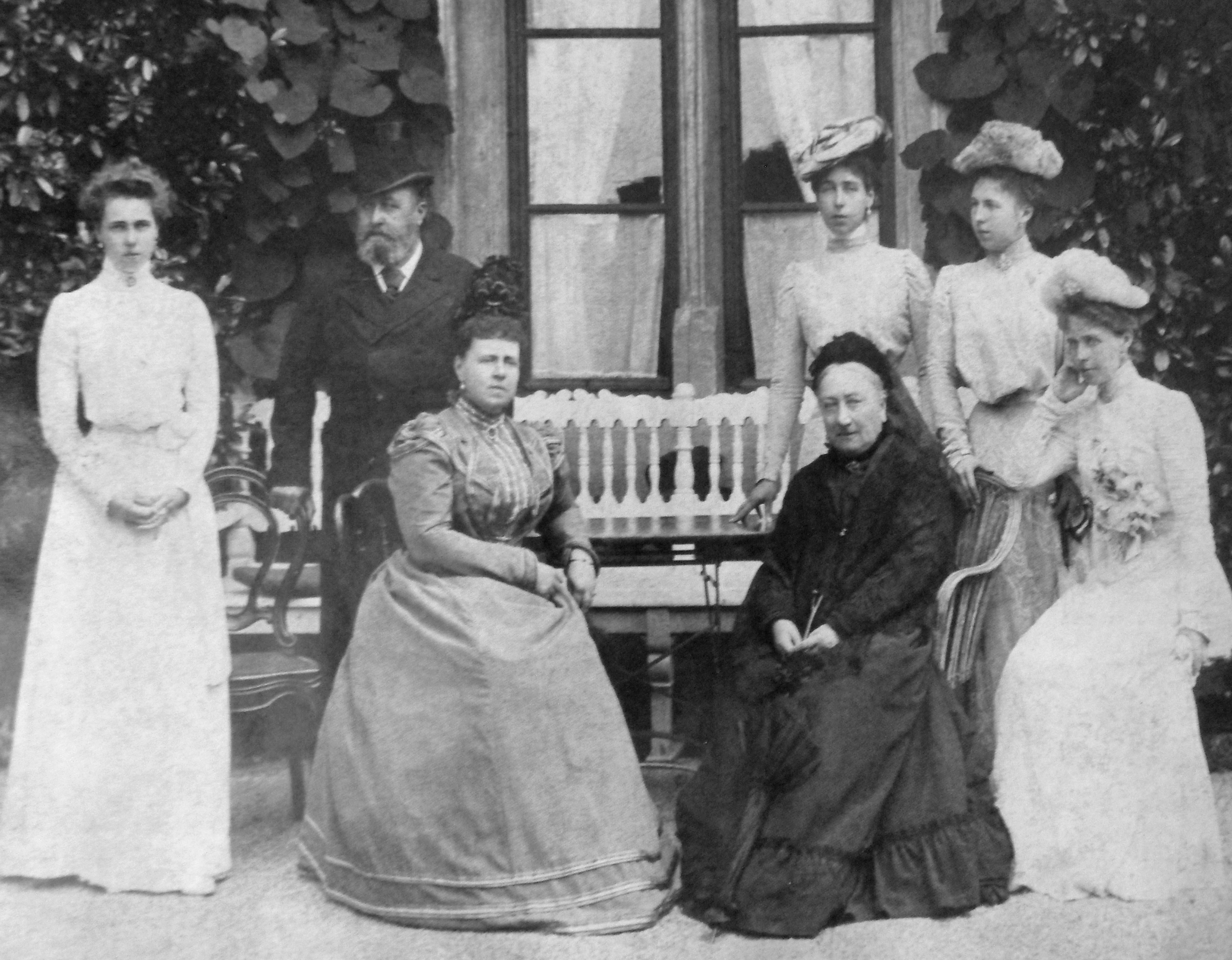
From left to right: Princess Beatrice, the Duke of Saxe-Coburg and Gotha, the Duchess, the Dowager Duchess, Princess Victoria, Princess Alexandra and Princess Marie at Rosenau

Alfred and Maria's second daughter, Victoria Melita, married Ernest Louis, Grand Duke of Hesse on 19 April 1894. The Duchess was initially against this match as Ernest was close to his British grandmother, Queen Victoria, who arrived at Coburg with many other royals for the wedding. In November 1894, Marie's eldest brother, Alexander III, died of nephritis, aged forty-nine, leaving his twenty-six-year-old son, Nicholas II, as the new emperor. Alfred and Maria went to Russia, arriving just before Alexander III's death. They stayed on in Saint Petersburg for the wedding of Nicholas to his fiancée, Princess Alix of Hesse and by Rhine, the youngest surviving daughter of Alfred's deceased sister, Princess Alice.

Over her husband's objections, the Duchess arranged the marriage of her third daughter, Alexandra, in September 1895, to Ernst II, Prince of Hohenlohe-Langenburg, a grandson of Queen Victoria's half-sister, Feodora. He was an attaché at the German embassy in London and his family was mediatized but not a reigning royal family. The Duchess's main concern was her wayward only son, "Young Alfred", who had a checkered career in the Imperial German Army. On 15 October 1895, he reached his majority, but he was already in bad health. Alexandra's wedding took place in Coburg in April 1896, and the following month, Maria travelled to Russia with her husband and their other four children for Emperor Nicholas II's coronation in Moscow. Around 1895-1896, Maria, like her brother Tsar Alexander III, held Don Carlos—the Carlist and Legitimist claimant to the thrones of France and Spain—in high regard, and she appears to have wished for his daughter, Princess Béatrice, to marry her son Alfred. The marriage does not take place because Don Carlos refuses to let his daughter marry a Protestant. There is no evidence that Alfred ever met Beatrice, but her grandmother Archduchess Maria Beatrix of Austria wrote "I would have been devastated if one of my granddaughters had married him."

In June 1897, the Duchess and her husband went back to London to take part in Queen Victoria's Diamond Jubilee. By then, the couple's relationship had deteriorated further. Maria despaired in finding a topic of conversation with her difficult husband as he hated her interest in literature and the theater, while she found his fondness for politics and hunting "dull". The Duchess was relieved when her husband was away. She wrote to her eldest daughter "if only you knew how easy and comfortable life is without him." By 1898, the Duke's health had deteriorated, exacerbated by his excessive smoking and drinking.

=== Family tragedies ===
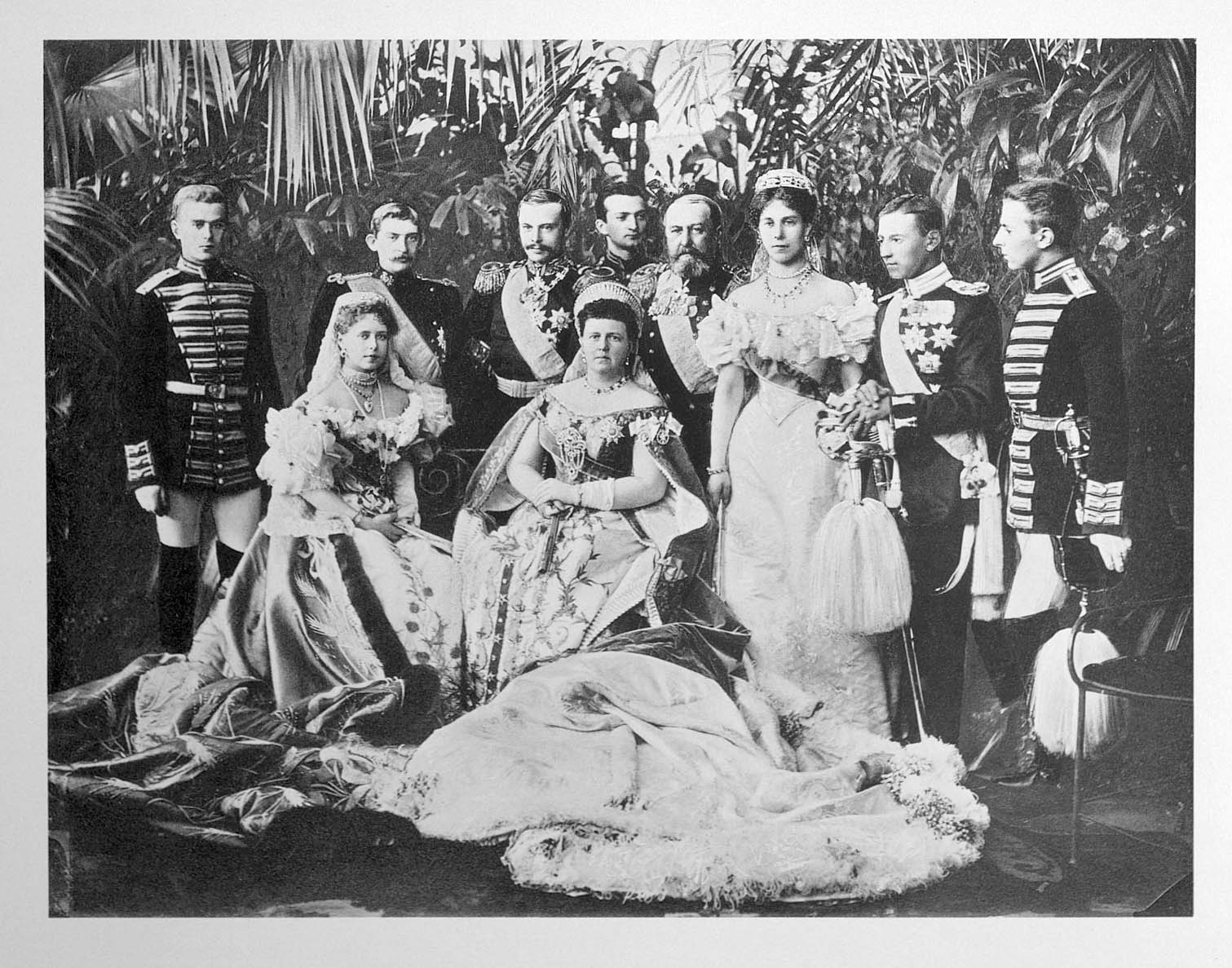
The Duke and Duchess of Saxe-Coburg and Gotha with their three eldest children, and two sons-in-law, during the coronation of Nicholas II in Moscow, 1896

On 23 January 1899 Maria and her husband celebrated their 25th wedding anniversary at Friedenstein Palace in Gotha. Absent from the festivities was their only son, who was gravely ill. Young Alfred was a junior officer in Potsdam, where his chief hobbies were gambling, drinking and womanizing. He had contracted syphilis in 1892, and by 1898, his health deteriorated rapidly. He died at the age of twenty-four on 6 February 1899 in Meran, after reportedly shooting himself at Gotha during his parents' wedding anniversary celebrations. The Duke was heartbroken at Young Alfred's death. This tragedy drove the parents farther apart as Alfred blamed his wife, who had been responsible for Young Alfred's education. In her grief, the Duchess sank to her knees sobbing uncontrollably during her son's funeral. With the death of Young Alfred, the heir to the Duchy of Saxe-Coburg and Gotha was Alfred's nephew Charles Edward, Duke of Albany, who came to Germany to be educated there. The succession to the duchy was complicated by the news that Alfred himself had throat cancer, too advanced for any treatment. By May 1900, he was unable to swallow and could only be fed by a tube. The Duchess and their youngest daughter, Beatrice, who were in England visiting Queen Victoria, returned on 17 July, unaware of the seriousness of the Duke's condition. On 30 July 1900, he died in his sleep at Rosenau Palace in Coburg. Maria was at his bedside with their daughters Victoria Melita, Alexandra, and Beatrice. Maria became Dowager Duchess of Saxe-Coburg and Gotha, while the duchy went to Alfred's nephew Charles Edward, then sixteen years old. During his minority, the regency fell on Maria's son-in-law, Prince Ernest of Hohenlohe-Langenburg, for nearly five years.

== Last years ==
The Dowager Duchess in the gardens of her residence in Switzerland, 1920

Maria was only forty-six years old when she became a widow. After the death of her husband, she stayed for a while in England, where she had to relinquish Clarence House which was inherited by her brother-in-law, the Duke of Connaught. Maria was at Osborne House during the final days of her mother-in law, Queen Victoria. In her widowhood, she kept Edinburgh Palais as her home in Coburg, and Friedenstein Palace in Gotha. Rosenau Palace continued to serve as her country house. However, she spent most of her time at her villa overlooking a lake in Tegernsee, Bavaria. Her winter residence was the Château de Fabron, near Nice. The upkeep of five residences put a strain on her finances.

Although she was critical of her daughters, she supported them during their personal crises. In 1901, her second daughter Victoria Melita divorced her husband and came to live with her. On 25 September 1905, Victoria Melita married her maternal first cousin, Grand Duke Kirill Vladimirovich. The Dowager Duchess's relationship with her nephew Emperor Nicholas II deteriorated, as he opposed Victoria Melita's second marriage, and it doomed the romance between Princess Beatrice and his younger brother, Grand Duke Michael Alexandrovich.

Maria lamented that, after working hard for the Duchy of Saxe-Coburg, and clearing its finances, the duchy passed to Charles Edward who took control of it at his majority in July 1905. Relations with the new duke were initially tense, but improved when Charles Edward provided his full support to the marriage of Maria's youngest daughter, Princess Beatrice to Alfonso de Orleans y Borbón, Infante of Spain on 15 July 1909. In the following years, the Dowager Duchess continued to make frequent trips to her native Russia in order to stay with her daughter, Victoria Melita. The last one of her trips took place in May 1914.

At the outbreak of World War I, Maria was in Coburg after returning from a visit to King George V in Buckingham Palace. Her sympathies were divided, but she sided with Germany against her native Russia. The Coburg family faced intense hostility during the war for their British and Russian connections. The Dowager Duchess' position in Coburg became untenable as Russophobia took over the German Empire. To avoid complications, Maria stayed away from Coburg, retiring to Tegernsee in Bavaria. At one point, while she was returning home with her two younger daughters, their car was stopped by an angry mob who recognised her and harassed her for her Russian heritage. It took the police over an hour to extricate them from the situation. After that incident Maria went to live in exile in Switzerland at the Walhaus, an annex of the Dolder Grand Hotel in Zürich.

In August 1917 she wrote: "At the age of 63, I am very fresh in mind, if not in body, and I can support with patience and resignation a sad and perhaps miserable end of life which is in store for my old age... Sometimes I also seem to despair, but not about myself, but about the state of things in general." Many of her relatives were killed during the Russian Revolution, including her only surviving brother Grand Duke Paul, and her nephew Emperor Nicholas II with his immediate family. In the aftermath of the war, the Dowager Duchess lost her large fortune as the bulk of it was held in trust in Russia. Her British income was small, and as she never saw a penny of it, she was forced to sell a great part of her jewellery collection.

Living under reduced circumstances in Zürich, Maria was reunited with her two eldest daughters, Marie and Victoria Melita, who had been on the opposite side during the war. In July 1920, she wrote: "I am too utterly disgusted with the present state of the world and mankind in general... They have destroyed and ruined my beloved Russia, my much-loved Germany." She was a broken woman, her figure, always plump, became thin and her hands trembling. Although she had been affected by gastric troubles, her death came unexpectedly. Five days after her sixty-seventh birthday, on 22 October 1920, she died in her sleep of a heart attack. She was buried beside her husband and their son in the ducal mausoleum at Friedhof am Glockenberg in Coburg. "She was profoundly religious," her eldest daughter wrote, "I hope God will not disappoint her as most things and beings did in this life."

== Archives ==
Maria's letters to her third daughter, Alexandra, are preserved in the Hohenlohe Central Archive (Hohenlohe-Zentralarchiv Neuenstein) in Neuenstein Castle in the town of Neuenstein, Baden-Württemberg, Germany.

== Honours ==
- Russian Empire: Dame Grand Cross of the Order of Saint Catherine, 17 October 1853
- United Kingdom:
  - Royal Order of Victoria and Albert, 1st Class
  - Companion of the Order of the Crown of India, 1 January 1878
  - Lady of Justice of the Order of Saint John
- German Empire: Dame of the Order of Louise, 1st Class
  - Hesse and by Rhine: Dame of the Order of the Golden Lion, 1 May 1896
- Spain: Dame of the Order of Queen Maria Luisa, 20 May 1888
- Kingdom of Portugal: Dame of the Order of Saint Isabel, 28 February 1894

== Issue ==
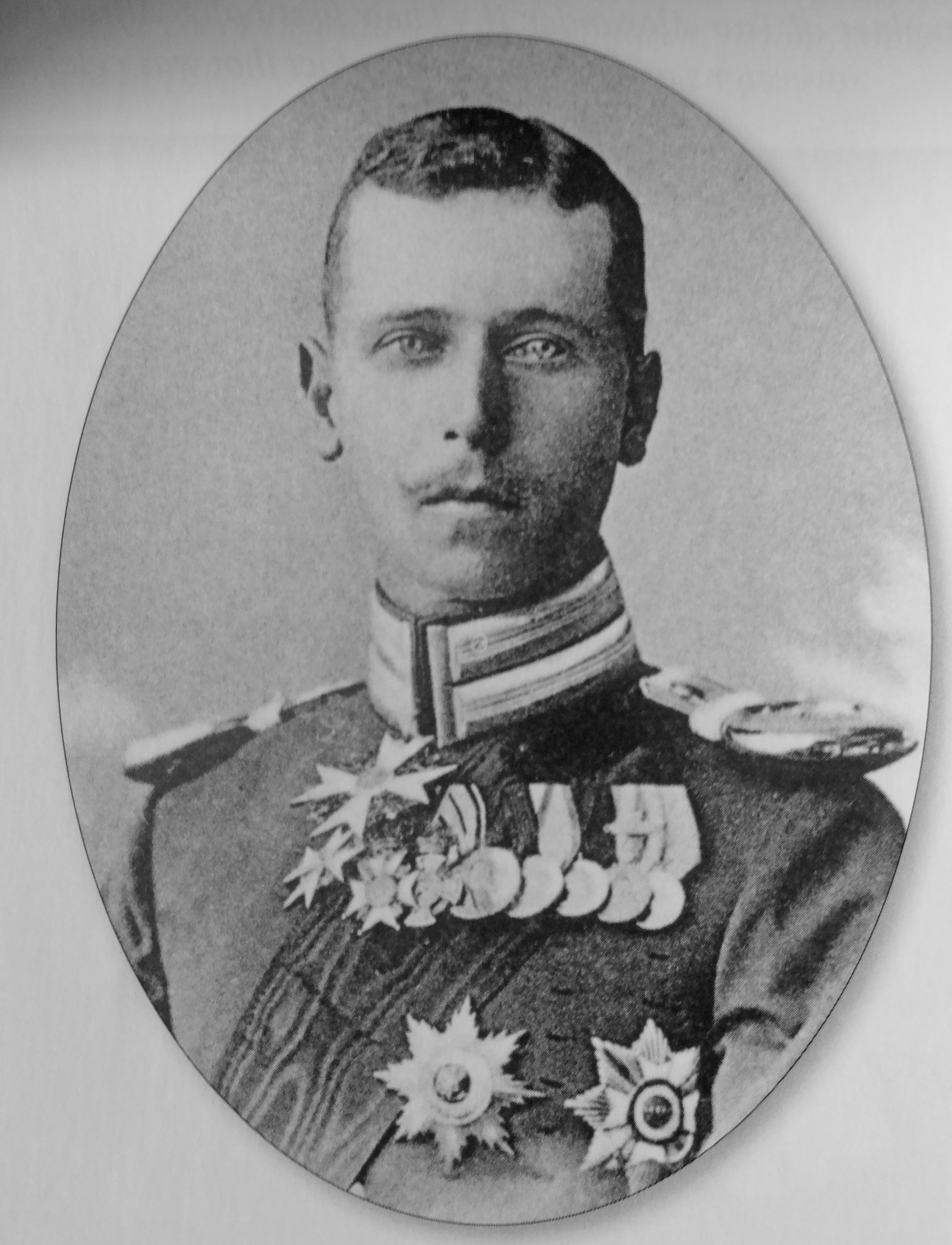
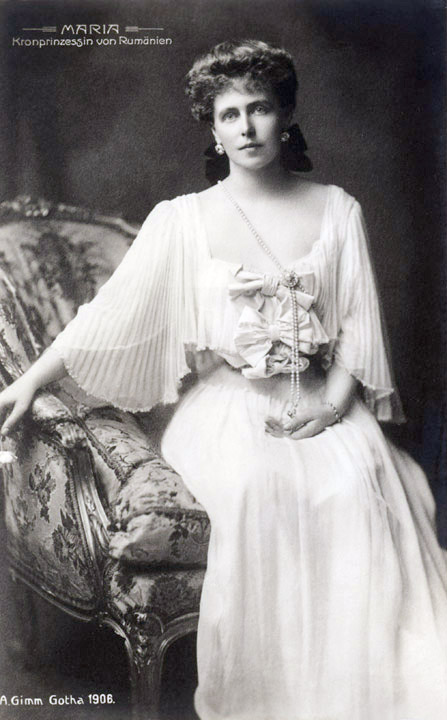
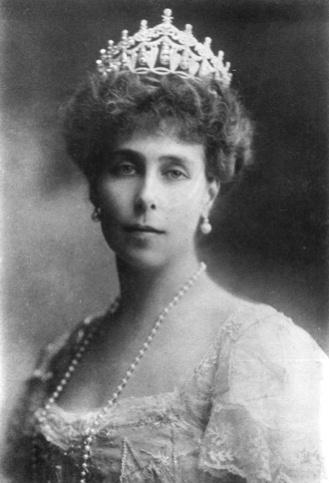
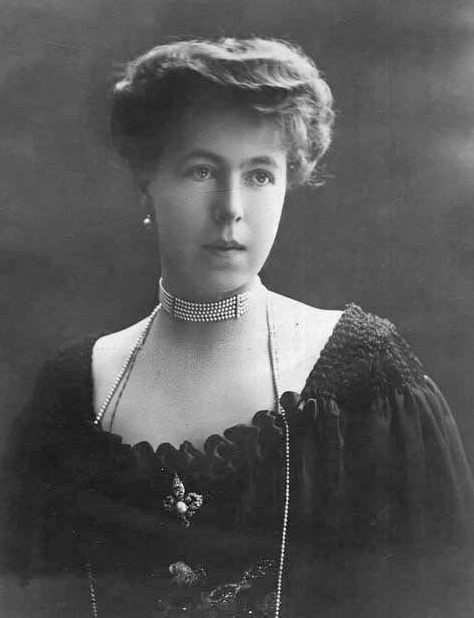
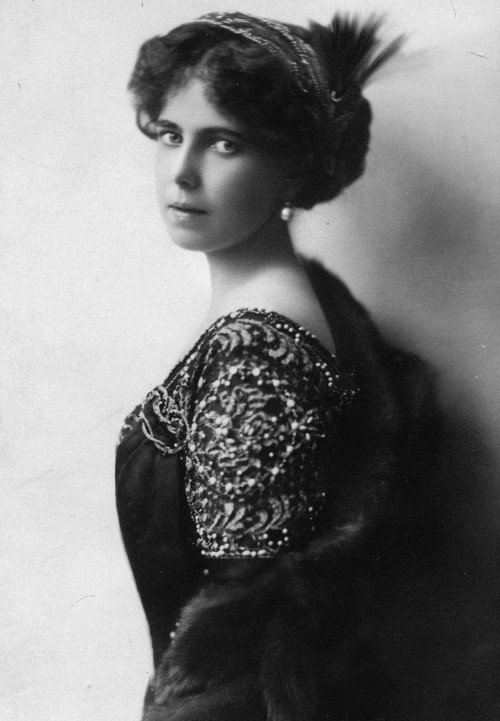
Image	Name	Birth	Death	Notes
	Alfred Alexander William Ernest Albert	15 October 1874	6 February 1899	Hereditary Prince of Saxe-Coburg and Gotha from 22 August 1893
	Marie Alexandra Victoria	29 October 1875	18 July 1938	Married, 10 January 1893, King Ferdinand I of Romania; had issue
	Victoria Melita	25 November 1876	2 March 1936	Married, (1) 19 April 1894, Ernst Ludwig, Grand Duke of Hesse and by Rhine; had issue; divorced 21 December 1901 (2) 8 October 1905, Grand Duke Kirill Vladimirovich of Russia; had issue
	Alexandra Louise Olga Victoria	1 September 1878	16 April 1942	Married, 20 April 1896, Ernst II, Prince of Hohenlohe-Langenburg; had issue
	Unnamed son	13 October 1879	13 October 1879	Stillborn, at Eastwell Park
	Beatrice Leopoldine Victoria	20 April 1884	13 July 1966	Married, 15 July 1909, Infante Alfonso of Spain, 3rd Duke of Galliera; had issue

== See also ==
- Marie biscuit

== Notes ==
Grand Duchess Maria Alexandrovna of Russia House of Holstein-Gottorp-Romanov Cadet branch of the House of Oldenburg Born: 17 October 1853 Died: 24 October 1920
German nobility
Preceded by Alexandrine of Baden	Duchess consort of Saxe-Coburg and Gotha; 22 August 1893 – 30 July 1900	Vacant Title next held by Victoria Adelaide of Schleswig-Holstein
