= State Museum for Nature and Man =

Natural History Museum in Oldenberg, Germany

Coordinates: 53°08′01″N 8°13′10″E

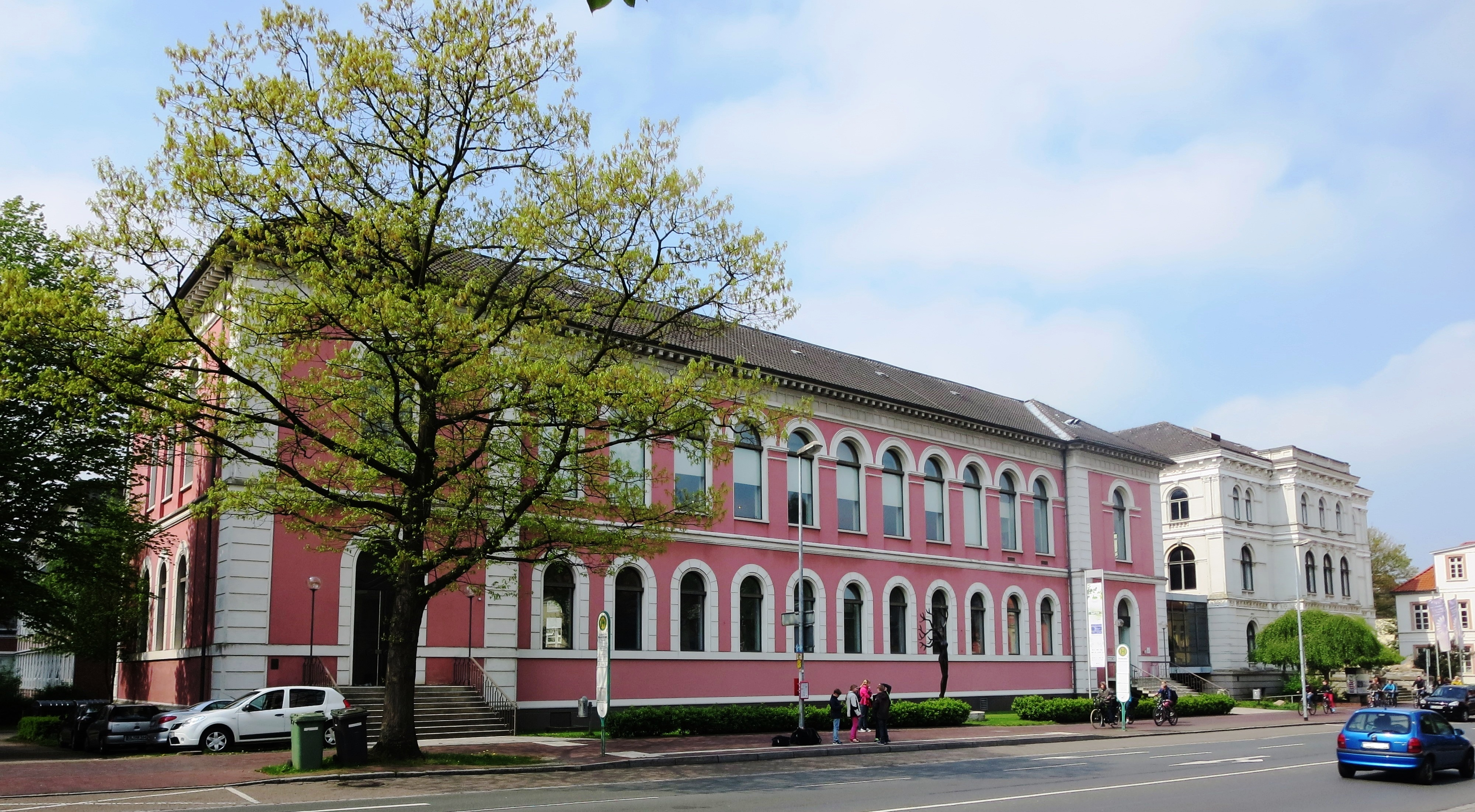
View of the museum building.

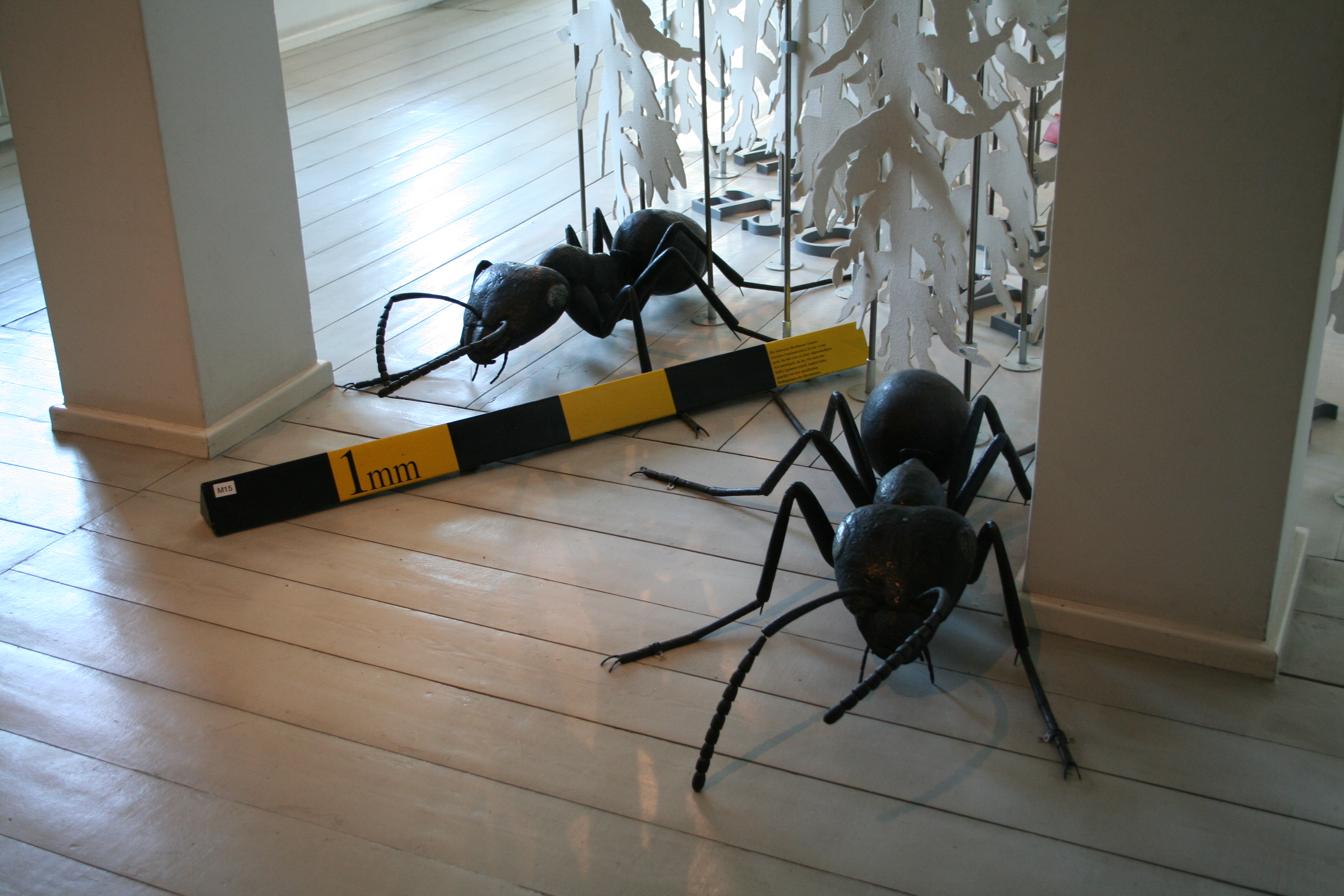
Ant exhibit at the museum.

The State Museum for Nature and Man (in German: Landesmuseum für Natur und Mensch) is a natural history, ethnology, and archaeology museum in the city of Oldenburg, Lower Saxony, Germany.

The museum was opened in 1836 as Oldenburg's first natural history museum by Grand Duke Paul Friedrich August. It moved to its current location in 1880. The museum presents collections of archaeology, ethnology, and natural museum, in permanent interdisciplinary exhibits, together with an aquarium. The building is southwest of the Schlossgarten Oldenburg. Further museums to the northwest include the Augusteum, the Prinzenpalais, and Schloss Oldenburg.

== See also ==
- List of visitor attractions in Oldenburg
