= Augusteum (disambiguation) =

Augusteum may be:

- Augusteum
- Augusteum (Leipzig)
- Augusteum (Oldenburg)
- Augusteum (Wittenberg)
