= State Museum for Art and Cultural History =

Art collection and museums in Oldenburg

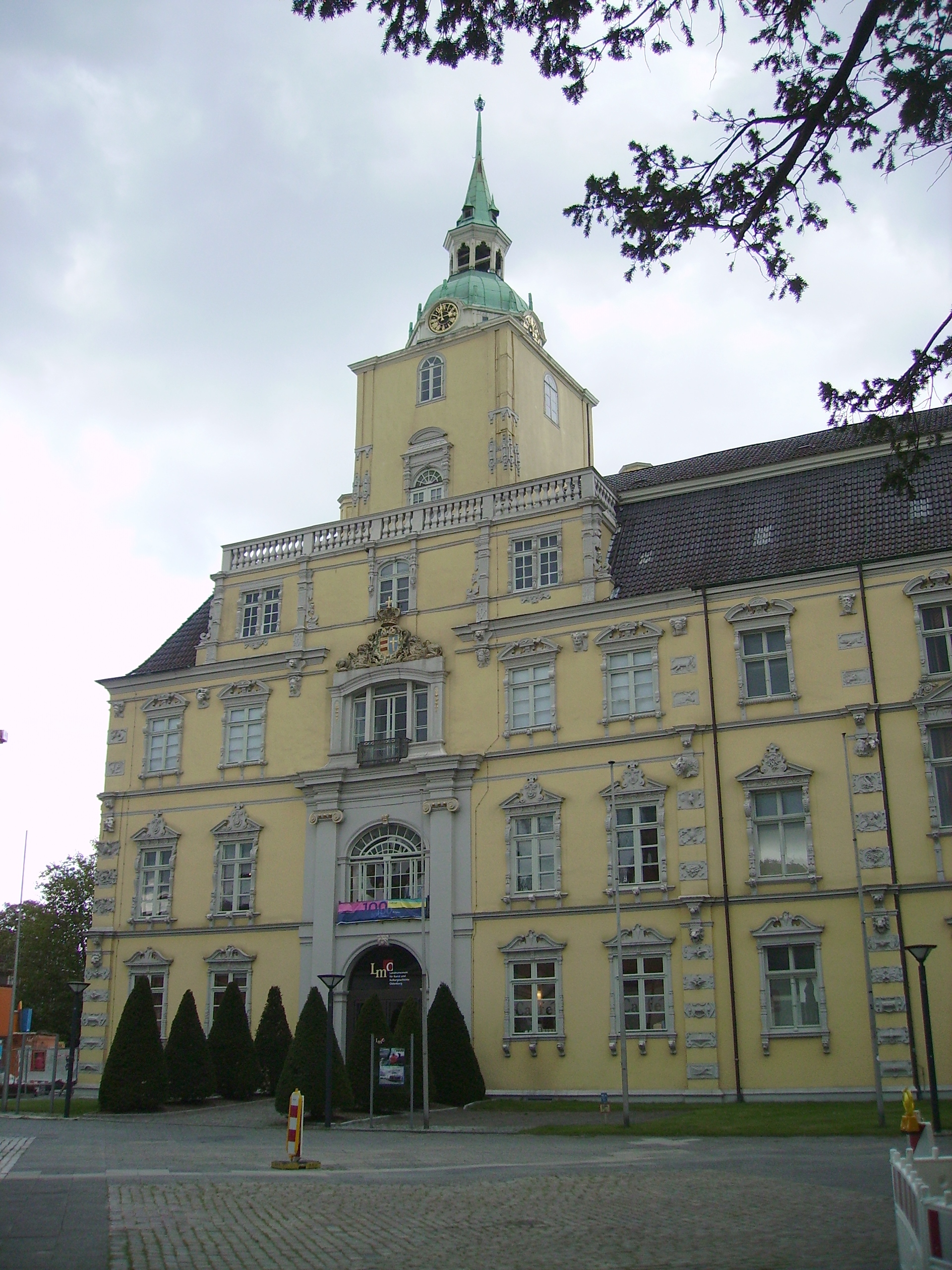
- Main entrance to the State Museum in Schloss Oldenburg
- Interactive fullscreen map
- Location: Oldenburg
- Coordinates: 53°08′16″N 8°12′59″E
- Type: art museum

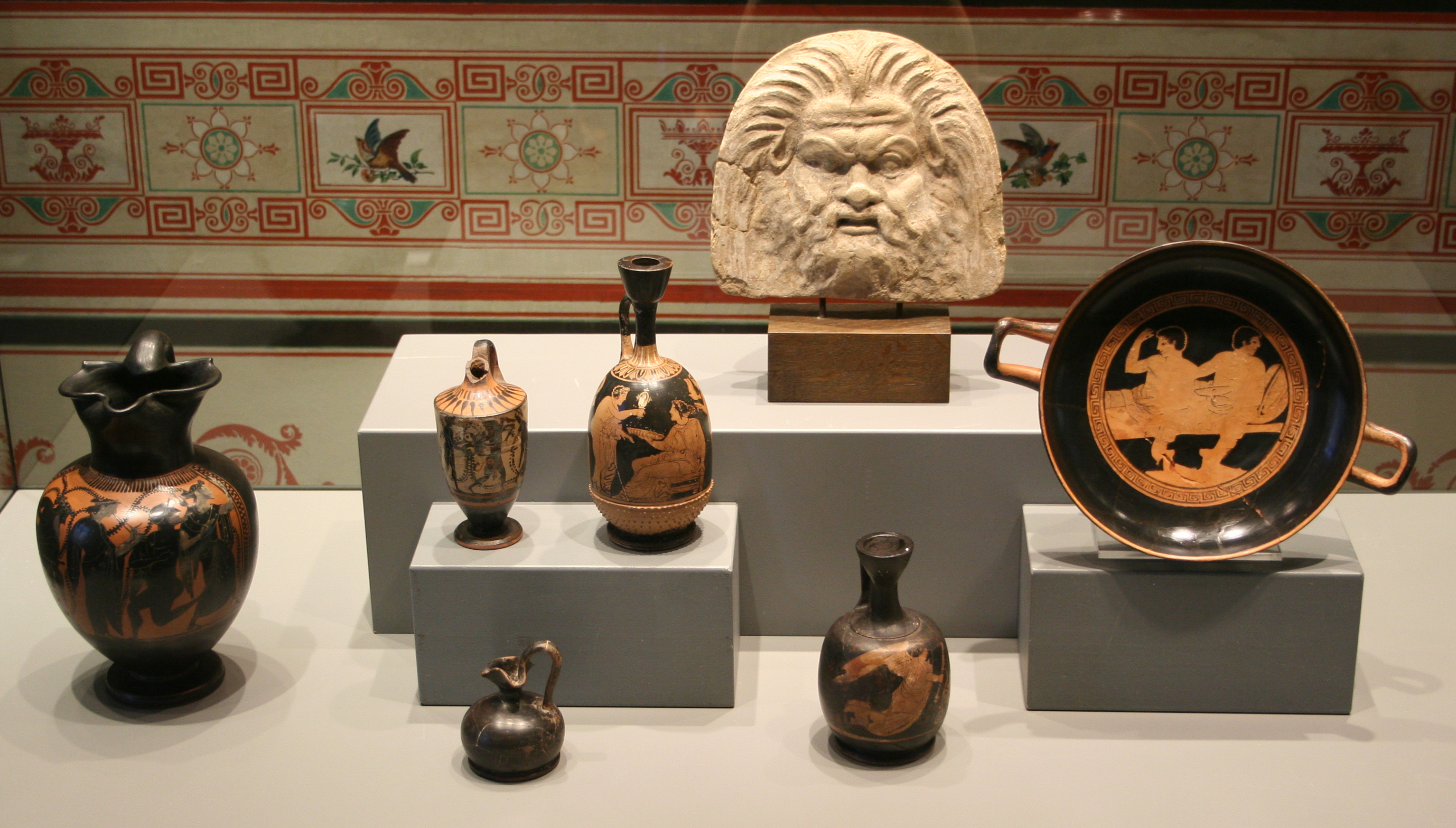
Ancient Greek pottery in the museum.

The State Museum for Art and Cultural History (in German: Landesmuseum für Kunst und Kulturgeschichte) is an art museum consisting of three separate buildings located close to each other in the city of Oldenburg, Lower Saxony, Germany.

The three museum locations are:

- Schloss Oldenburg (decorative arts, regional history, some old master paintings)
- Augusteum (old master painting collection)
- Prinzenpalais (modern art collection)

The museum was established in 1919 after the abdication the previous year of Frederick Augustus II, the last Grand Duke of Oldenburg. The initial collection consisted of the former Grand Duke's picture gallery, a collection of antiquities, and the collections of the Museum of Decorative Arts and the former National Picture Gallery.

The three buildings are all located close to the northeast corner of the Schlossgarten Oldenburg, now Oldenburg's main public park.

== See also ==
- List of visitor attractions in Oldenburg
