= Child from the Esterweger Dose =

Medieval skeletal bog body of a German adolescent

- Surviving bones of the Child from the Esterweger Dose, highlighted in red
- Born: Unknown
- Died: 1046–1164 CE (aged approximately 12–14); Unknown
- Body discovered: 27 February 1939; Esterweger Dose, near Burlage, Germany
- Resting place: Moor- und Fehnmuseum Elisabethfehn, Lower Saxony, Germany
- Other names: Boy of Burlage; Kind aus der Esterweger Dose; Junge von Burlage
- Known for: Medieval bog body with evidence of severe bone disease

The Child from the Esterweger Dose (German: Kind aus der Esterweger Dose), also known as the Boy of Burlage (German: Junge von Burlage), is the skeletal bog body of an adolescent who lived in what is now northwestern Germany during the High Middle Ages. Radiocarbon dating places his death between 1046 and 1164 CE, when he was approximately 12 to 14 years old. His skeletal features suggest that he was male, although this identification is not certain.

The remains were discovered on 27 February 1939 by peat worker Heinrich Breer in the Esterweger Dose, near Burlage in present-day Lower Saxony. Although most of the skeleton survived, centuries in the acidic peat had removed nearly all of the mineral content from the bones. Initially identified as an adult woman, the remains underwent a multidisciplinary investigation in 2010 that established the child's approximate age and probable sex. Researchers also identified advanced osteomyelitis, a serious bone infection, in his right shin and a separate disorder affecting his left hip. These conditions would have significantly impaired his ability to walk.

The child's exact cause of death remains unknown, although researchers considered the severe bone infection a likely explanation. His remains are preserved at the Moor- und Fehnmuseum Elisabethfehn, near the region where he was discovered.

== Discovery ==
The individual who became known as the Child from the Esterweger Dose was discovered on 27 February 1939, when peat worker Heinrich Breer was cutting white peat on the Moorgut Sedelsberg estate, in the municipality of Saterland. The site lay in the Esterweger Dose, near the village of Burlage in northwestern Germany. Breer's spade struck one of the child's bones, and he carefully uncovered further bones from the peat. The skeleton was almost complete.

Breer reported the discovery to the management of Moorgut Sedelsberg, and the find was subsequently reported to the museum in Oldenburg. By the time museum staff arrived, the child's remains had been removed from the bog and taken to the estate office. The peat around the discovery site had also been completely cut away, preventing the child's original position and immediate surroundings from being documented in situ.

== Condition ==
The child survived only as skeletal remains, without the preserved skin, hair or internal organs found in some other bog bodies. Most of the skeleton was recovered, although parts of the spine and rib cage, the hands and feet, the lower jaw, and the teeth were missing.

Centuries in the acidic peat had substantially altered the surviving bones. Their overall shape remained intact, but they had lost nearly all of their mineral content. Despite this pronounced demineralization, researchers described the skeleton's overall state of preservation as excellent.

== Scientific analysis ==
=== Age and sex ===
Early examinations identified the remains as those of an adult woman. In 2010, 71 years after the discovery, the skeleton was reassessed as part of a multidisciplinary investigation. Examination of the surviving skeleton indicated that the individual had died at about 12 to 14 years of age. Researchers also identified skeletal features suggesting that the child was male, although they regarded the sex determination as probable rather than certain.

=== Body and health ===
His skeleton showed no clear evidence that he had experienced nutritional deprivation, but it preserved evidence of significant disease and physical impairment.

By the time of his death in the 11th or 12th century CE, the child had developed advanced osteomyelitis in his right tibia. Palaeopathologist Michael Schultz and colleagues found that the infection had destroyed areas of existing bone while also causing new bone to form. A fistula, or channel through which infection could drain, had developed through the affected bone.

The child's left hip was also affected by a separate condition. The head of his left femur, where the thigh bone meets the hip, was markedly deformed. Researchers identified changes characteristic of advanced Legg–Calvé–Perthes disease, a childhood disorder in which disruption of the blood supply damages the head of the femur. Together, the conditions affecting his legs would have significantly impaired his mobility. Researchers concluded that he probably walked with a pronounced limp.

The child's skeleton also indicated that he was right-handed.

=== Date ===
The remains were first dated in 1956, 17 years after their discovery, using pollen analysis of the surrounding peat. This analysis placed the child in the 11th or 12th century CE.

In the 1990s, more than 50 years after the remains were found, researchers used accelerator mass spectrometry (AMS) radiocarbon dating to date a sample of the child's bone directly. Analysis of collagen extracted from the bone produced a radiocarbon age of 900 ± 45 years BP, corresponding to a calibrated date range of 1050–1200 CE.

The dating was reassessed during the multidisciplinary investigation published in 2010, 71 years after the discovery. Using updated radiocarbon calibration data, researchers narrowed the estimated date to 1046–1164 CE, placing the child's death in the High Middle Ages.

== Cause of death ==
The child's exact cause of death is unknown. He died at about 12 to 14 years of age in the 11th or 12th century CE. Palaeopathologist Michael Schultz and colleagues identified advanced osteomyelitis, a serious infection of the bone and bone marrow, in the child's right tibia. The disease had destroyed areas of bone, caused new bone to form, and produced a fistula, or channel through which infection could drain. Because of the severity of the disease, the researchers considered the osteomyelitis the most likely explanation for his early death.

Schultz noted that before the development of antibiotics, a bone infection of this severity could spread into the bloodstream and cause fatal sepsis. He considered this a possible explanation for the child's death, although the surviving remains cannot establish that this occurred.

== Museum history and exhibition ==
After the child's remains were recovered in 1939, they entered the collection of the natural history and archaeology museum in Oldenburg, now known as the Landesmuseum Natur und Mensch. The remains were recorded under inventory number 5775.

In March 2005, 66 years after the discovery, the child returned to the region where he had been found. His remains were displayed at the Moor- und Fehnmuseum Elisabethfehn in a climate-controlled case, designed to regulate temperature and humidity around the fragile bones. The display formed part of the exhibition Esterweger Dose gestern und heute ("Esterweger Dose Yesterday and Today") and continued until March 2009.

Following the multidisciplinary reinvestigation of the remains in 2010, the child was exhibited again in Oldenburg. From May to August 2011, 72 years after the discovery, the remains appeared in O, schaurig ist's, übers Moor zu gehn ..., an exhibition at the Landesmuseum Natur und Mensch about bog archaeology and bog bodies. The exhibition followed research that had substantially changed the interpretation of the child, including his estimated age and probable sex.

The remains later returned to the Moor- und Fehnmuseum Elisabethfehn, near the Esterweger Dose. The child is now displayed there as part of the museum's permanent exhibition on bog archaeology.
