= Prinzenpalais, Oldenburg =

Museum in Germany

Coordinates: 53°08′11″N 8°13′04″E

Another view of the building from the west.

The Prinzenpalais is a palace, now used as an art museum, in the city of Oldenburg, Lower Saxony, Germany. The museum houses the modern art collection of the State Museum for Art and Cultural History.

The building dates from 1826 and is in the classical style. It was the residence of the Russian princes Alexander and Peter. Subsequently Grand Duke Niklaus Friedrich Peter occupied the building. In 2003, it became part of the State Museum of Art and Cultural History (with the Augusteum and Schloss Oldenburg) and is an art gallery. The museum concentrates on German artists, ranging from neoclassicism and Romanticism in the mid-19th century to the post-1945 era. The Prinzenpalais building is near the northeast corner of the Schlossgarten Oldenburg. The Augusteum, Elisabeth-Anna-Palais, and Schloss Oldenburg are all close to the museum.

== See also ==
- Augusteum (Oldenburg), another art gallery close to the Prinzenpalais
- List of visitor attractions in Oldenburg
- State Museum for Art and Cultural History
