= Schloss Oldenburg =

Schloss, or palace, in Oldenburg, Germany

Coordinates: 53°08′16″N 8°13′00″E

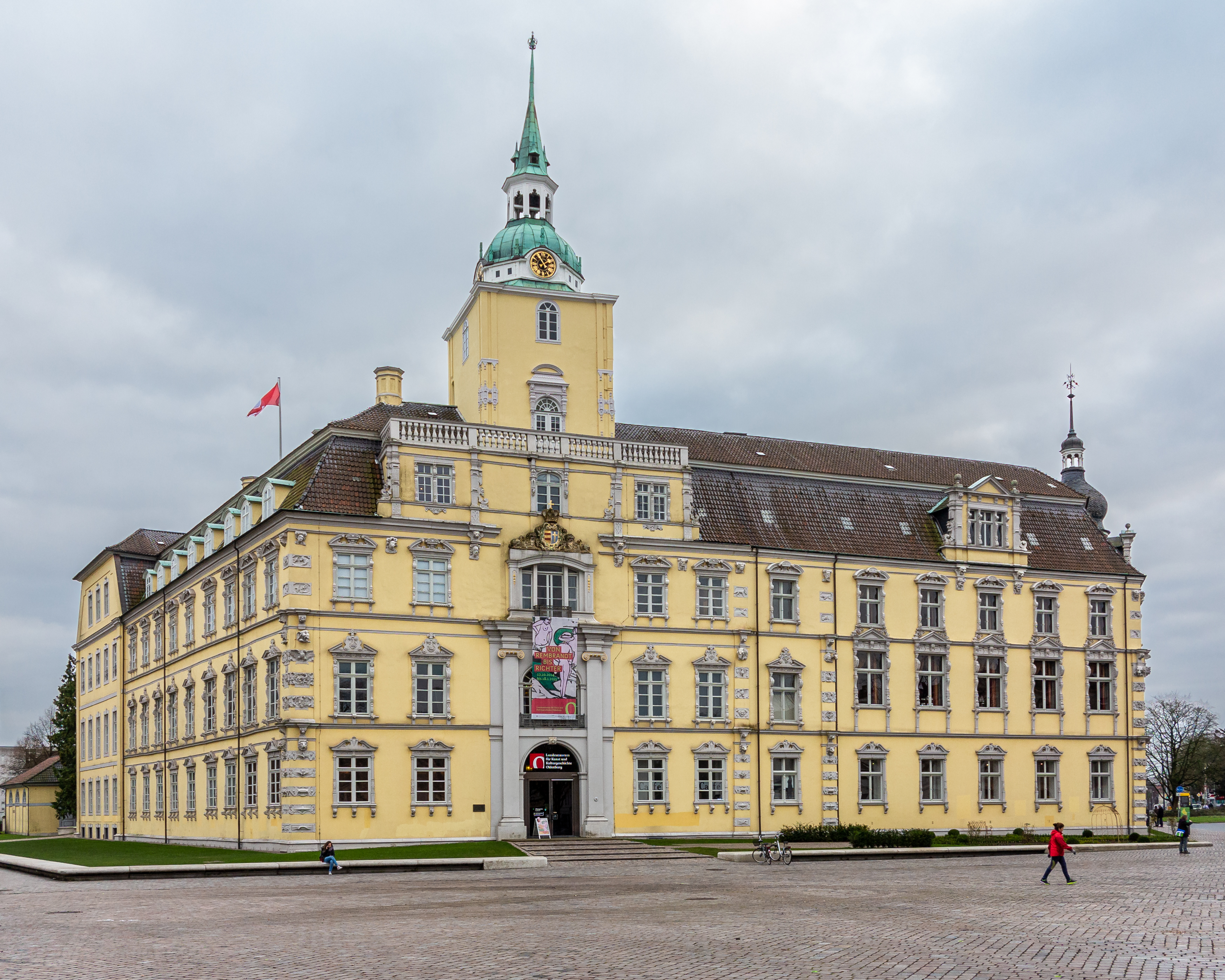
Oldenburg Palace

Schloss Oldenburg (Oldenburg palace) is a schloss, or palace, in the city of Oldenburg in the present-day state of Lower Saxony, Germany. The first castle on the site was built around 1100 and became the ancestral home of the House of Oldenburg. The present building served as residence to the counts (1667–1785), dukes (1785–1815) and grand dukes (1815–1918) of Oldenburg.

The building now houses part of the State Museum for Art and Cultural History, especially its decorative arts and local history exhibitions, as well as some old master paintings. Immediately outside the palace to the west and north is the Schlossplatz. Opposite it, to the north, is the Schlosshöfe shopping mall, opened in 2011. To the south are the Prinzenpalais and Augusteum, also part of the State Museum for Art and Cultural History. To the southwest is the Elisabeth-Anna-Palais, adjacent to the Schlossgarten Oldenburg, the main public park in Oldenburg.

== History ==
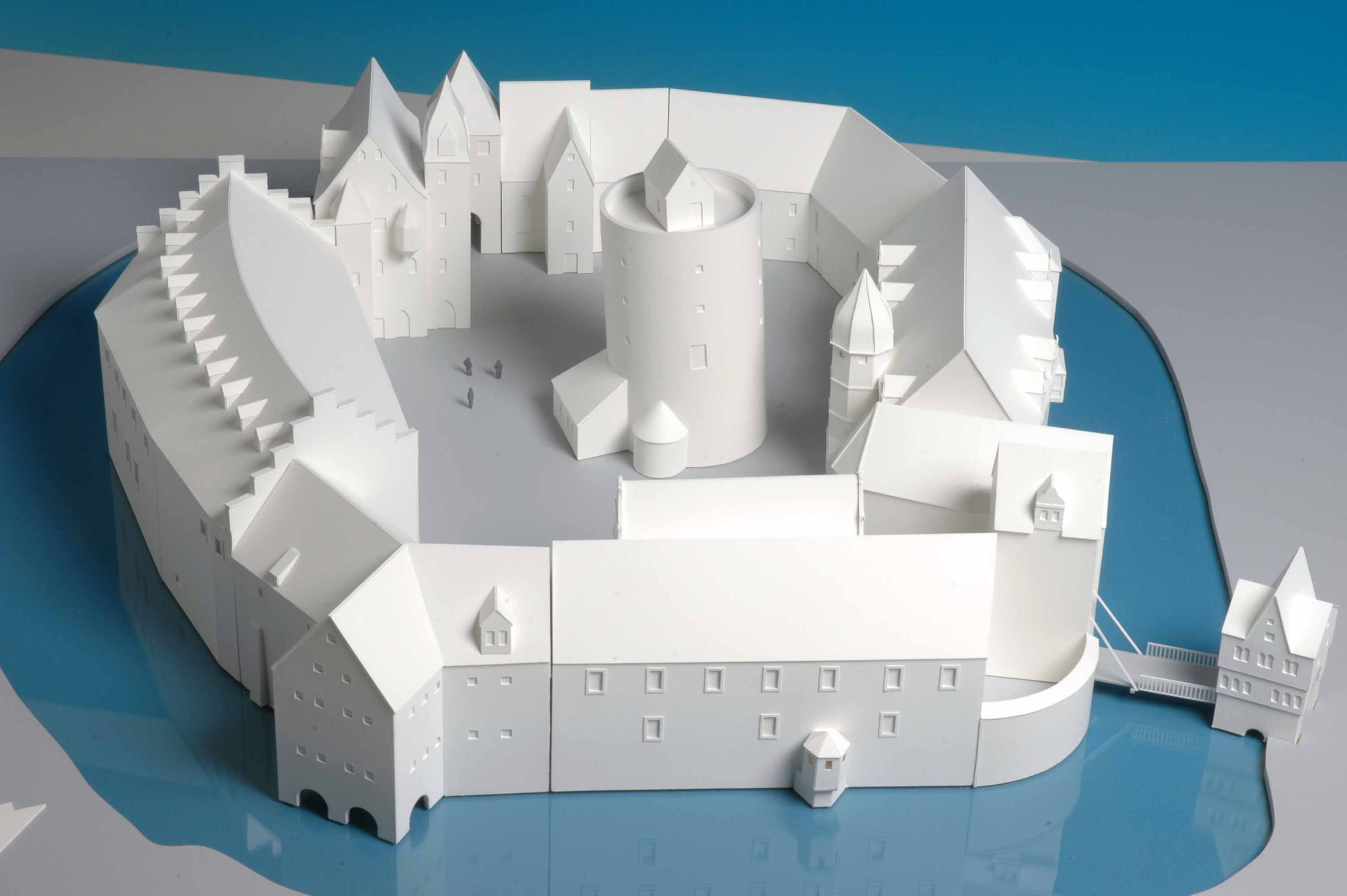
Model of Oldenburg Castle around 1400

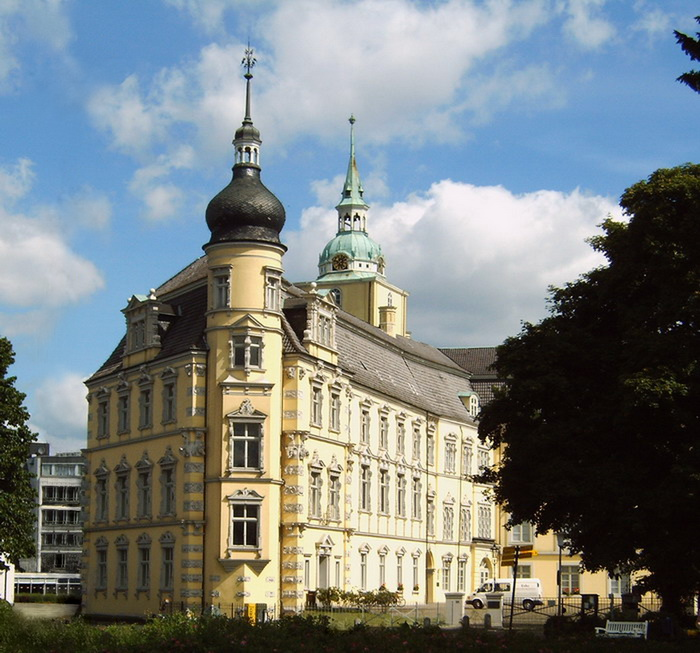
Schloss Oldenburg, west wing.

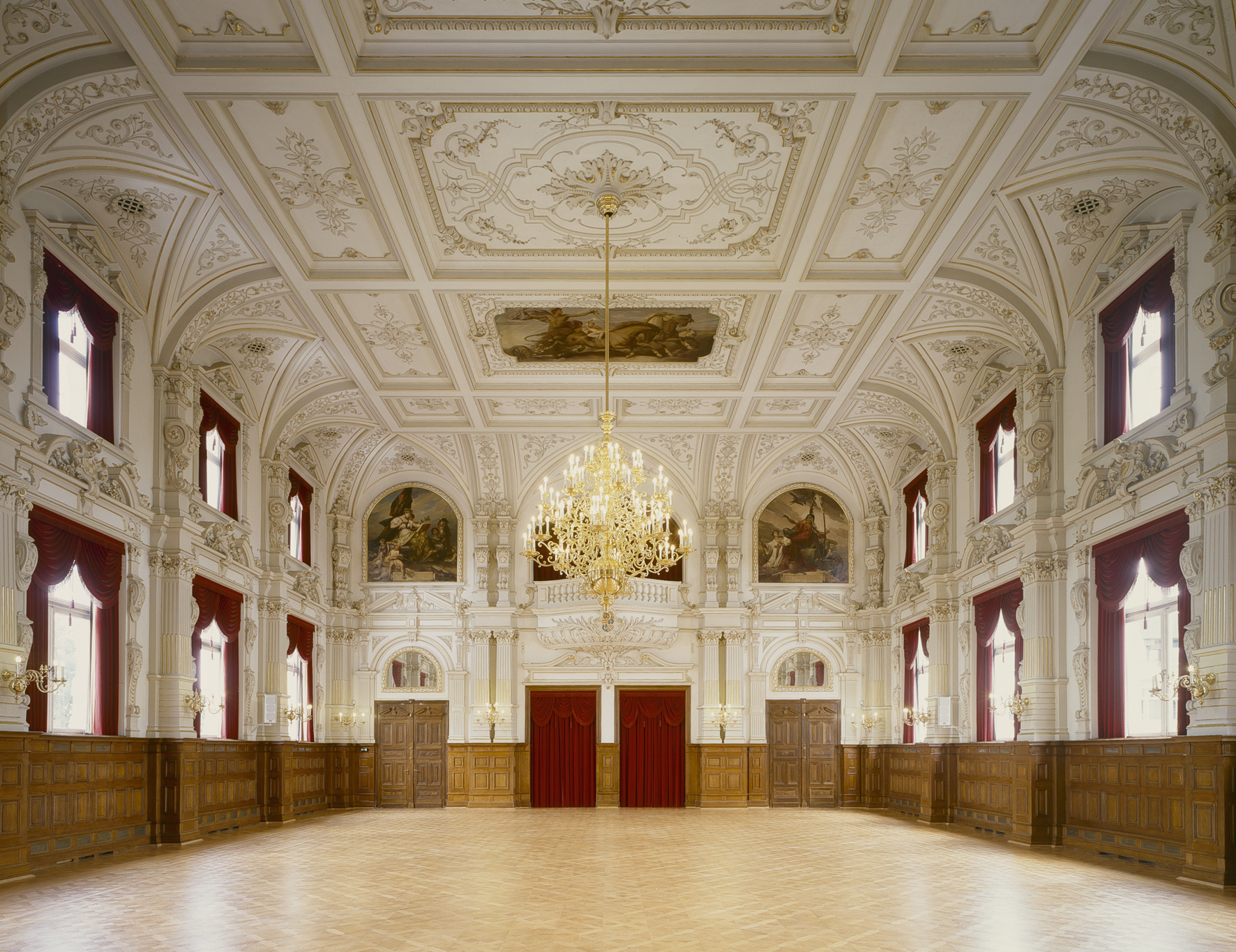
The Main Hall.

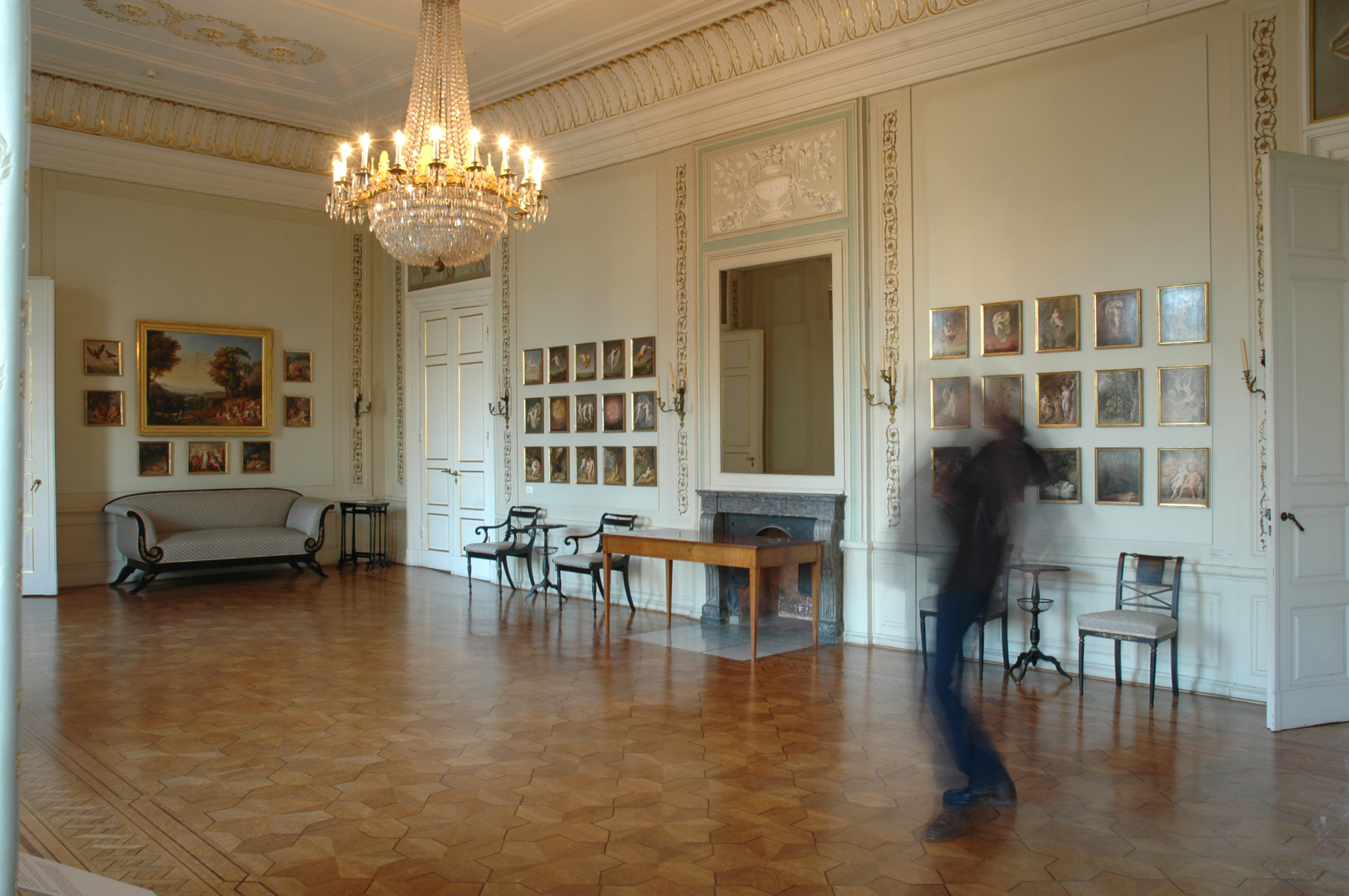
Idyllenzimmer (Idylls Room), with the cycle of idylls by court painter Johann Heinrich Wilhelm Tischbein

The palace is based on a medieval lowland castle that was built around 1100 by the Counts of Oldenburg to control a long-distance trade route from Westphalia to East Frisia. The name of Elimar I, Count of Oldenburg, was first mentioned in 1108, the building itself was explicitly mentioned for the first time in 1275, and a keep appears in a document in 1313. At that time, the individual buildings had to be founded on piles made of oak. Around 1400, under Dietrich, Count of Oldenburg, the complex, which was laid out in the round, was given a ring moat with an outer wall and thus became a moated castle. Numerous residential and farm buildings were gathered in a small area, which around 1600 housed a court with around 350 people. In 1573 the castle was considered dilapidated and was therefore renovated bit by bit. The keep in the middle of the courtyard had already taken an inclined position in 1599 due to the muddy subsoil and was therefore demolished in 1608.

At the beginning of the 17th century, Anthony Günther, Count of Oldenburg (1583–1667) planned the conversion of the heavily nested buildings into a regular four-wing complex based on the model of Italian city palazzi. In 1607 master builder Anton Reinhardt started with the first masonry work. His successor in office from 1609 to 1615 was the architect Andrea Spezza (1580–c. 1628) from Arogno in Ticino, Switzerland. The sculptor Ludwig Münstermann (c. 1575-1638) was involved in the development of the Renaissance-style façade. However, the ambitious project came to a standstill at the latest at the beginning of the Thirty Years' War for cost reasons.

After Anthony Günther's death without a legitimate heir, most of his land fell into the hands of the elder line of the House of Oldenburg, the Danish royal family, who are direct male descendants of Christian I, Count of Oldenburg, elected as King of Denmark in 1448. For more than a hundred years, the county was governed in personal union with Denmark. During this period, a Danish governor resided in the castle. The last remains of the medieval castle had to be removed in the 18th century due to dilapidation. On this occasion, most of the moat was also filled in. In 1744, the Danish government added a simple annexe for the state administration ("chancellery wing") to the core building of Count Anthony Günther.

In 1773, the Holstein-Gottorf branch of the House of Oldenburg took over control of the newly created Duchy of Oldenburg until 1860. When the Gottorf dukes came to power, an extension with a ballroom appeared necessary for representative reasons. From 1817, Peter I, Grand Duke of Oldenburg (1755–1829) had the interior of the palace modernized under the supervision of the neoclassical master builder Heinrich Carl Slevogt (1787–1832) and added a further wing for the court kitchen and library as well as two coach houses. This "library wing" burned down in 1913, but was immediately rebuilt in its old form. In 1894 the Danish "chancellery wing" had to be demolished due to dilapidation. In its place, architect Ludwig Freese (1859-1916) created a stylistic continuation of the Anthony Günther grand piano in the taste of historicism based on a design by Ludwig Klingenberg (1840-1924). The core of this new building is the large palace hall in neo-Renaissance style with ceiling paintings by the Bremen painter Arthur Fitger (1840-1909).

By 1894, the palace was the residence of the hereditary Grand Duke Friedrich August (1852–1931). He abdicated as reigning Grand Duke during the November Revolution of 1918 and moved to his country seat Rastede Palace. In 1919–20 the palace was transformed into the Landesmuseum Oldenburg (Museum of the State of Oldenburg) by the Government of the State of Oldenburg. It was transferred to public ownership in 1923.

== See also ==
- Counts, dukes and grand dukes of Oldenburg
- State Museum for Art and Cultural History
- List of visitor attractions in Oldenburg
