= Augusteum =

Site of imperial cult in ancient Roman religion

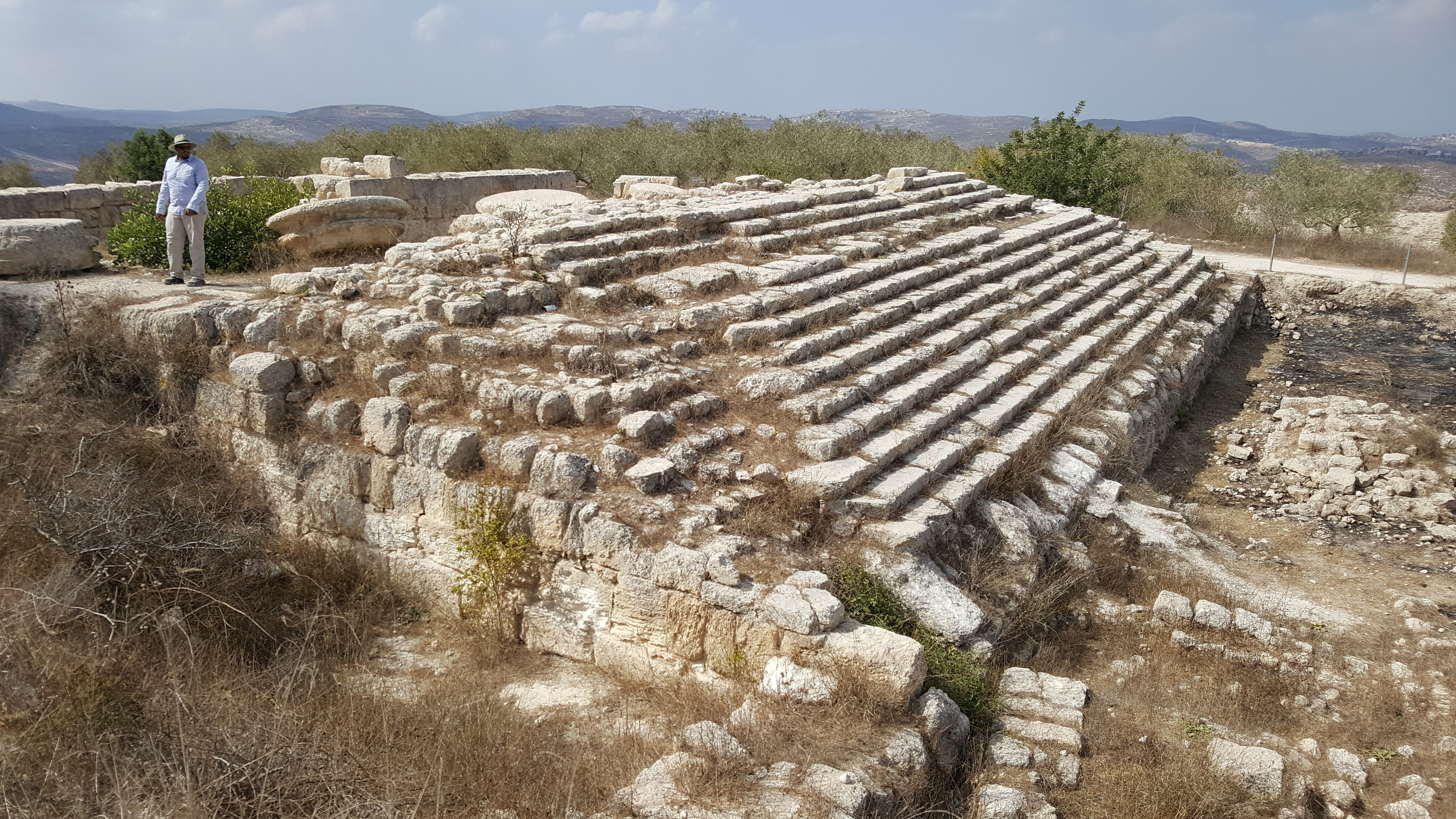
Sebastia/Shomron/Samaria. Originally 25 metres high, the remaining base of the Augusteum temple at the summit of the Samaria hilltop.

An Augusteum (plural Augustea) was originally a site of imperial cult in ancient Roman religion, named after the imperial title of Augustus. It was known as a Sebasteion in the Greek East of the Roman Empire. Examples have been excavated in Sebaste/Samaria, Constantinople, Aphrodisias, Antioch, Cartagena and (most famously) Ankara (Temple of Augustus and Rome).

== Notable examples ==
- Herculaneum Augusteum: it is situated in the unexcavated forum area in the north-western corner of the archaeological site of Herculaneum.
- Pisidian Antioch: the temple of Augustus or the sanctuary of the imperial cult.
- Ostia Antica Augusteum: remains of the augusteum at Ostia are situated inside the barracks of the fire brigade located in the north-eastern flank of the archaeological site.
- Temple of Augustus and Rome in Ankara:
- Sebastia Augusteum:
- Augusteum of Constantinople
- Aphrodisias Sebasteion: The Sebasteion of Aphrodisias, built during the 1st century CE, is a monumental sanctuary dedicated to the imperial cult and the gods. Known for its elaborate reliefs and sculptural decorations, it celebrated the Julio-Claudian emperors, depicting scenes that merged Greco-Roman mythology with imperial propaganda.
- Messene Sebasteion
- Temple of Augustus and Rome, Athens Acropolis

== Modern usage of the term augusteum ==
Since the 18th century, the term has also been used for certain academic and cultural buildings, such as the Augustea in Leipzig, Oldenburg and Wittenberg.

== See also ==
- Mausoleum of Augustus, Rome

== External Resources ==
- Photos of notable sebasteia with brief descriptions
- Photos of notable augustea with brief descriptions
