= Elisabeth-Anna-Palais =

Coordinates: 53°08′13″N 08°12′55″E

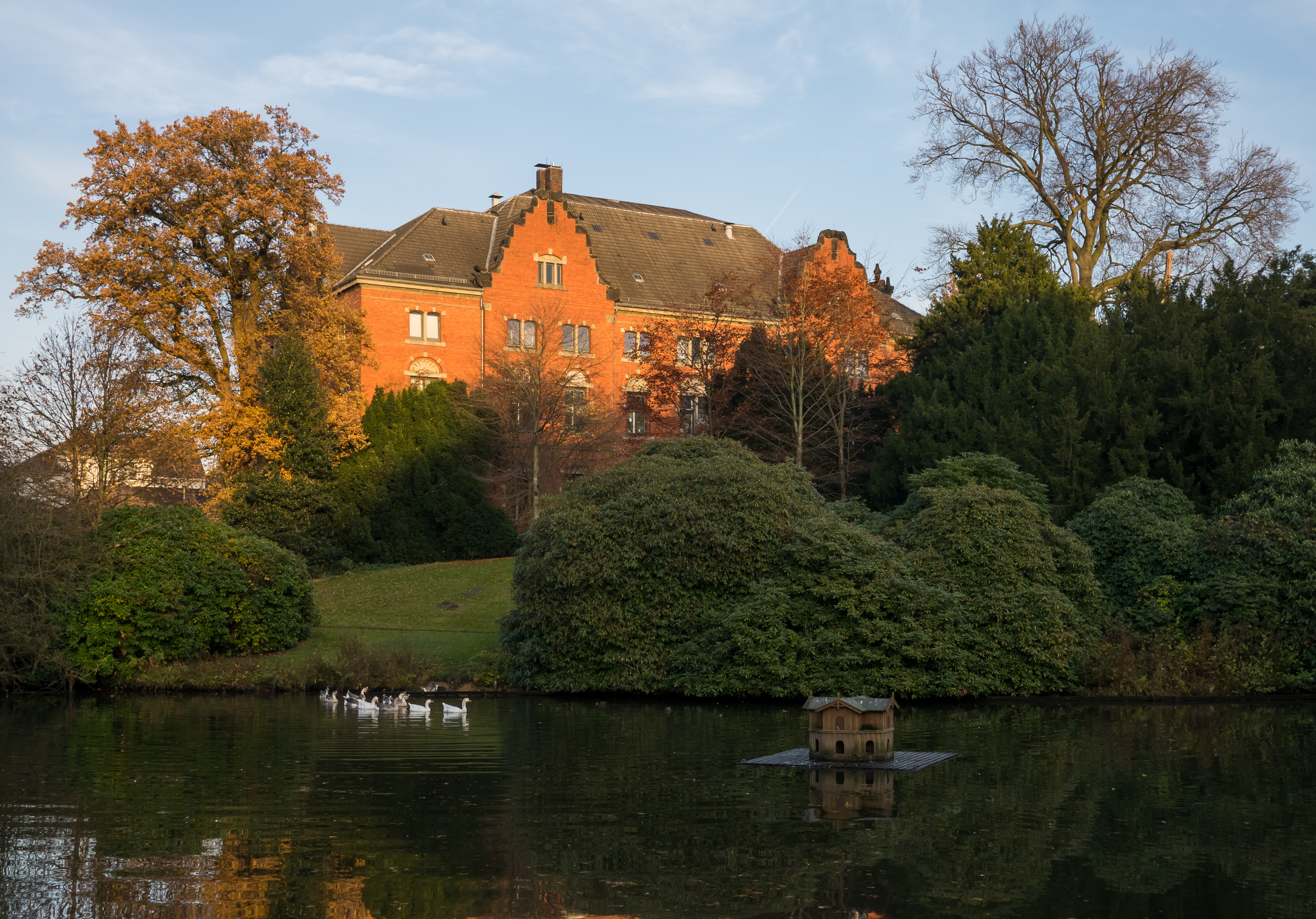
The Elisabeth-Anna-Palais from the Schlossgarten.

The Elisabeth-Anna-Palais is a secular red-brick building in Oldenburg, Lower Saxony, Germany, located at the northeast of the Schlossgarten Oldenburg, close to the Schloss Oldenburg.

== History ==
Usually the ducal family resided in Schloss Oldenburg, but Frederick Augustus (from 1900 the last ruling grand duke of Oldenburg) decided to build this as their new home, on a site now between the Schloss and the Augusteum. It was built between 1894 and 1896 to plans by the duke's chief architect Ludwig Freese. Its design imitates Baroque architecture and its southeastern corner (today its left-hand entrance) has an onion-dome-topped tower. During construction Frederick Augustus's wife Princess Elisabeth Anna of Prussia (1857–95) died, and the new building was named in her memory. On 24 October 1896, Frederick Augustus moved into the new residence with his family and his second wife Duchess Elisabeth Alexandrine of Mecklenburg-Schwerin (born 1869, daughter of Frederick Francis II, Grand Duke of Mecklenburg-Schwerin).

However, revolutionaries forced the Grand Duke to raise the red flag from the flagpoles of the Palais and the Schloss on 8 November 1918 and three days later he renounced his dukedom and retired to his Schloss Rastede at Rastede. After his resignation, the Palais was used for other purposes. The kitchen wing to the east of the main building was demolished in the early 1960s to make room for the new "Schlosswall" street, though the Palais was now sited right on this new road and thus gained a new entrance. The Palais now houses the Sozialgericht Oldenburg.
