= Augusteum, Oldenburg =

Art museum in Oldenburg, Germany

Augusteum
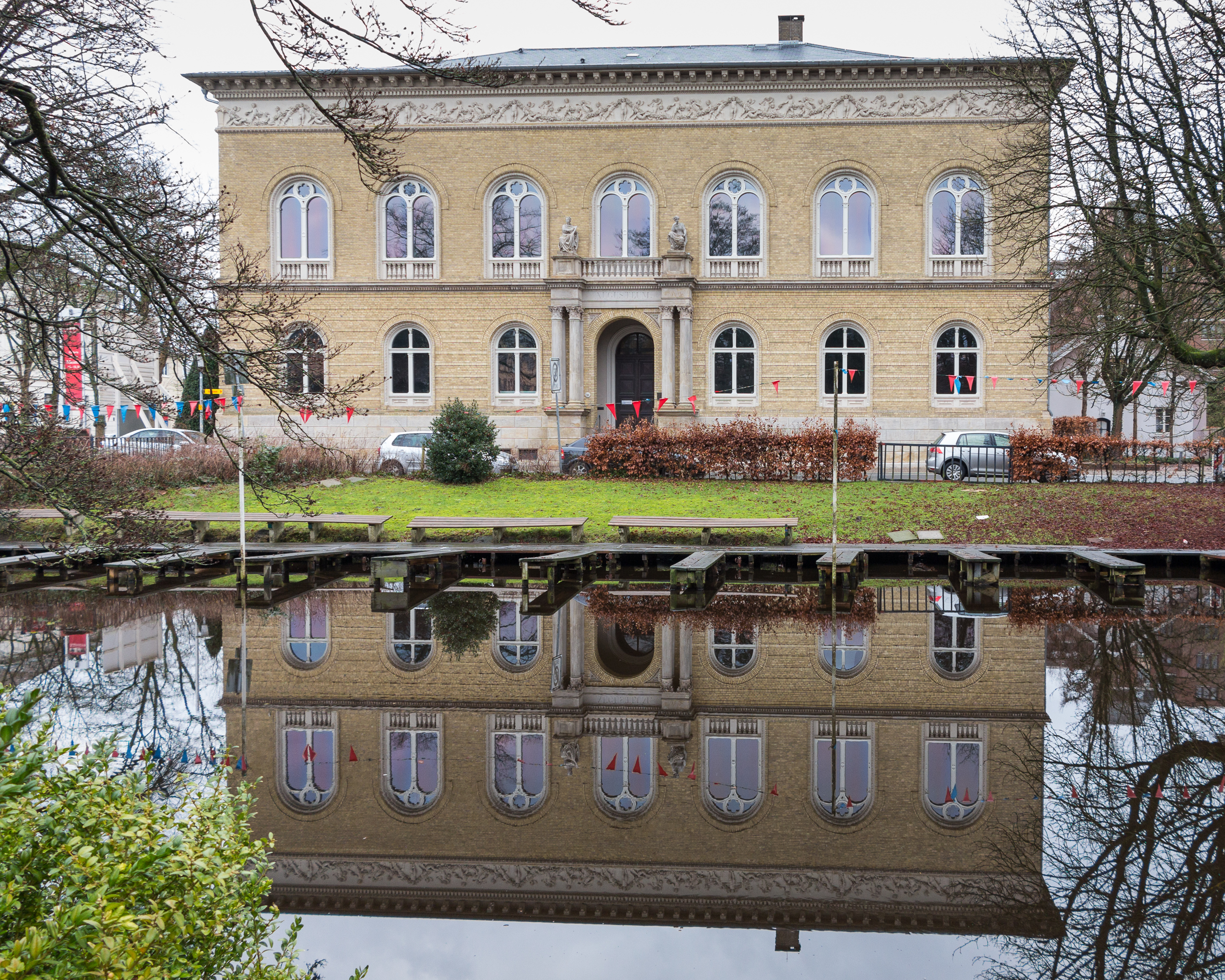
- The Augusteum in 2014
- Established: 1876
- Location: Oldenburg, Lower Saxony, Germany
- Coordinates: 53°08′10″N 8°13′00″E
- Type: Art
- Founder: Peter II, Grand Duke of Oldenburg

The Augusteum is a German art museum in the city of Oldenburg, Lower Saxony. Completed in 1867 in Oldenburg, the Augusteum is among the first museum buildings in northern Germany. Located at Elisabethstraße 1, it hosts the ‘Old Masters Gallery’ or old master painting collection of the Oldenburg State Museum of Art and Cultural History, featuring Dutch, Italian, German, and French paintings from the 15th to 18th centuries.

== History ==
The museum building was commissioned by Peter II, Grand Duke of Oldenburg (1827-1900) in 1873 to house the grand ducal art collection and named in honour of his father, Augustus, Grand Duke of Oldenburg. Designed in the Florentine palace style by architect Ernst Klingenberg (1830-1918), the building is in the neo-Renaissance style decorated with a grand staircase with paintings by Christian Griepenkerl, all commissioned by the Grand Duke. In addition to hosting the grand ducal collection, the building also served as an exhibition space for the Oldenburg Art Association and was opened in 1876 as Oldenburg's first art museum. The conservator Richard tom Dieck lived and worked on-site in the basement.

The foundation of the museum's collection was laid in 1804 when Duke Peter I of Oldenburg acquired 86 paintings from the private collection of artist Johann Heinrich Wilhelm Tischbein. Grand Duke Peter II further expanded the collection and established the Augusteum as a public picture gallery. In 1908, the Expressionists Karl Schmidt-Rottluff and Erich Heckel held their first joint exhibition at the Augusteum.

The Augusteum functioned as a public museum until 1918, when Peter II's son Frederick Augustus II was forced to abdicate. In 1919, following his abdication, Frederick Augustus left for the Netherlands and was soon forced to consider selling. In a series of sales, a third of the former Grand Ducal Picture Gallery was sold off, which was exported to the Netherlands with the assistance of industrialist Georg Bölts. These works included valuable paintings by notable artists, such as Rembrandt van Rijn.

The town was subsequently left with works of secondary importance. The curators have been buying back works since then, a task that continues to this day.

The Augusteum presents old master artworks near the northeast corner of the Schlossgarten Oldenburg. The Prinzenpalais, Elisabeth-Anna-Palais, and Schloss Oldenburg are also close by.

== Grand staircase ==
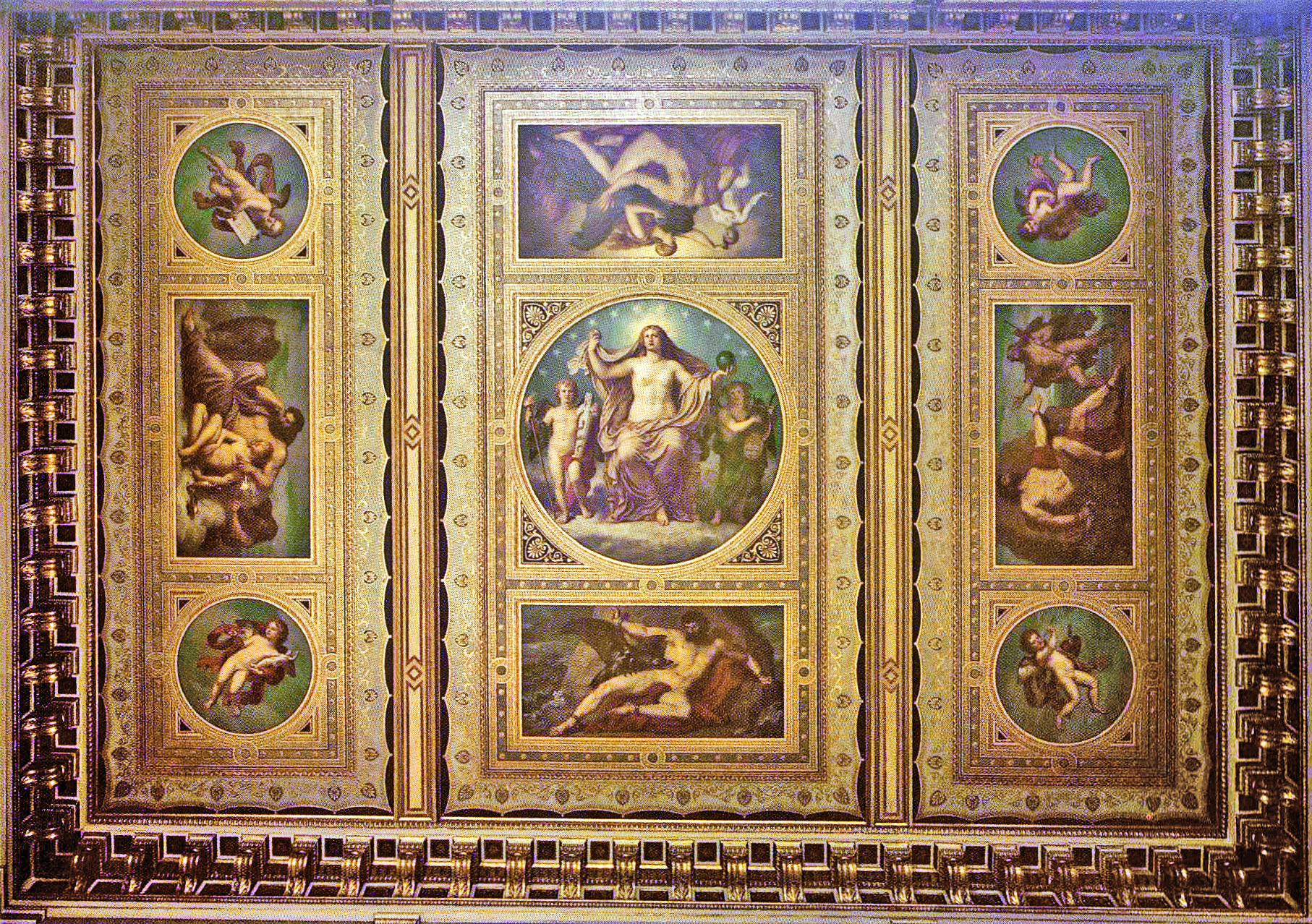
Ceiling

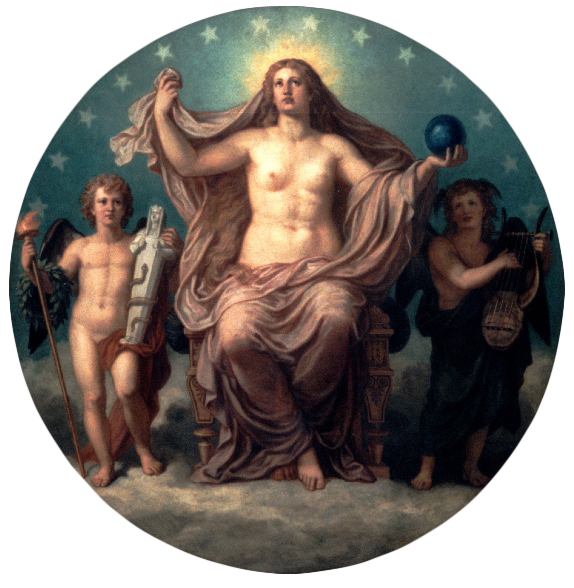
Venus Urania

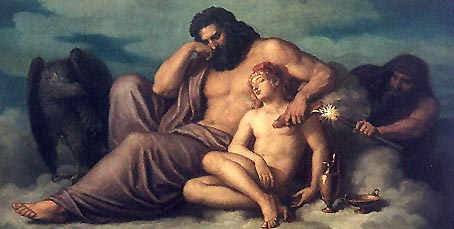
Prometheus stiehlt das Feuer vom schlafenden Zeus und Ganymed
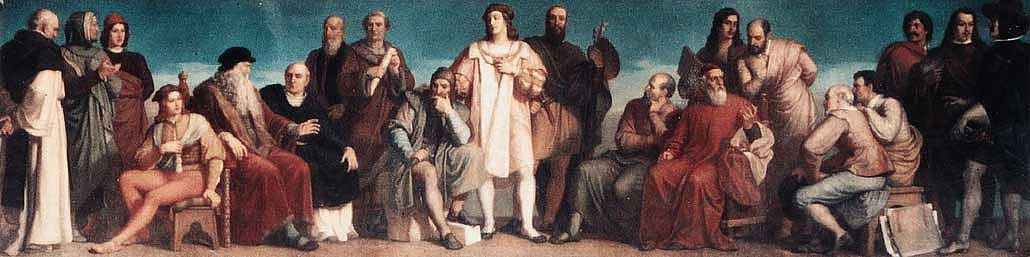
Fresco an der Stirnseite des Treppenhauses mit Abbildung der „Kunstheroen“ Ernst Willers, Carl Rahl, Theophil von Hansen und Christian Griepenkerl im Selbstporträt

== Paintings in the gallery ==
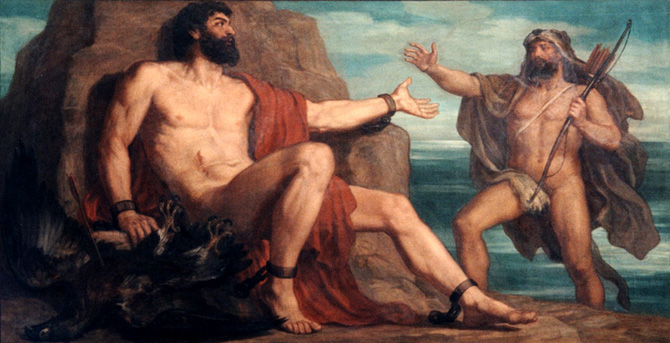
Herkules befreit Prometheus

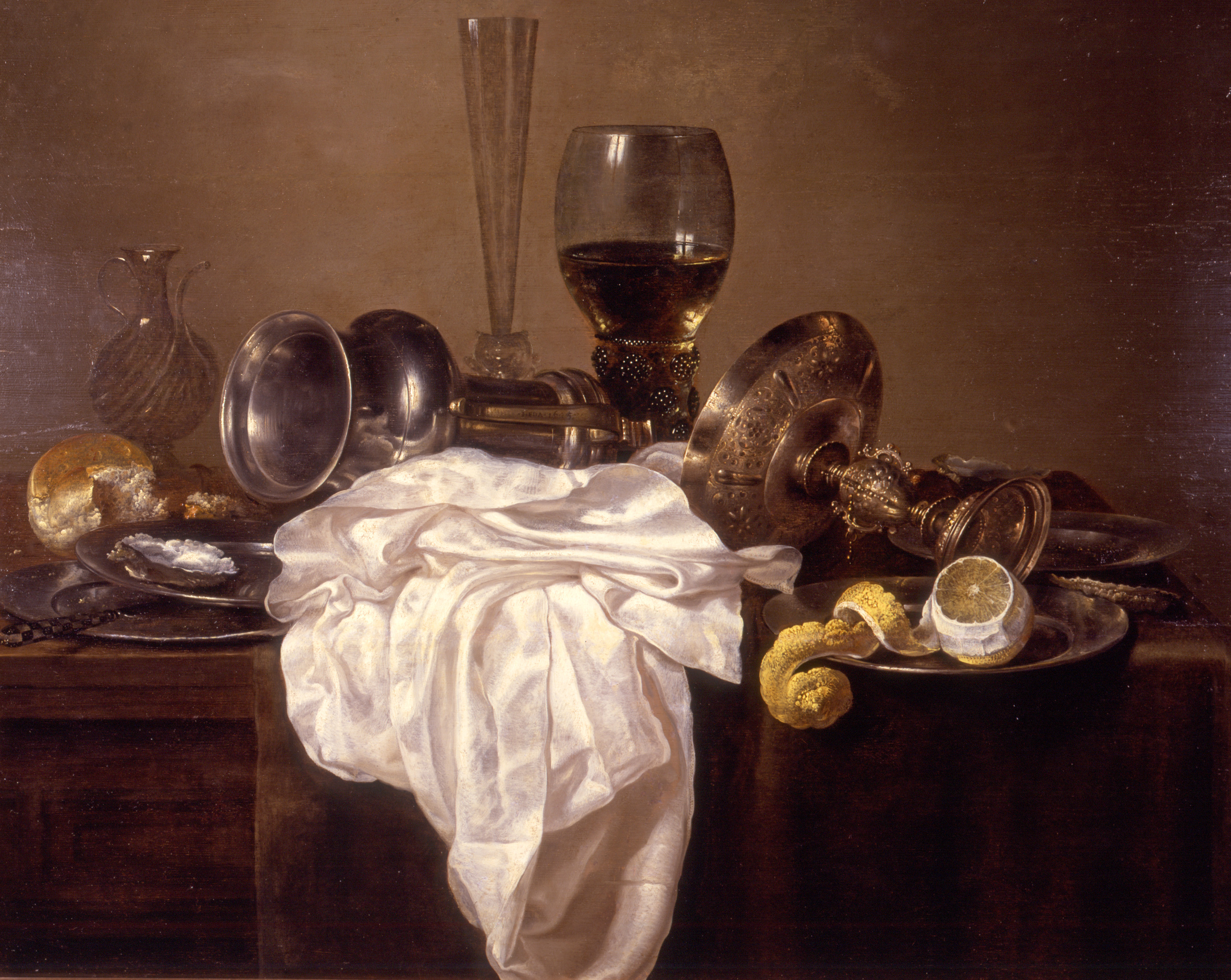
Frühstücksstillleben (Gerrit Willemsz. Heda, 1645)

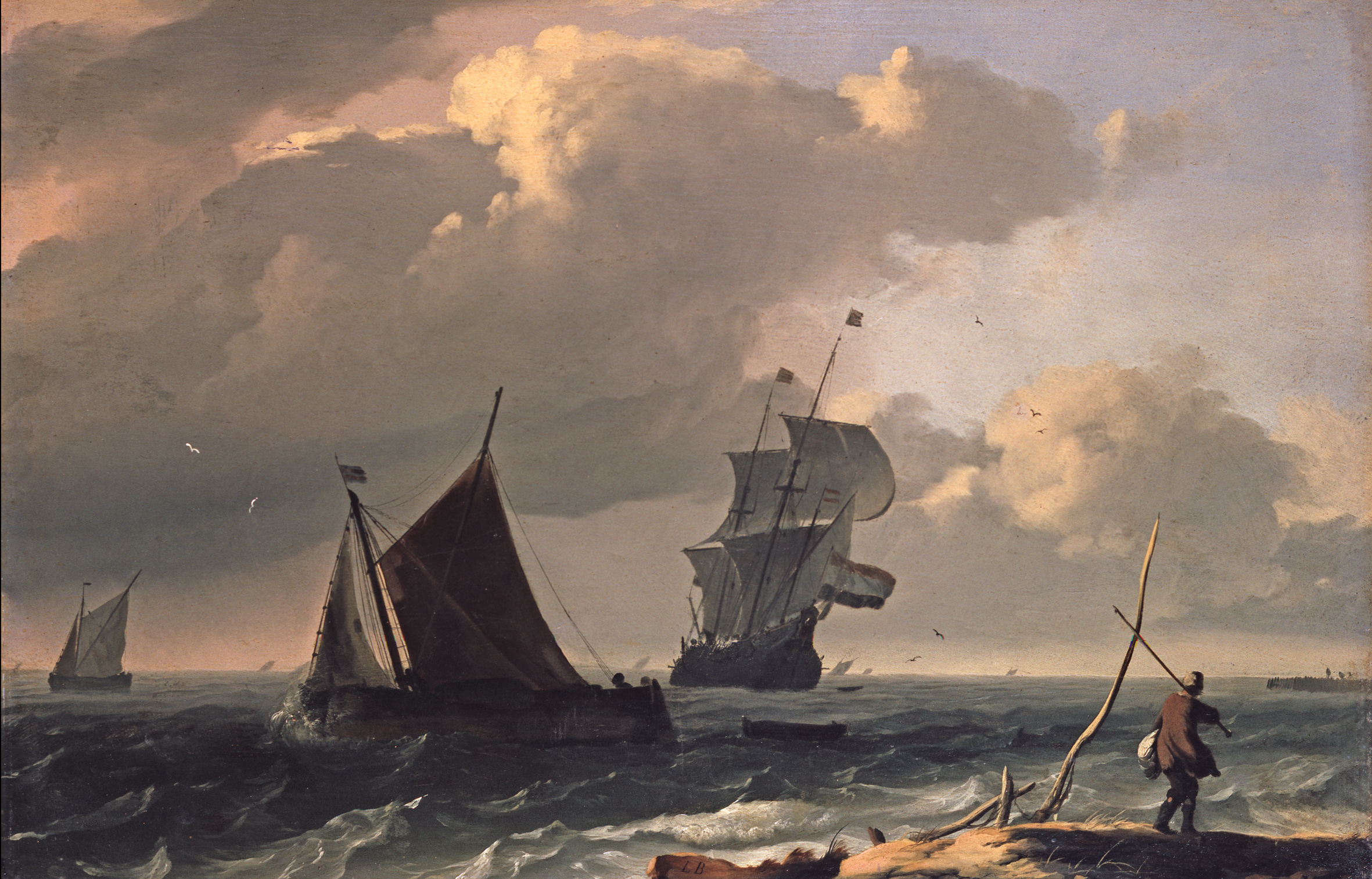
Bewegte See mit Schiffen (Ludolf Backhuysen, nach 1680)

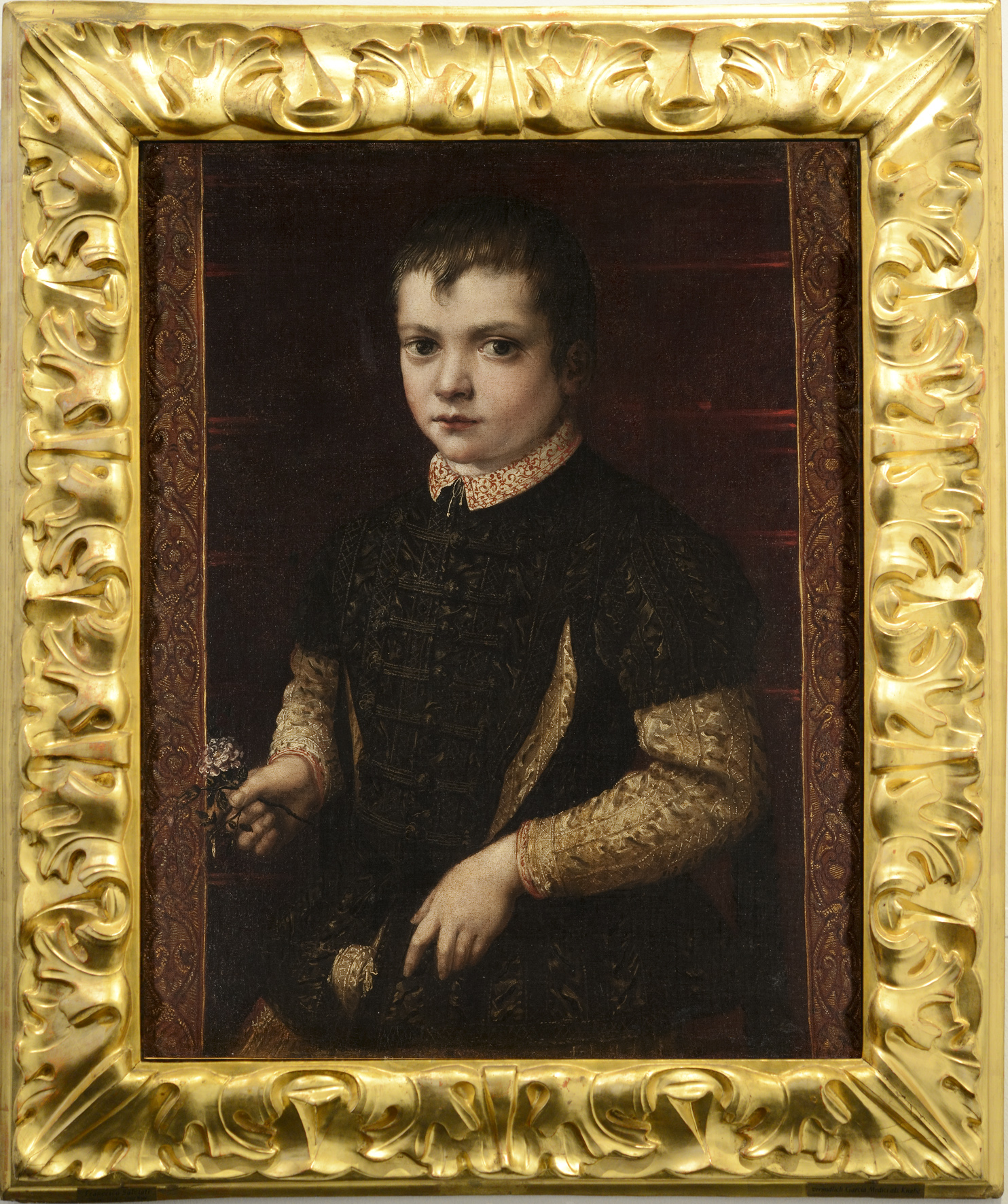
Bildnis eines Knaben (Francesco Salviati, nach 1541)

== See also ==
- Augusteum
- List of visitor attractions in Oldenburg
