= Schlossgarten (Oldenburg) =

Park in Oldenburg

Coordinates: 53°08′04″N 08°12′42″E

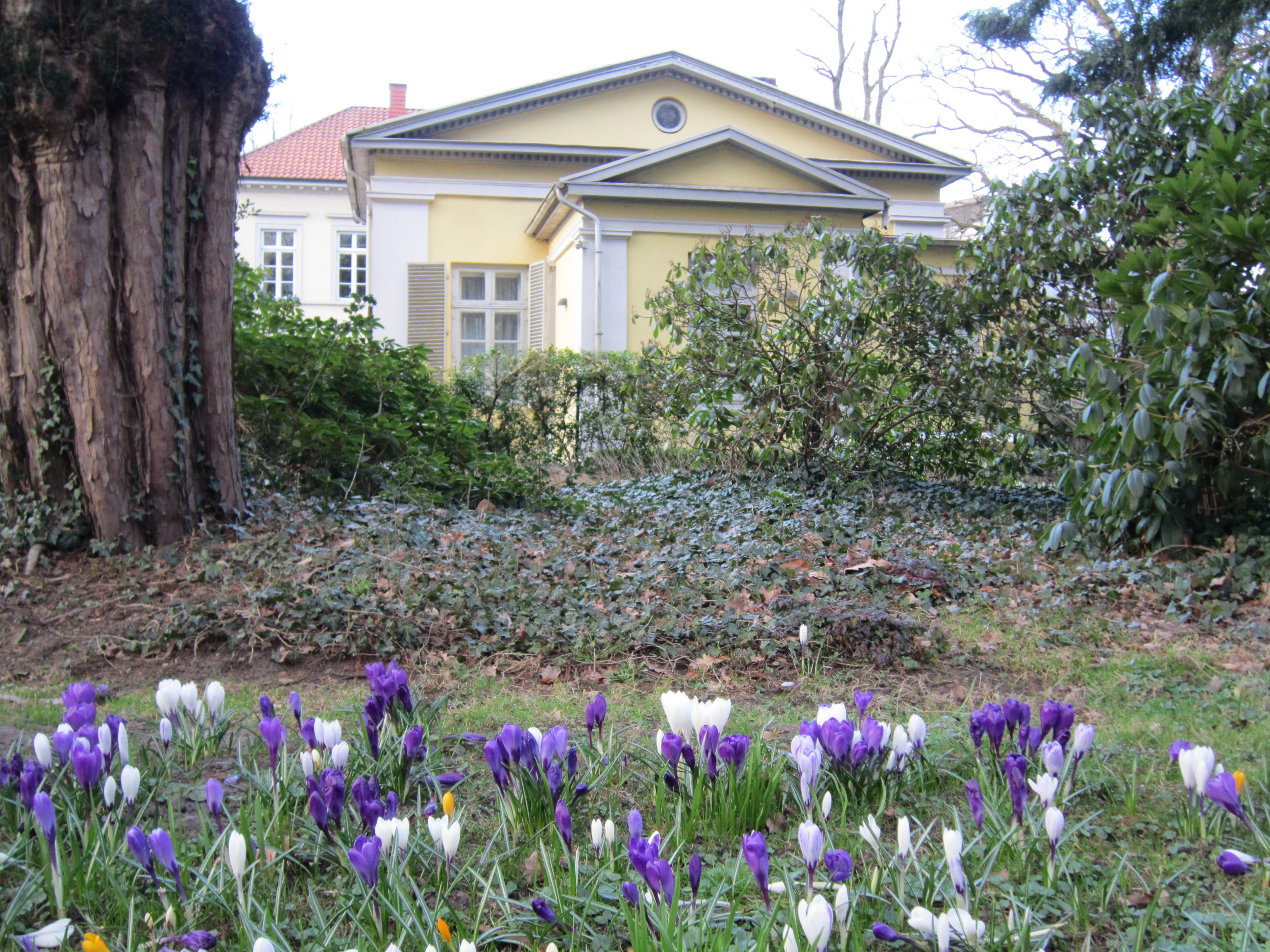
Gatehouse onto Gartenstraße with crocuses in the foreground.

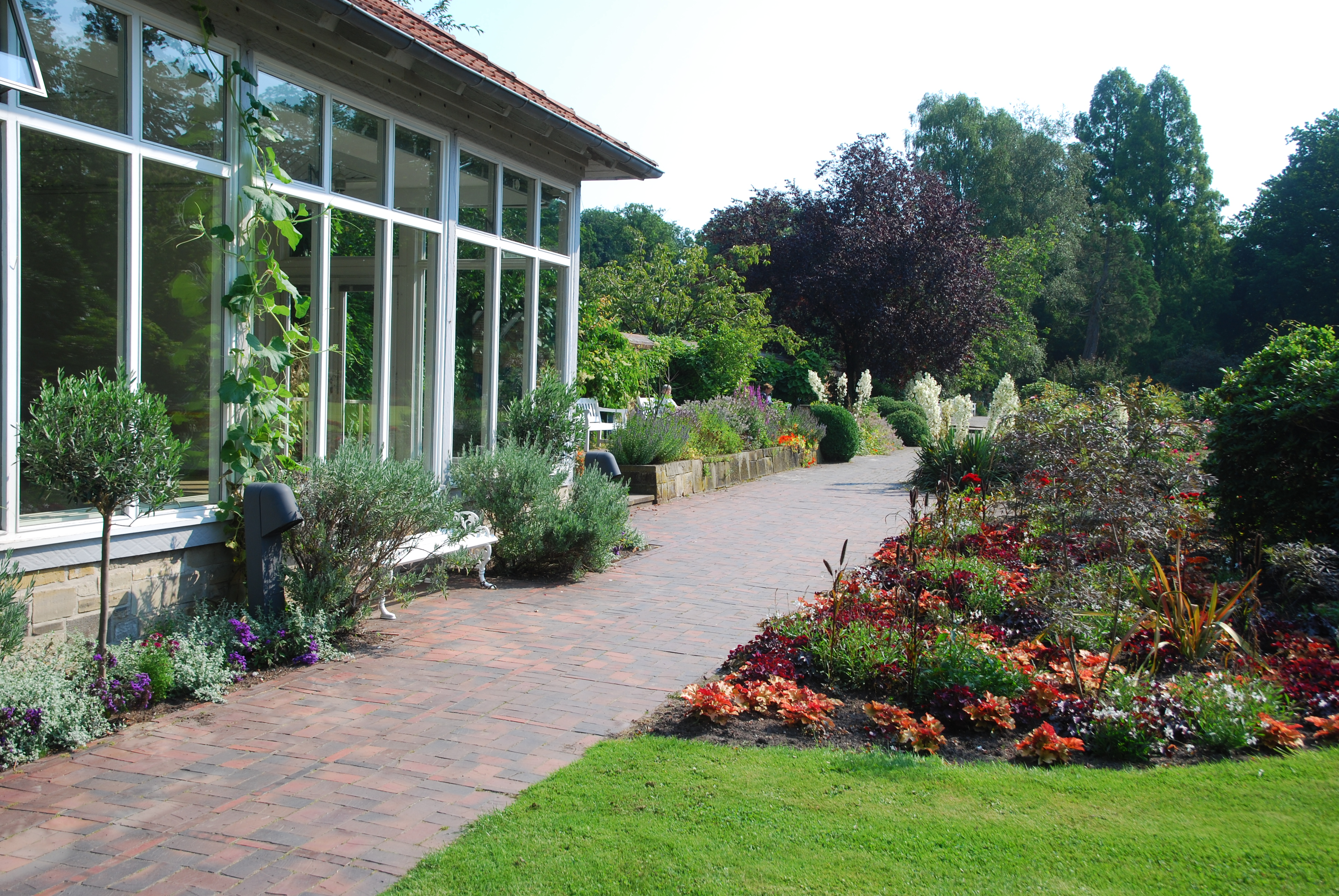
Glasshouse.

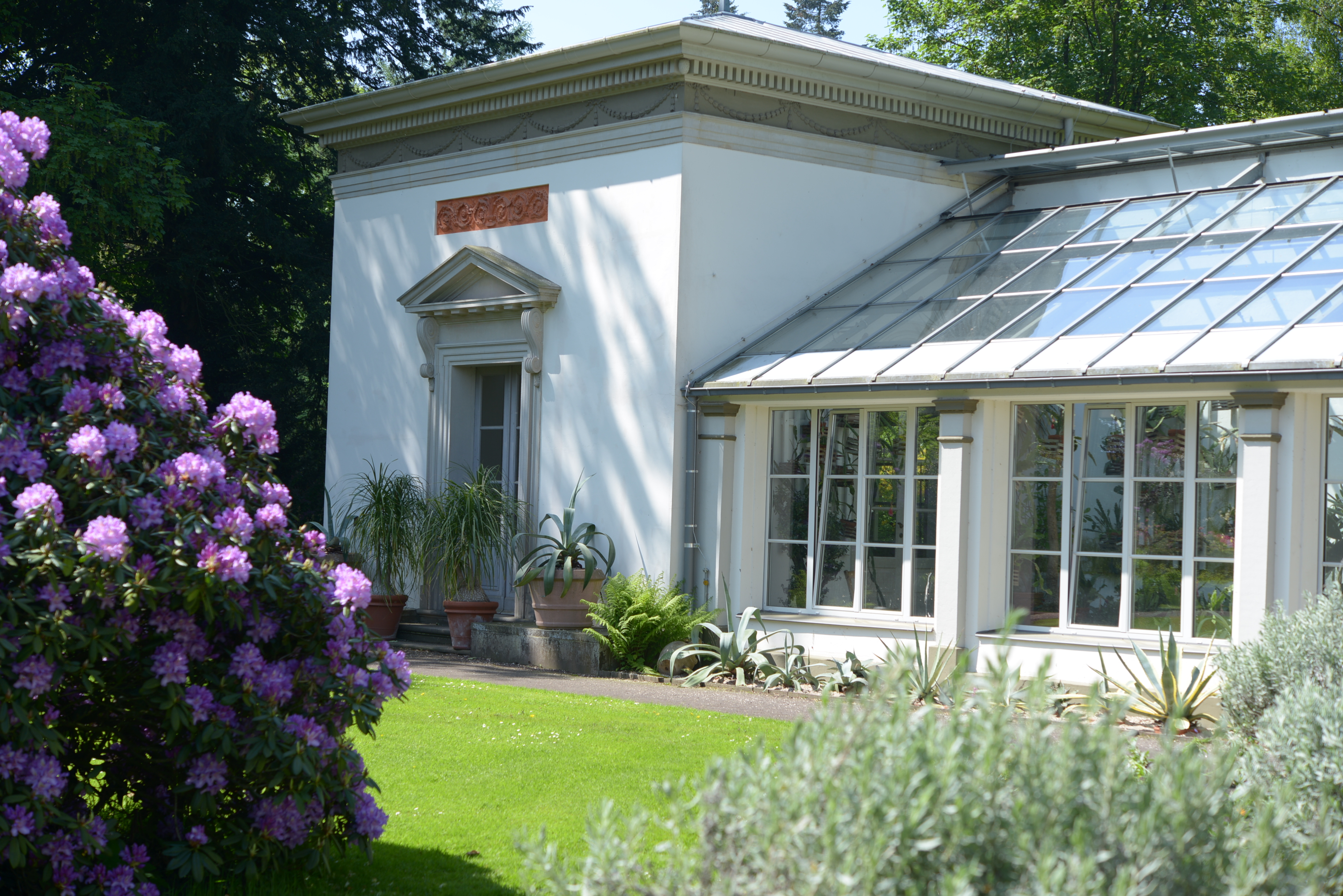
Cactus house.

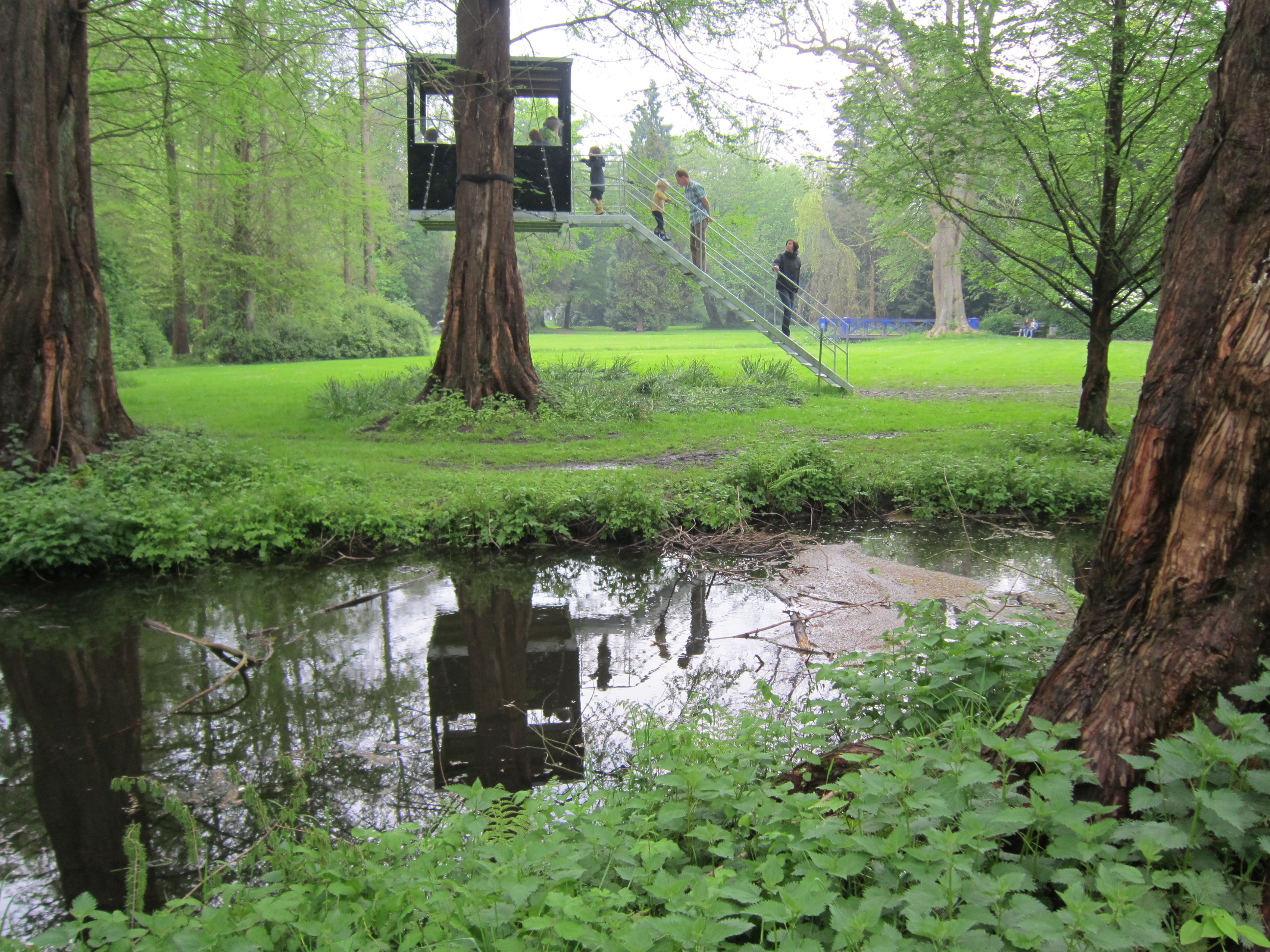
200th anniversary treehouse.

The Schlossgarten Oldenburg ("castle garden") is a 16-hectare public park in the city of Oldenburg, Lower Saxony, northern Germany, located between the Eversten district and the city centre to the north. At the northwest end is a lake and Elisabeth-Anna-Palais (built 1894–1896) and close to the northwest end is the Schloss Oldenburg.

== History ==
The garden is a historic park in the style of an English landscape garden. It was created on behalf of the Duke Peter Friedrich Ludwig of Oldenburg by the former court gardener Friedrich Wilhelm Julius Bosse.

In 1803 and 1805, the Duke acquired meadowland near the Schloss Oldenburg to create a garden and began work on this in 1809 with detailed plans. The Duke himself worked on design drawings. The first gardens were largely destroyed during the Napoleonic occupation. In 1814, Duke Julius Friedrich Wilhelm commissioned reconstruction and the further investment to establish the garden. The Duke worked on the garden for 42 years and the appearance that has changed little to the present day.

Duke Peter Friedrich Ludwig combined his personal use of the garden with an effort to allow his subjects enjoyment of the garden too. From the beginning, large parts of the gardens were open to the public. The only condition for admission were appropriate clothing and civilized behaviour. This lasted until the 1950s when it was still the custom to enter the gardens in Sunday clothes. In the same decade, the former garden director, Max Heber, considered the needs of the general population of Oldenburg. Thus the garden became more available for general use. The garden suffered little war damage and was used as a kitchen garden for fruit and vegetables for a period. Some of the trees were felled due to fuel shortages.

From 1920, the garden became public property and was until 1946 owned by the Free State of Oldenburg. Since then it became the property of the State of Lower Saxony. In 1952, a society was founded with the aim of preserving the garden. Since 1978, it has had official protected status. After an agreement in 2007, the Germany state contributes two thirds of the costs and the city of Oldenburg a third.

The garden manager resides in the "Hofgärtnerhaus" of the gardens.

In 1914, the 100th anniversary of the castle garden was celebrated with an exhibition and the planting of oak trees by the ducal family from April to September. 2014 saw events and exhibitions marking the 200th anniversary.

== Description ==
The garden has planting with water features, curved paths, and natural transitions within its landscape. routeing and seamless transition into the surrounding landscape. The Duke was in 1828 the plant today, typical of the rhododendrons. The rhododendrons in the garden are among the oldest in Germany. Many large mature trees from the early 19th century and still in the garden. Historic buildings include the Hofgärtnerhaus, and tea house or Winter House. After dusk, bats are active in the garden.

Unusually for a landscape garden in the English style, there is a lack of temples, ruins or chinoiserie. Perhaps this difference can be explained by the fact that the ideas of the landscape garden designer Humphry Repton were followed, and he refrained from including such follies.

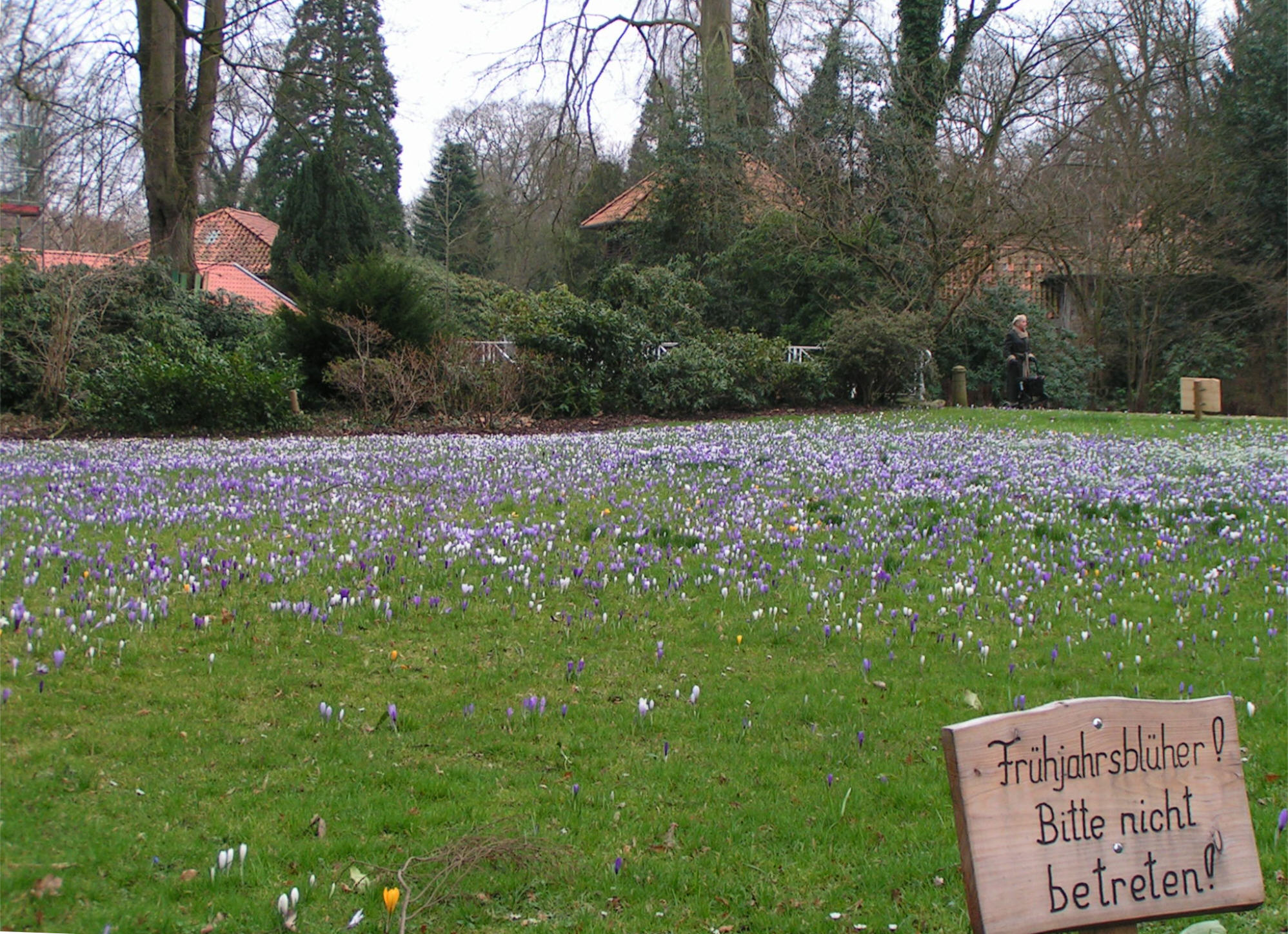
The Schlossgarten in February.

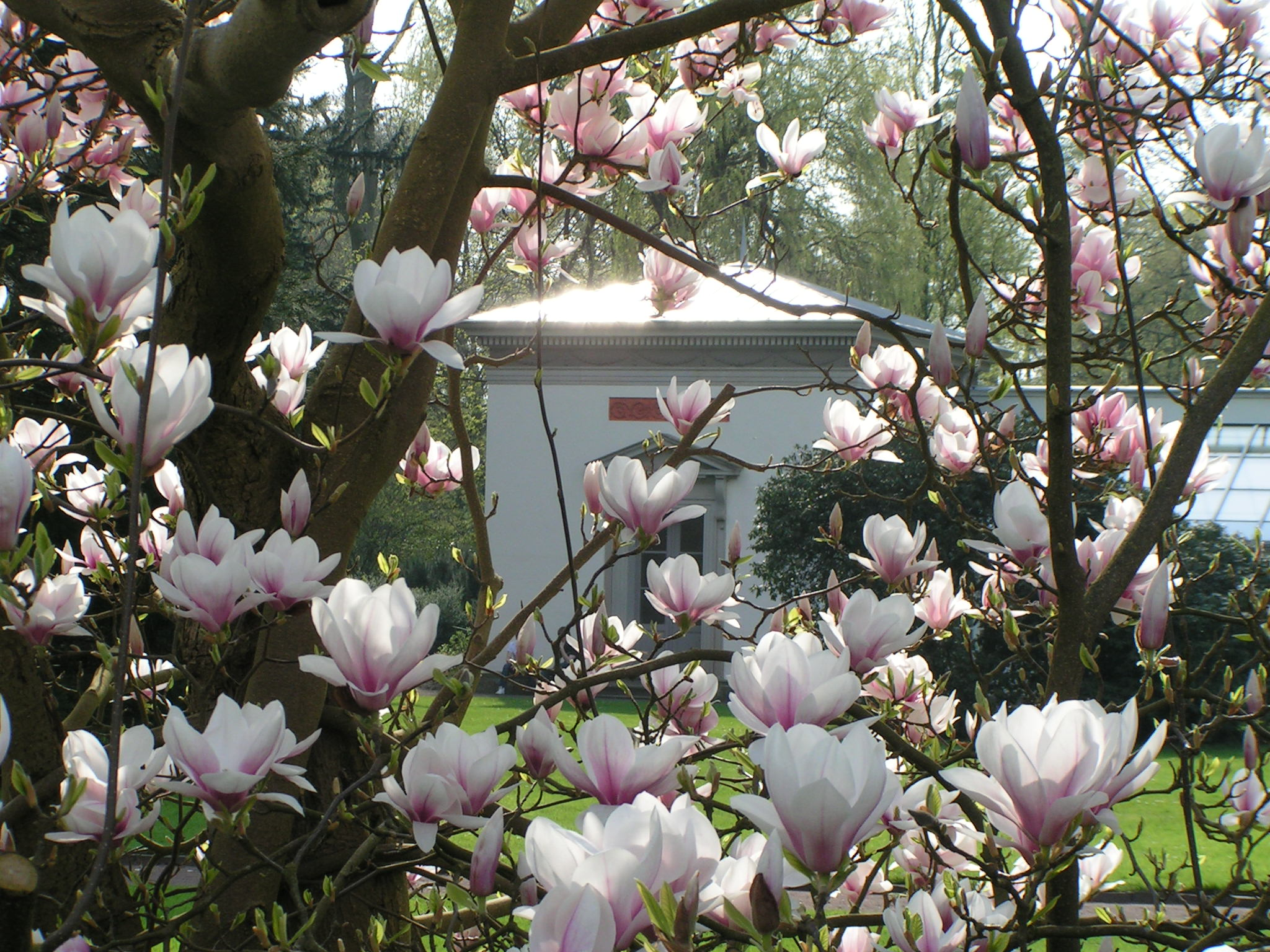
The Schlossgarten at the start of April.

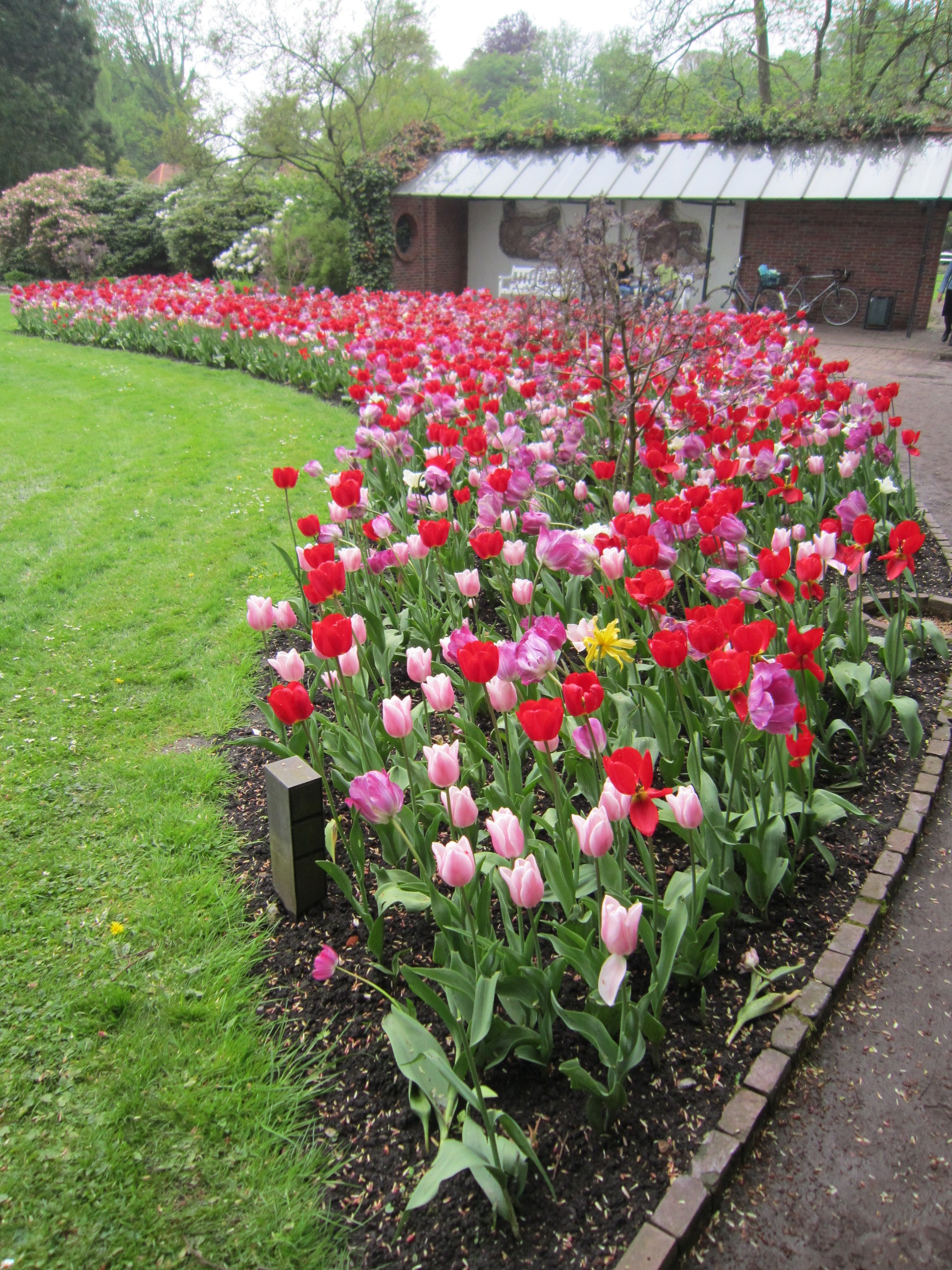
The Schlossgarten at the end of April.

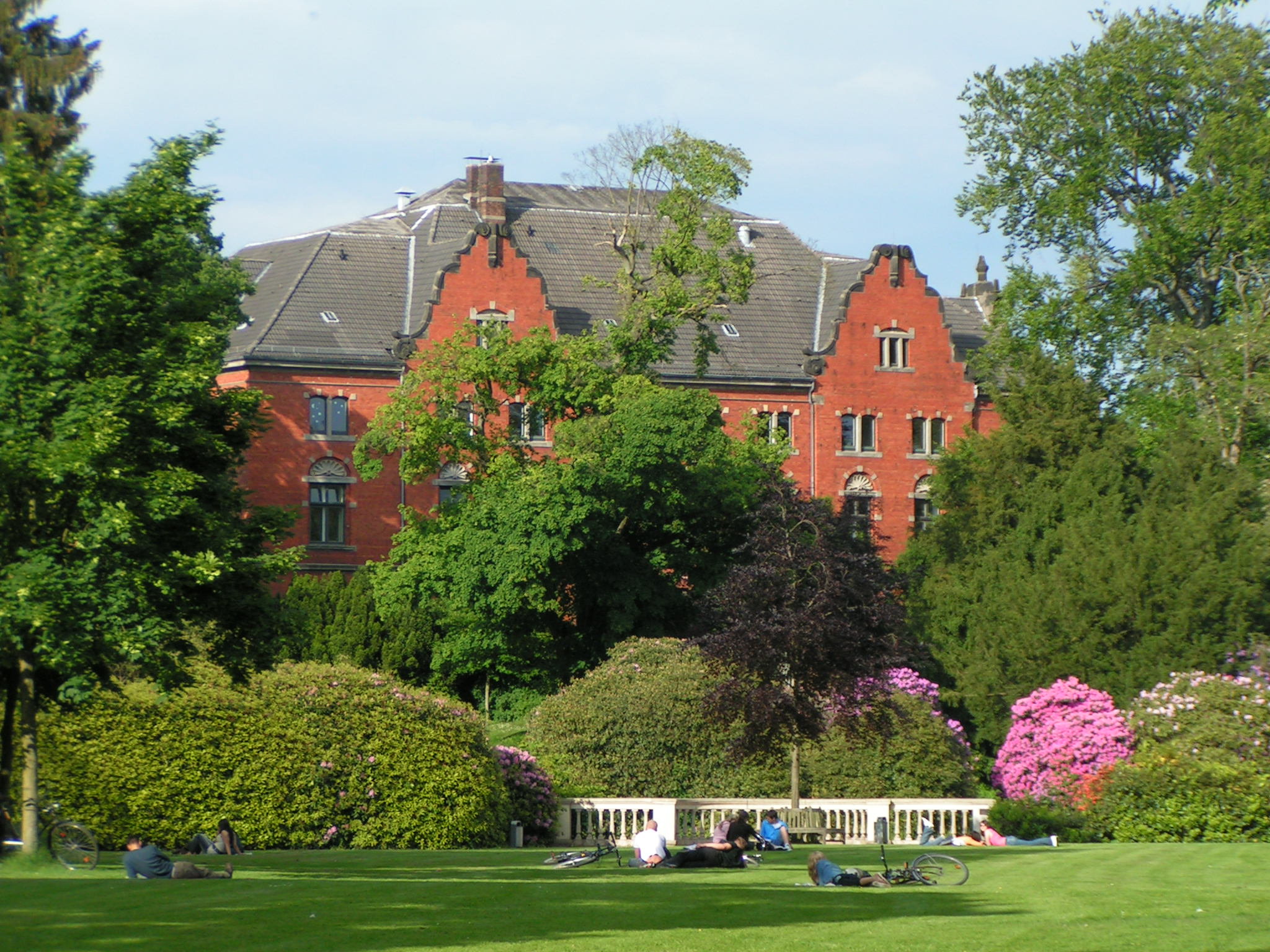
The Schlossgarten in June.

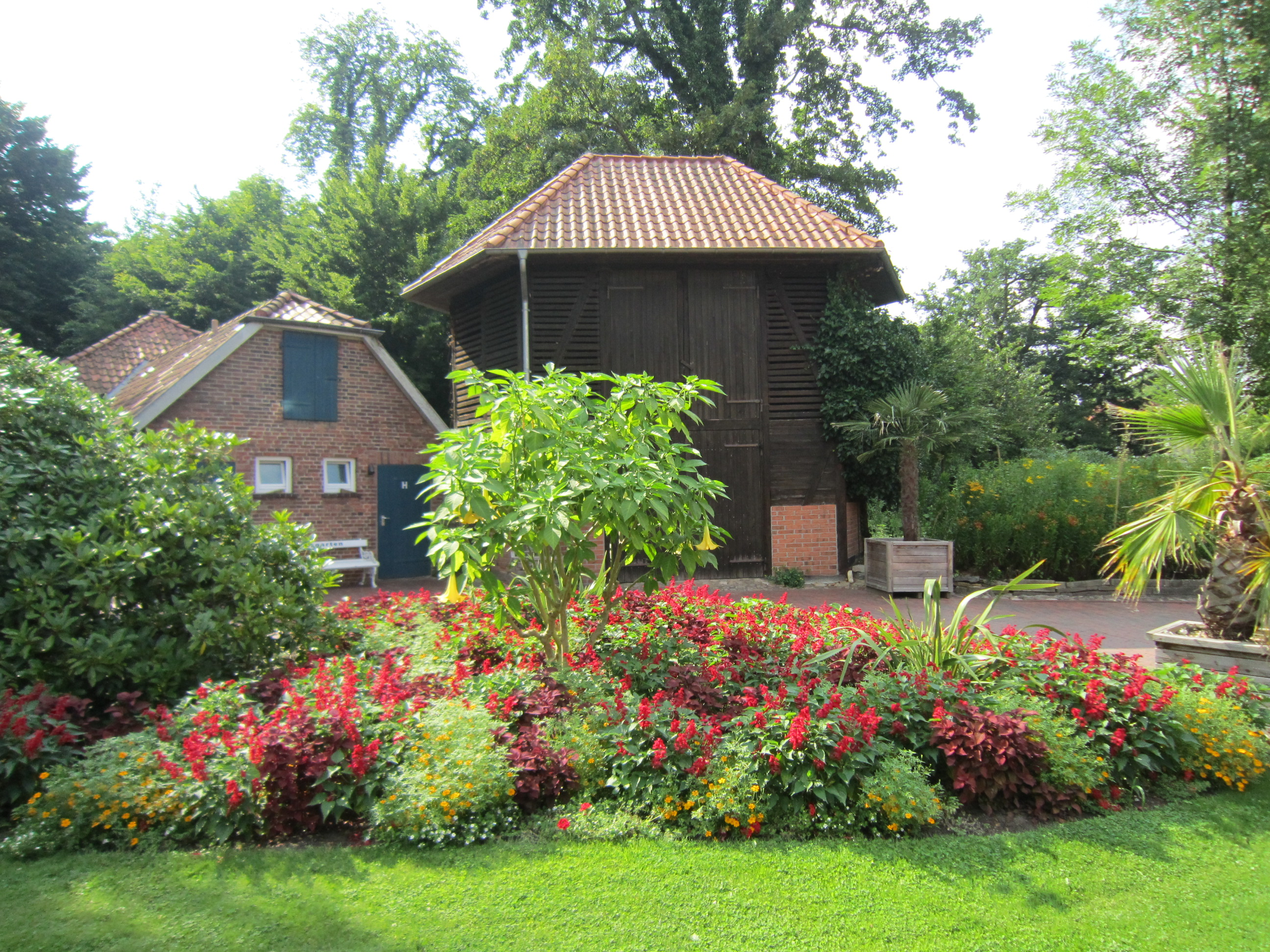
The Schlossgarten in July.

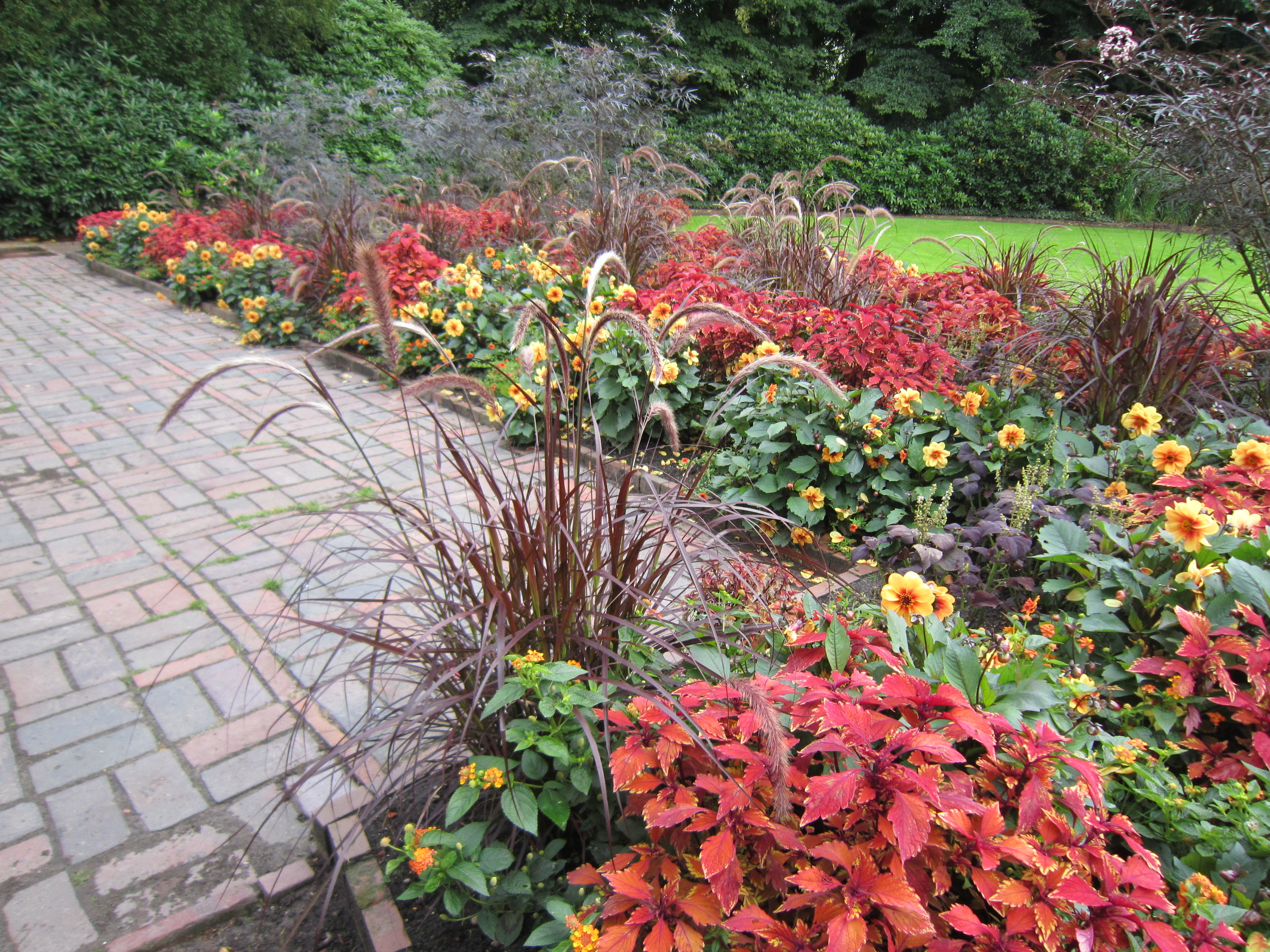
The Schlossgarten in August.

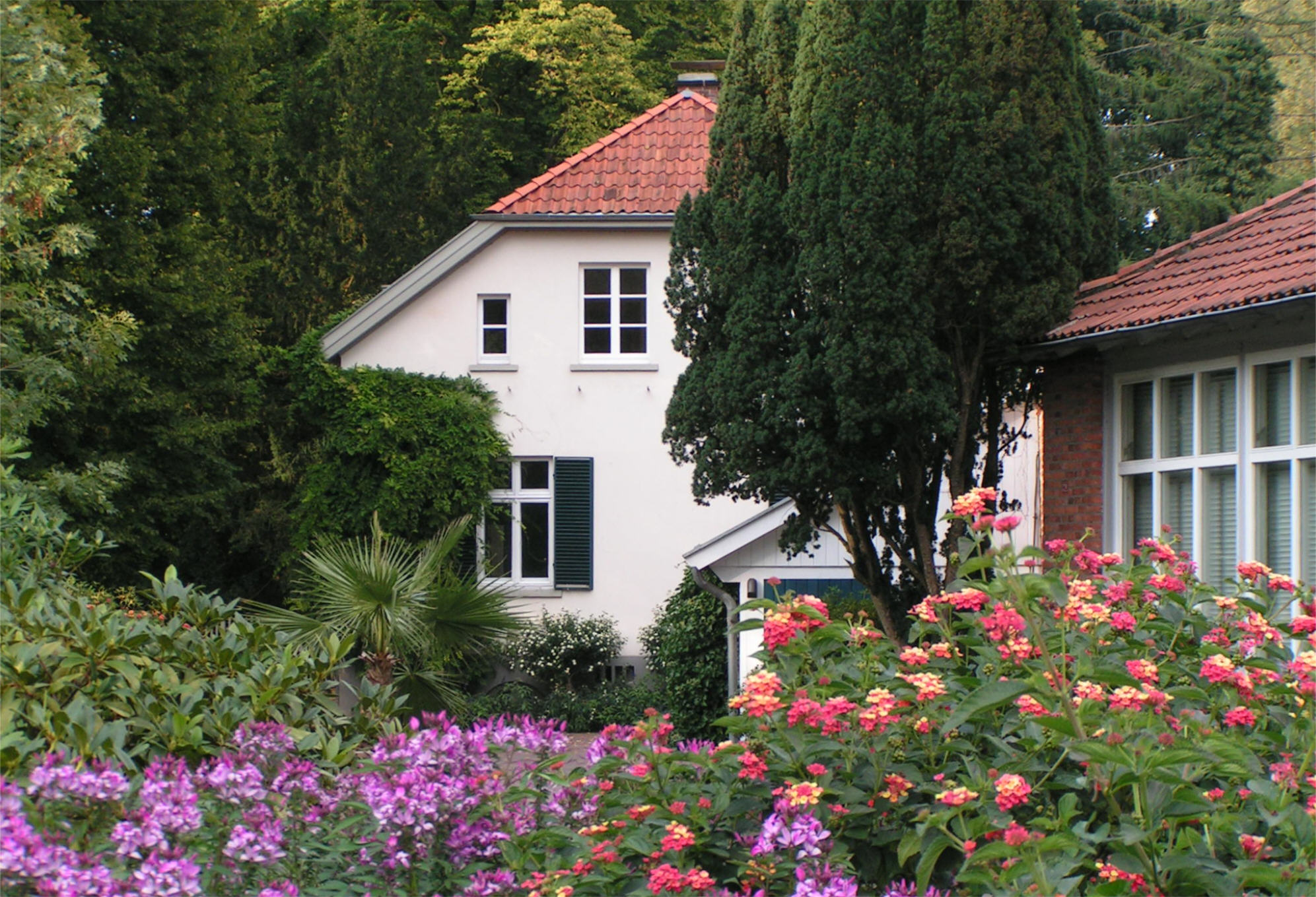
The Schlossgarten in September.

== Tourism ==
"Oldenburg Tourist" praises the palace gardens. The Schlossgarten Oldenburg forms the centerpiece of the "Route of garden culture", a network of over one hundred gardens in northwestern Germany. From April 2014 there was a series of events to mark the 200th anniversary of the garden.

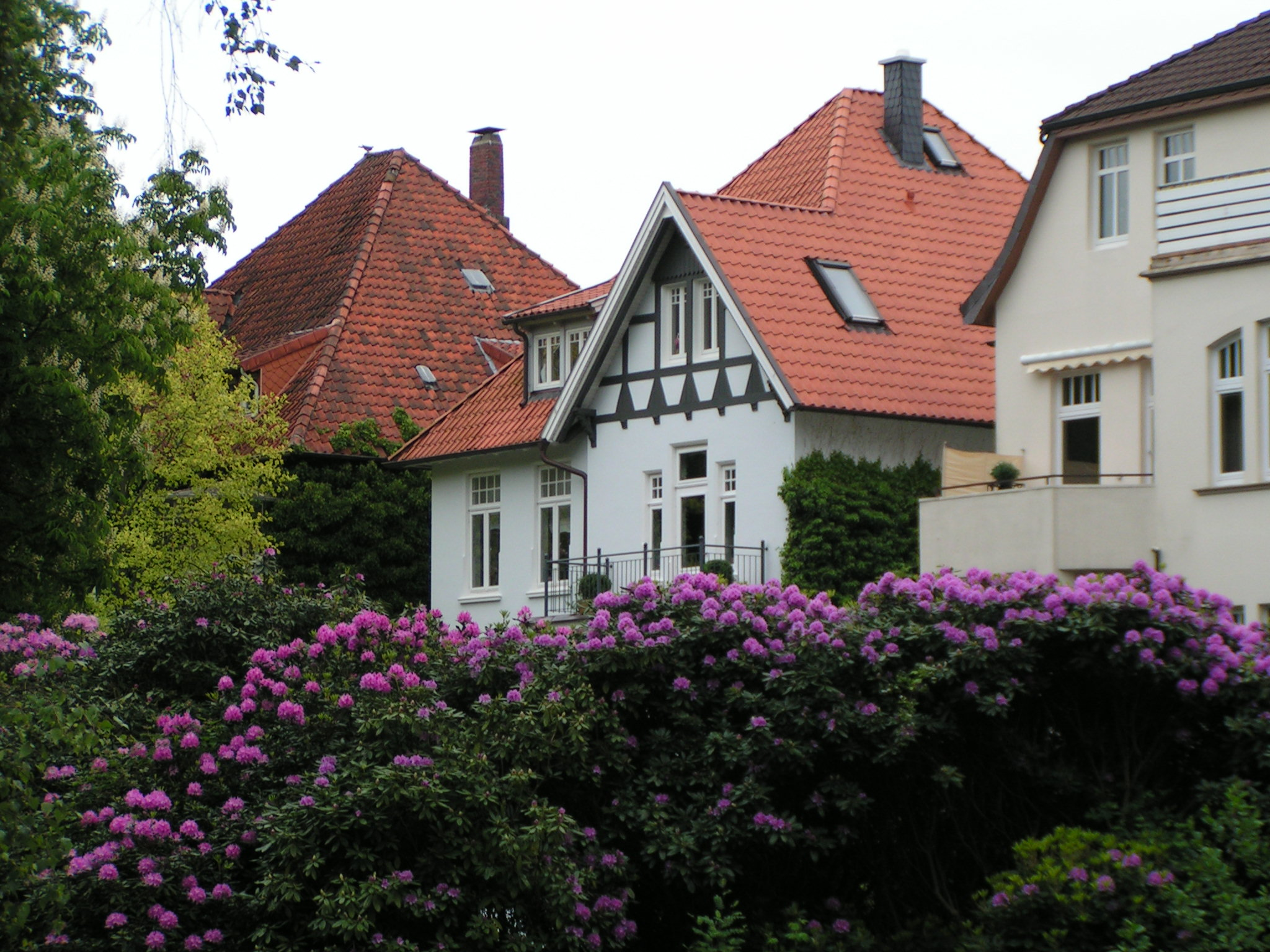
Rhododendrons in the garden.

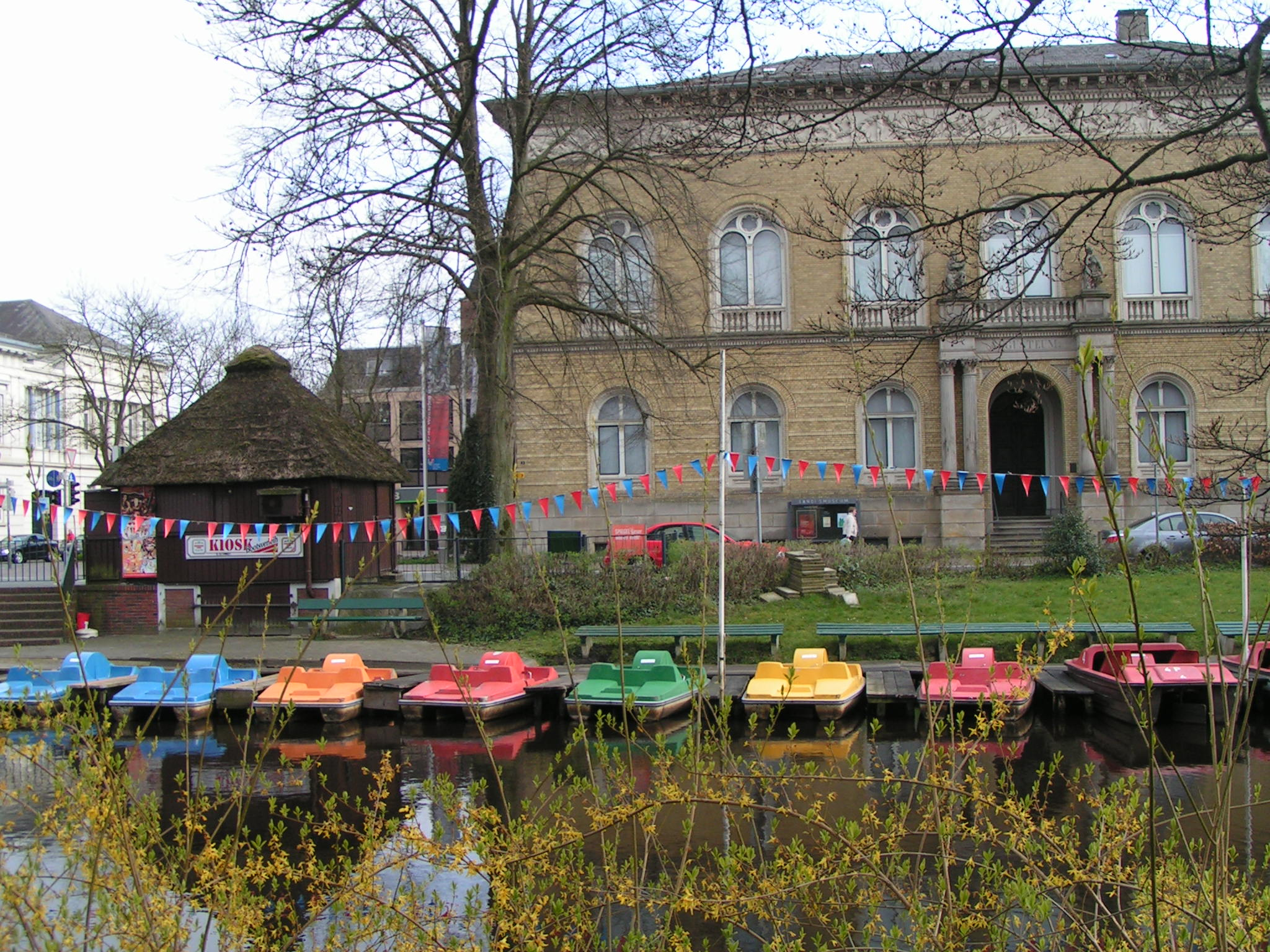
The northeast edge of the garden with pedalos and the Augusteum art gallery behind.

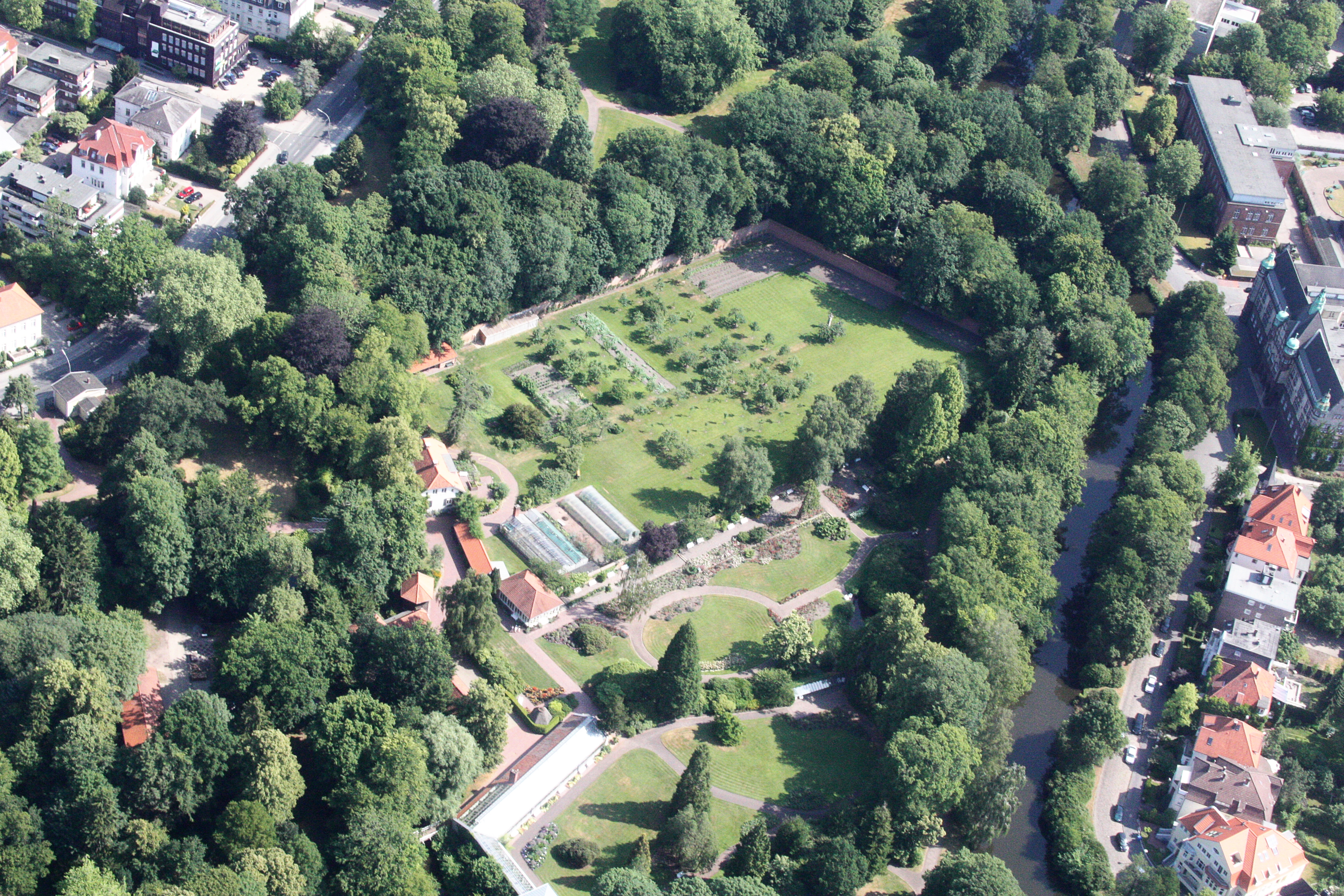
Aerial view.

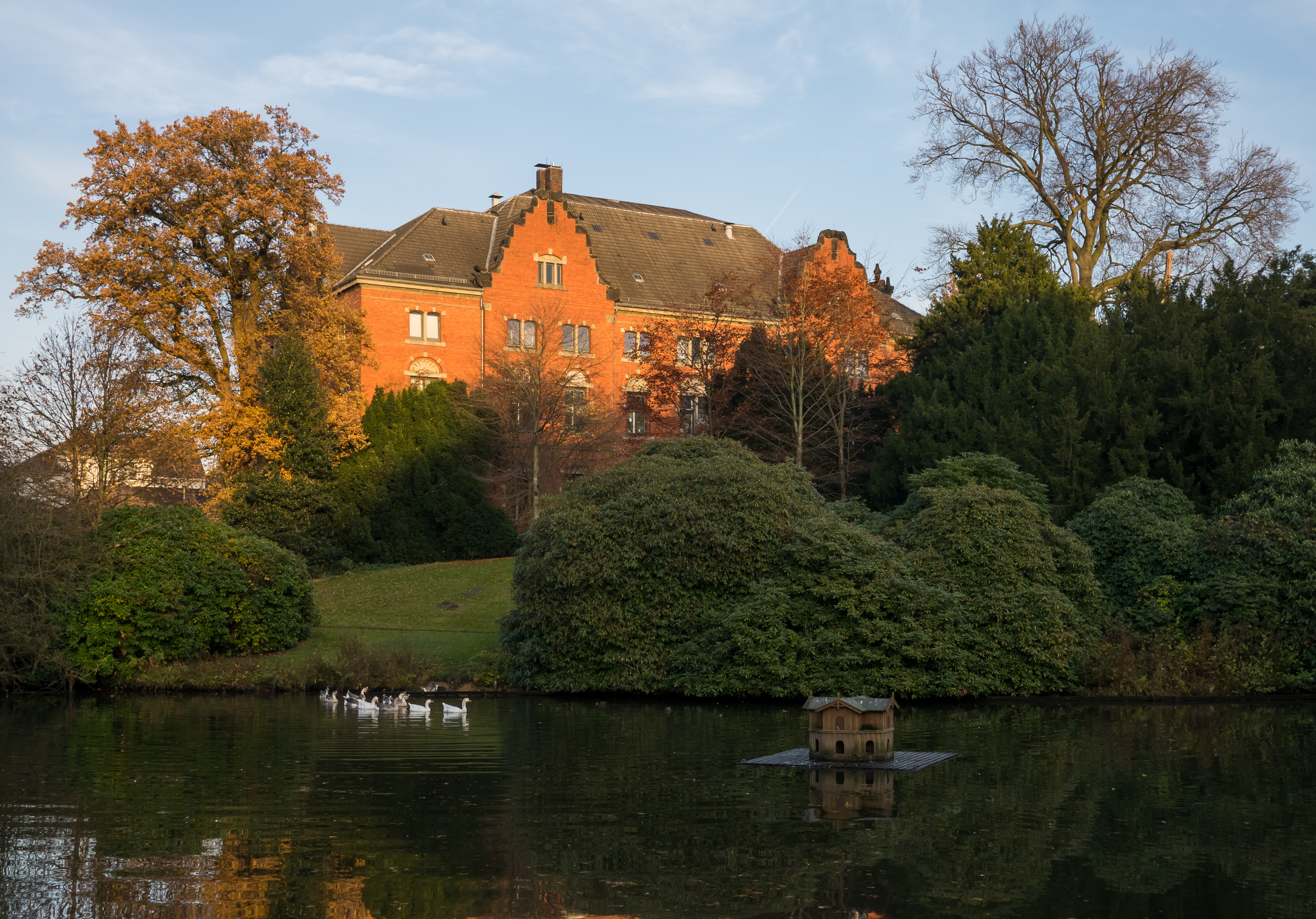
The Elisabeth-Anna-Palais in the garden.
