= Templin =

- Town
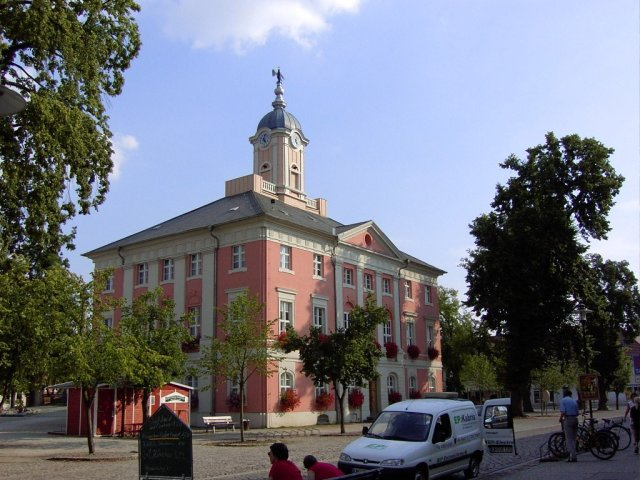
- Town hall

- Coat of arms

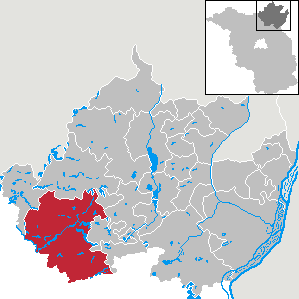
- Location of Templin within Uckermark district
- Interactive map of Templin
- Location within Germany Location within Brandenburg
- Coordinates: 53°07′N 13°30′E
- Country: Germany
- State: Brandenburg
- District: Uckermark
- Subdivisions: 24 Ortsteile

Government
  - Mayor (2018–26): Detlef Tabbert (Left)

Area
  - Total: 379.57 km^{2} (146.55 sq mi)
- Elevation: 60 m (200 ft)

Population (2025-12-31)
  - Total: 15,532
  - Density: 40.920/km^{2} (105.98/sq mi)
- Time zone: UTC+01:00 (CET)
  - Summer (DST): UTC+02:00 (CEST)
- Postal codes: 17268
- Dialling codes: 03987, 039882, 039883
- Vehicle registration: UM
- Website: www.templin.de

Templin (German: [tɛmˈpliːn]) is a small town in the Uckermark district of Brandenburg, Germany. Though it has a population of only 17,127 (2006), in terms of area it is, with 377.01 km2 (145.56 sq mi), the second largest town in Brandenburg (after Wittstock) and the seventh largest town in Germany. The town is located in the south of the rural Uckermark region and its capital Prenzlau, north of the Schorfheide-Chorin Biosphere Reserve. The municipality comprises the villages of Ahrensdorf, Bebersee, Beutel, Densow, Gandenitz, Gollin, Gross Dölln, Gross Väter, Grunewald, Hammelspring, Herzfelde, Hindenburg, Klosterwalde, Petznick, Röddelin, Storkow and Vietmannsdorf.

== History ==
The town was first mentioned in a 1270 deed issued by Henry of Ostheeren, Bishop of Brandenburg. Then a possession of the Ascanian margraves of Brandenburg, it appeared as a town in 1314 under Margrave Waldemar, who in 1317 concluded the Treaty of Templin here, ending the war against Denmark, Mecklenburg and the Duchy of Pomerania. Heavily devastated by Danish troops in the Thirty Years' War, Templin from 1816 on belonged to the Prussian province of Brandenburg near the border with Mecklenburg-Strelitz.

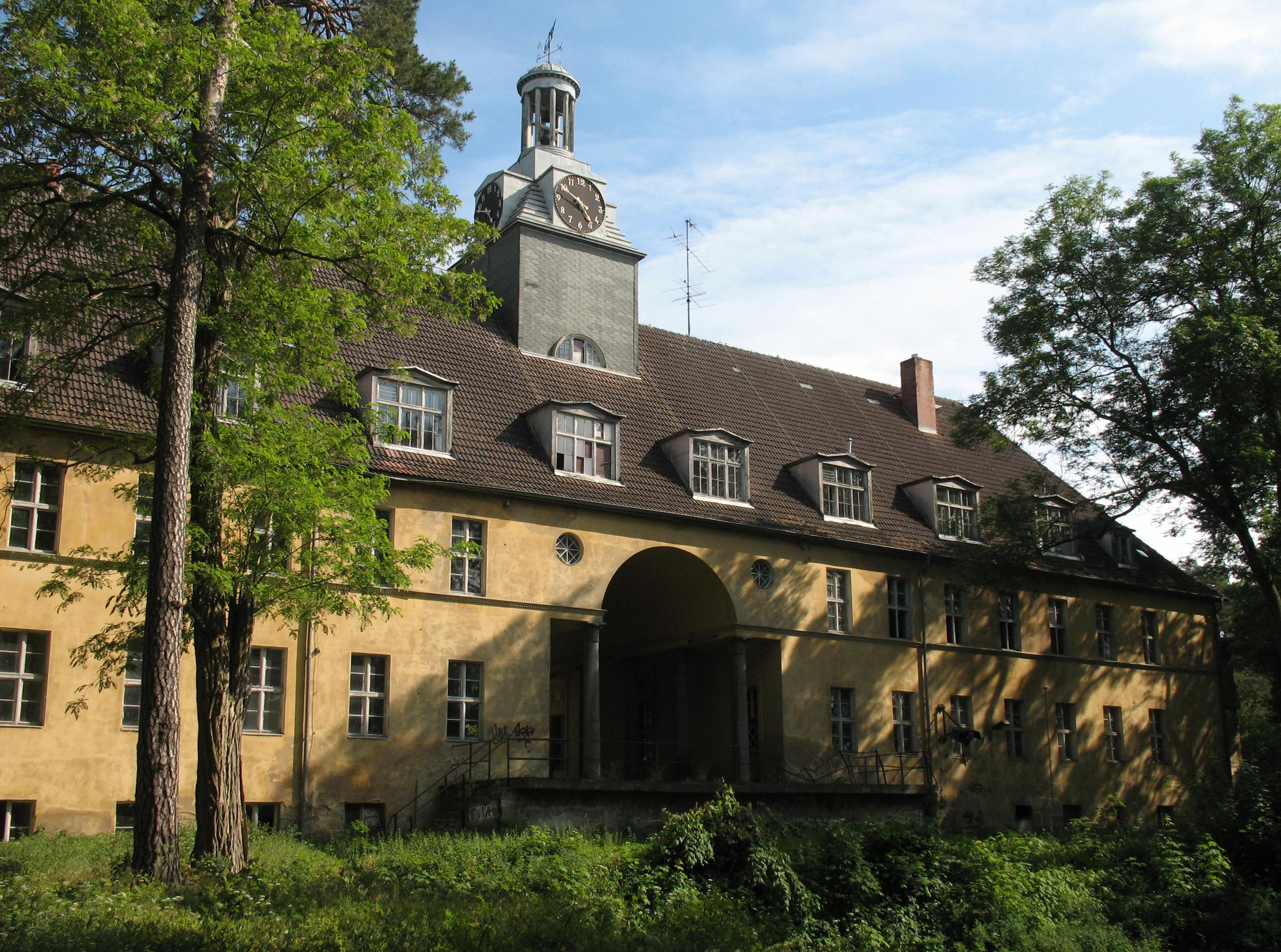
Former Electoral Brandenburgian boarding school (Joachimsthalsches Gymnasium)

From 1912 on, Templin was the seat of the Electoral Brandenburgian boarding school (Joachimsthalsches Gymnasium) established in 1601 by Elector Joachim III Frederick of Hohenzollern at nearby Joachimsthal. The school was finally dissolved in 1953. Today, Templin has a modern grammar school built in 1997.

== Mayors ==
- 1990 - 2010 Ulrich Schoeneich (SPD, later independent)
- 2010 - today Detlef Tabbert (The Left)

Detlef Tabbert was elected in 2010 with 63.4% of the vote, and re-elected in 2018.

== Politics ==
Seats in the town's assembly (Stadtverordnetenversammlung) as of 2026:

- Christian Democratic Union (CDU): 7
- Alternative for Germany (AfD): 7
- Uckermark Heath BvfG-WbV: 7
- Social Democratic Party & The Greens: 4
- The Left: 3

== Demography ==
Development of population since 1875 within the current Boundaries (blue line: population; dotted line: comparison to population development in Brandenburg state; grey background: time of Nazi Germany; red background: time of communist East Germany)

Recent population development and projections (population development before 2011 census (blue line); recent population development according to the Census in Germany in 2011 (blue bordered line); official projections for 2005-2030 (yellow line); for 2017-2030 (scarlet line); for 2020-2030 (green line)

Templin: Population development
within the current boundaries (2020)

| Year | Pop. | ±% p.a. |
|---|---|---|
| 1875 | 11,669 | — |
| 1890 | 12,065 | +0.22% |
| 1910 | 12,495 | +0.18% |
| 1925 | 14,525 | +1.01% |
| 1939 | 15,065 | +0.26% |
| 1950 | 19,516 | +2.38% |
| 1964 | 17,491 | −0.78% |

| Year | Pop. | ±% p.a. |
|---|---|---|
| 1971 | 17,473 | −0.01% |
| 1981 | 17,912 | +0.25% |
| 1985 | 18,664 | +1.03% |
| 1990 | 18,884 | +0.23% |
| 1995 | 18,227 | −0.71% |
| 2000 | 18,273 | +0.05% |
| 2005 | 17,347 | −1.03% |

| Year | Pop. | ±% p.a. |
|---|---|---|
| 2010 | 16,455 | −1.05% |
| 2015 | 16,067 | −0.48% |
| 2016 | 16,117 | +0.31% |
| 2017 | 15,974 | −0.89% |
| 2018 | 15,798 | −1.10% |
| 2019 | 15,728 | −0.44% |
| 2020 | 15,636 | −0.58% |

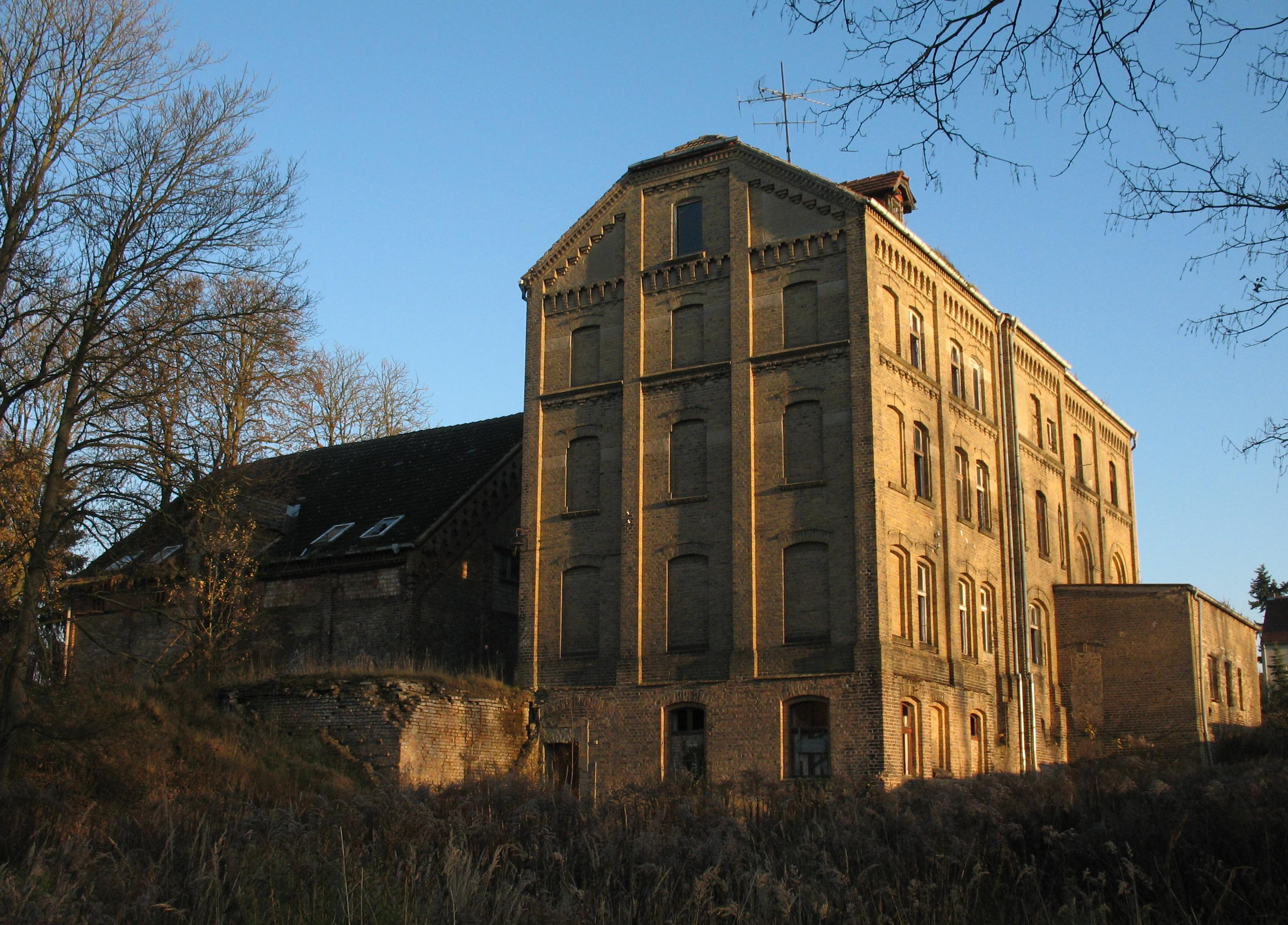
Former brewery

== Points of interest ==
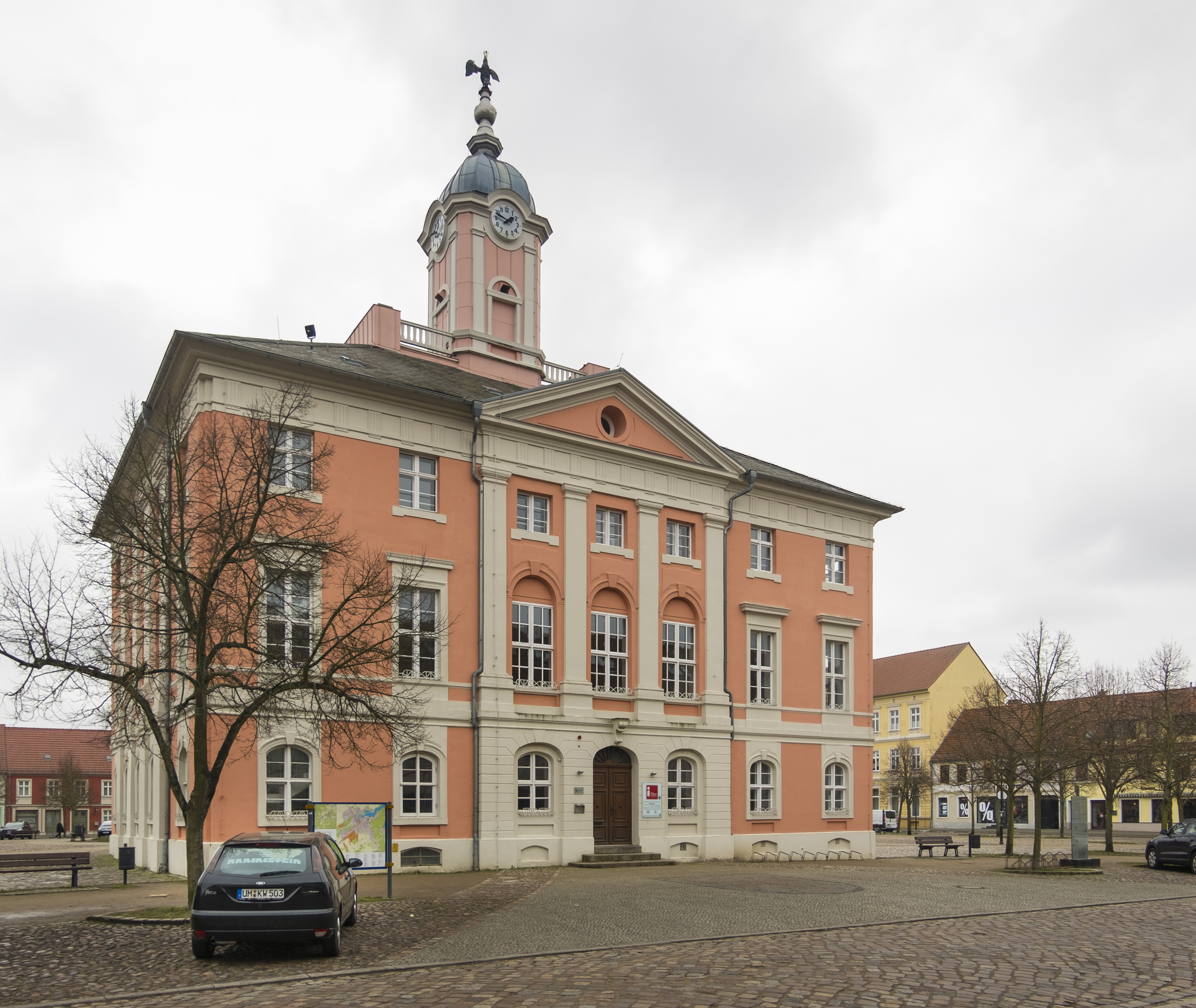
Historic City Hall

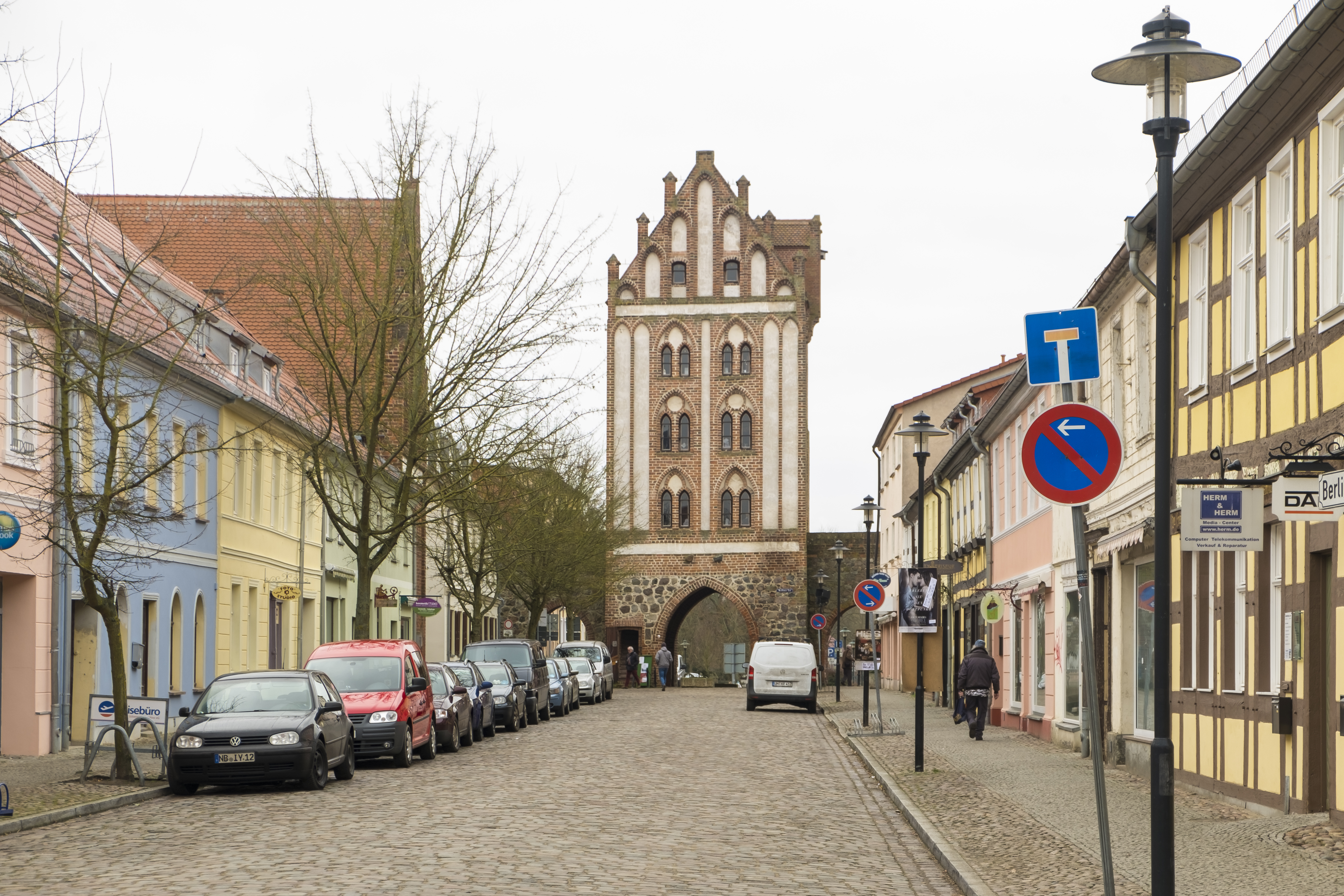
Gate tower-Berliner Tor

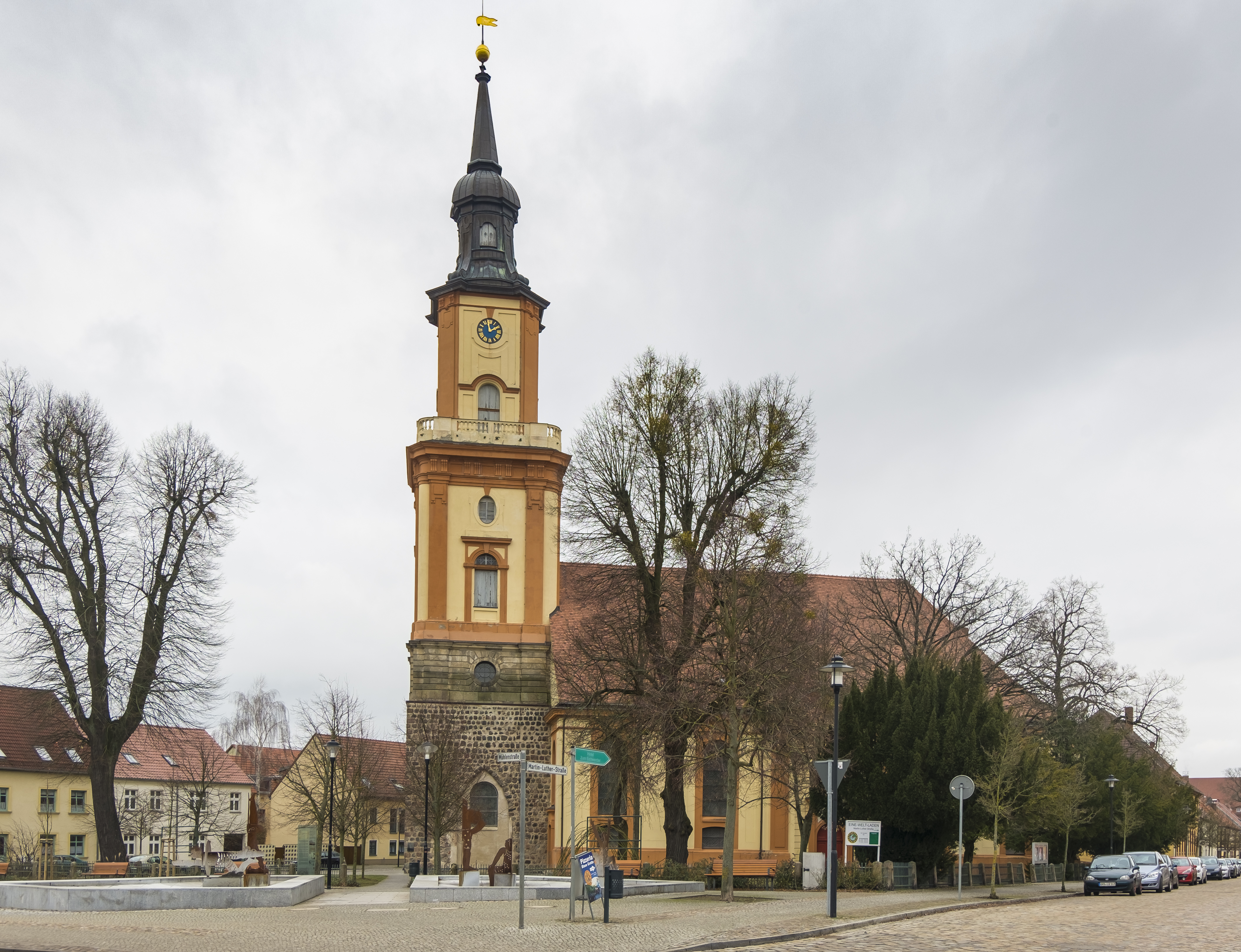
St.-Maria-Magdalena-Church

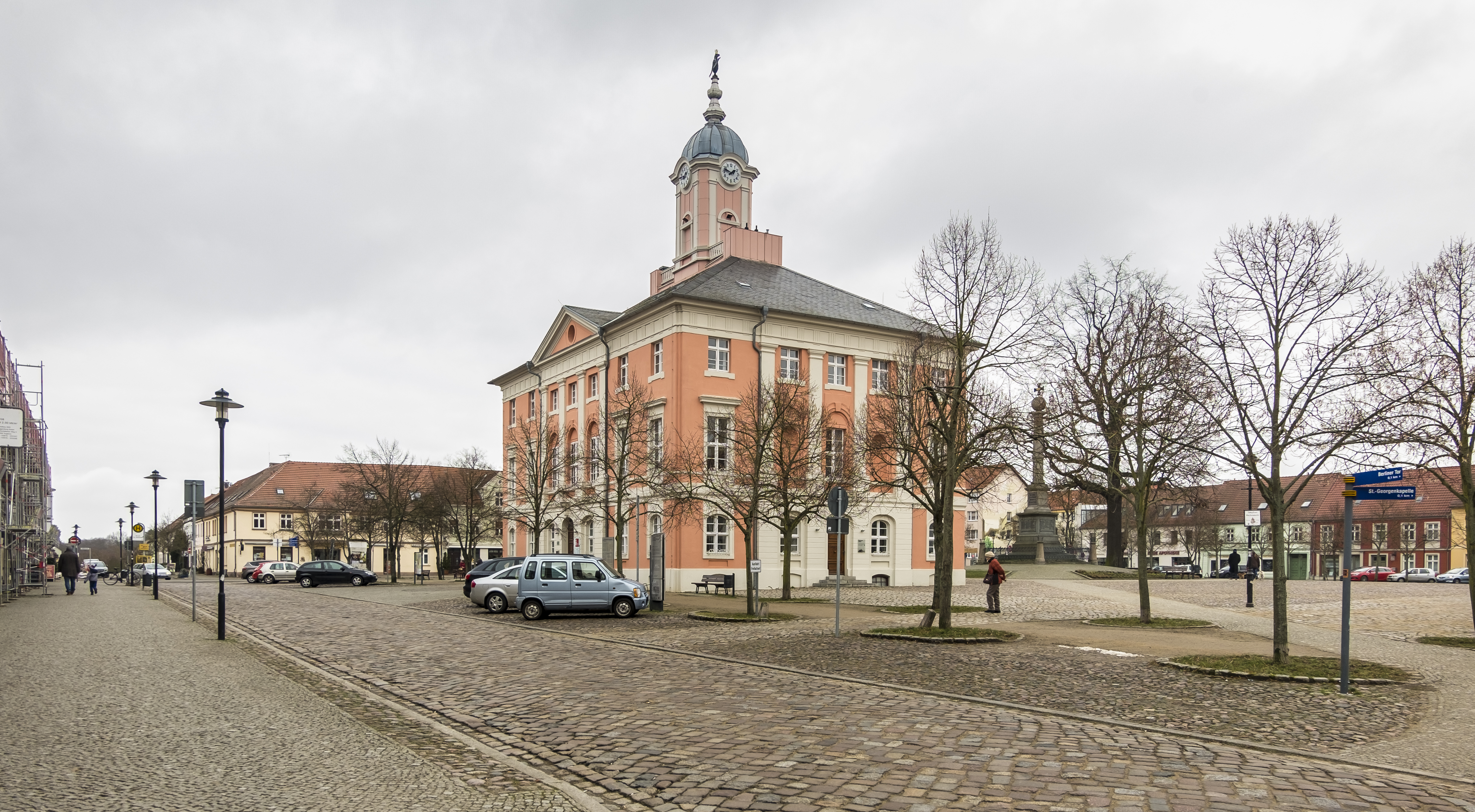
Marketplace

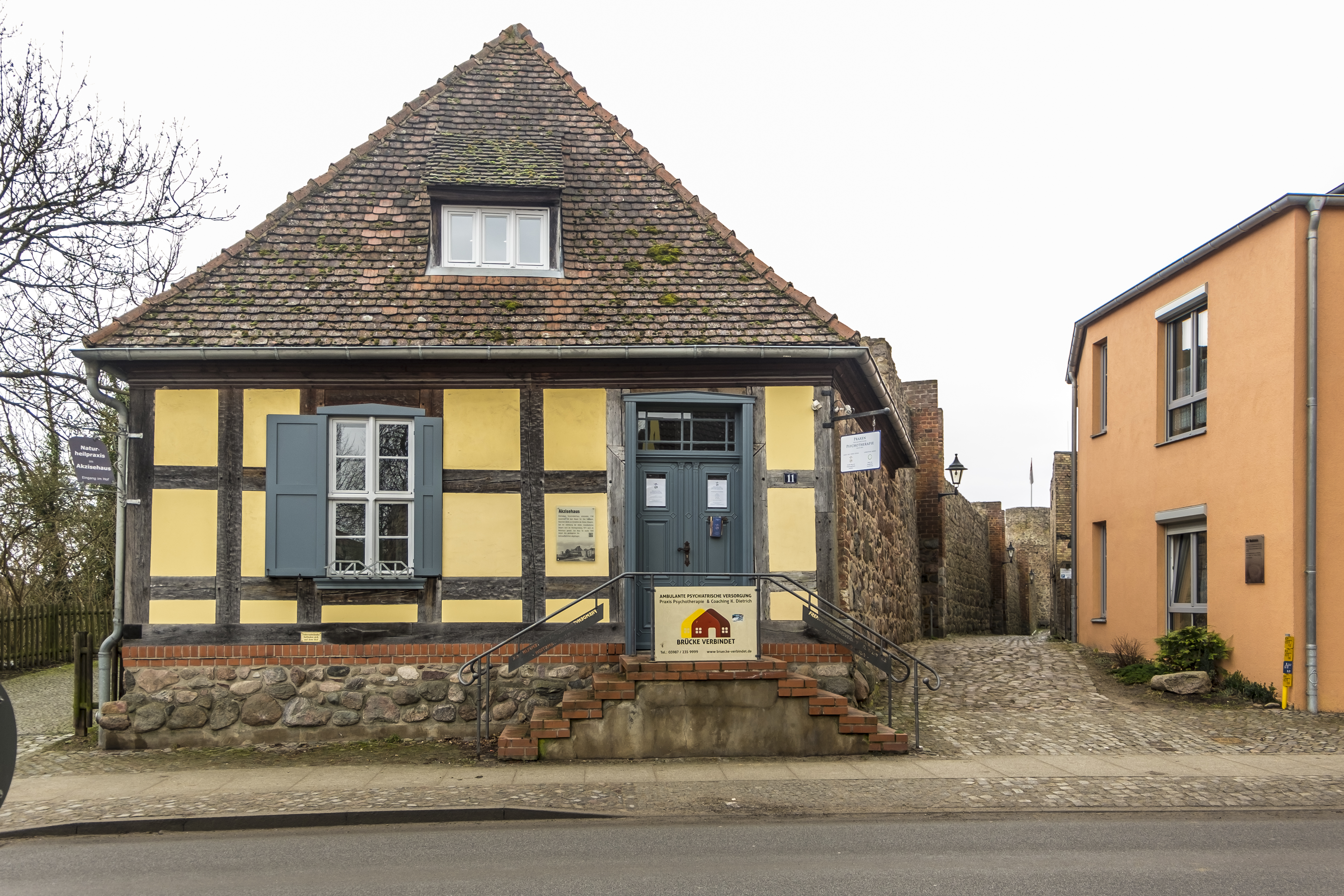
Akzisehaus

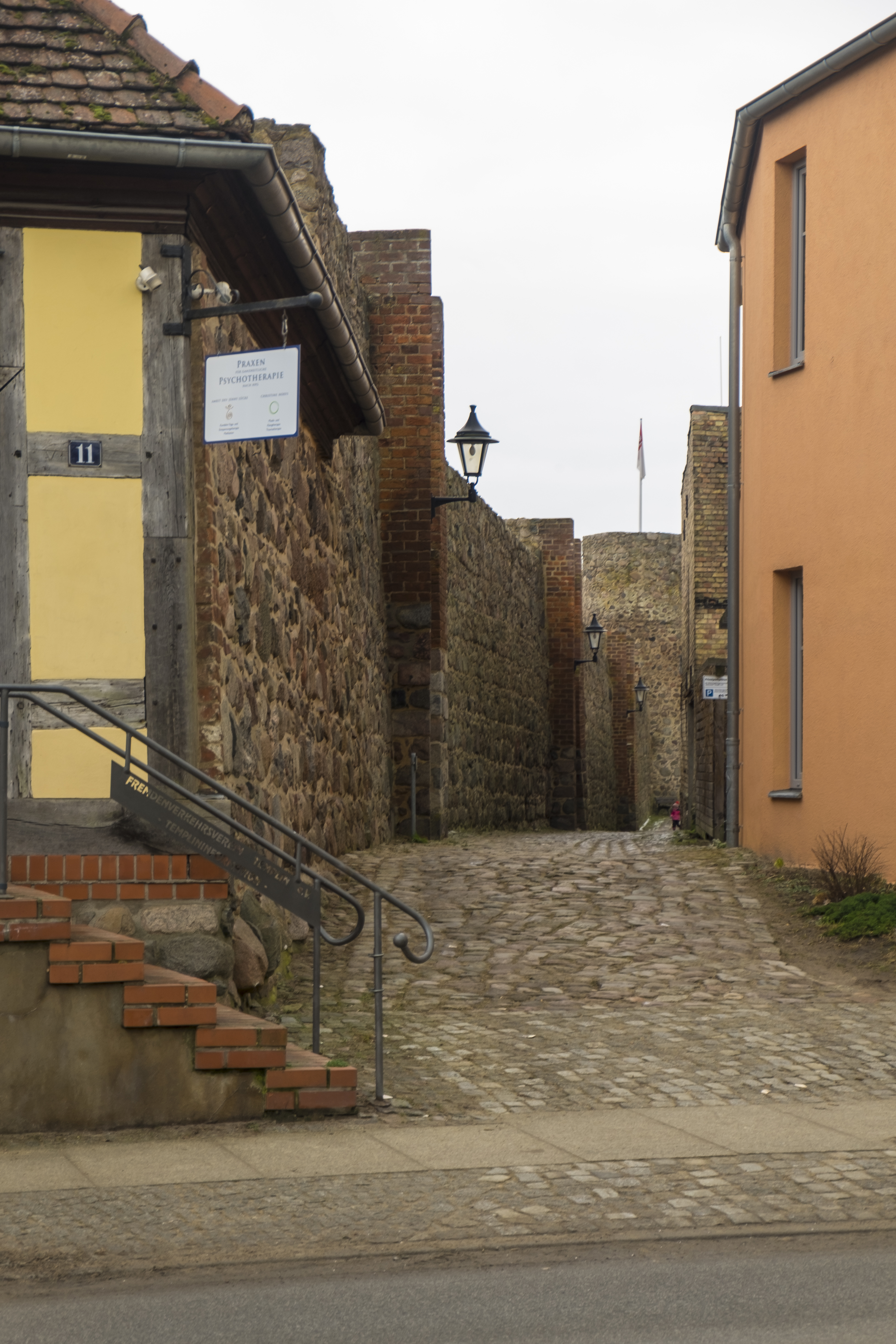
City Wall at the Akzisehaus

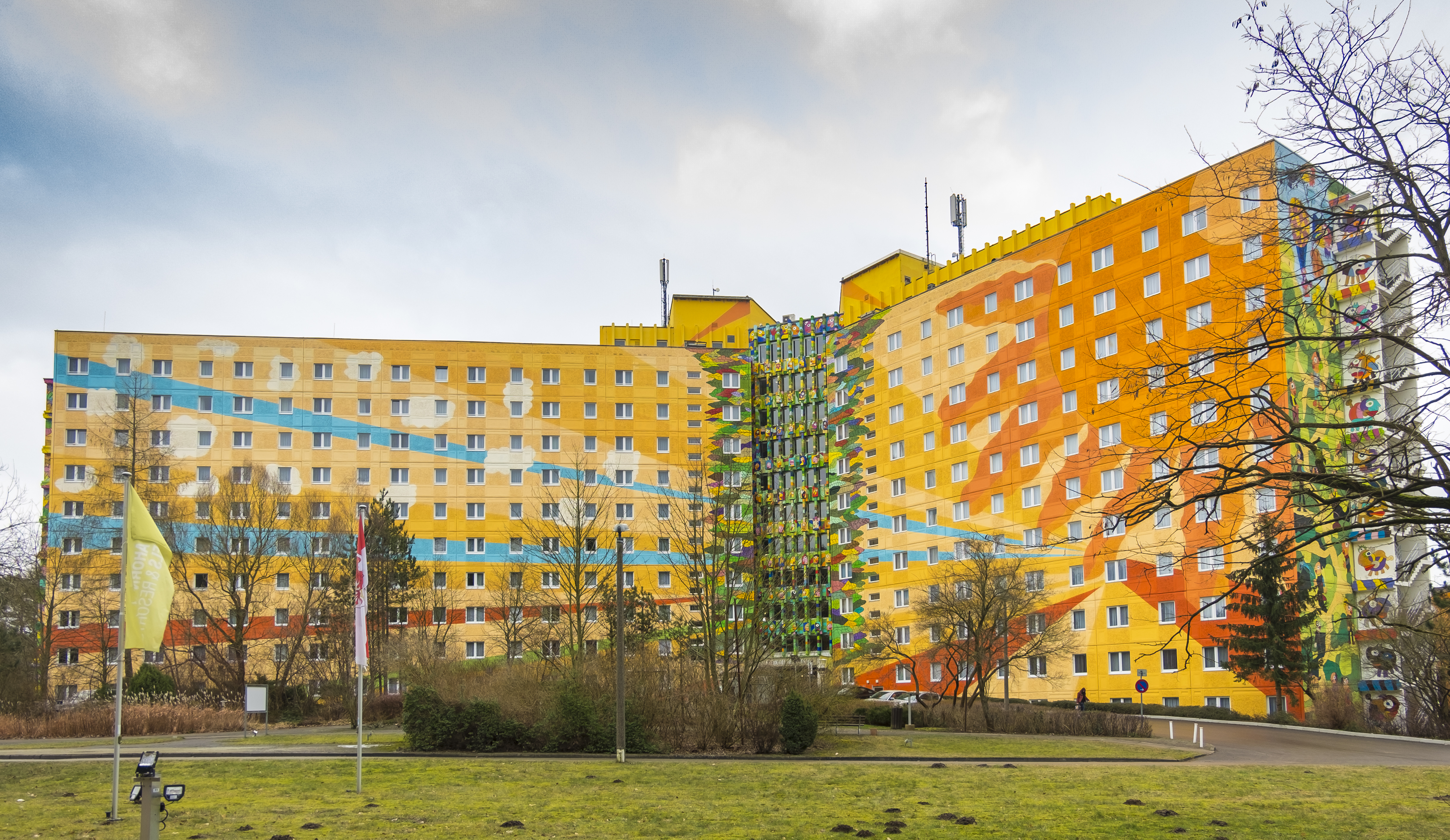
Seehotel Templin

Templin's city walls are small, but complete. There are 3 main gate towers and several modern entrances, where parts of the wall were torn down. The main Protestant church is the St.-Maria-Magdalenen-Kirche. The town has many eastern era Plattenbau houses (highrise apartments) and smaller neighborhoods.

The Lehmann-Garten, a botanical garden was recreated in 1988 in the park of the former Joachimsthalsches Gymnasium.

Hermann Göring from 1933 on had his country residence Carinhall erected in the forest south of Gollin. The building designed by Werner March was destroyed by Luftwaffe personnel in April 1945, just days before the Red Army reached the area.

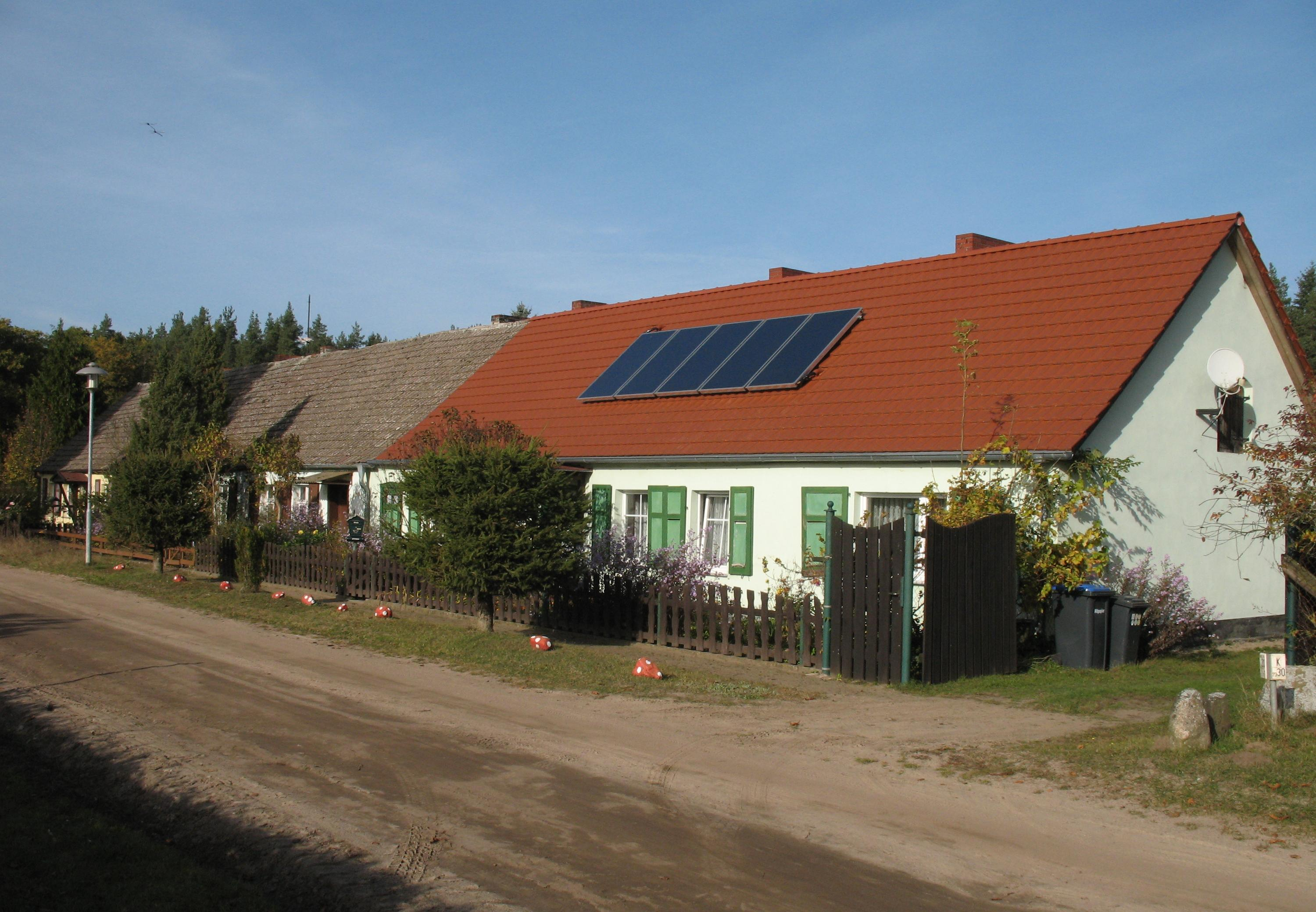
Alt Placht

North of Groß Dölln is an airfield built in the 1950s as a military airbase of the 16th Air Army of the Soviet Forces

Templin has recently built a spa and mainly relies on tourism. It is a popular destination for day-trippers from Berlin to enjoy the many glacial lakes and extended forests. There is no discothèque in Templin, the closest is in Milmersdorf. The town square with the old town hall building is surrounded by an active downtown. There are many shops and restaurants in the area and an outdoor market every week. Many neighbouring municipalities like Milmersdorf and several other villages rely on Templin for many services.

There is an old powder tower in the town wall known as the Pulverturm.

== Twin towns ==
- Bad Lippspringe, Germany
- Połczyn-Zdrój, Poland

== Notable people ==
- Friederike Krüger, (1789–1848), female Prussian soldier, died at Templin.
- Walter Ulbricht, politician (SED), (1893–1973), head of East German state 1960–1973, died at Groß Dölln.
- Herlind Kasner, (1928–2019), mother of Angela Merkel, born in Danzig (now Gdańsk, Poland), died at Templin.
- Angela Winkler, actress, born 1944 at Templin
- Manfred Kokot, (born 1948), Olympic athlete
- Angela Merkel, (born 1954), politician (CDU), German chancellor from 2005 to 2021 grew up from 1957 in Templin. Merkel was made an honorary citizen of Templin in 2019.
- Christa Wiese (born 1967), athlete

== See also ==
- Lübbesee
