= Lübbesee =

Lake in Brandenburg, Germany

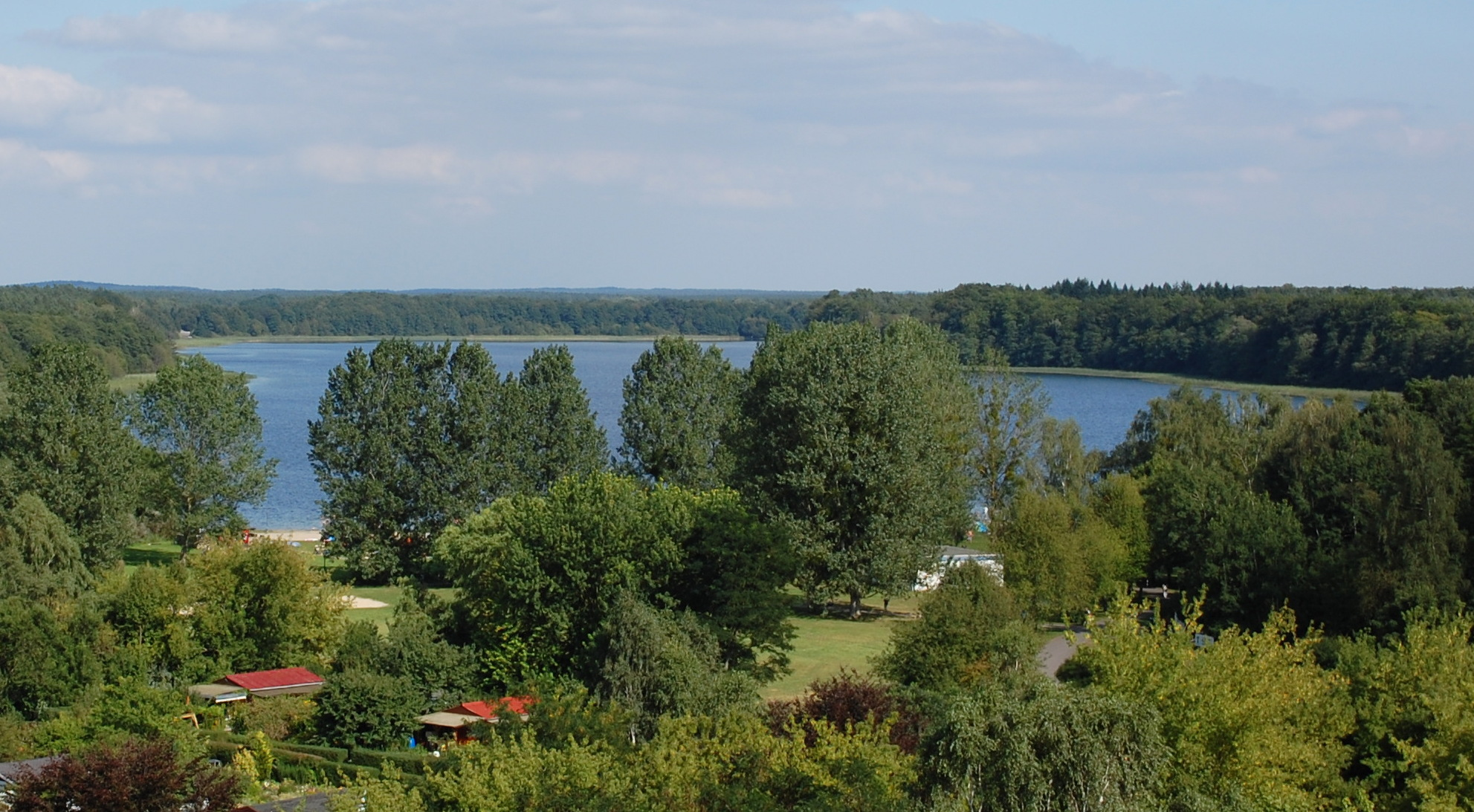
- View of the Lübbesee from the Seehotel Templin

- Location within Brandenburg
- Location: Brandenburg
- Coordinates: 53°5′59″N 13°34′12″E
- Primary inflows: none
- Primary outflows: none
- Basin countries: Germany
- Surface area: 3 km^{2} (1.2 sq mi)
- Max. depth: 13 m (43 ft)
- Settlements: Templin, Ahrensdorf, Ahlimbsmühle

Lübbesee is a lake in Brandenburg, Germany, located in the town of Templin. Its surface area is 3 km^{2}.
