= Pulverturm, Templin =

Tower in Templin

Coordinates: 53°07′11″N 13°30′14″E

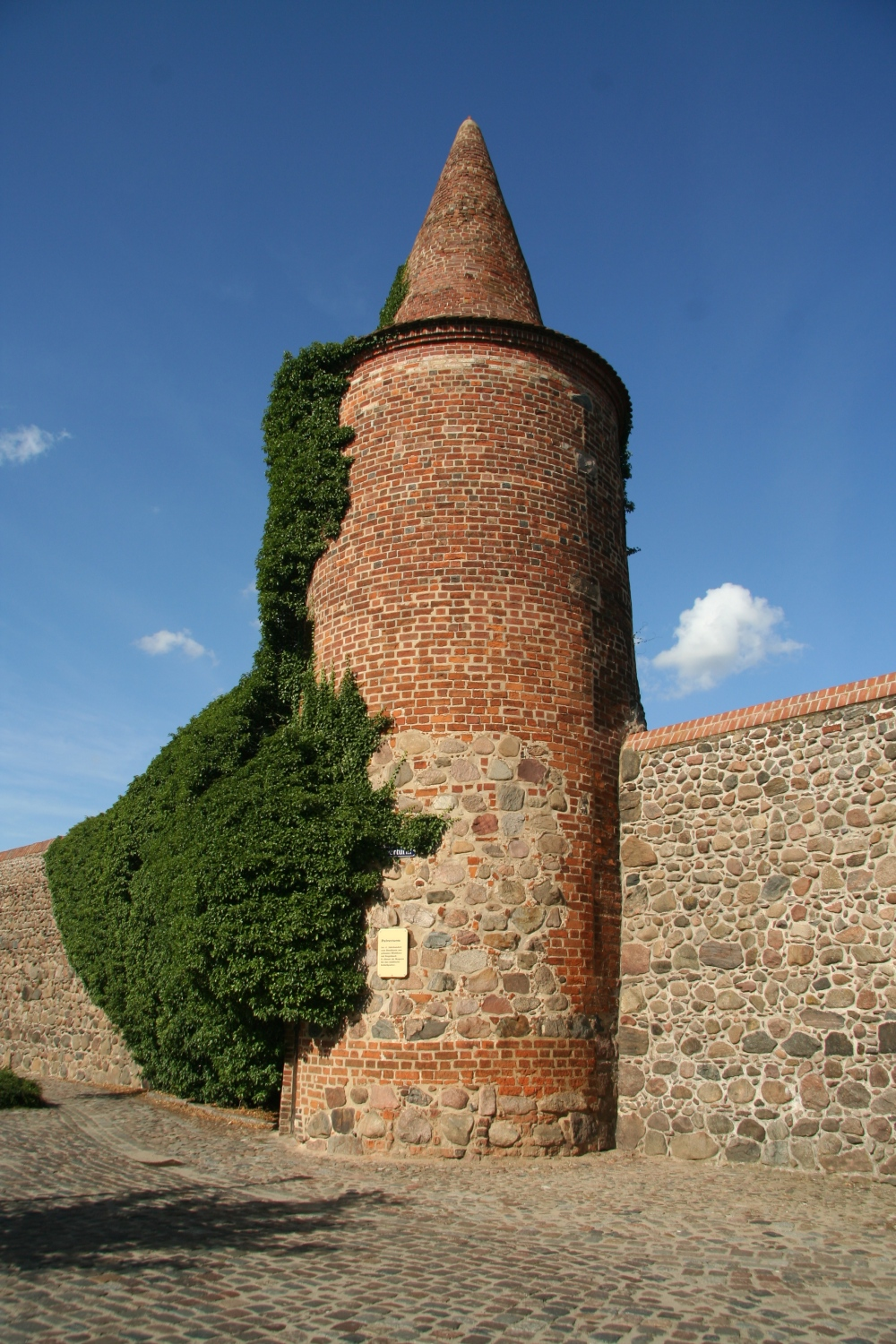
The Pulverturm in 2009

The Pulverturm in Templin is a tower on the old town fortifications of Templin in Brandenburg.

It is located in the eastern part of Templin's Altstadt not far from the Prenzlau Gate. The tower was built in the early 15th century from an old semi-circular defensive structure called a Wiekhaus in the Templin town wall, which itself is a protected monument. It is made of brick and was covered by a massive brick conical spire. Because the roof was solid, it was nonflammable and acted as a powder tower for the storage of gunpowder.

== Literature ==
- Kristina Krüger, Dehio, Handbuch der Deutschen Kunstdenkmäler, Brandenburg, Deutscher Kunstverlag München Berlin 2000, ISBN 3-422-03054-9, p. 1046.
- Max Lobedan, Helmut Schmertosch, Templin und Umgebung, Stadt-Bild-Verlag Leipzig 1998, ISBN 3-931554-67-8, page 19.
