= Pulverturm, Andernach =

Coordinates: 50°26′20.3″N 7°24′17.4″E

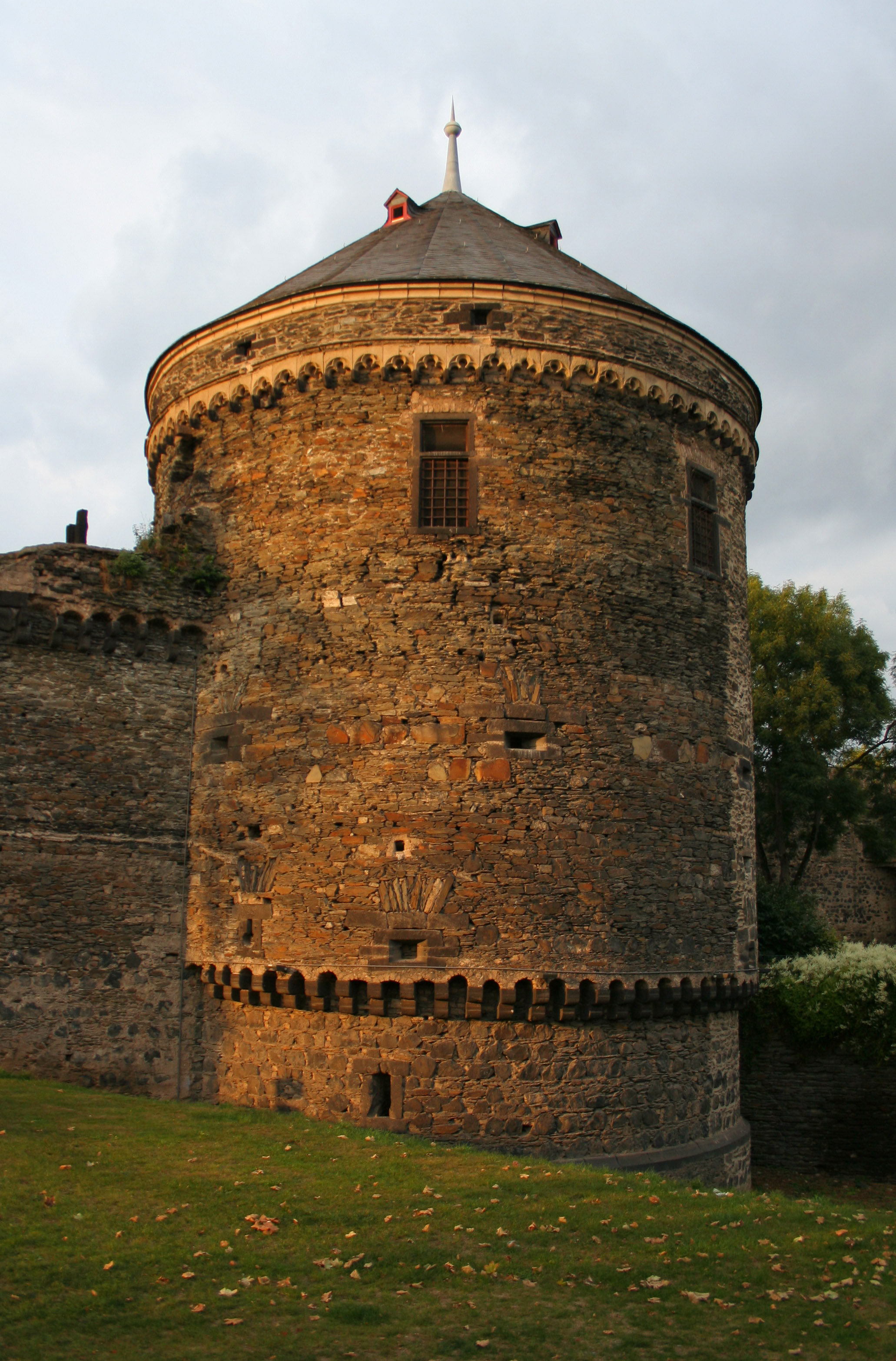
The Pulverturm from the west

The Pulverturm in Andernach is a tower that is part of the archiepiscopal-Electorate of Cologne castle at Andernach and, at the same time, a fortified tower in the town fortifications. It was built in 1519 at the behest of the Archbishop of Cologne and Prince-Elector Hermann V of Wied as part of the expansion and reinforcement of the already c. 300-year-old Stadtburg and town wall. It was built on the south side of the palas and marked the southwestern corner of the Electoral Cologne castle site.

The tower, which today is 18 metres high, has a c. 13-metre-high, cylindrical, three-storey core with a diameter of c. 12 metres with a trefoil frieze of tuff stone that runs all the way round about 1.60 metres below the base of the conical roof. Another arched frieze runs around the tower at ground level, below which the outer wall is recessed by around 30 cm at a height of 1.50 metres, before widening again by about 20 cm. This area on the base of the tower below the ground level was the wall of the castle moat on the tower side in this area. The pitch of the original roof of the tower is unknown, but in medieval times it may have been significantly steeper and higher. After its destruction in 1689 it stood for almost 300 years as a roofless ruin. In 1980/1981 quite a number of renovation works were undertaken, especially on the eight surviving fortified towers of the town wall, in the course of which the Pulverturm was renewed. The destroyed outer wall of the tower was rebuilt and a new slate-covered spire and finial was added in 1981. The tower and the bergfried are the only intact buildings of the Electoral Cologne water castle.

== Literature ==
- Andernach Kulturamt: Tore und Türme der Stadt Andernach. Sonderausstellung Stadtmuseum Andernach, 1984
- Hans Hunder: Andernach. Darstellungen zur Geschichte der Stadt. Stadtverwaltung Andernach, 1986
