= Lehmann-Garten =

Botanical garden in Brandenburg, Germany

Coordinates: 53.1252°N 13.5274°E

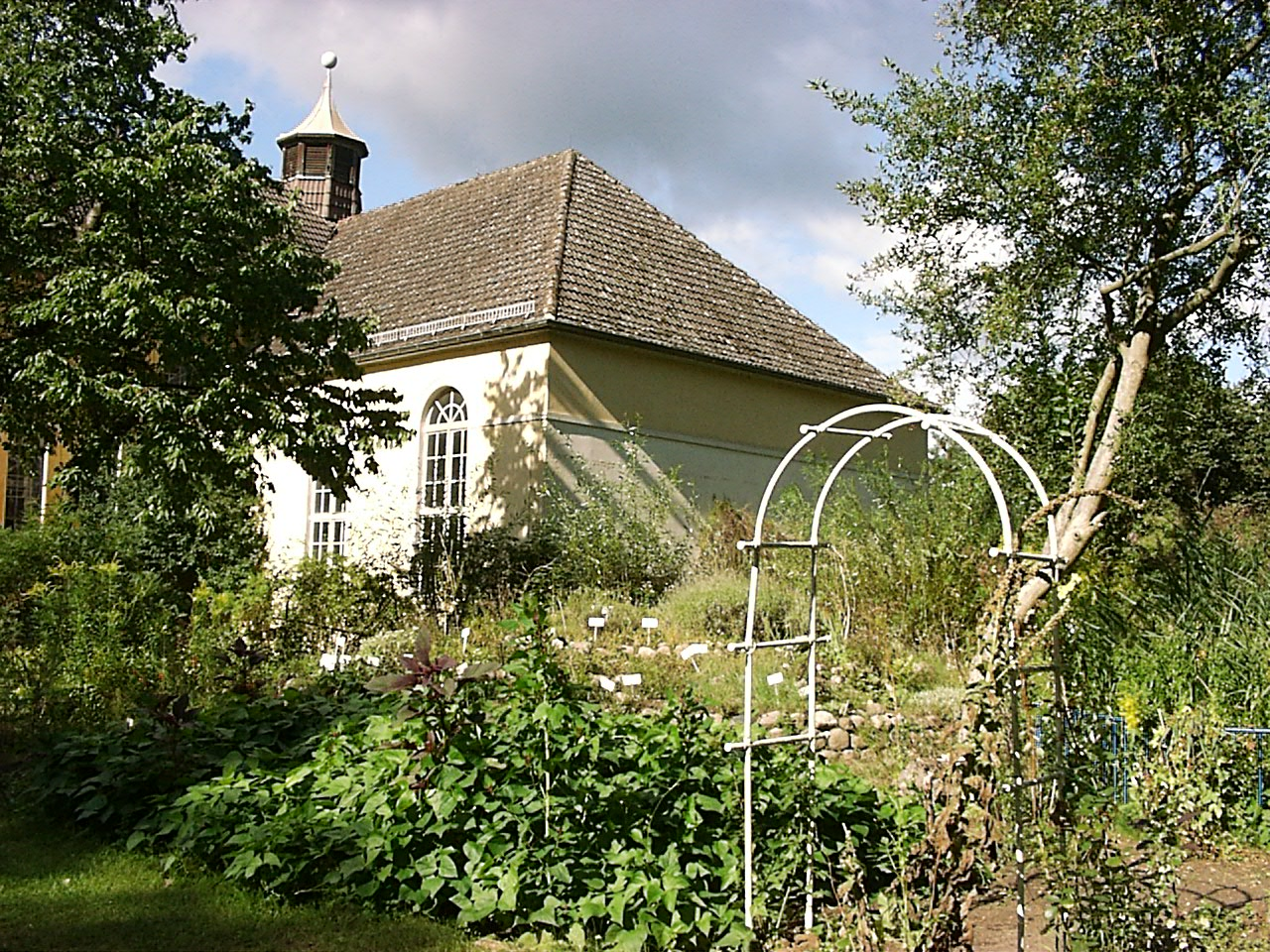
Lehmann-Garten

The Lehmann-Garten (2,500 m^{2}) is a botanical garden located at Prenzlauer Allee 28, Templin, Brandenburg, Germany. It is open Wednesday mornings without charge.

The garden was originally established in 1912 by Professor Gustav Lehmann on the grounds of the Joachimsthalschen Gymnasium, and used for educational and experimental purposes. It was recreated in 1988-1989 as a project of the Association for the Conservation and Reclamation of Crops in Brandenburg (Verein zur Erhaltung und Rekultivierung von Nutzpflanzen in Brandenburg), and used primarily by Gymnasium students for classes in advanced genetics. In winter herbal teas are served from 15 kinds of plants harvested from the garden.

== See also ==
- List of botanical gardens in Germany
