= Pulverturm, Leutkirch im Allgäu =

Tower in Leutkirch im Allgäu, Baden-Württemberg, Germany

Coordinates: 47°49′31.3″N 10°1′32.1″E

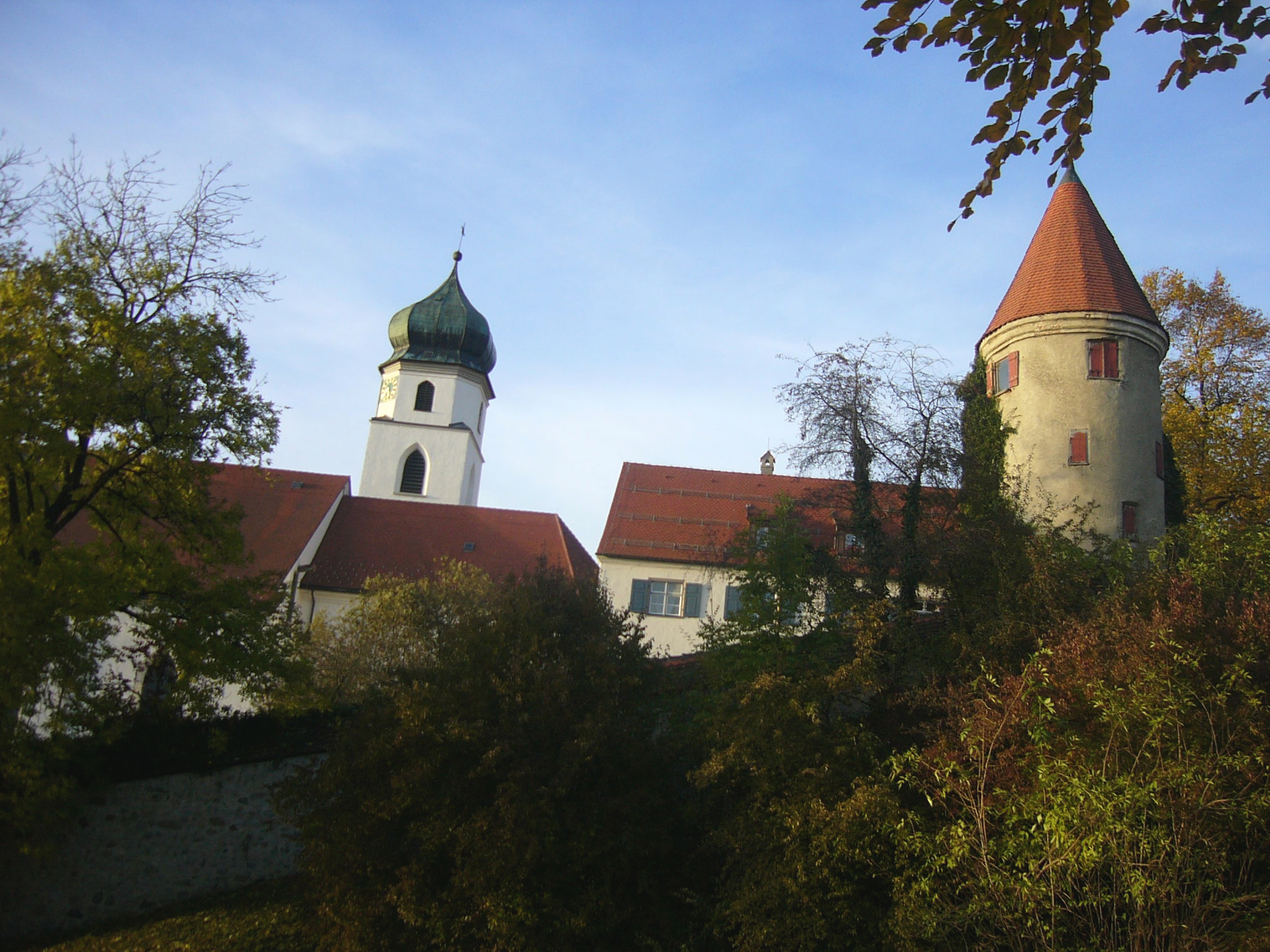
St. Martin's Church and the Powder Tower (r)

The Leutkirch Pulverturm or Leutkirch Powder Tower (German: Pulverturm) was built towards the end of the 17th century on the southeast corner of Leutkirch im Allgäu, Baden-Württemberg, Germany, as part of the rebuilding of the collapsed town wall. The powder tower was used to store gunpowder, was sold by the town in 1804 and, since 1918, has been in municipal ownership again. It is listed as a cultural monument by the town of Leutkirch.
