= Powder tower =

Tower designed to store gunpowder

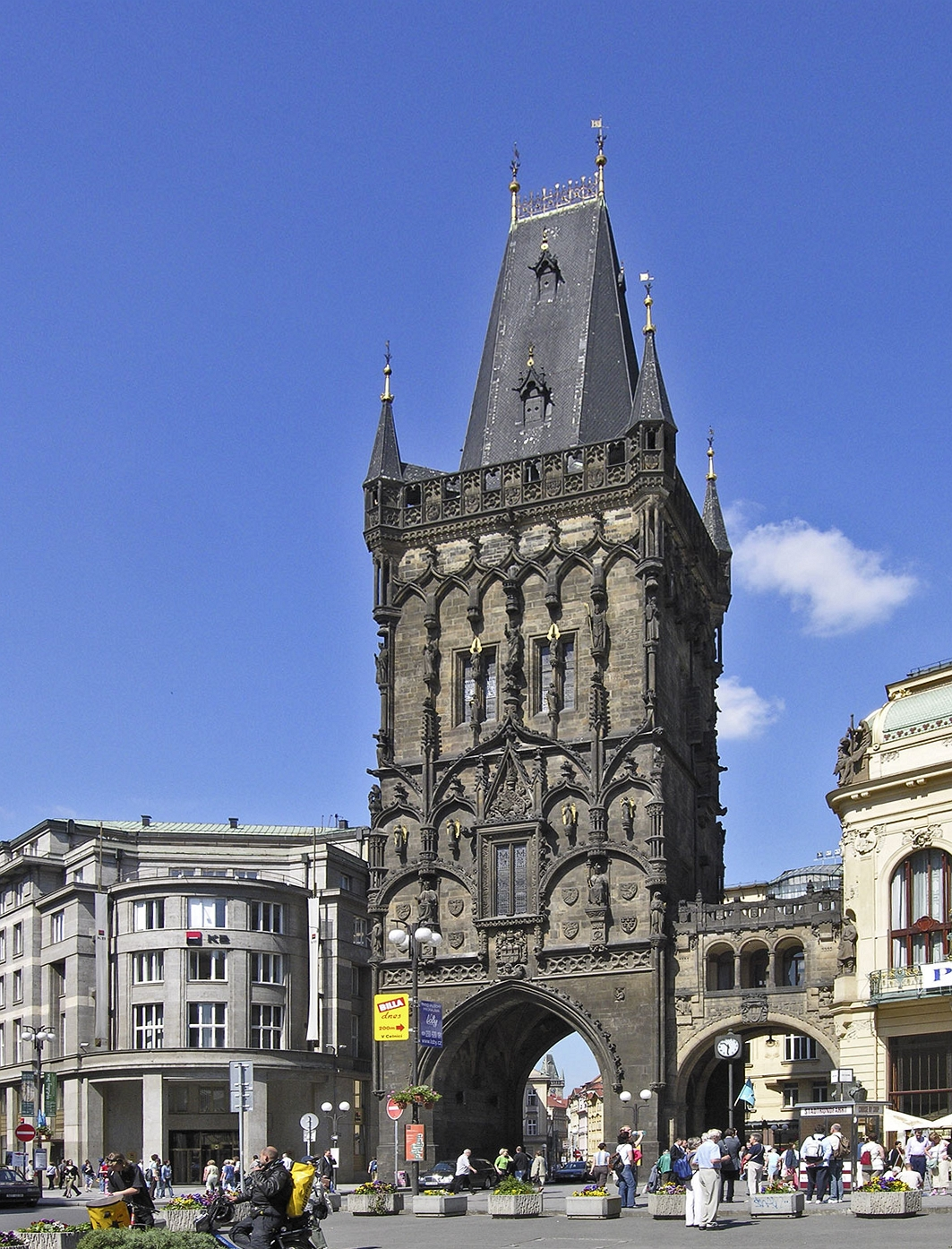
The powder tower of Prague

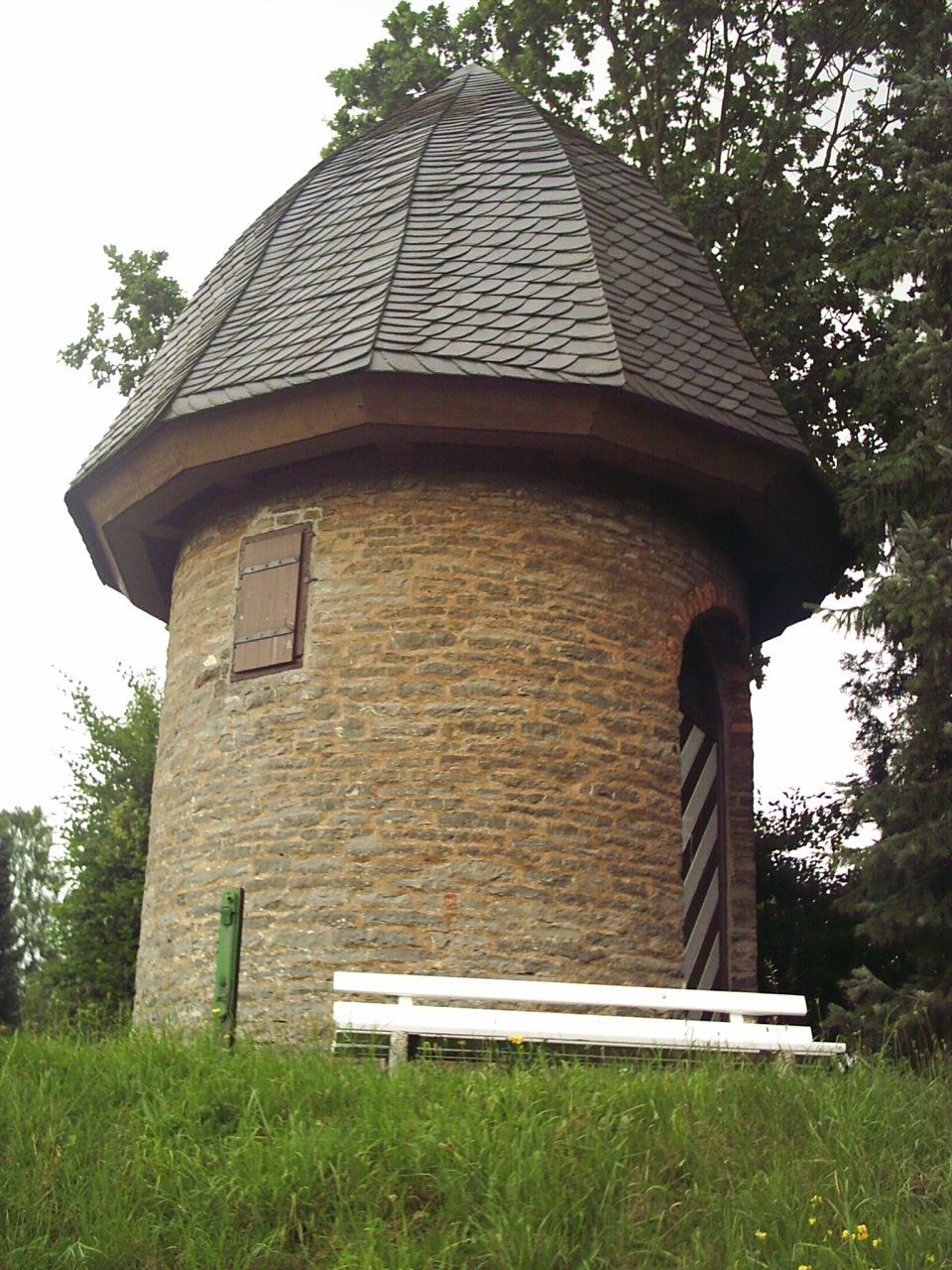
The powder tower in Meschede

A powder tower (German: Pulverturm), occasionally also powder house (Pulverhaus), was a building used by the military or by mining companies, frequently a tower, to store gunpowder or, later, explosives. They were common until the 20th century, but were increasingly succeeded by gunpowder magazines and ammunition depots. The explosion of a powder tower could be catastrophic as, for example, in the Delft Explosion of 1654.

== List of powder towers ==
Buildings formerly used as powder towers include the following:

=== Germany ===
These are sorted by states of Germany, since there are so many.

==== Baden-Württemberg ====
- Pulverturm, Leutkirch im Allgäu
- Pulverturm, Vellberg

==== Bavaria ====
- Pulverturm, Bad Reichenhall
- Pulverturm, Burghausen
- Färberturm, Gunzenhausen
- Pulverturm, Lindau
- Pulverturm, Memmingen
- Pulverturm, Munich
- Pulverturm, Ochsenfurt
- Pulverturm, Straubing

==== Brandenburg ====
- Pulverturm, Templin

==== Bremen ====
- Bremer Pulvertürme

==== Lower Saxony ====
- Pulverturm, Bad Bentheim
- Knochenturm in Einbeck
- Pulverturm, Hameln
- Pulverturm Lingen, Ems
- Pulverturm, Oldenburg

==== Mecklenburg-Vorpommern ====
- Pulverturm, Anklam

The Pulverturm, Demmin, bears the name, but was probably not used for this purpose.

==== North Rhine-Westphalia ====
- Langer Turm, Aachen
- Pulvertürmchen in Aachen
- Pulverturm, Meschede
- Buddenturm in Münster
- Pulverturm, Rheinberg
- Pulverturm, Wiedenbrück

==== Rhineland-Palatinate ====
- Pulverturm, Andernach
- Pulverturm, Linz am Rhein
- Pulverturm, Mainz

==== Saxony ====
- Pulverturm, Johanngeorgenstadt
- Pulverturm in Zwickau

==== Saxony-Anhalt ====
- Pulverturm, Quedlinburg

==== Thuringia ====
- Pulverturm, Greiz
- Pulverturm, Jena

=== Austria ===
- Pulverturm, Krems

=== Czechia ===
- Despite its name the Powder Tower in Prague was never actually used to store gunpowder

=== Italy ===
- Pulverturm, Schlanders

=== Latvia ===
- Powder Tower, Riga (Pulvertornis)

=== Namibia ===
- Powder Tower, Otjimbingwe, Namibia

=== Switzerland ===
- Malteserturm in Chur
- Pulverturm, Merano
- Pulverturm, Zofingen

=== USA ===
- Powder House (Dedham, Massachusetts)

== Gallery ==
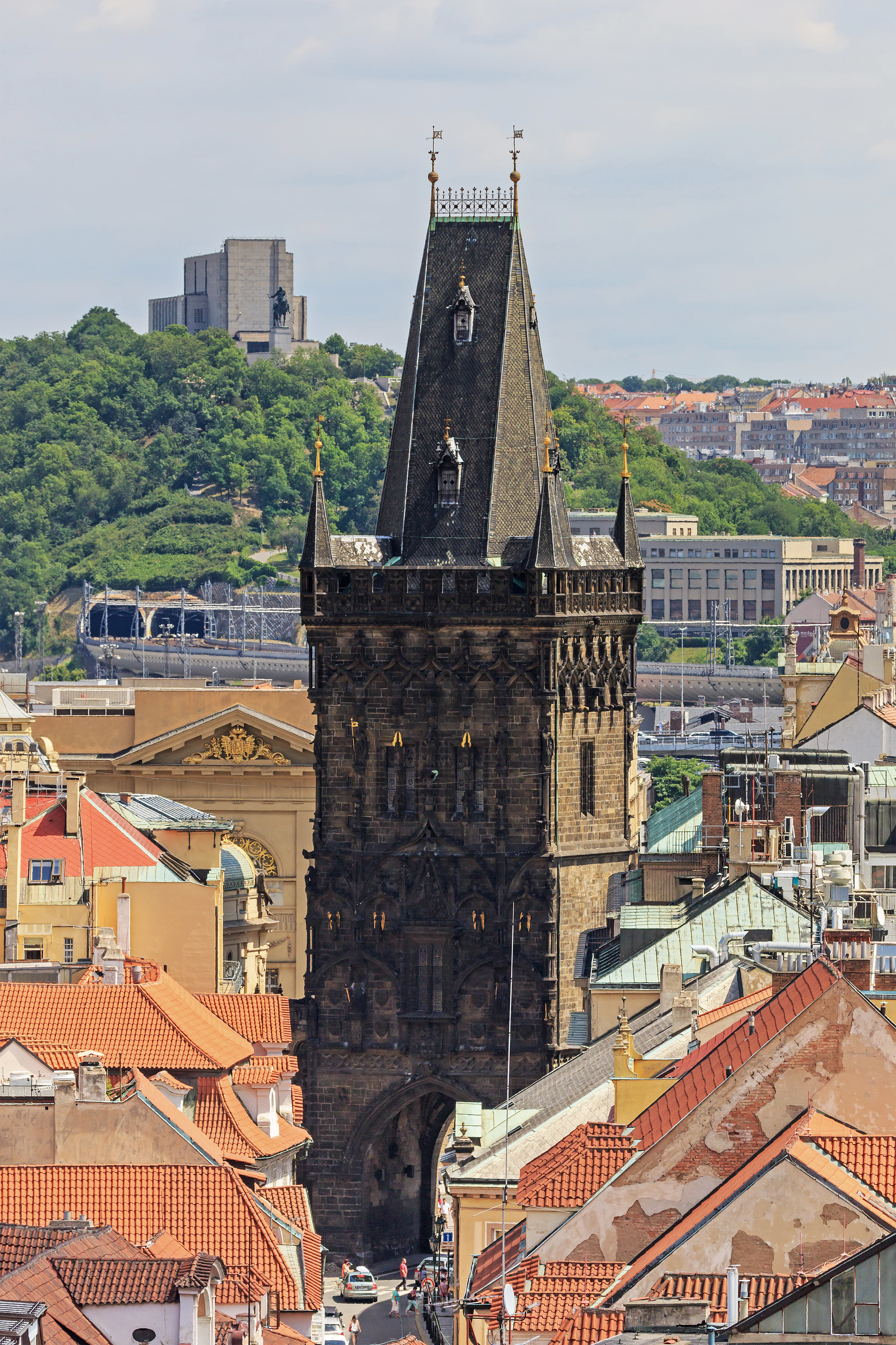
The Powder Tower in Prague

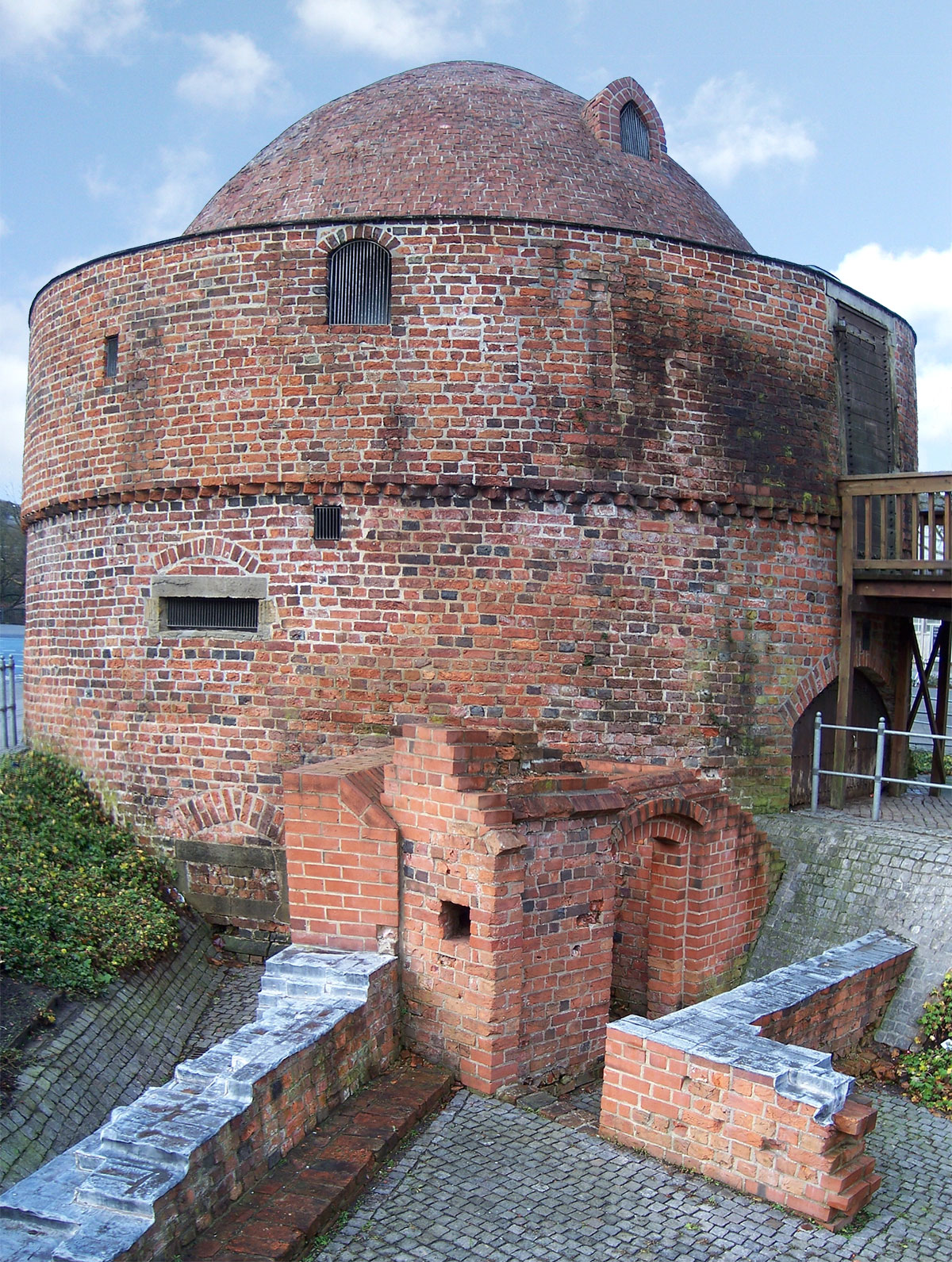
Pulverturm in Oldenburg with remains of the old town wall

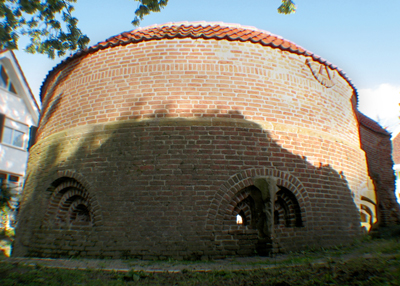
Pulverturm Wiedenbrück, exterior view

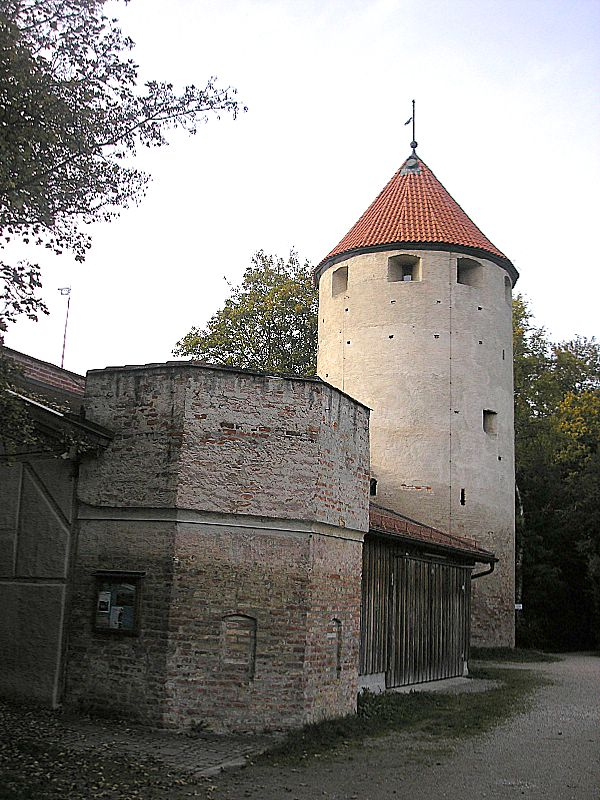
Pulverturm in Landsberg am Lech

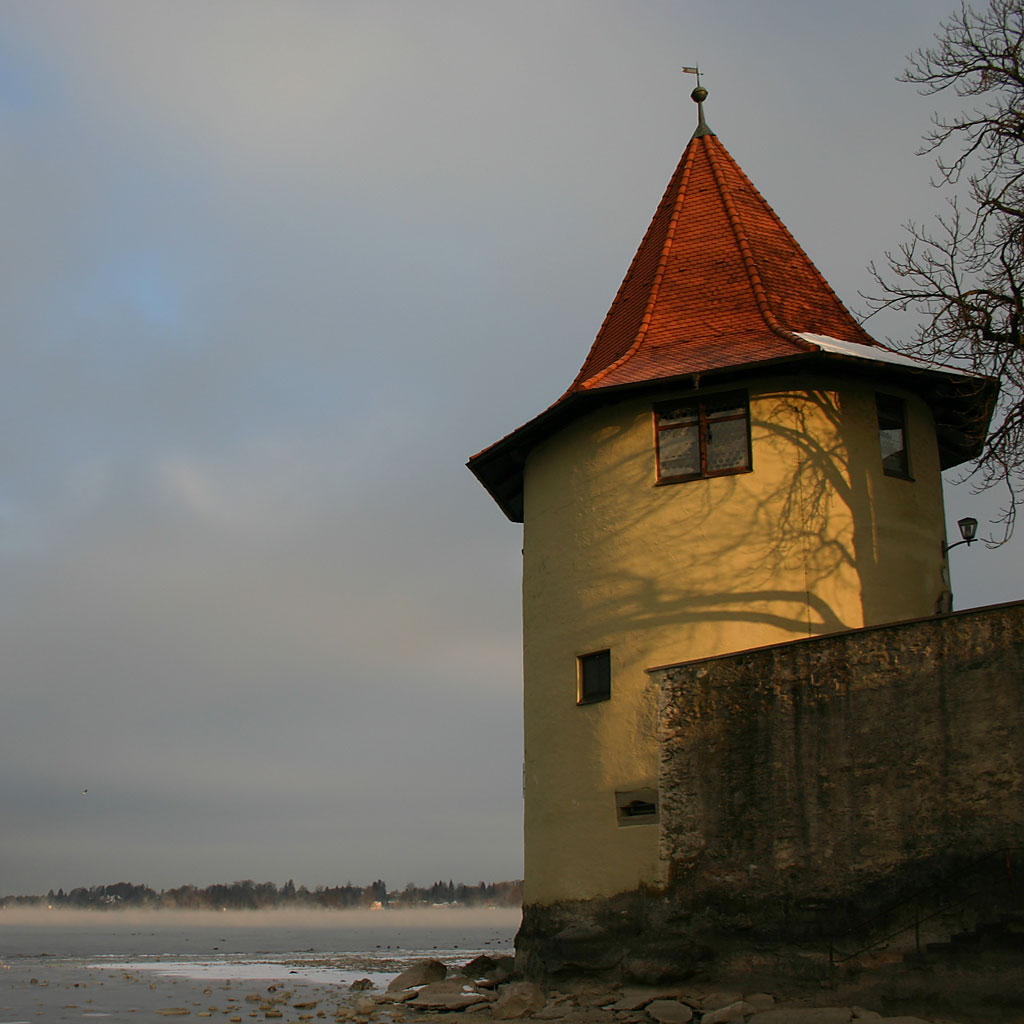
Pulverturm in Lindau

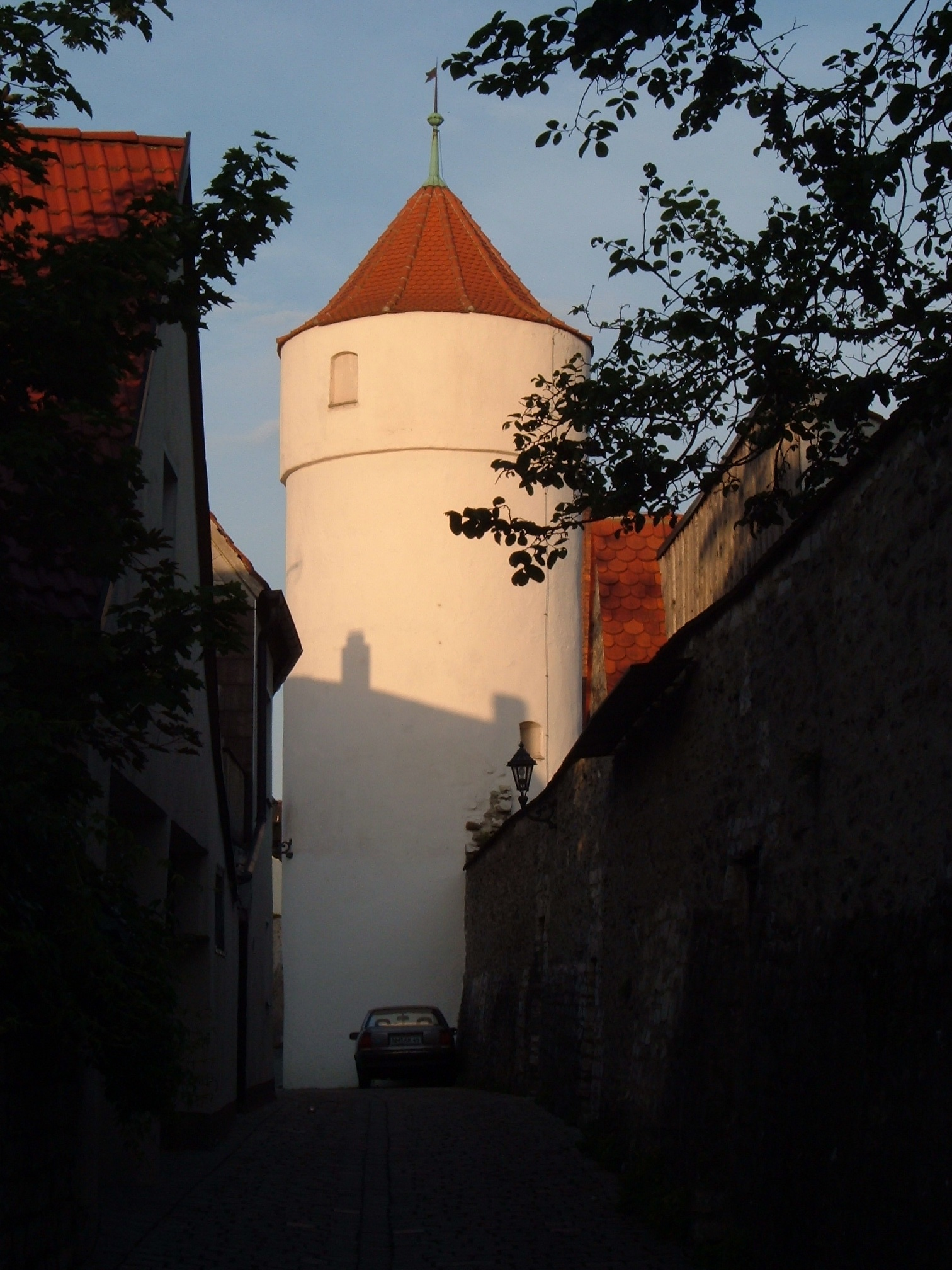
Pulverturm in Neumarkt in the Upper Palatinate

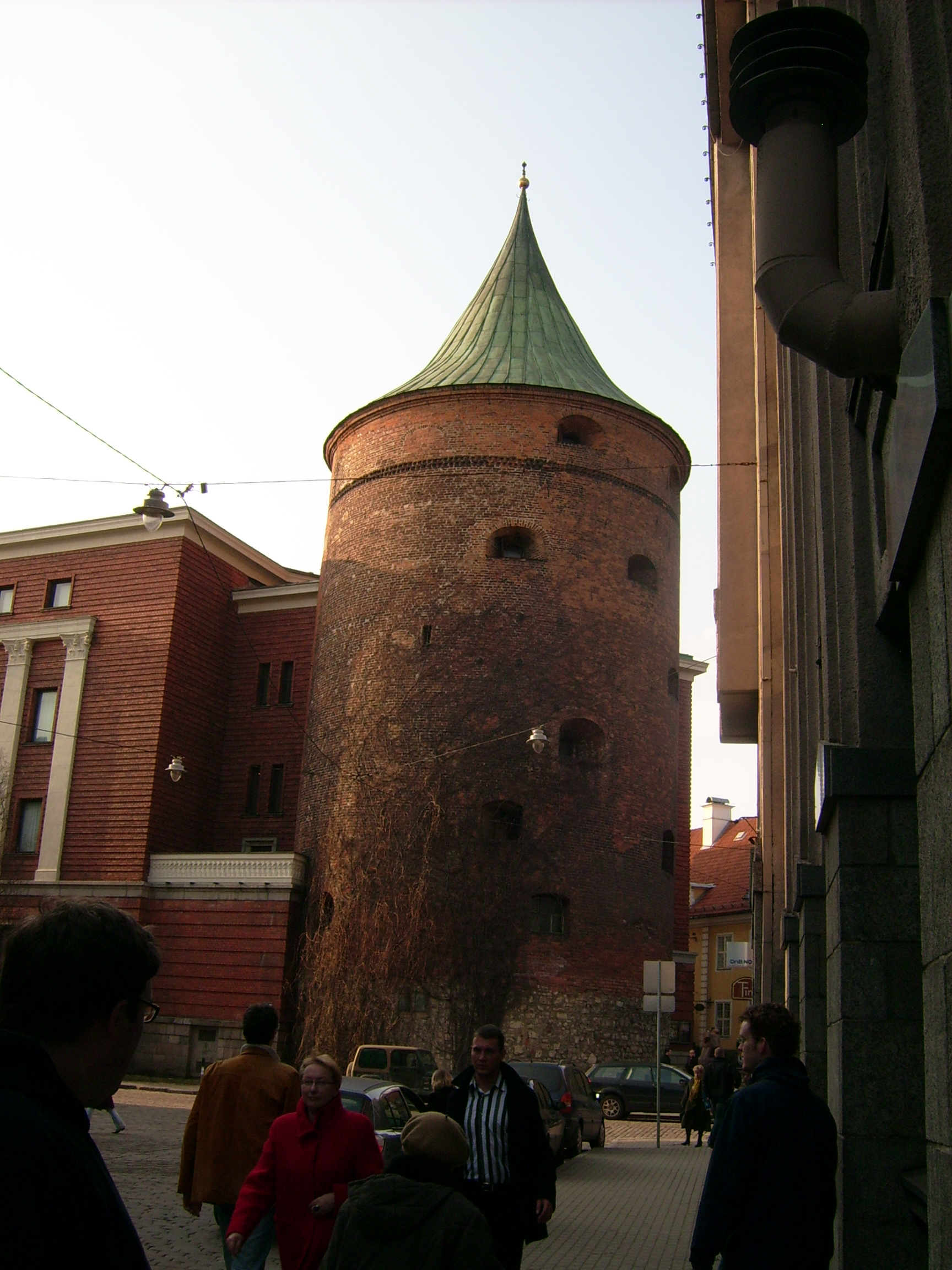
Pulverturm in Riga

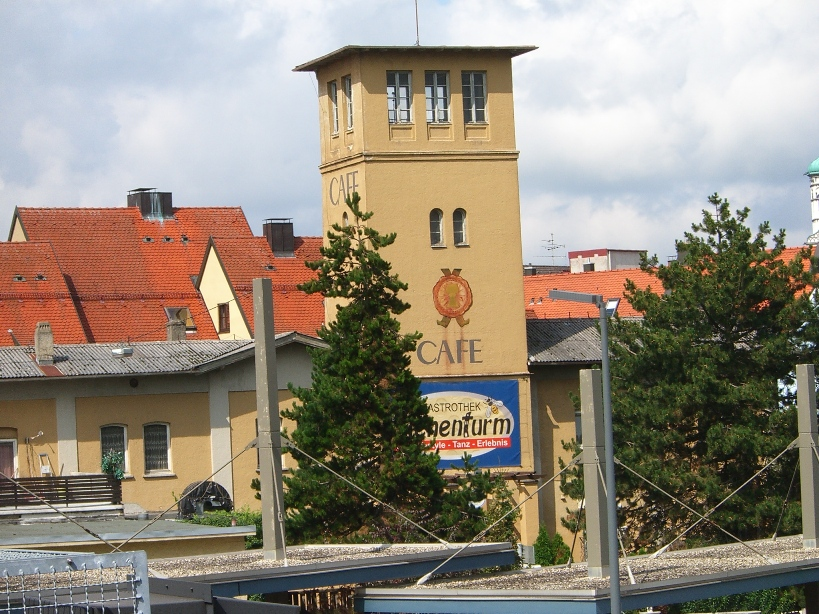
Pulverturm in Memmingen

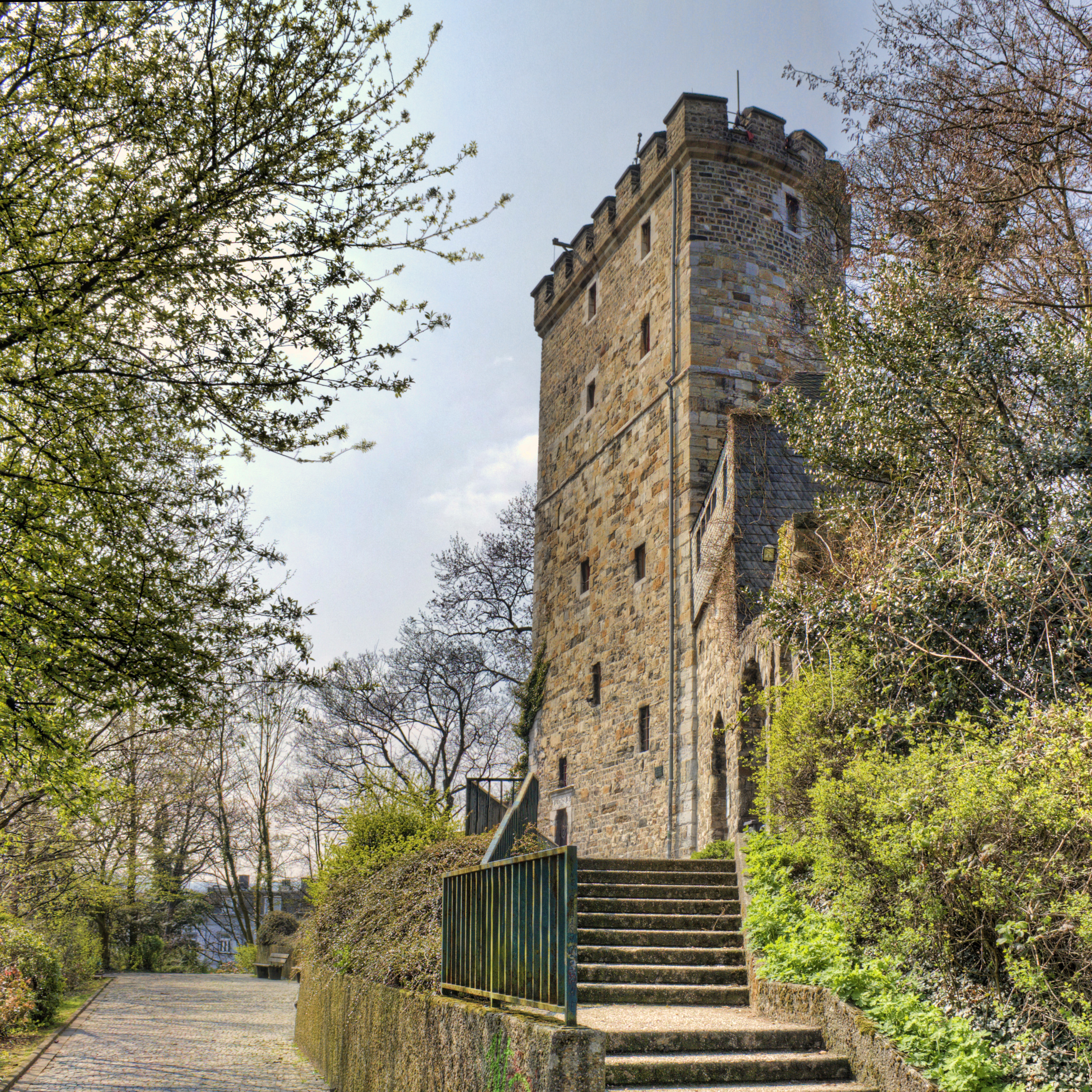
Langer Turm in Aachen

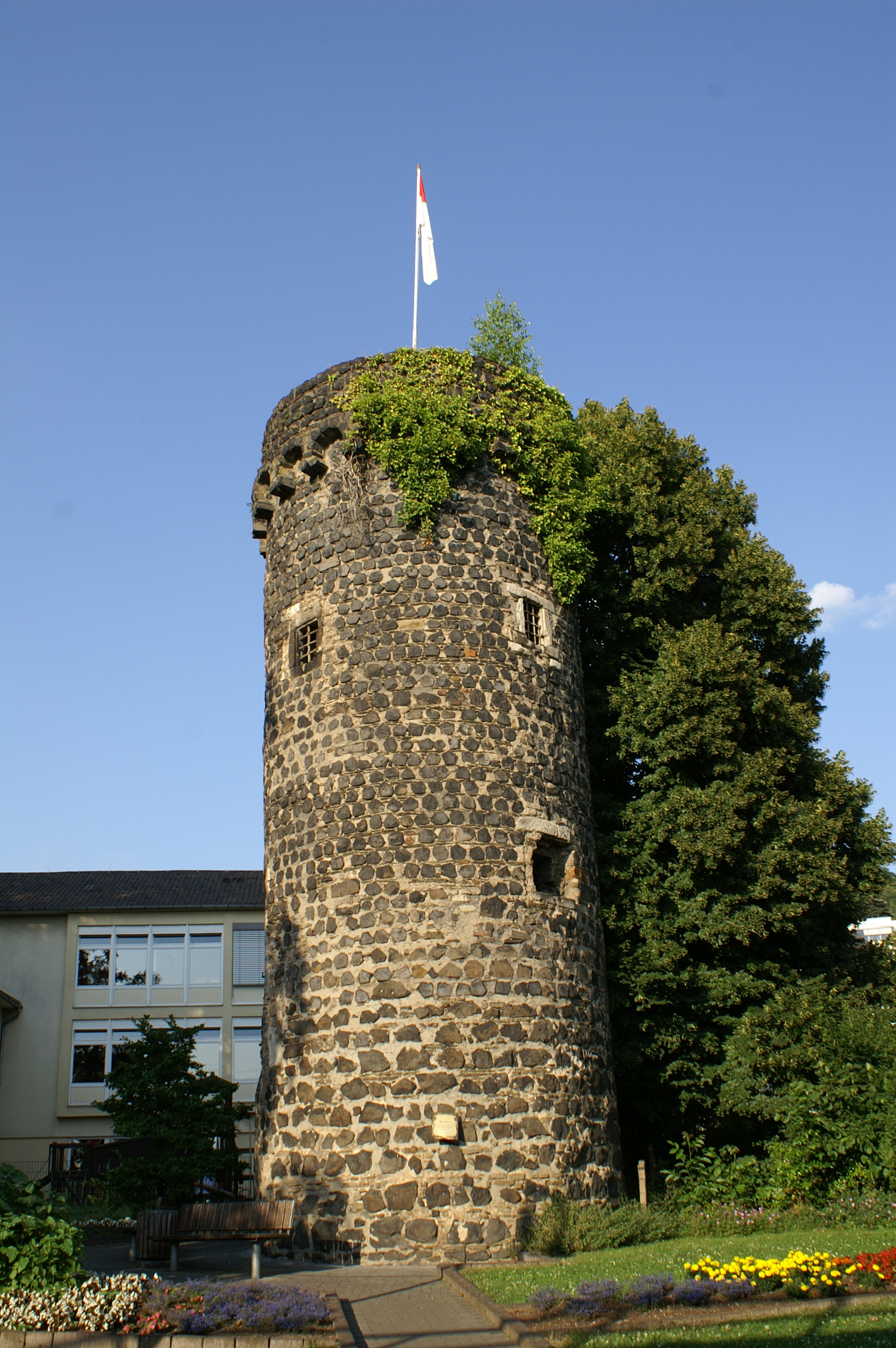
Pulverturm in Linz am Rhein

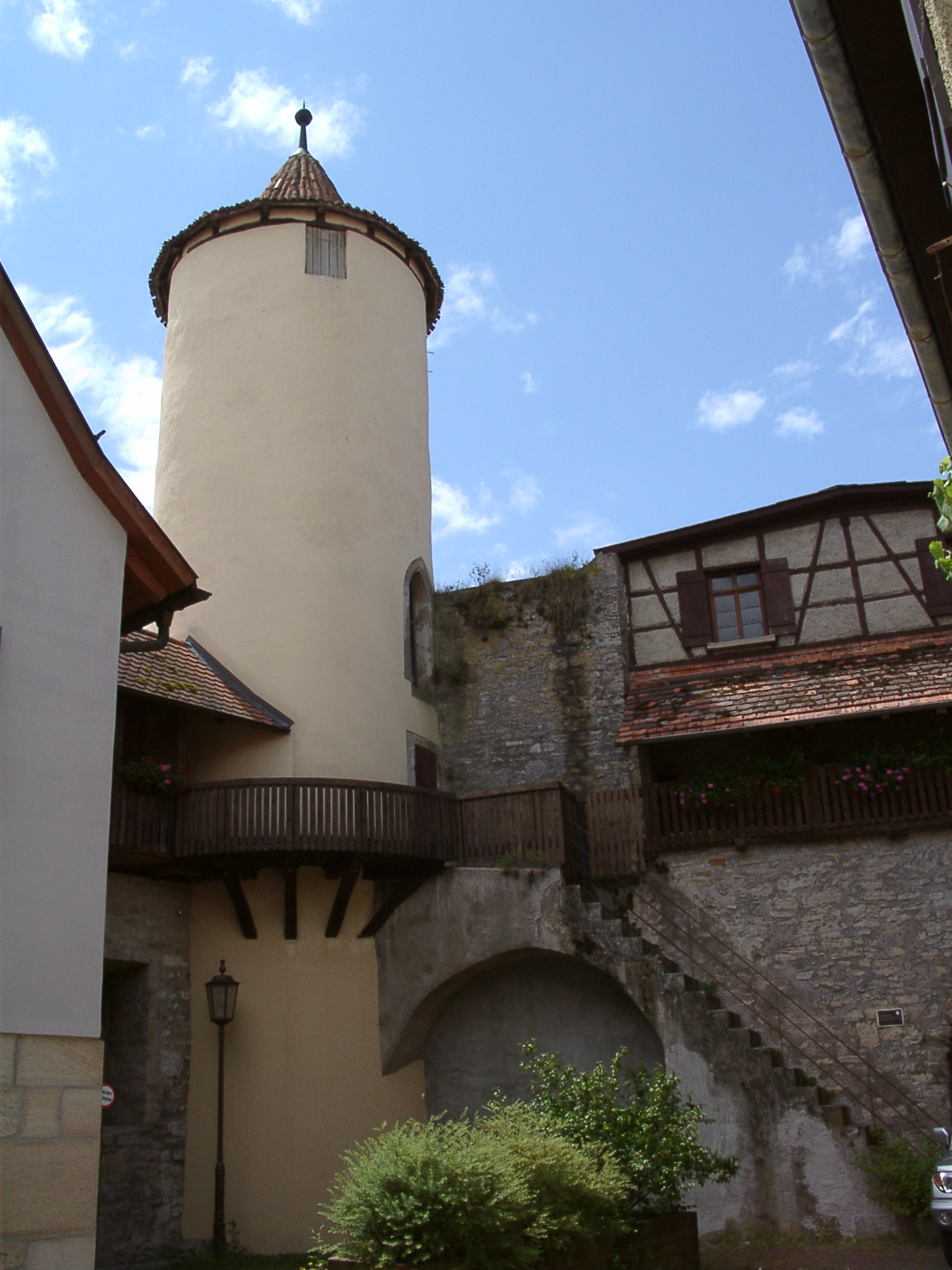
Pulverturm in Rottenburg/Neckar

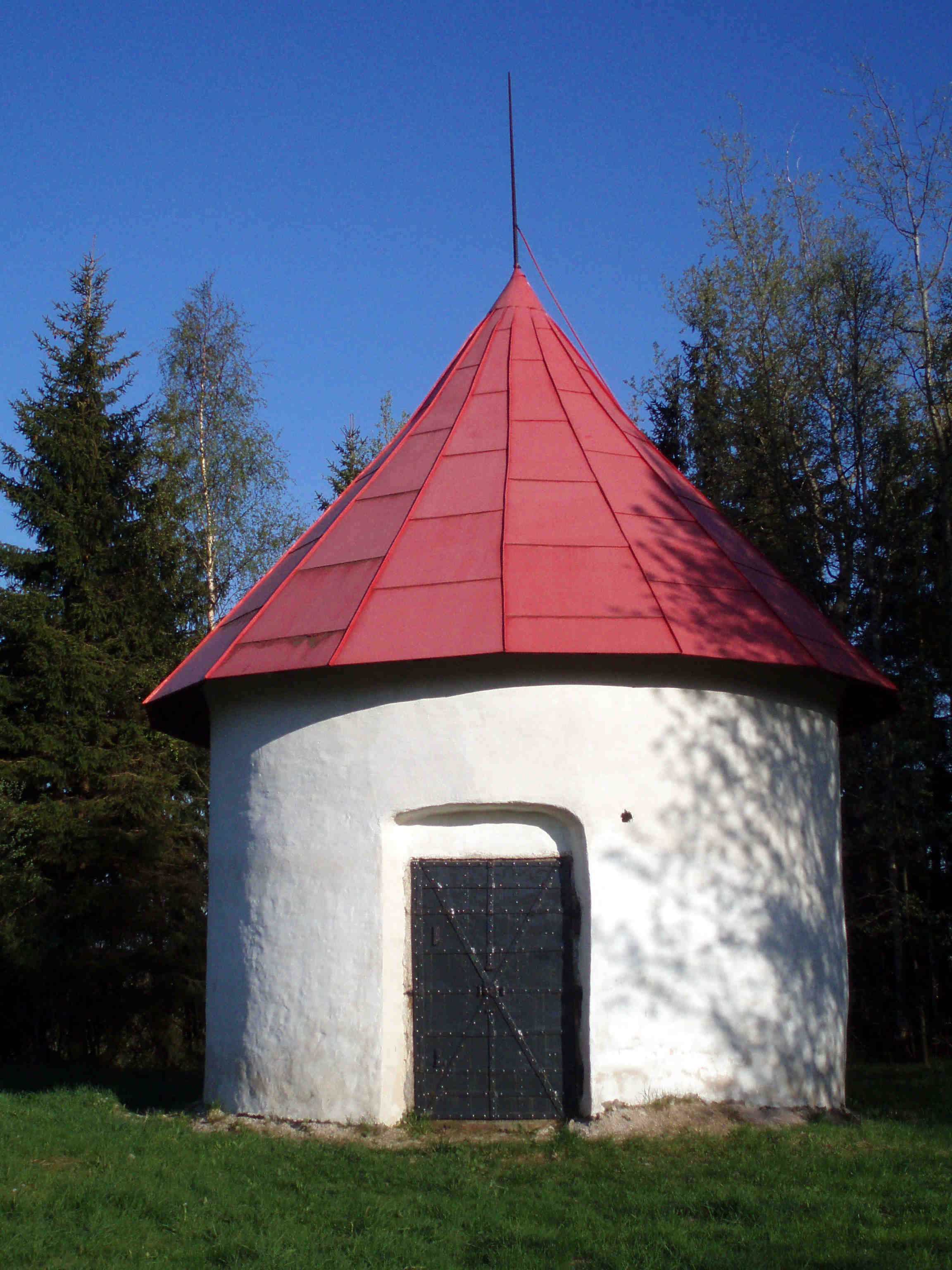
Pulverturm in Johanngeorgenstadt

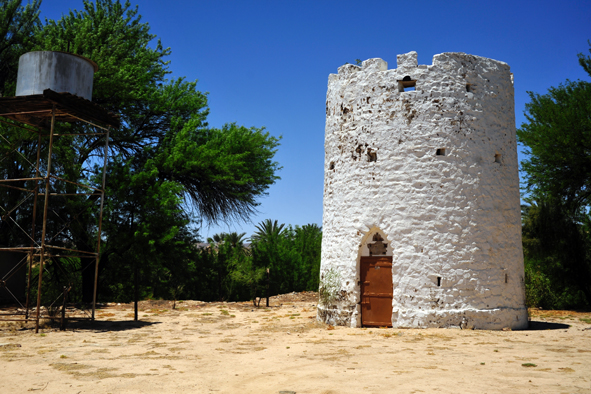
Pulverturm in Otjimbingwe, Namibia

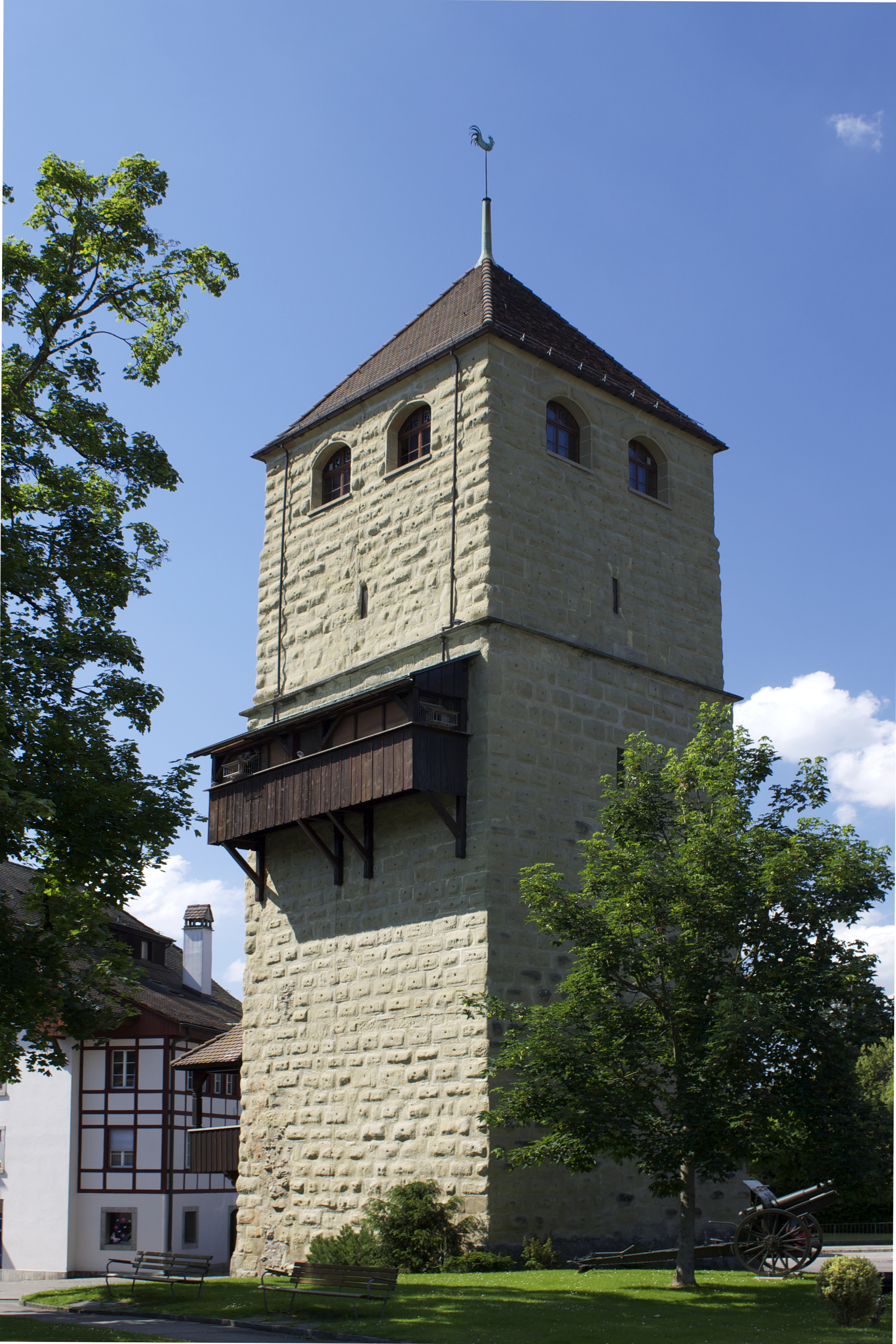
Pulverturm in Zofingen

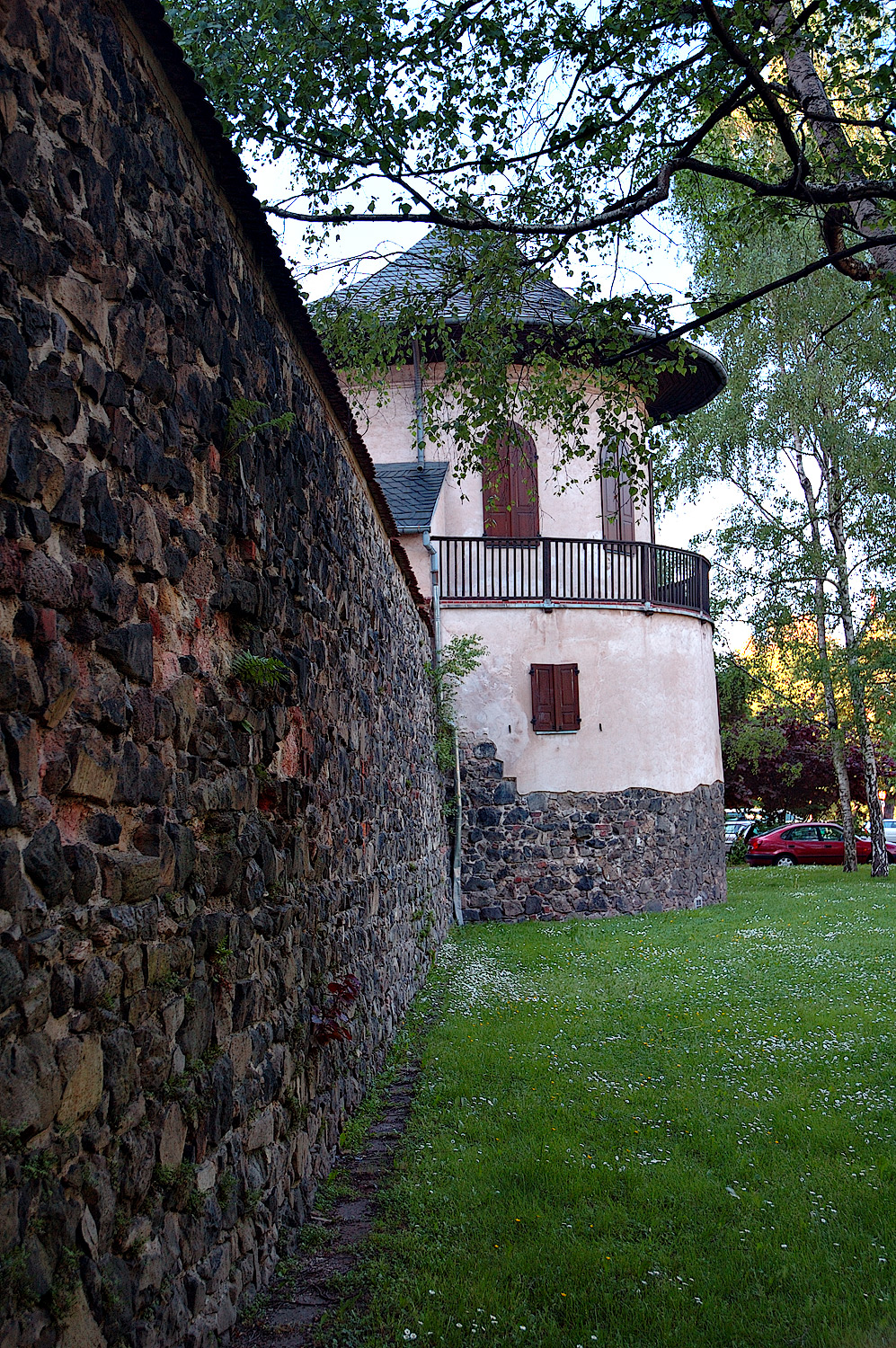
Pulverturm in Zwickau

== Literature ==
- Adolf Weinbrenner: Pulvermagazin, in Otto Lueger (ed.): Lexikon der gesamten Technik und ihrer Hilfswissenschaften, Vol. 7 Stuttgart, Leipzig 1909, pp. 274–275; digitalised at zeno.org
- Brewer, Ted (1999). Czech and Slovak Republics Guide. Londres: Open Road Publishing.
- Legal, Claus; Legal, Gert (2020). Friedrich II. von Preußen und Quintus Icilius: Der König und der Obrist. Munique: utzverlag GmbH.
- Prokopovych, Markian (2009). Habsburg Lemberg: Architecture, Public Space, and Politics in the Galician Capital, 1772-1914. Lafaiete Oeste, Indiana: Imprensa da Universidade de Purdue.
