= Christa Wiese =

East German shot putter

Medal record

Women's athletics

Representing East Germany

World Indoor Championships
Bronze medal – third place	1989 Budapest	Shot put

Christa Wiese (born 25 December 1967) is a German former track and field athlete who competed for East Germany in the shot put. She was a world indoor medalist and had a best of 20.50 m (67 ft 3 in).

Born in Templin, Bezirk Neubrandenburg, she became a member of the SC Neubrandenburg sports club. She had the peak of her career in 1989 at the age of twenty-two. At the East German Indoor Athletics Championships she finished runner-up to Heike Hartwig by a margin of one centimetre. Her throw of 20.50 m (67 ft 3 in) was a lifetime best and ranked her second in world indoors that year. This performance gained her selection for the 1989 IAAF World Indoor Championships. In the final of the event in Budapest she had a throw of 19.75 m (64 ft 9 1/2 in) in the final, which brought her the bronze medal behind West Germany's Claudia Losch and Huang Zhihong of China. This was her first and only major senior medal.

In the outdoor 1989 season she cleared twenty metres exactly at a meet in Schwerin – a mark which placed her in the top ten outdoors that year. Although she did not appear in major international competition in 1990 she ranked eleventh globally with a season's best of 19.97 m (65 ft 6 in), such was the East German women's strength in depth in shot put. She placed third nationally in the shot put both indoors and outdoors that year, which was her last at a high level.
