= Pulverturm, Oldenburg =

Coordinates: 53.1377°N 8.2140°E

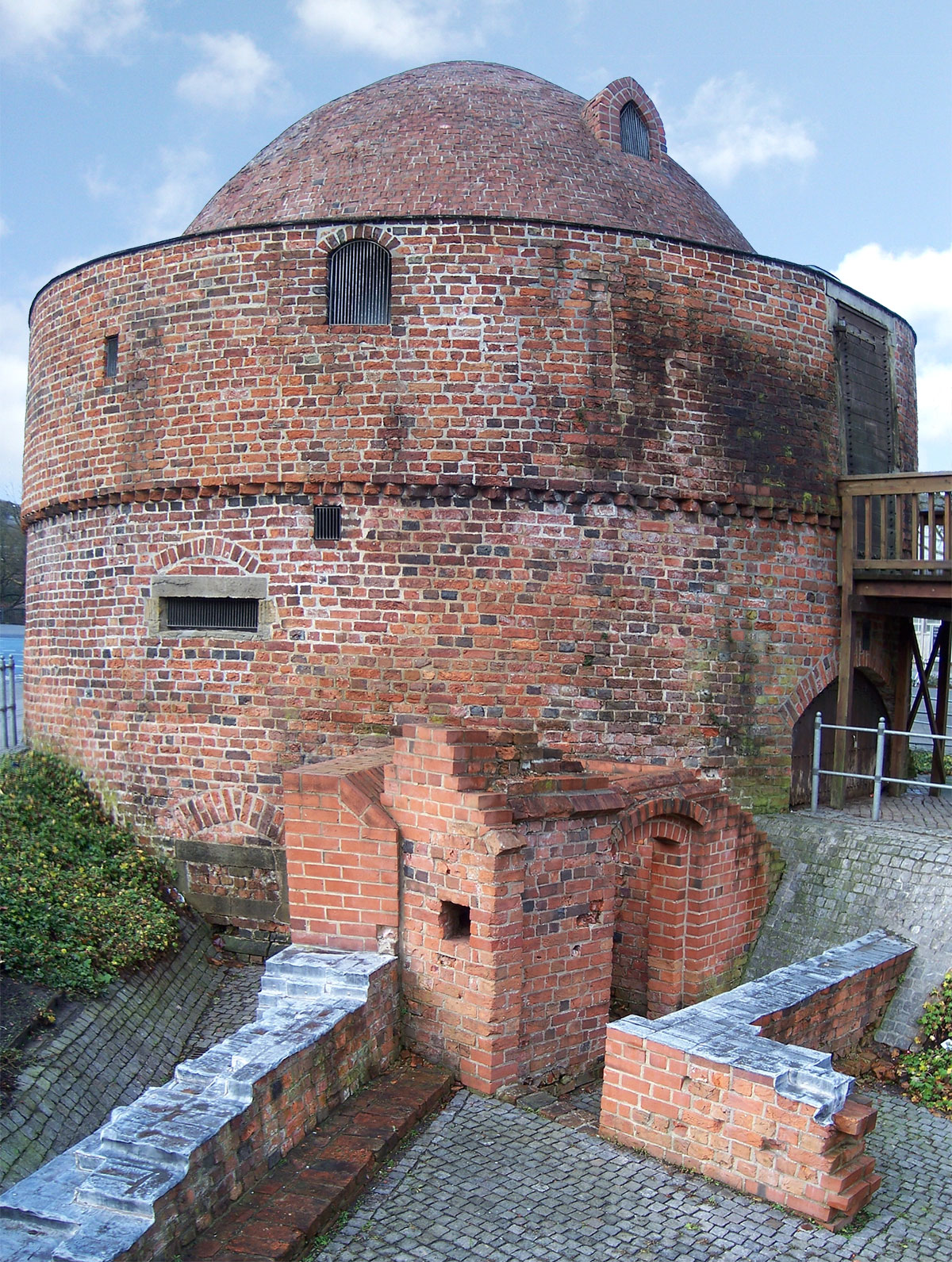
View of the Pulverturm building in Oldenburg from the southeast.

The Pulverturm is a historic brick-built powder magazine in the city of Oldenburg, Lower Saxony, Germany.

The Pulverturm is the last remaining building in Oldenburg's historic fortifications. A small part of the city wall is still attached. The building was used to store gunpowder from 1730 to 1765 during Danish rule in the area. The building is circular with a domed roof. The Pulverturm is located close to the northern corner of the Schlossgarten Oldenburg. Elisabeth-Anna-Palais is to the southeast, Schloss Oldenburg is to the east, St Lamberti-Kirche and the Rathaus are to the north, and the Oldenburgisches Staatstheater is to the northwest.

== See also ==
- List of visitor attractions in Oldenburg
