= List of tallest buildings in Hanover =

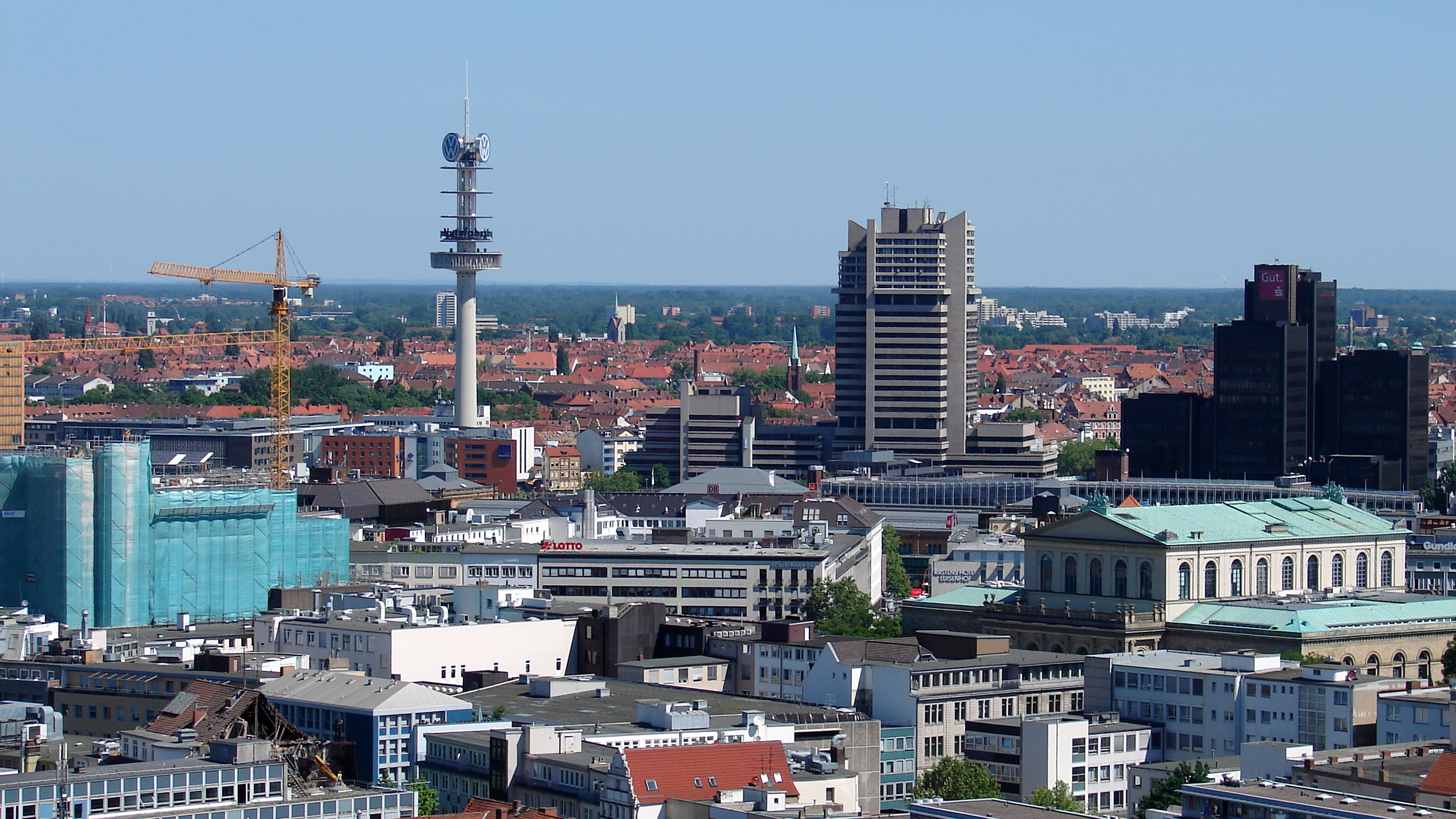
Telemoritz, Lister Tor and Sparkasse Hannover

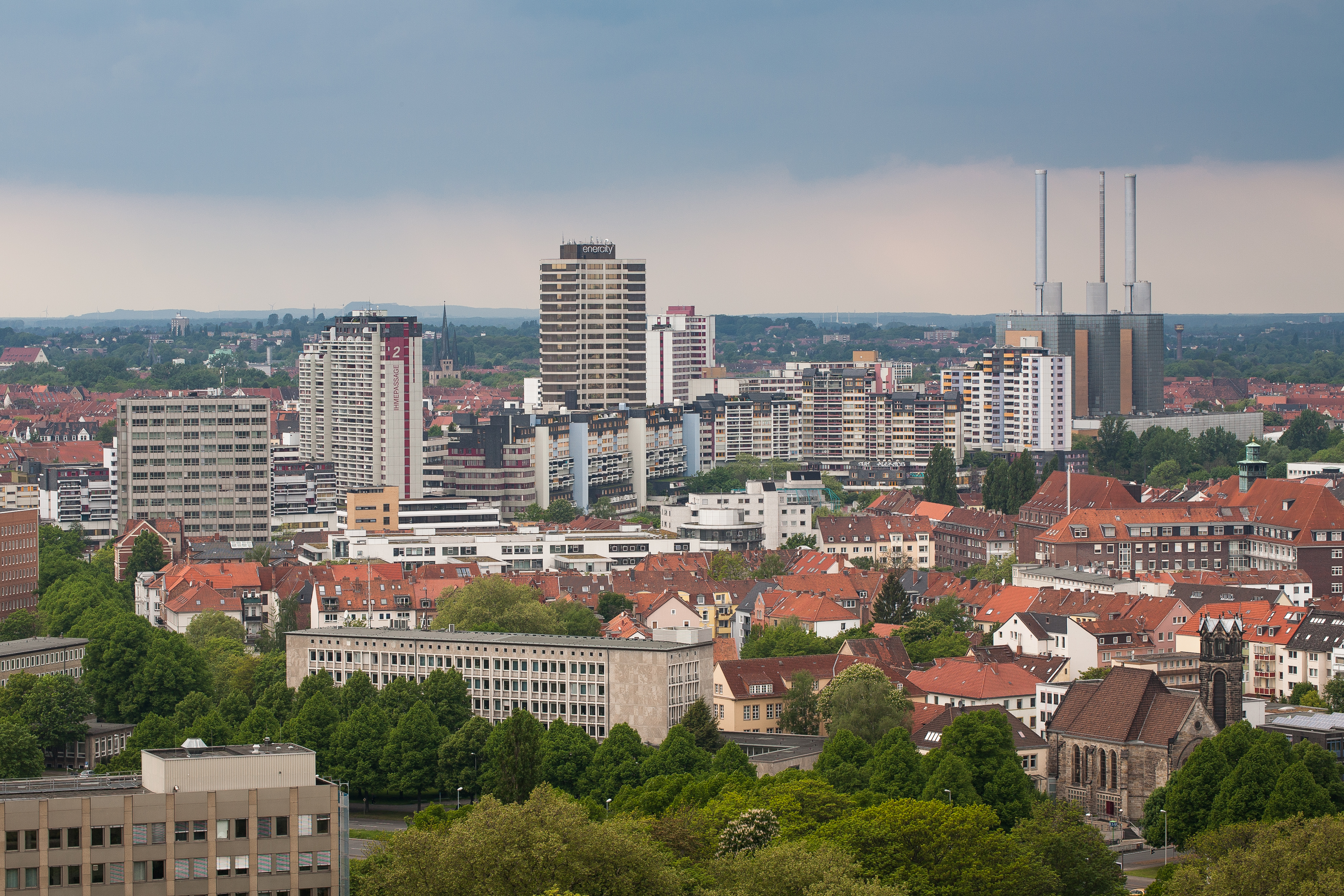
Ihme-Zentrum with Hochhaus der Stadtwerke

This list of tallest buildings in Hanover ranks high-rise buildings and important landmarks that reach a height of 50 meters (160 feet). The tallest structure in the city is by far the 282-meter-high Telemax, a television tower built in 1992.

Hannover's history of skyscrapers began 1928 with the completion of the 12 storey, 51-meter-high (167-foot) Anzeiger-Hochhaus.

Most of the high-rise buildings are concentrated in two smaller clusters. One is located in the center of Hanover, along Hamburger Allee and Raschplatz and near the main train station with Telemoritz, Lister Tor, Sparkasse Hannover, IntercityHotel and Hamburger Allee 25. The other cluster is the Ihme-Zentrum with Stadtwerke-Hochhaus, Ihmepassage 2, Ihmeplatz 1 and other residential high-rise buildings.

Rank	Name	Image	Height m (ft)	Floors	Year completed	Use / Note
	Telemax		282 m (925 ft)		1992	Telecommunications tower, Tallest structure in Hanover.
	Telemoritz (VW-Tower)		141 m (463 ft)		1959	Old television tower, Listed as a historical monument.
	Heizkraftwerk Linden		125 m (410 ft)		1962	Combined heat and power plant
	New Town Hall		97.73 m (321 ft)		1913	Seat of Hanover city administration.
	Market Church		97.26 m (319 ft)		1366	Tallest church tower in Hanover, Lutheran church
1	Hochhaus der Stadtwerke		92 m (302 ft)	23	1975	Seat of Stadtwerke Hannover (now enercity), Part of Ihme-Zentrum
2	Hochhaus Lister Tor (Bredero Hochhaus)		91 m (299 ft)	23	1975	Office
	Hermesturm		88.8 m (291 ft)		1958	The viewing platform of the Hermes Tower is located at a height of 65 m (213 ft).
3	Verwaltungsgebäude der Nord/LB		83.52 m (274 ft)	18	2002	Headquarters of Norddeutsche Landesbank
4	Verwaltungsgebäude Nord der Deutschen Messe		82 m (269 ft)	20	2000	Seat of Deutsche Messe AG, Height to tip 110 m (361 ft).
5	Nobelring 44		74.8 m (245 ft)	20	1971	Residential
6	Ihmepassage 2		73 m (240 ft)	20	1975	Residential, Part of Ihme-Zentrum.
7	Sparkasse Hannover		69.5 m (228 ft)	17	1977	Seat of Sparkasse Hannover
8	Hochhaus Appelstraße		69.4 m (228 ft)	18	1972	Multipurpose building of Leibniz University Hanover
9	Ihmeplatz 1		68 m (223 ft)	21	1974	Residential, Part of Ihme-Zentrum
10	Allianz-Hochhaus		67.5 m (221 ft)	16	1971	Seat of Allianz
11	Elmstraße 17		67.3 m (221 ft)	18		Residential
12	Continental-Hochhaus		65 m (213 ft)	15	1953	Former administration building of Continental AG, today building of Leibniz University Hanover
13	Helstorfer Straße 25		63.6 m (209 ft)	17		Residential
13	R+V Versicherung		63.6 m (209 ft)	17	1996	Seat of R+V Versicherung
13	Vahrenheider Markt 8		63.6 m (209 ft)	17	1970	Residential
16	Congress Hotel am Stadtpark		56 m (184 ft)	19	1974	Hotel
17	IntercityHotel Hannover Hauptbahnhof Ost		54 m (177 ft)	15	2019	Hotel
18	Anzeiger-Hochhaus		51 m (167 ft)	12	1928	First high-rise building in Hanover and landmark at the Steintor
19	Ihme-Zentrum Apartment Komplex			18		Residential, Part of Ihme-Zentrum
19	Haus des Genossenschaftsverbands			15		Office
20	Hastra-Hochhaus			14		Office
21	Hamburger Allee 25			14		Fachbereich Soziales der Stadt Hannover

== See also ==
- List of tallest buildings in Germany
- List of tallest structures in Germany
