= List of shopping malls in Germany =

This article lists Germany's notable and largest shopping malls.

== Notable shopping malls ==
Following is a list of notable shopping malls in Germany.

Name	Location	State	Opened	Developer or owner	Note
Alexa Centre	Berlin	Berlin			
East Side Mall	Berlin	Berlin	2018		
Einkaufs-Center Neuperlach – pep	Munich	Bavaria	1981		
Europa-Center	Berlin	Berlin			
Fünf Höfe	Munich	Bavaria			
Höfe am Brühl	Leipzig	Saxony	2012	Unibail-Rodamco-Westfield German	
Hofstatt	Munich	Bavaria	2013	LBBW Immobilien	
Ihme-Zentrum	Hannover	Lower Saxony	1975		
Kaufingerstraße	Munich	Bavaria			
LP12 Mall of Berlin	Berlin	Berlin	2014	HGHI Holding	
Mall of Berlin	Berlin	Berlin	2014		
Mira	Munich	Bavaria	2008	Koprian iQ Management, GEPRO Wohn- und Gewerbebau GmbH & Co. Zwanzigste Immobilien KG (owner)	
MyZeil	Frankfurt am Main	Hessen	2009	PalaisQuartier (developer), RME (owner)	
Olympia-Einkaufszentrum	Munich	Bavaria	1972	ECE Projektmanagement	
Rathauspassagen	Berlin	Berlin		WBM Wohnungsbaugesellschaft Berlin-Mitte	
Schlosshöfe	Oldenburg	Lower Saxony			
Schwarzwald-Baar-Center	Villingen-Schwenningen	Baden-Württemberg	2000		
Skyline Plaza	Frankfurt	Hesse	2013		
Westfield Centro	Oberhausen	North Rhine-Westphalia	1996	Unibail-Rodamco-Westfield	
Zeilgalerie (closed)	Frankfurt	Hesse	1992		

== Largest shopping malls ==
This is a list of the largest shopping malls in Germany, starting with a minimum of 60,000 square metres (650,000 sq ft) of gross leasable area (GLA).

Rank	Name	Location	State	GLA (m^{2})	Opened	Developer or owner	Note
1	Westfield Centro	Oberhausen	North Rhine-Westphalia	119000	1996	Unibail-Rodamco-Westfield	
2	Ruhr-Park	Bochum	North Rhine-Westphalia	115000	1964 (2010)	Unibail-Rodamco-Westfield	
3	Chemnitz Center	Chemnitz	Saxony	107492	1992	CMC	
4	Gropius Passagen (de)	Berlin	Berlin	100000	1997 (2007)	Unibail-Rodamco-Westfield	
5	Main-Taunus-Zentrum (de)	Sulzbach (Taunus)	Hessen	91000	1964 (2011)	Deutsche EuroShop	
6	Nordwestzentrum (de)	Frankfurt am Main	Hessen	90000	1968		
7	Outletcity Metzingen	Metzingen	Baden-Württemberg	80000			
8	Rhein-Ruhr-Zentrum (de)	Mülheim an der Ruhr	North Rhine-Westphalia	79000	1973 (1998)	ECE	
9	MyZeil	Frankfurt am Main	Hessen	77000	2009	PalaisQuartier (devleoper), RME (owner)	
10	Bördepark (de)	Magdeburg	Saxony-Anhalt	77000	1994		
11	LP12 Mall of Berlin	Berlin	Berlin	76000	2014	HGHI Holding	
12	Boulevard Berlin (de)	Berlin	Berlin	76000	2012		
13	Nova Eventis	Günthersdorf	Saxony-Anhalt	75578	1991 (2006)		
14	Elbepark Dresden (de)	Dresden	Saxony	71650	1995	CMC	
15	Mutschler Center (closed)	Neu-Ulm	Bavaria	70000	1997		
16	Paunsdorf Center	Leipzig	Saxony	70000	1994	Unibail-Rodamco-Westfield	
17	Limbecker Platz	Essen	North Rhine-Westphalia	70000	2009		
18	Barkhof Passage	Hamburg	Hamburg	66000	1996 (2011)		
19	Weserpark	Bremen	Bremen	66000	1990 (2014)	ECE	
20	A10 Center (de)	Wildau	Brandenburg	66000	1996 (2011)		
21	Mall of Ku'damm	Berlin	Berlin	65000	2017		
22	Bodensee Center Friedrichshafen	Friedrichshafen	Baden-Württemberg	65000			
23	Porta Markt (de)	Porta Westfalica	North Rhine-Westphalia	62000	1965		
24	Florapark (de)	Magdeburg	Saxony-Anhalt	61877	1993	HBB	
25	Überseequartier	Hamburg	Hamburg	60000	2021	Unibail-Rodamco-Westfield	
26	Rhein-Neckar-Zentrum	Viernheim	Hessen	60000	1972	ECE	
27	Lloydpassage	Bremen	Bremen	60000	2003		
28	Linden Park	Hannover	Lower Saxony	60000	1975 (2008)		
29	Ihme-Zentrum	Hannover	Lower Saxony		1975		
30	Einkaufs-Center Neuperlach – pep	Munich	Bavaria	60000	1981		
