= Telemax =

Telemax may refer to:

- Telemax (tower), telecommunication tower in Hanover, Germany
- Telemax (TV network), Mexican broadcast television network
