= Degodehaus =

Historic house in Lower Saxony, Germany

Coordinates: 53.139093°N 8.21365°E

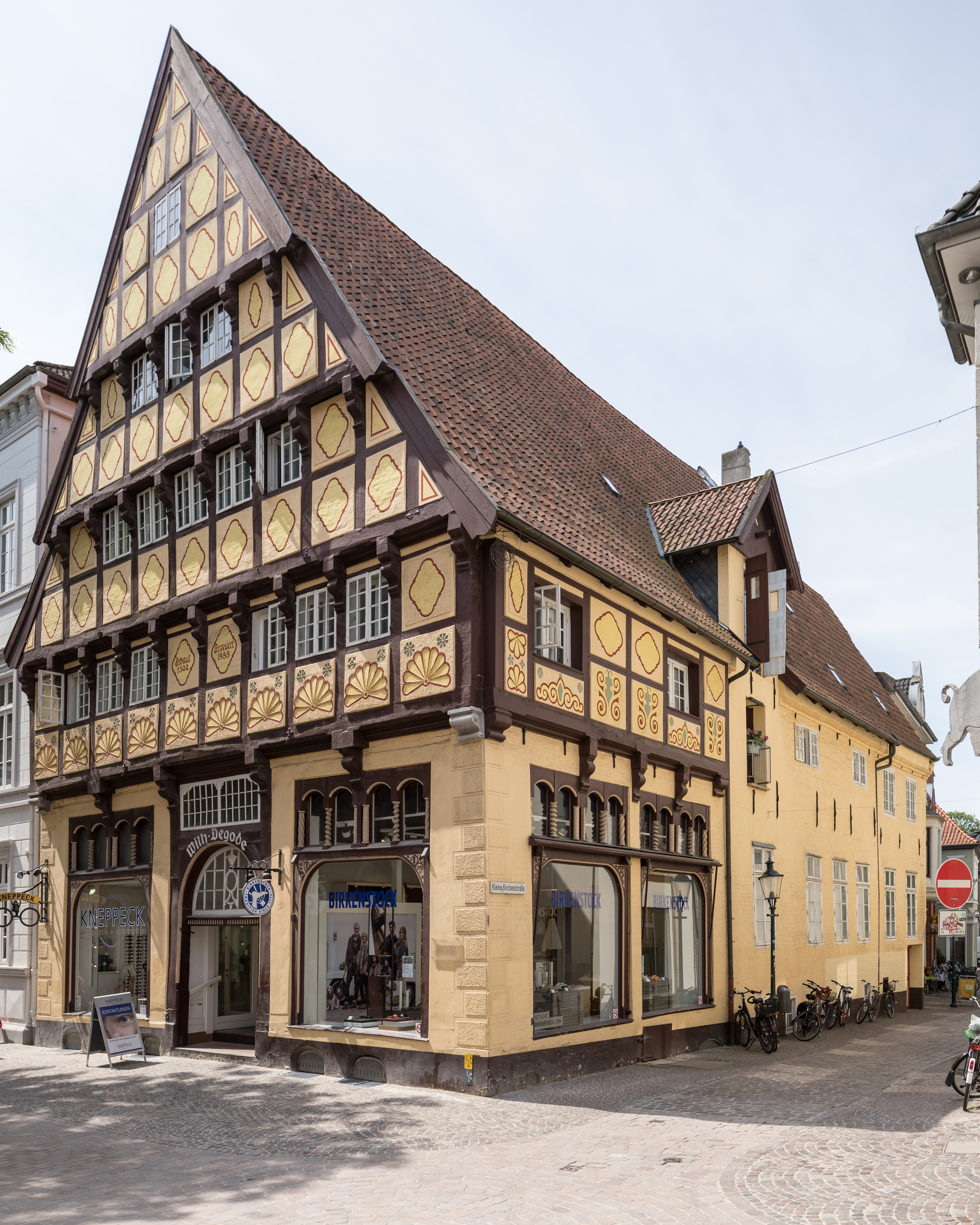
View of the house.

The Degodehaus (a.k.a. Haus "Degode" or "House Degode") is a historic house in central Oldenburg, Lower Saxony, Germany.

== History ==
The half-timbered building survived the great fire of 1676 in Oldenburg and is considered to be the last medieval patrician residence remaining in Oldenburg.

The typical late medieval house was built in 1502 by Christopher Stindt, as is evident from dating on a crossbeam of the front gable. It attained its present shape in 1617. Count Anton Günther (1603–1667) gave it to Mylius Gnadenfeld.

Mylius Gnadenfeld commissioned a painted wooden ceiling in 1645, including allegorical representations of the known continents: Europe, Asia, Africa, and the Americas, in the style of Dutch engravings. The painted ceiling was concealed by a new stucco ceiling in 1790, but the 39 square meter ceiling painting was rediscovered in 1992.

The house became used by a merchant in the 19th century. In 1860, Wilhelm Degode, also a merchant, acquired the house and since then it has borne his name. In 1862 his son, the painter Georg Wilhelm Degode, was born in the house.

The house is privately owned.

== Gallery ==
Allegorical ceiling painting dating from 1645:

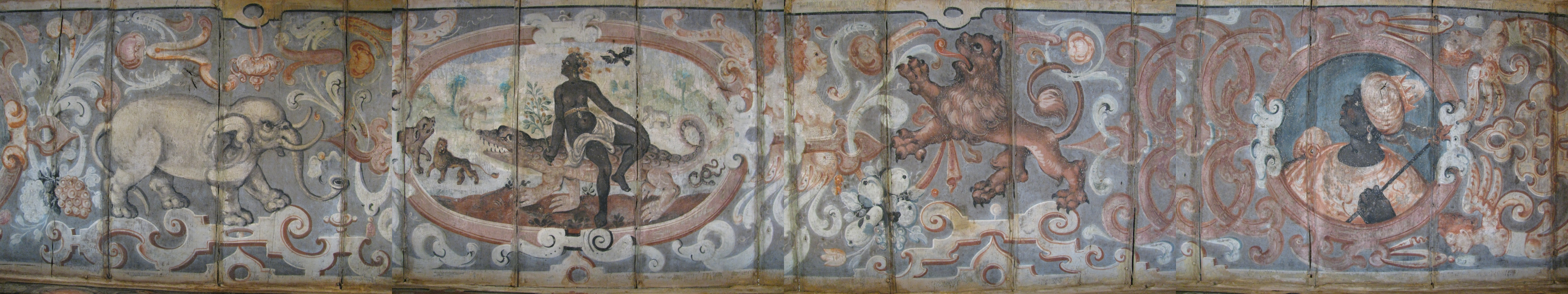
Depiction of Africa

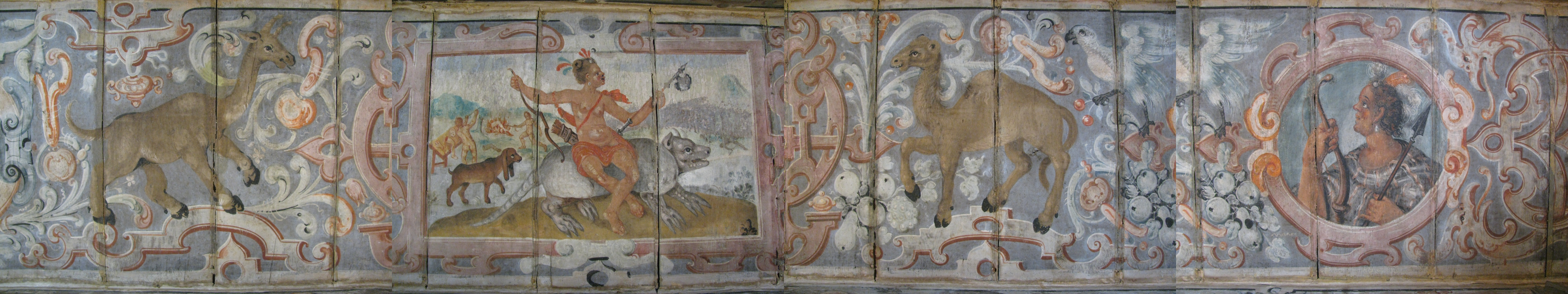
Depiction of America

== See also ==
- List of visitor attractions in Oldenburg
