= Edith-Russ-Haus =

Art gallery in the city of Oldenburg, Lower Saxony, Germany

Coordinates: 53°8′37.1″N 8°12′30.9″E

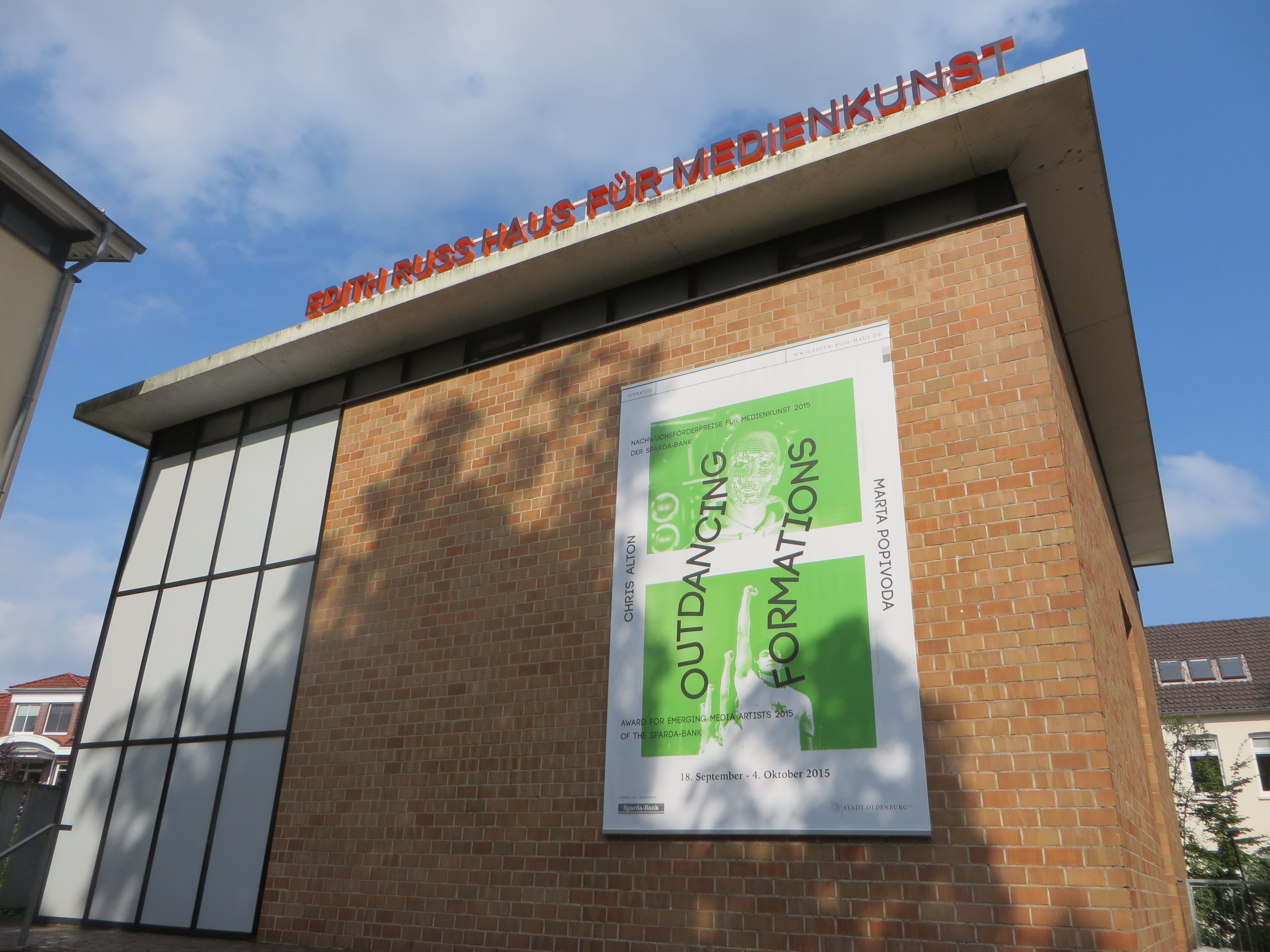
The Edith-Russ-Haus building.

The Edith-Russ-Haus für Medienkunst ("Edith Russ House") is an art gallery in the city of Oldenburg, Lower Saxony, Germany, dedicated to new media art.

The gallery was founded due to an endowment from Edith Russ, a secondary school teacher in Oldenburg. It does not have a permanent collection but presents temporary exhibitions and associated events. The building is close to the Peter-Friedrich-Ludwig-Hospital, a cultural centre and former hospital, located to the southwest.

== See also ==
- List of tourist attractions in Oldenburg
- New media
