= Haus "Graf Anton Günther" =

Historic house in Oldenburg, Germany

Coordinates: 53.1415°N 8.2131°E

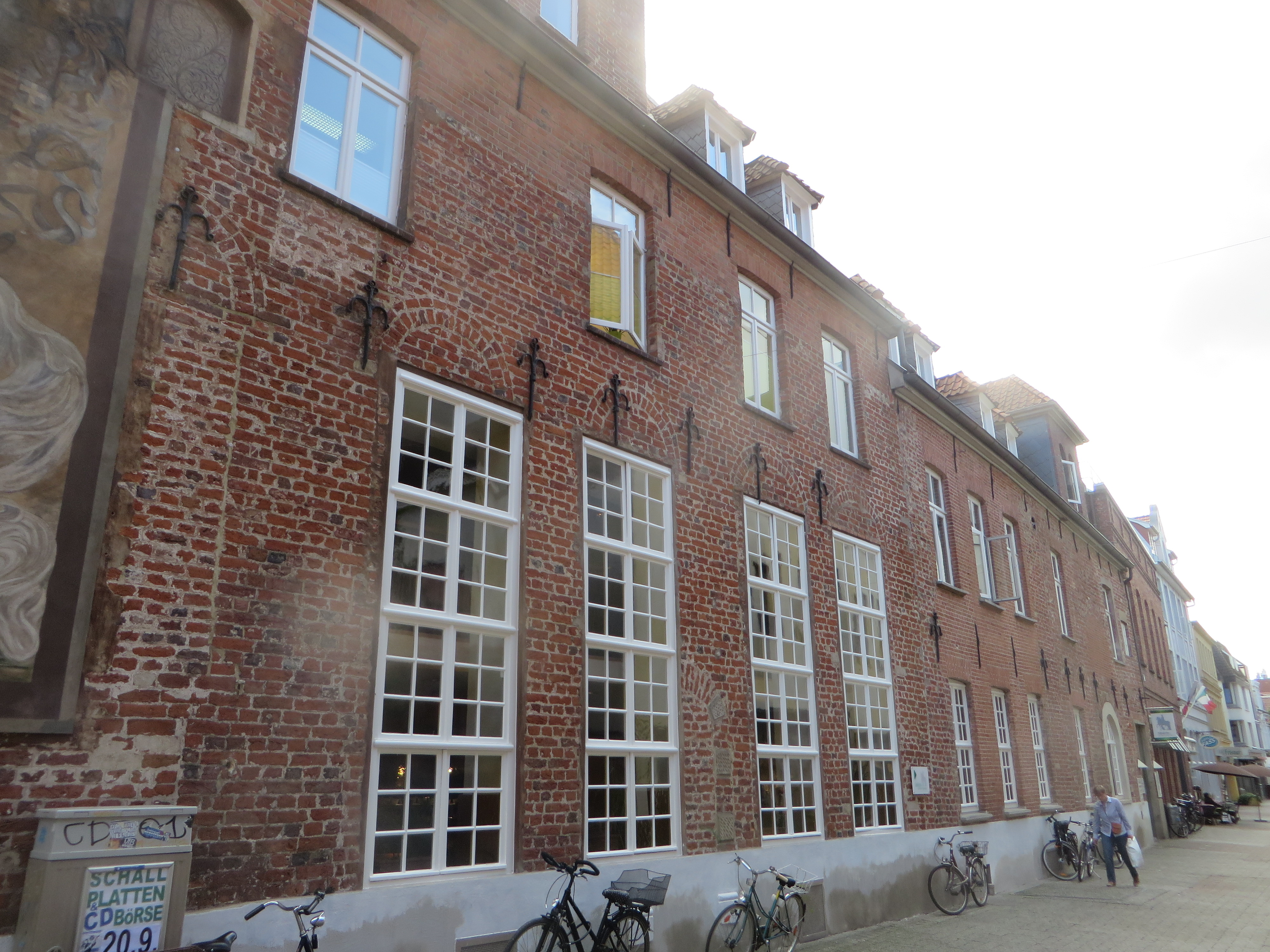
The Haus Graf Anton Günther historic building in Oldenburg

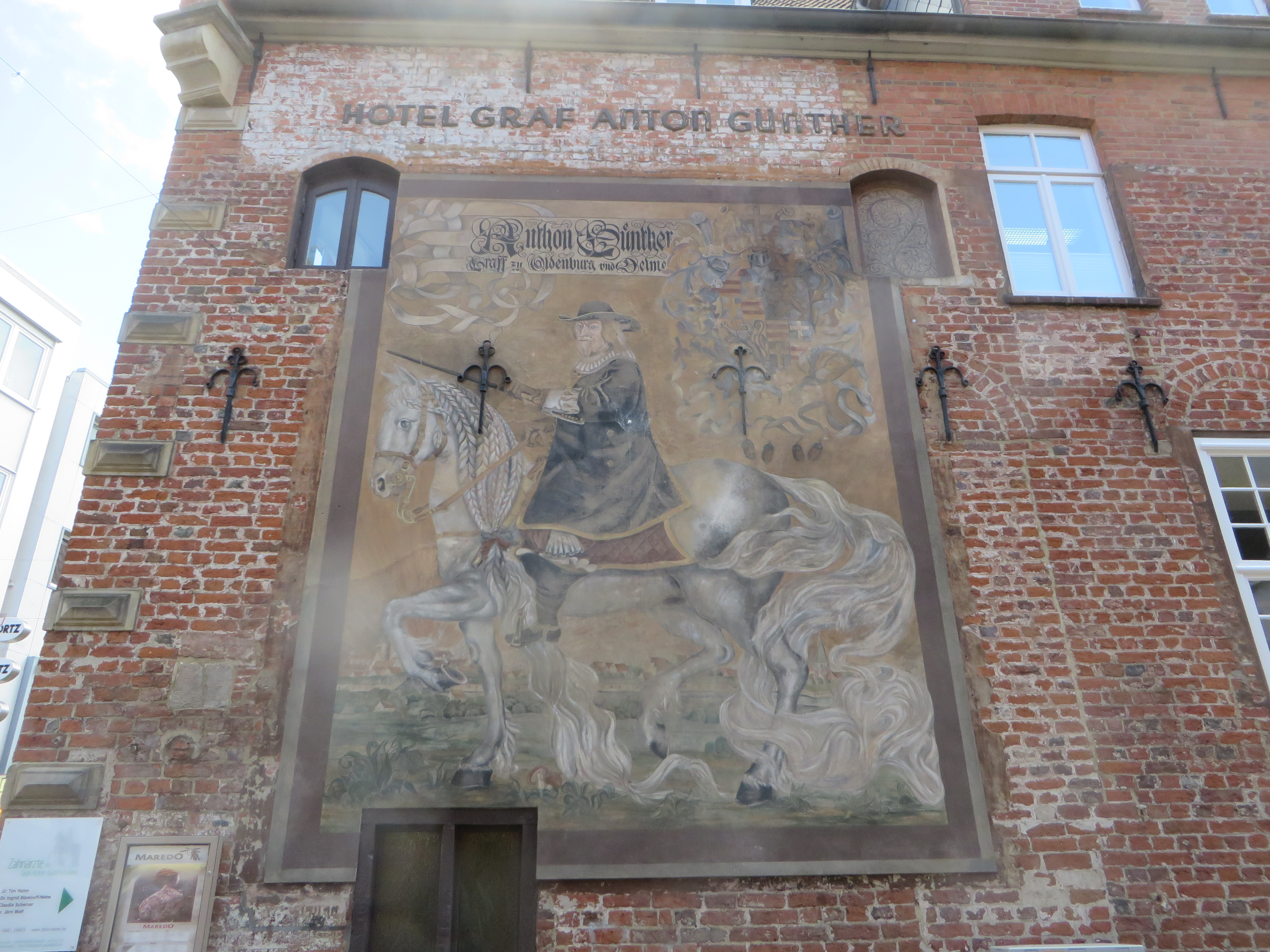
Mural on the outside of the Haus Graf Anton Günther building depicting Anthony Günther, Count of Oldenburg

The Haus "Graf Anton Günther" (a.k.a. Hotel Graf Anton Günther) is a historic house in central Oldenburg, Germany, dating from 1682.

Count Anton Günther is depicted riding a horse on the facade, which was redesigned in the neo-Renaissance style in 1894. The house was used by merchants and tobacco manufacturers.

After the great fire in Oldenburg, the building was constructed in 1682 as a merchant's house on the Lange Straße. For 135 years it belonged to the Grovermann family. In 1828, it was bought by Hinrich Lebrecht Kirchhoff. In 1838, the tobacco manufacturer Johann Karl Propping acquired the property. Propping built a tobacco factory designed by the architect Klingenberg. The house changed hands several times in the 1890s until it was bought by the Hoyer brewery. The house became a restaurant and hotel in 1894 and was named "Graf Anton Günther". Professor August Oetken created the large exterior fresco of Count Anton Günther on his horse, Kranich.

== See also ==
- List of visitor attractions in Oldenburg
