= Schlossplatz (Oldenburg) =

Main square in Oldenburg, Lower Saxony, Germany

Coordinates: 53.138°N 8.216°E

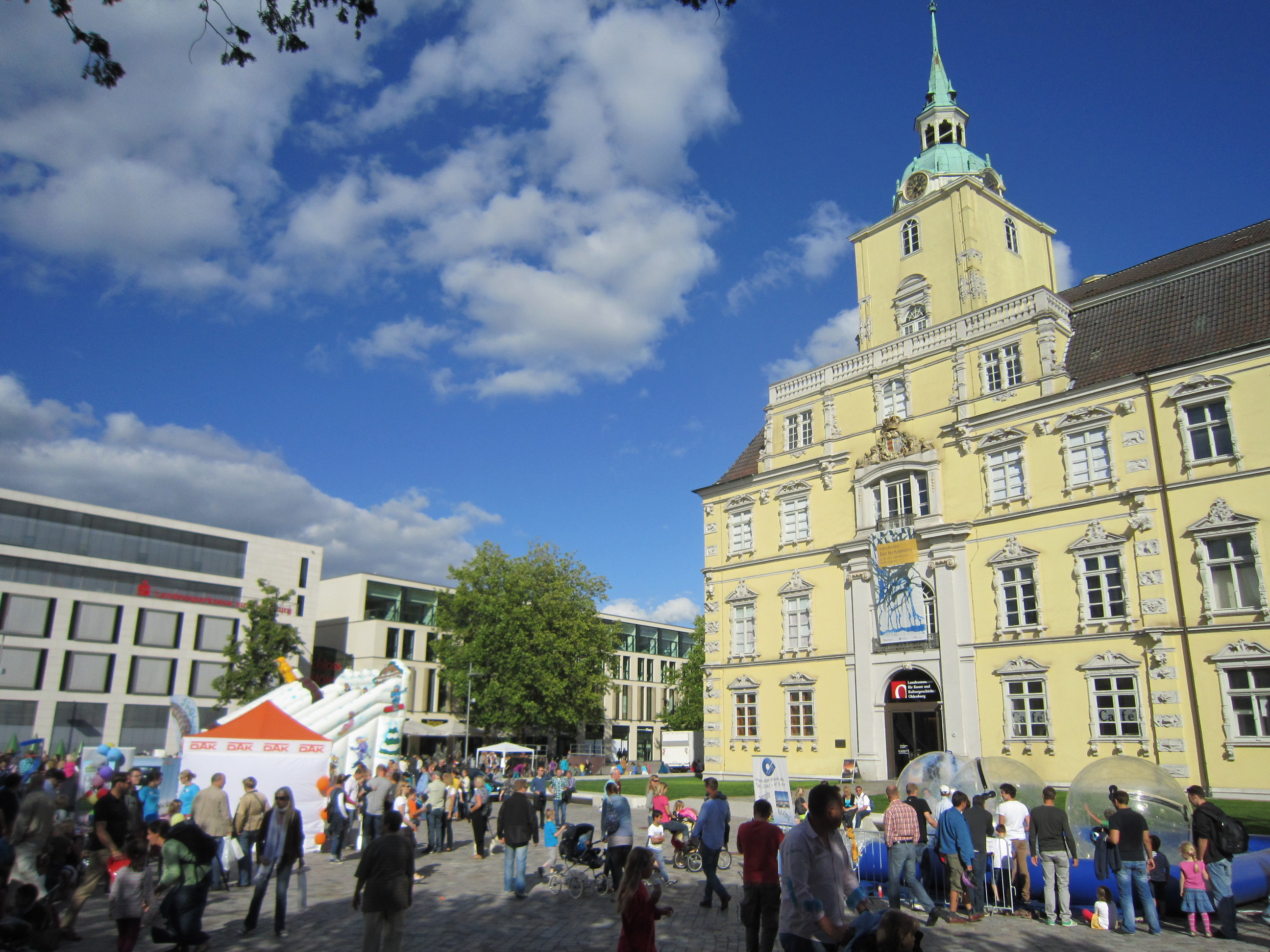
View of Schlossplatz, Oldenburg.

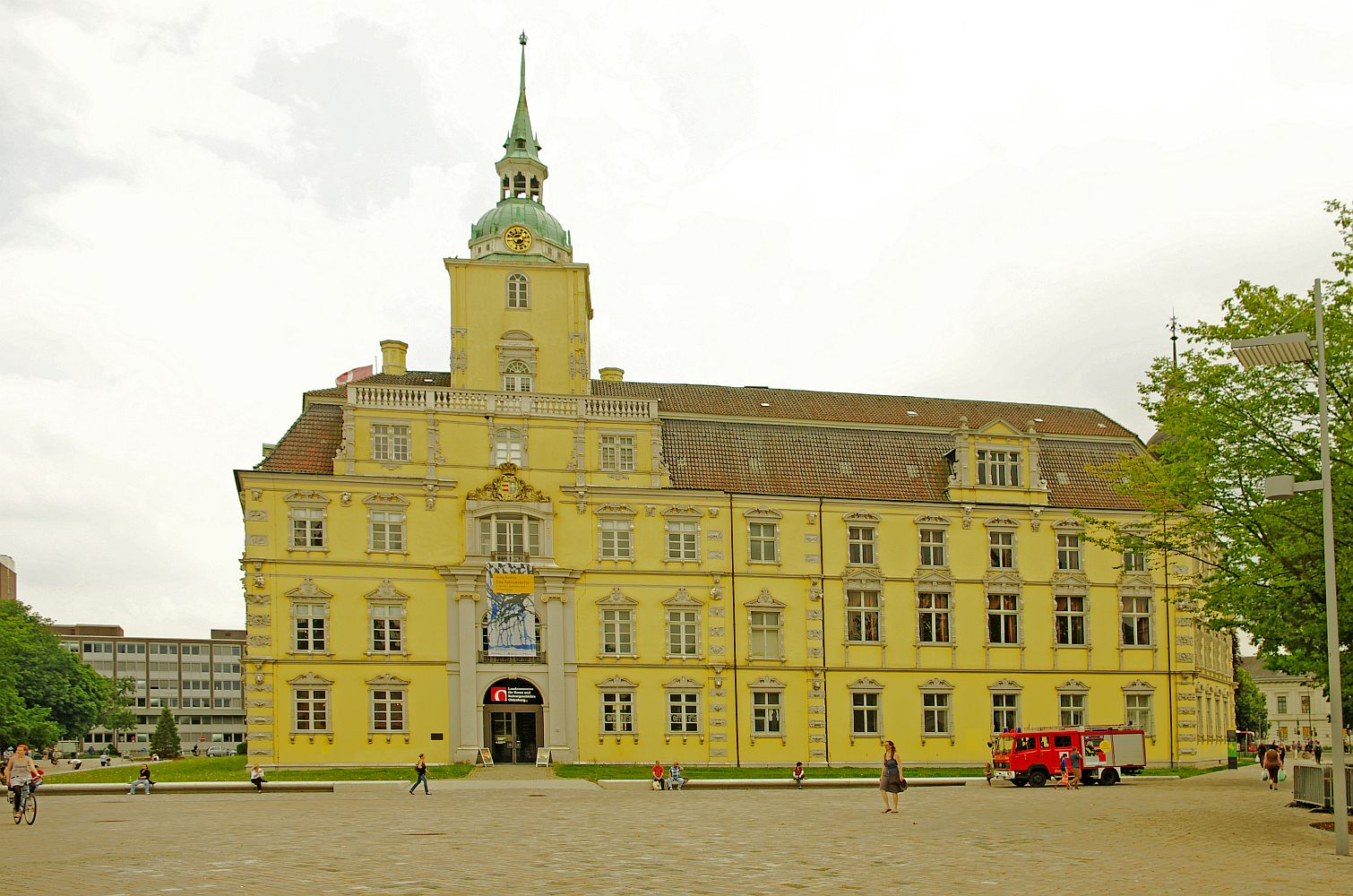
View of Schloss Oldenburg across Schlossplatz.

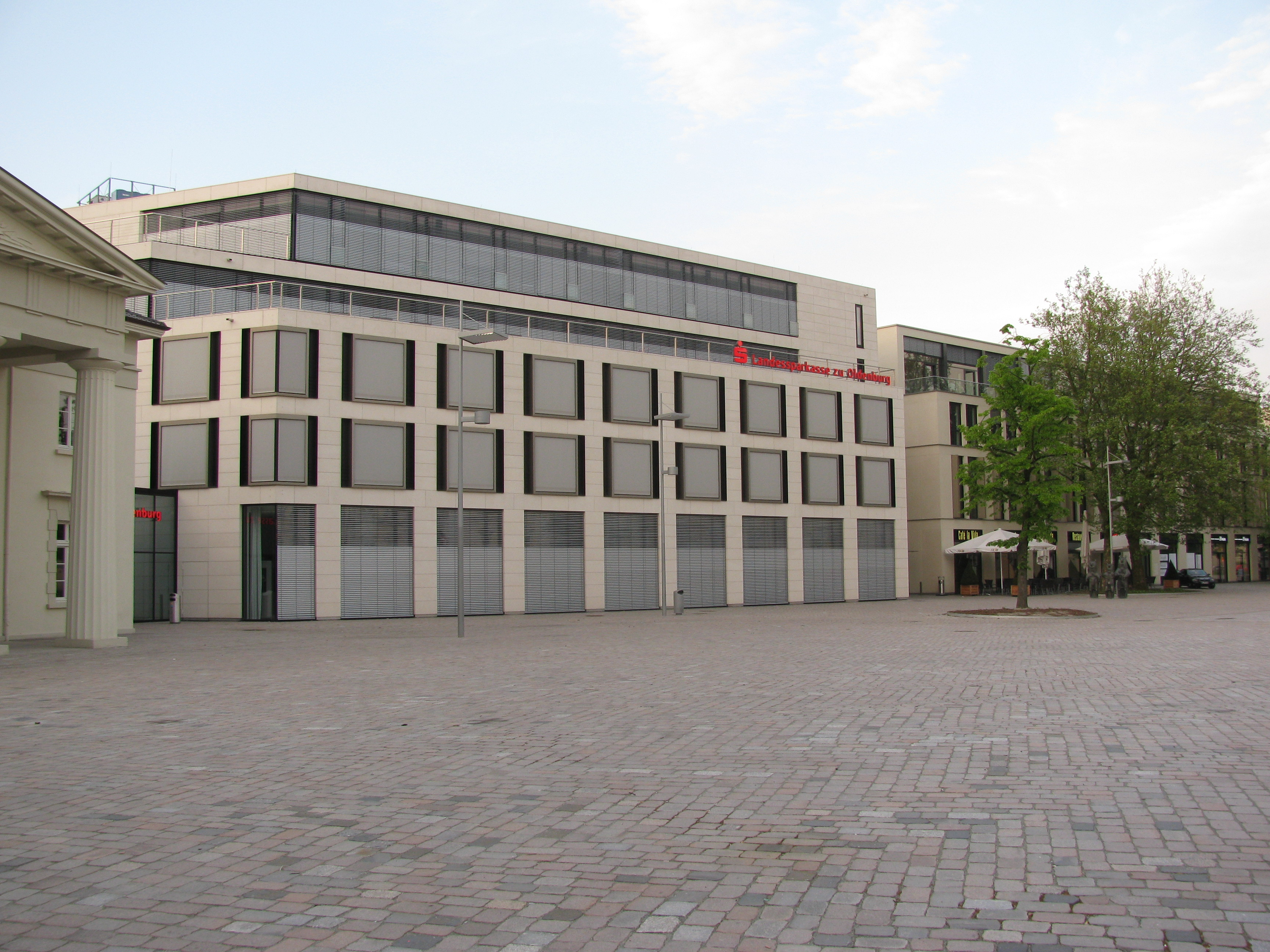
View of the Schlosshöfe shopping centre on Schlossplatz.

Schlossplatz (German pronunciation: [ˈʃlɔsˌplats]) is the main square in the city of Oldenburg, Lower Saxony, Germany.

The square is used for outdoor markets. To the southeast is Schloss Oldenburg. To the southwest is Schlossgarten Oldenburg. To the northwest is St Lamberti-Kirche. To the north is the Schlosshöfe shopping centre.

== See also ==
- List of visitor attractions in Oldenburg
