= Lappan =

Historic bell tower in Oldenburg, Lower Saxony, Germany

Coordinates: 53°08′35″N 8°12′48″E

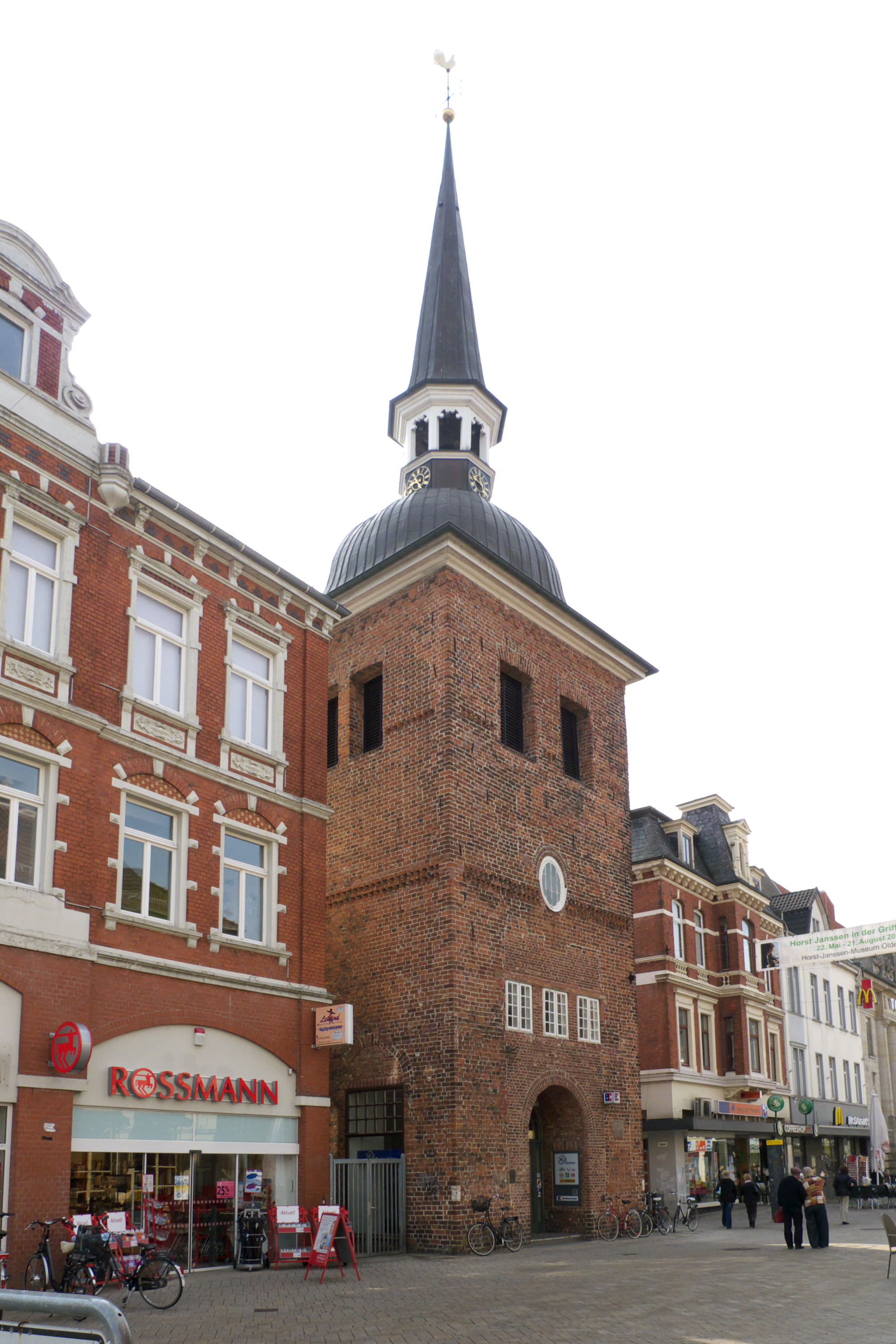
View of the Lappan tower from the northwest.

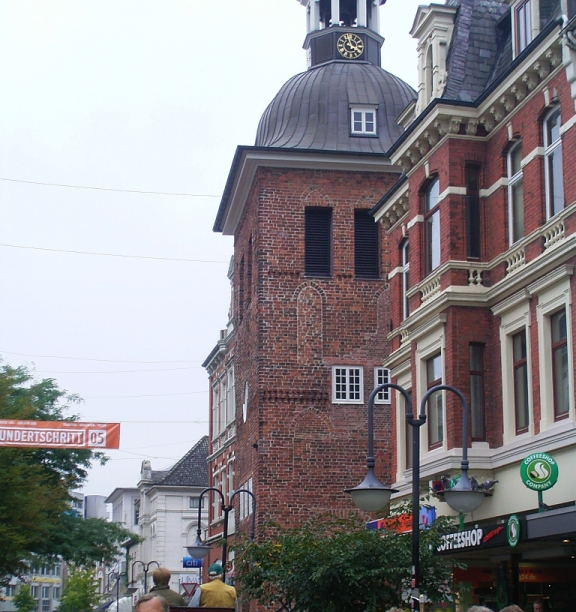
View of the Lappan tower from the south.

Lappan is a historic bell tower in the city of Oldenburg, Lower Saxony, Germany.

The tower is the oldest scheduled landmark in Oldenburg. It is 35m high with a Renaissance dome and survived the fire of 1676 in Oldenburg. The tower once belonged to the Holy Spirit Hospital. In 1709, the previous shingle roof was replaced by a copper dome.

== See also ==
- List of visitor attractions in Oldenburg
