= Schlosshöfe =

Coordinates: 53.1375°N 8.2171°E

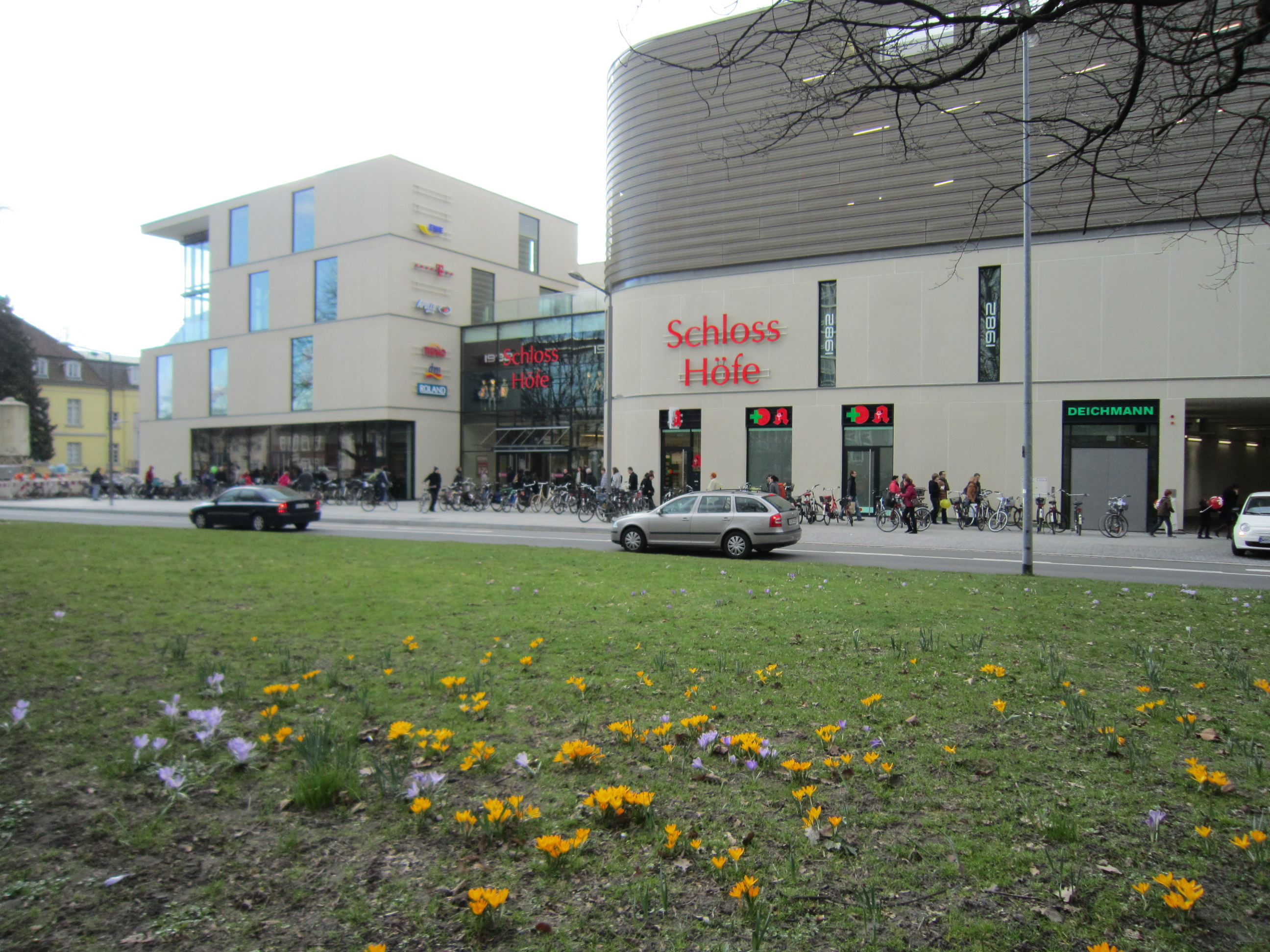
- Location: Oldenburg, Lower Saxony, Germany
- Num. of stores: 80
- Floor area: 12.500 m²
- Parking: 430
- Website: www.schlosshoefe-oldenburg.de

Schlosshöfe is a shopping mall in the centre of the city of Oldenburg, Lower Saxony, Germany.

The shopping mall is 12,500m^{2} in area and opened in 2011. Schlosshöfe is located to the north of Schlossplatz. To the south is Schloss Oldenburg and to the west is St Lamberti-Kirche. The owner of the Schlosshöfe is ECE Projektmanagement GmbH. The company invested 115 million euros in the project. The sales area is around 12,500 square meters. The center has 80 stores and a total of 450 employees. The total catchment area has 809,455 inhabitants.

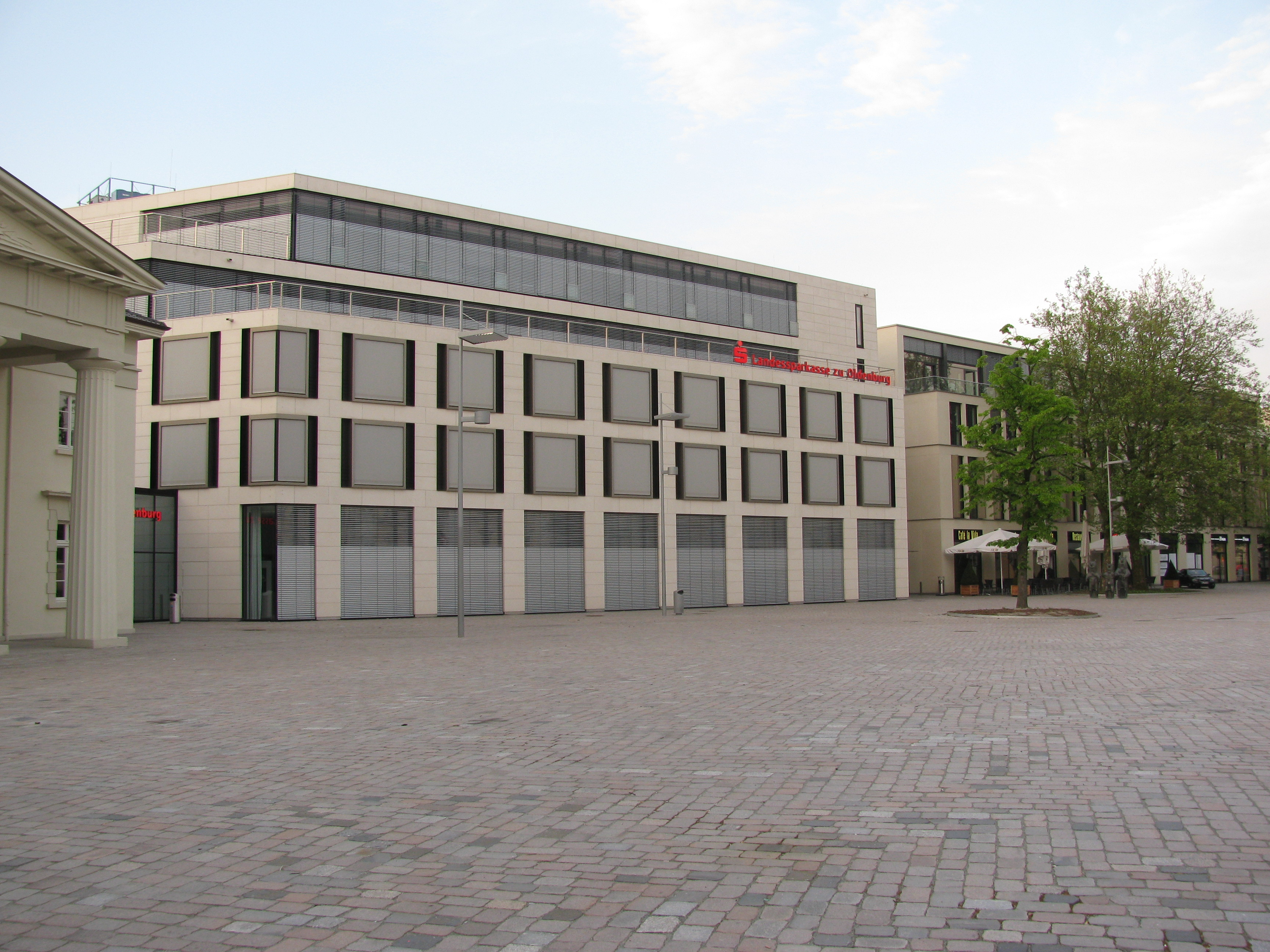
View of the Schlosshöfe shopping mall building from Schlossplatz.

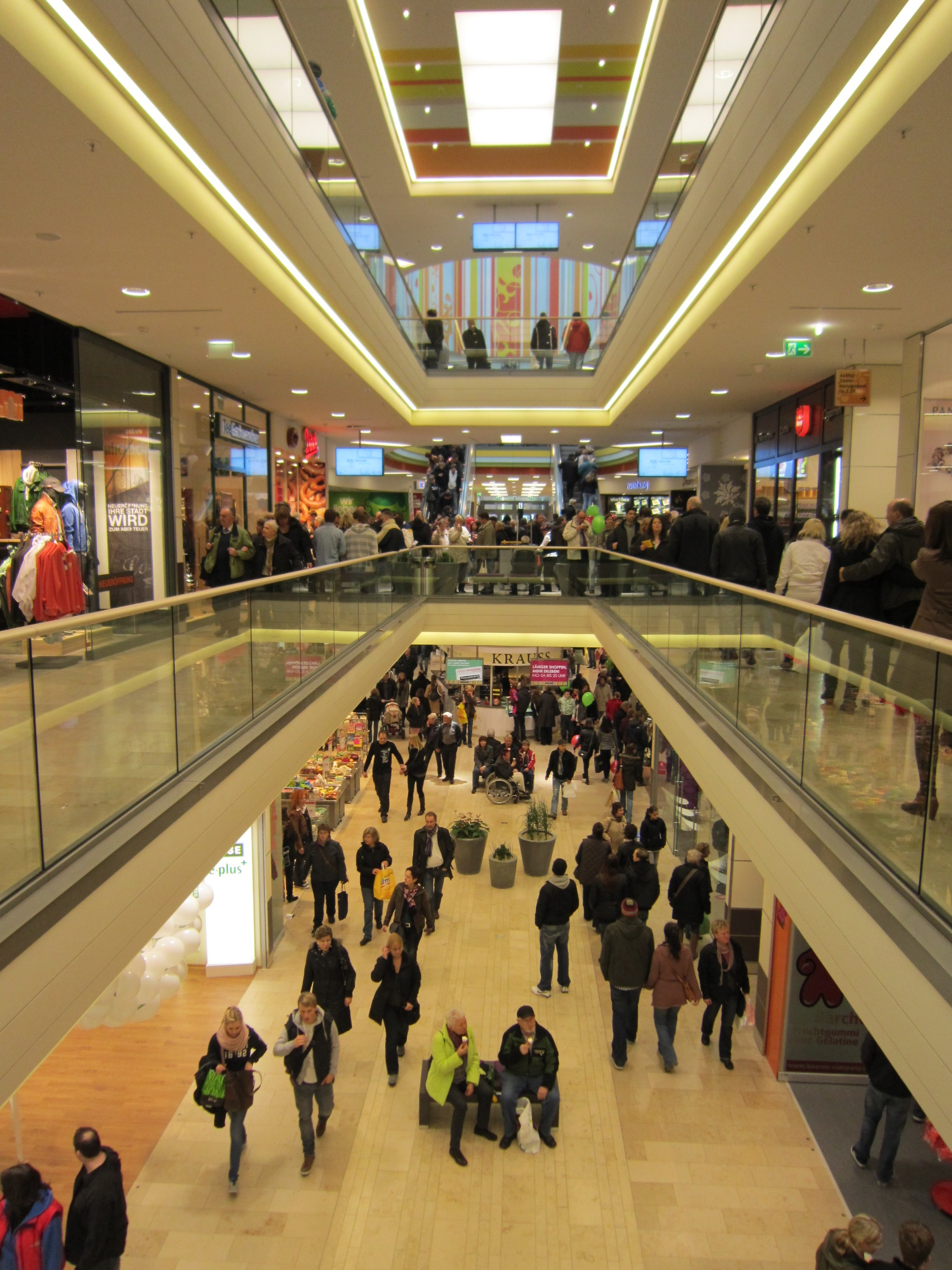
Internal view in Schlosshöfe.

== See also ==
- List of shopping malls in Germany
- List of visitor attractions in Oldenburg
