= Peter Friedrich Ludwig Hospital =

Former hospital in Oldenburg, Germany

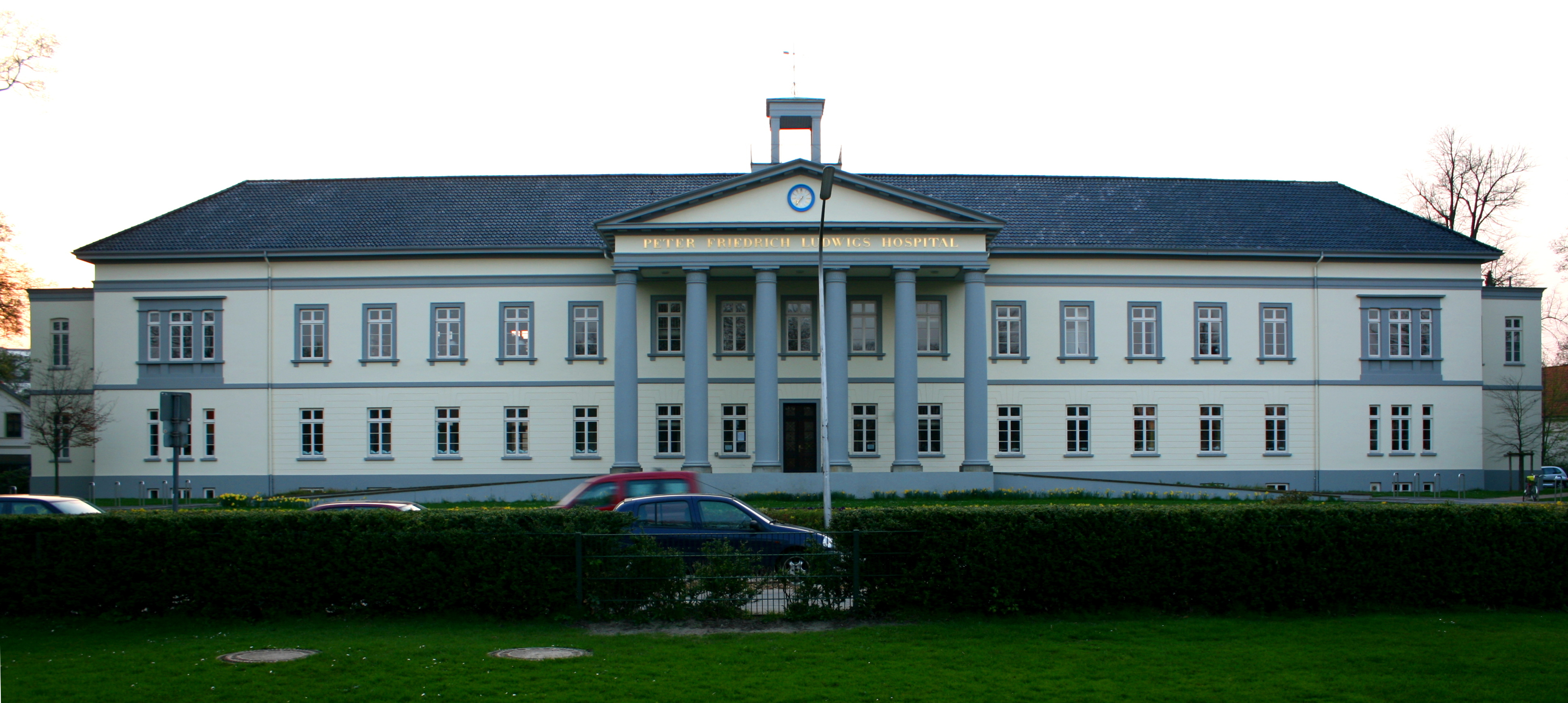
- Location: Oldenburg, Germany

The Peter Friedrich Ludwig Hospital (aka Kulturzentrum PFL) is cultural centre and former hospital in the city of Oldenburg, Lower Saxony, Germany.

The hospital was started in 1838 and the building was completed in 1841. It was named after Grand Duke Peter Friedrich Ludwig, who had a number of buildings erected in the Classicistic style during his reign. SInce 1984, the building has been used as a cultural centre with a library and cultural events.

To the northeast is the Edith-Russ-Haus a new media art gallery.

== See also ==
- List of visitor attractions in Oldenburg
- Peter Friedrich Ludwig
