= East Side Mall =

Shopping mall in Berlin, Germany

Coordinates: 52.505844°N 13.427441°E

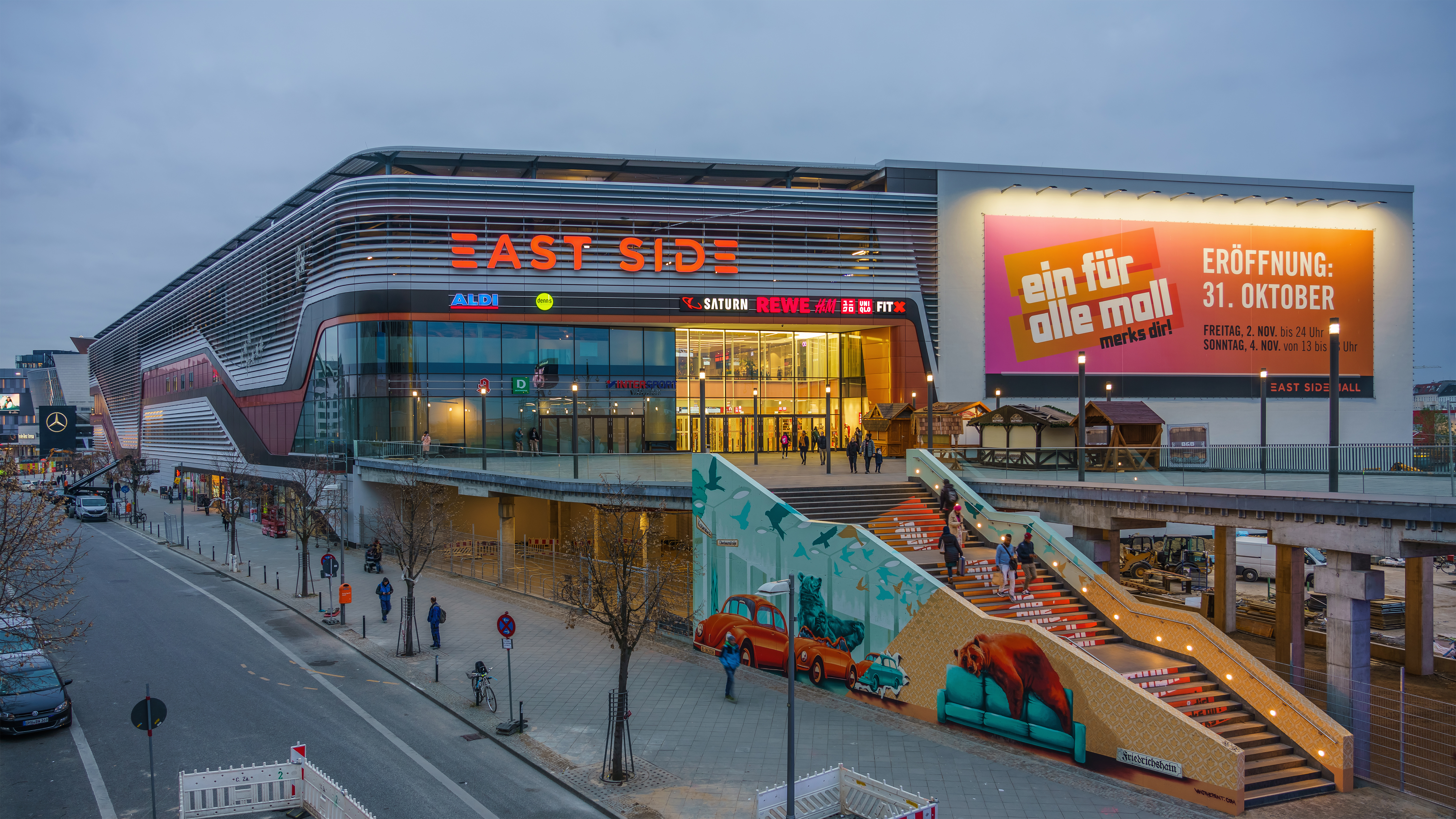
Mall exterior, 2018

The East Side Mall is a shopping mall in the Berlin-Friedrichshain district of Berlin, Germany. The mall was designed by architect Ben van Berkel. Construction began in May 2016 and it was opened to the public in October 2018.

== See also ==
- List of shopping malls in Germany
