= Mall of Berlin =

Shopping mall in Berlin, Germany

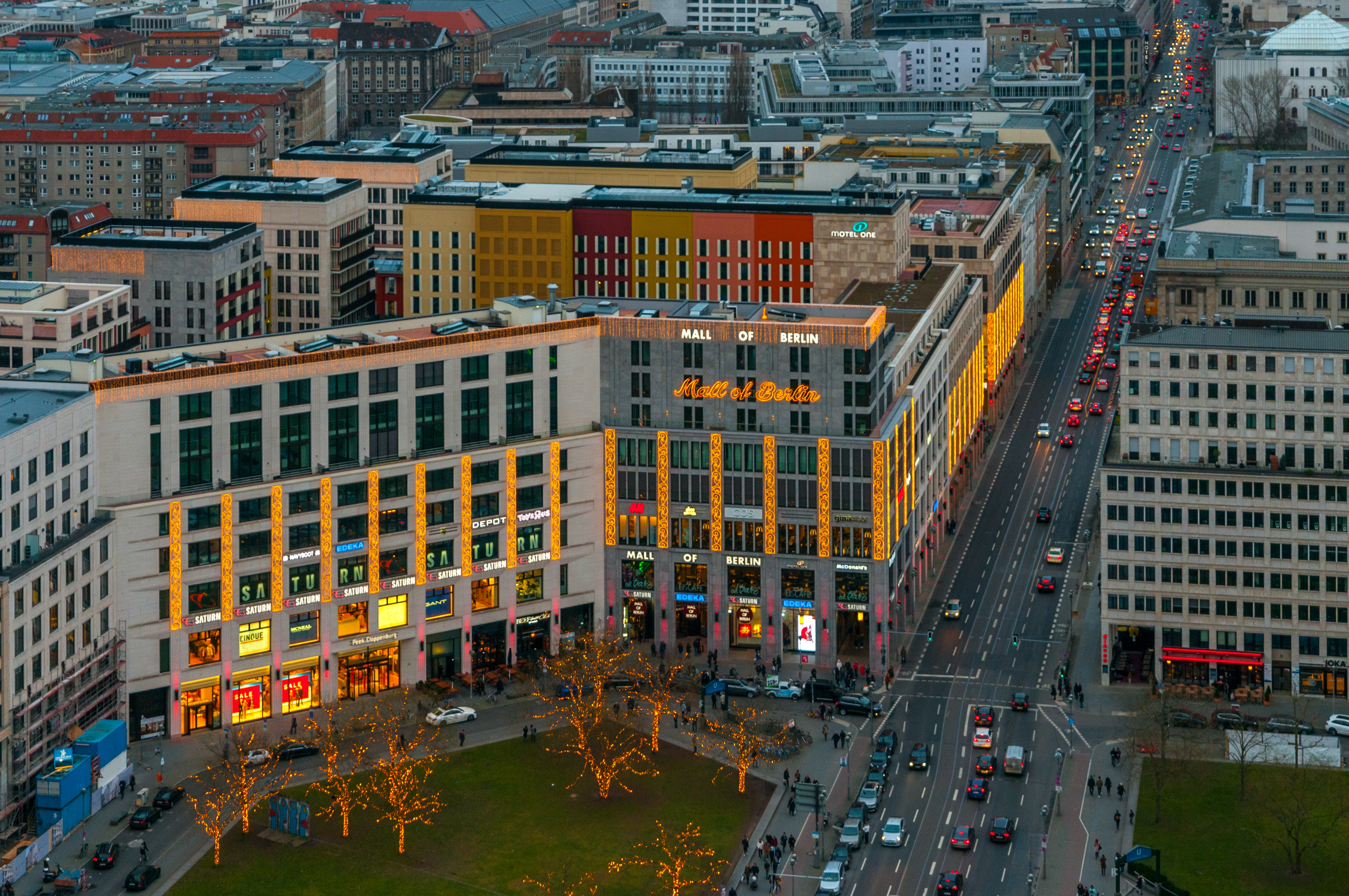
- Mall of Berlin, 2018
- Location: Berlin
- Coordinates: 52.5100°N 13.3798°E
- Opened: September 25, 2014
- Owner: High Gain House Investments
- Architect: Architektengemeinschaft Pechtold Ges. von Architekten mbH, nps tchoban voss GmbH
- Num. of stores: 200
- Website: mallofberlin.de

The Mall of Berlin is a shopping centre at Leipziger Platz in the Mitte locality of Berlin, Germany. Opened in September 2014, it has approximately 76,000 square metres of retail space and forms part of a mixed-use complex that also include offices and apartments. The complex occupies the former site of the Wertheim department store.

== History ==
The site of the mall was originally home to the Wertheim department store, which was the largest department store in Europe until it was destroyed in World War II. Since the location was very close to the sector boundary defined by the Potsdam Agreement, the entire Leipziger Platz remained undeveloped for the following four decades. From 1991 to 2005, the surviving underground vaults of the former department store housed the Tresor techno club. In 2005, the ruins of the former Wertheim store were demolished, making way for redevelopment.

Construction on the mall began in February 2011. In the spring of 2012, soil on the construction site collapsed near the tunnel of the U2 subway line below. Subway traffic was interrupted for several months for safety reasons. Construction reached the topping-out stage in August 2013, a year after the foundation stone was laid. After several delays, the mall opened on 25 September 2014.

A group of seven Buddy Bears, created in 2022 as part of the Hand in Hand for Tolerance project, was later installed in the Mall of Berlin, symbolizing tolerance, diversity and peaceful coexistence.

In 2024, the mall experienced increased vacancy as many ten-year leases dating from its opening came up for renewal. In July, Der Tagesspiegel counted 58 vacant retail units out of 275, with several further closures expected. HGHI subsequently repositioned the shopping centre, investing around €40 million. By February 2026, the specialist property publication Thomas Daily reported that the mall was close to full occupancy.

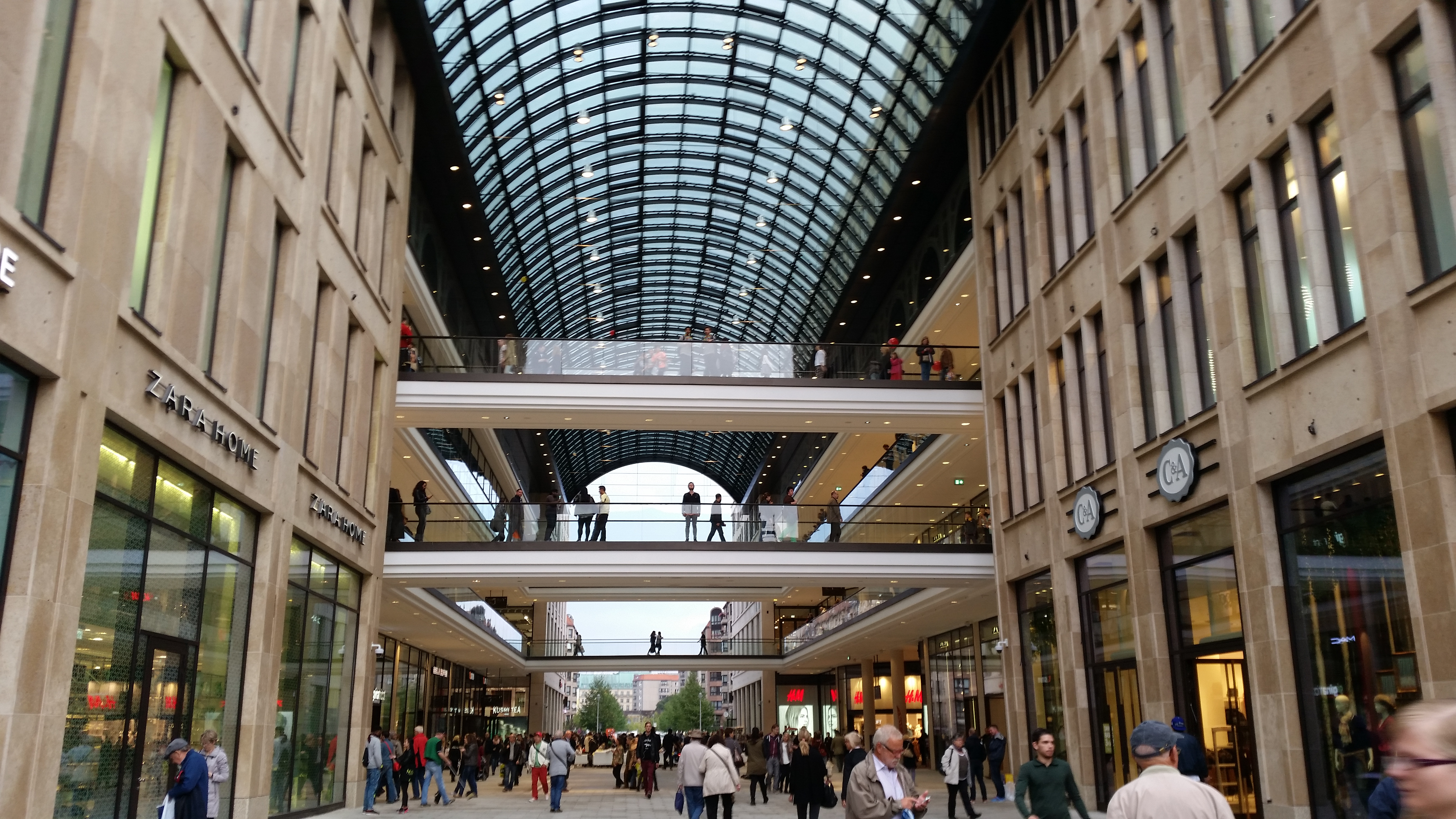
Mall of Berlin interior arcade, 2012

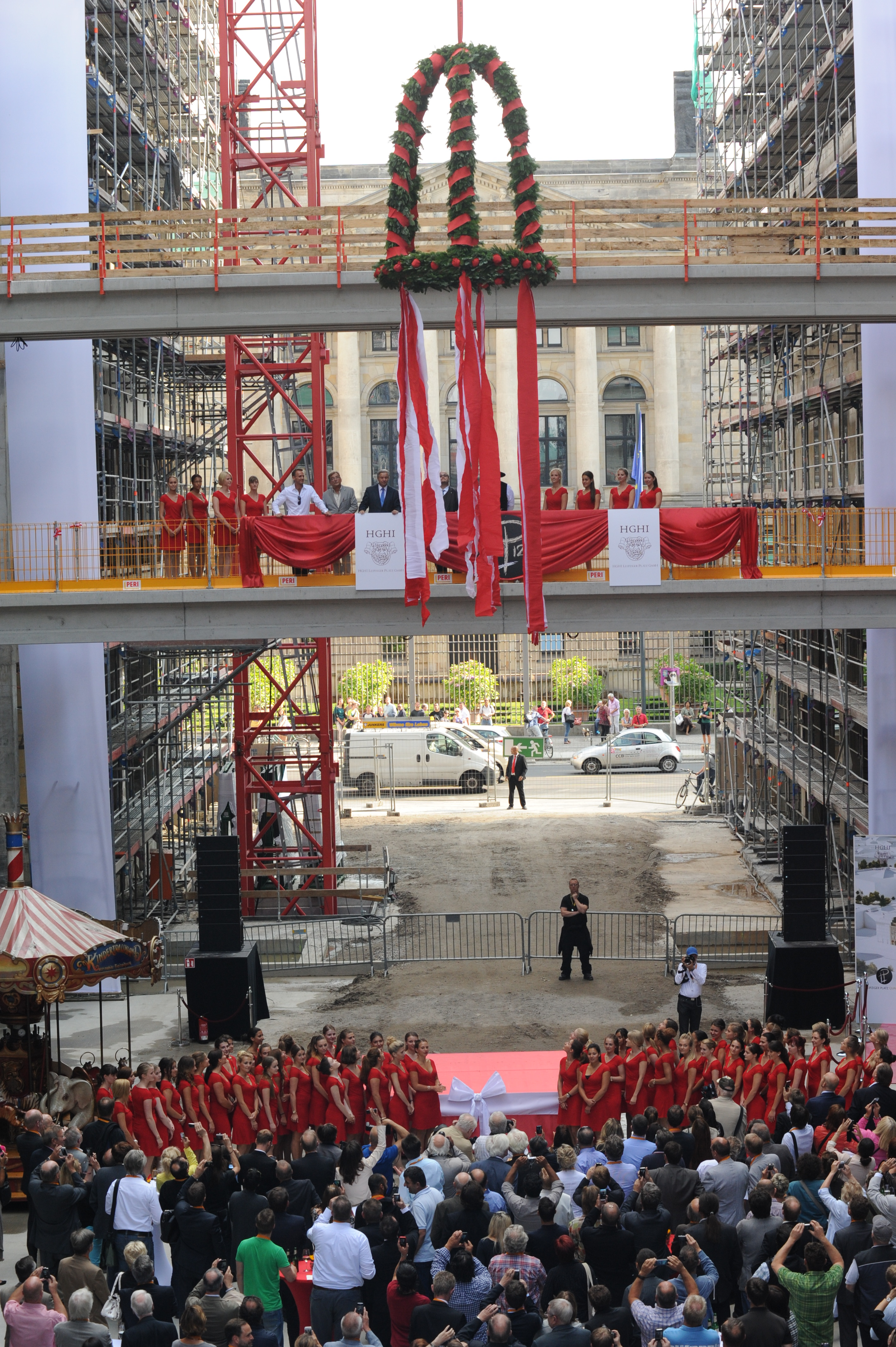
Topping out ceremony on August 15, 2013

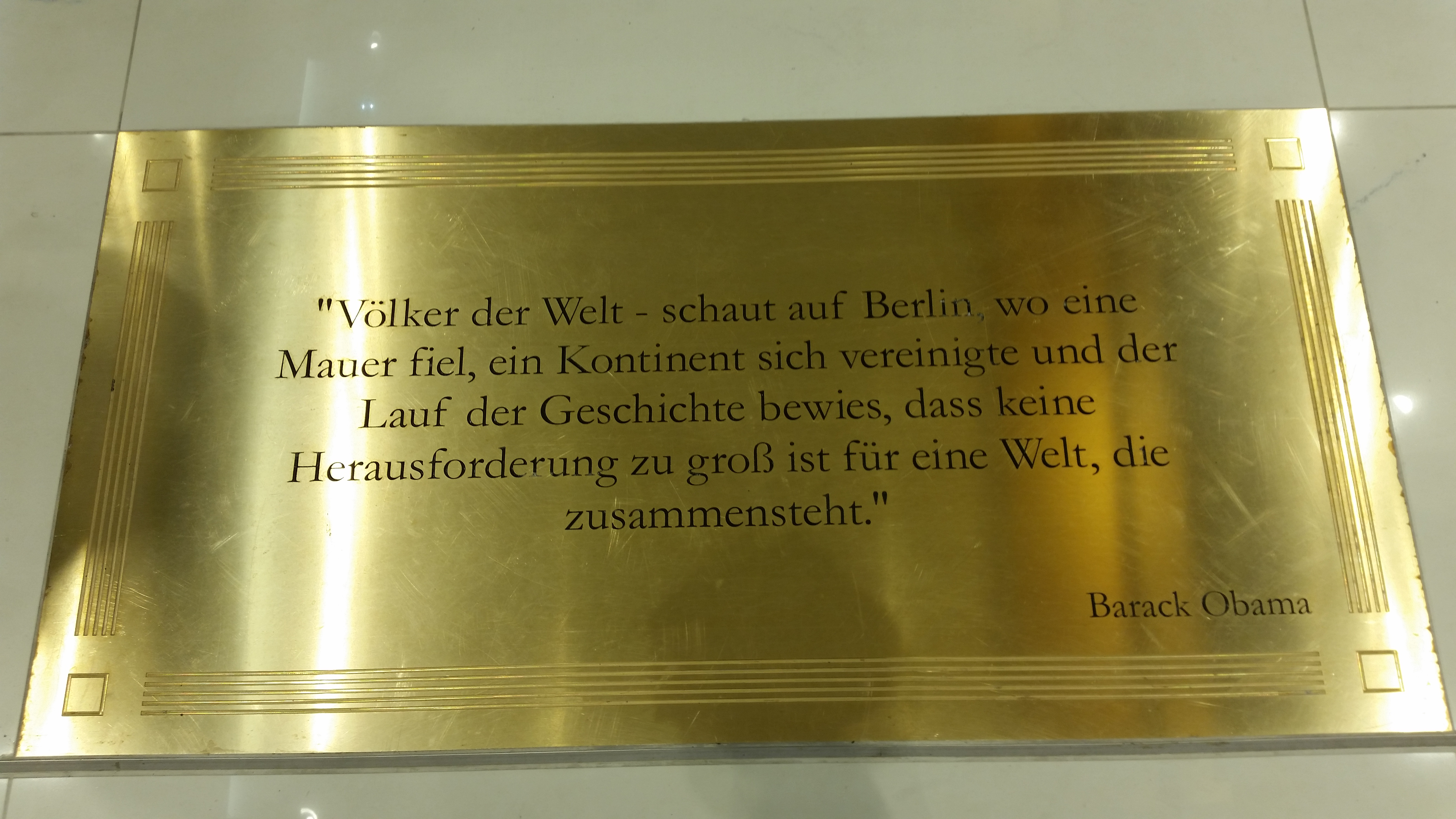
One of several brass plaques in front of the escalators with quotes from prominent people (here from Barack Obama)

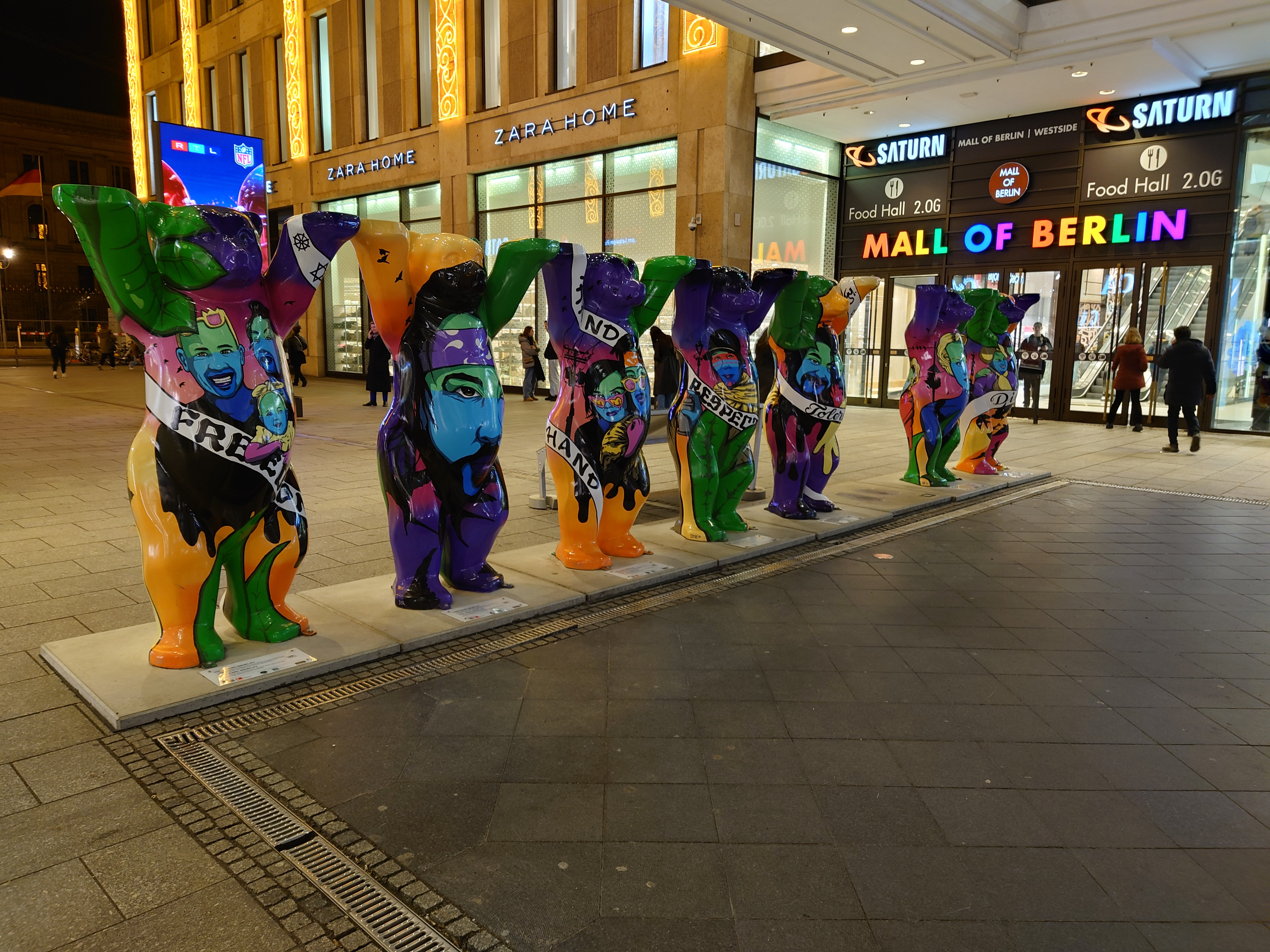
The seven Buddy Bears

== See also ==
- List of shopping malls in Germany
