= Old Town Hall (Oldenburg) =

- Altes Rathaus
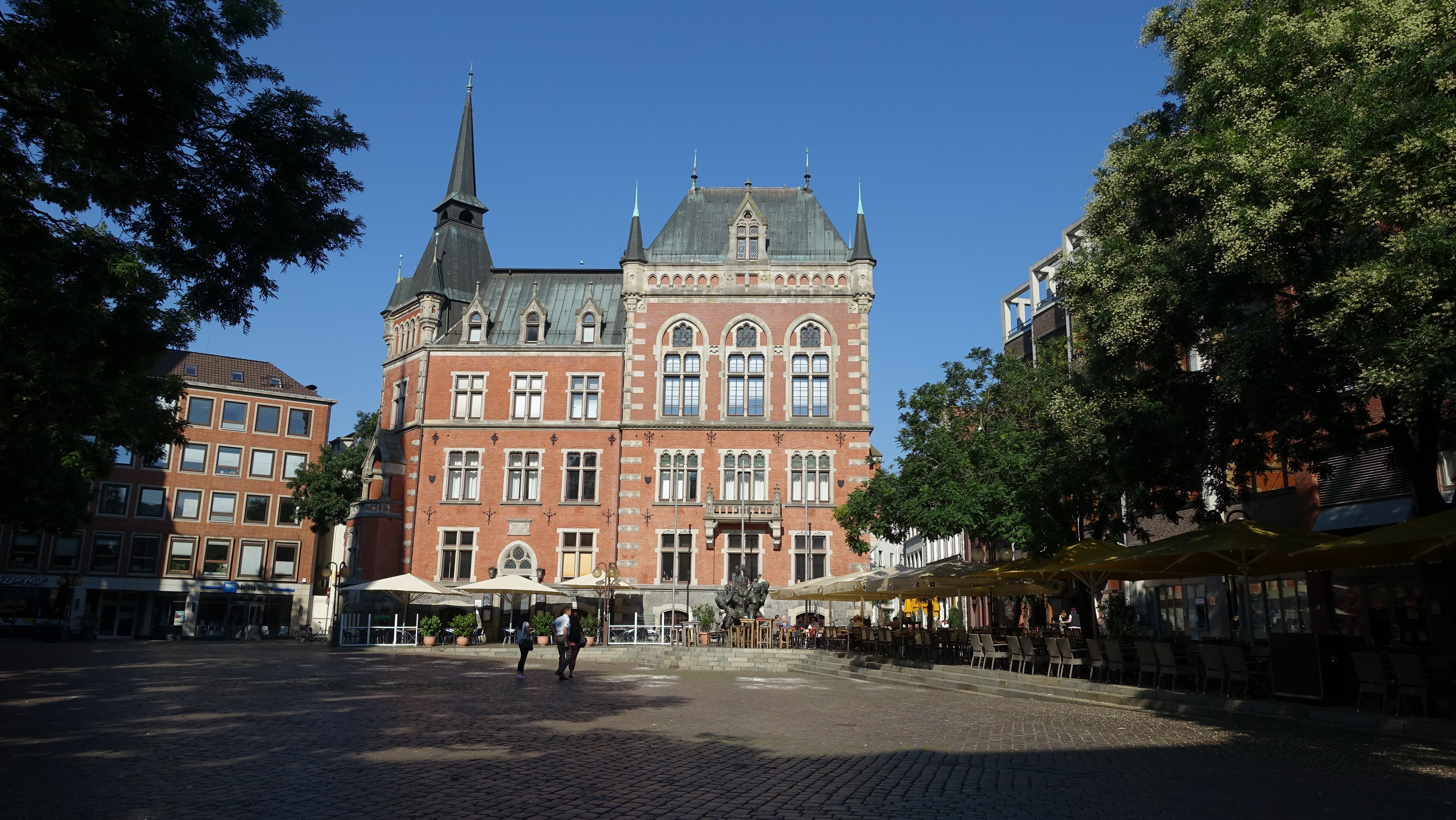
- View of the Old Town Hall in Oldenburg from the square to the east
- Interactive map of the Old Town Hall area

General information
- Type: Former town hall
- Architectural style: neo-Renaissance; neo-Gothic
- Location: Oldenburg, Lower Saxony, Germany
- Coordinates: 53°08′20″N 8°12′51″E
- Completed: 1888
- Demolished: 1886 (previous Renaissance building)
- Owner: City of Oldenburg

Other information
- Facilities: Ratskeller Oldenburg (restaurant)

The Old Town Hall (German: Altes Rathaus) is the former town hall in the centre of the city of Oldenburg, Lower Saxony, Germany.

In 1635, a Renaissance-style town hall was built on this site by Count Anthony Günther. It was removed in 1886 and the present building was completed in 1888 with elements of the neo-Renaissance and neo-Gothic styles. There is a German restaurant in the basement, the Ratskeller Oldenburg.

To the south is St Lamberti-Kirche and to the west is Oldenburgisches Staatstheater.

== See also ==
- List of visitor attractions in Oldenburg
