= List of tourist attractions in Oldenburg =

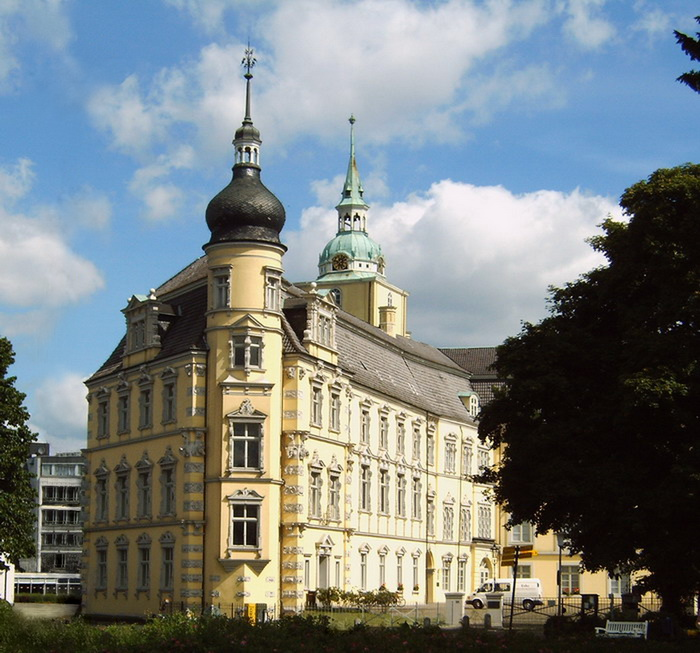
Schloss Oldenburg, housing part of the State Museum for Art and Cultural History

The following is a list of visitor attractions in Oldenburg, Lower Saxony, northern Germany.

== Tourist attractions ==
- Augusteum
- Bahnhofsgebäude
- Edith-Russ-Haus
- Elisabeth-Anna-Palais
- Haus "Degode"
- Haus "Graf Anton Günther"
- Horst-Janssen-Museum
- Landesmuseum für Kunst und Kulturgeschichte
- Landesmuseum für Natur und Mensch
- Lappan
- Oldenburger Computer-Museum
- Oldenburgisches Staatstheater
- Peter-Friedrich-Ludwig-Hospital
- Prinzenpalais
- Pulverturm
- Rathaus
- St Lamberti-Kirche
- Schloss Oldenburg
- Schlossgarten Oldenburg
- Schlosshöfe
- Schlossplatz
- Stadtmuseum Oldenburg

== Sports venues ==
- Large EWE Arena
- Marschweg-Stadion
- Small EWE Arena
- Weser-Ems Halle
