= Rathauspassagen =

Shopping center in Berlin, Germany

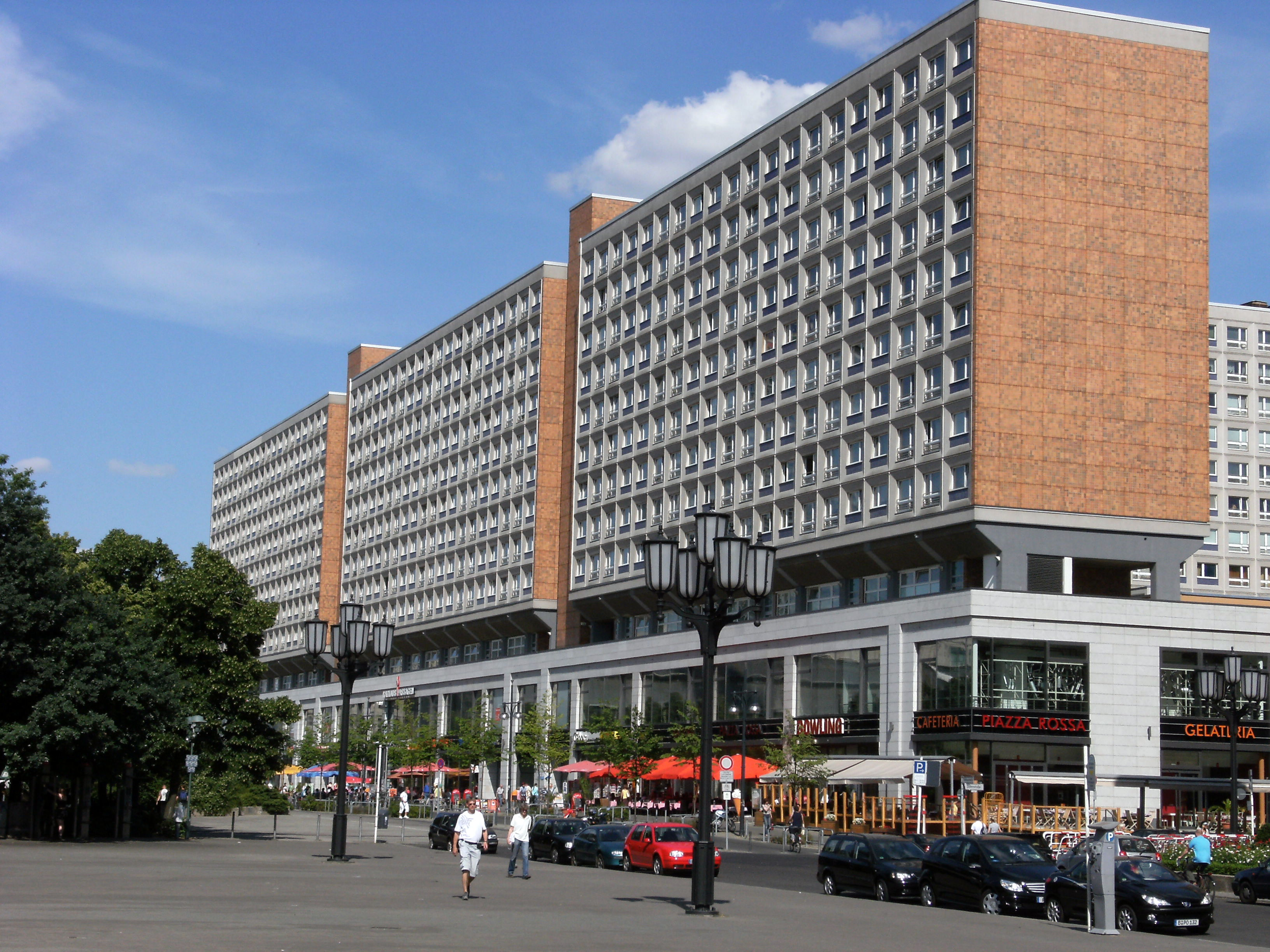
- Interactive map of the Rathauspassagen area

General information
- Status: Operational
- Type: Retail and Residential
- Location: Mitte, Berlin, Germany
- Coordinates: 52.520°N 13.409°E
- Current tenants: Various retail stores and residential tenants
- Year built: 1967–1972
- Owner: WBM Wohnungsbaugesellschaft Berlin-Mitte mbH

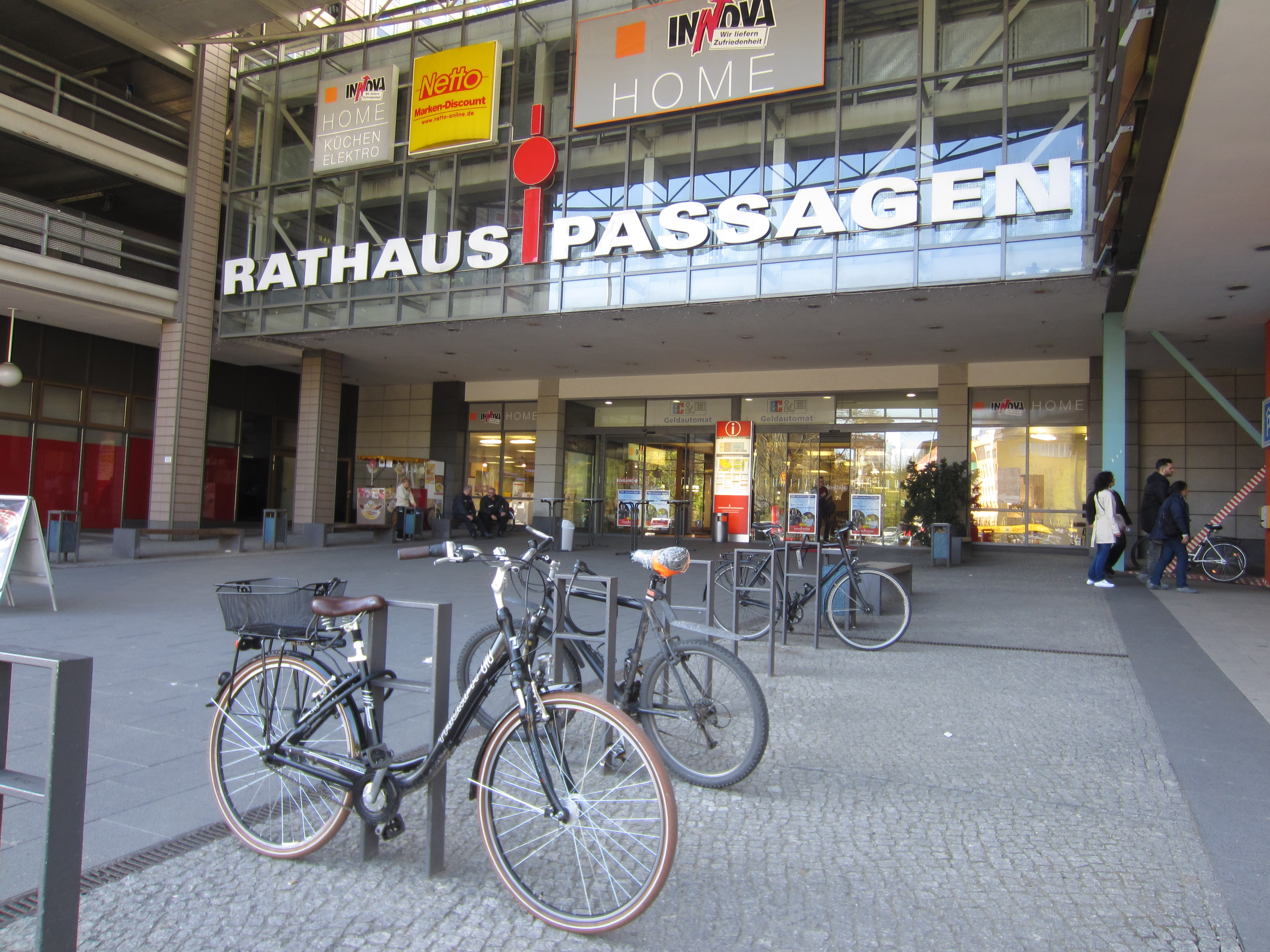
Entrance, 2016

Rathauspassagen is a shopping centre in Berlin, Germany.

The shopping centre forms the ground level of a mixed-use estate built in the 1960s and 1970s, located near Alexanderplatz and the TV Tower. It was originally designed as a flagship shopping centre, showcasing the strength of the East German economy to international visitors and locals alike.

Today, the Rathauspassagen and the apartment blocks sitting on top of the shopping centre are both managed by local authority-owned real estate company, WBM Wohnungsbaugesellschaft Berlin-Mitte mbH.

== See also ==
- List of shopping malls in Germany
