= Telemax (tower) =

Telecommunication tower in Hanover, Germany

- Telemax Fernmeldeturm
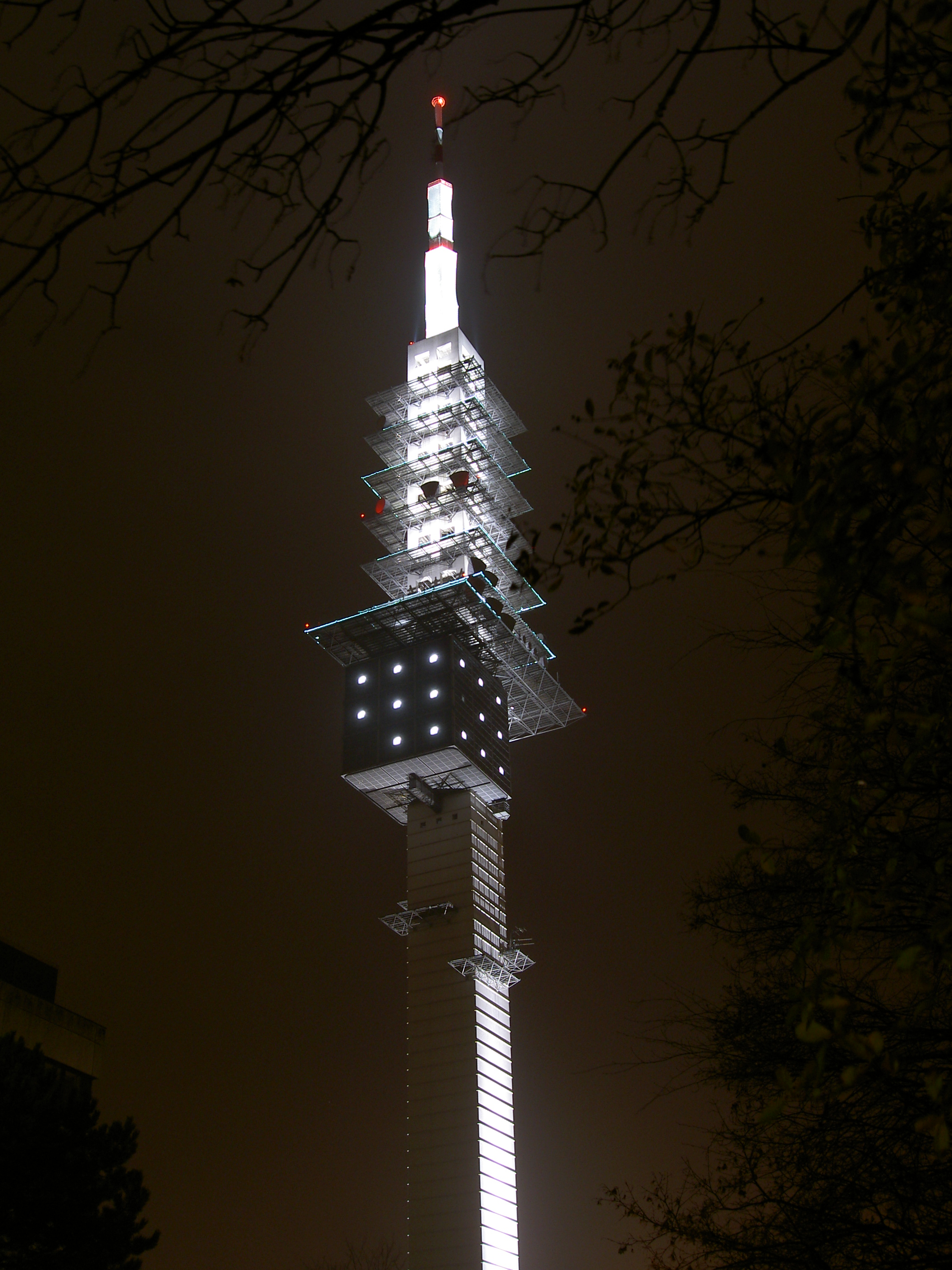
- Telemax Tower in Hanover, Germany

- Location within Germany

General information
- Status: Completed
- Type: Steel telecommunications tower
- Location: Hanover, Germany
- Coordinates: 52°23′35″N 9°47′59″E
- Construction started: 1988
- Completed: 1992
- Opening: 1992

Height
- Architectural: 282.0 m (925 ft)
- Antenna spire: 282.0 m (925 ft)

Design and construction
- Architect: Hans U. Böckler

The Telemax is a telecommunications tower built from 1988 to 1992 in Hanover. It was designed by Hans U. Böckler and is 282 metres (925 ft) high. The tower is the fifth-tallest telecommunications tower in Germany. The owner and operator of the site is Deutsche Funkturm, a subsidiary of Deutsche Telekom.

== Description ==
Originally a substantially slimmer round tower was planned. However, when the plans were submitted for approval, the inscription Model Hamburg was allegedly still written on the plan. It was decided that only a Model Hanover was appropriate for the state capital and thus the planning of the telecommunication tower had to begin again.

There is no observation deck on the Telemax. The building is of architectural interest due to its square surfaces. In 1997, Böckler received the reinforced concrete prize The Art of Reinforcement (Die Kunst des Bewehrens) for the tower's truss structure.

The Telemax is in the city's Buchholz-Kleefeld district, which is about 8 kilometres (5.0 mi) from the city centre. It can be seen from all over this part of the city, and is an obvious landmark. It can be seen from the highway from about 20 kilometres (12 mi) away, from the A 2 near Lehrte, for example. The name of the previous radio tower in the city was changed to VW-Tower after this new tower went into service. The tower is illuminated in magenta, the corporate colour of Deutsche Telekom AG, for special occasions, such as the Hannover Messe or CeBit.

== See also ==
- List of towers
- List of masts
