= Ihme-Zentrum =

Residential and business complex in Hanover, Lower Saxony

Coordinates: 52°22′15″N 9°43′02″E

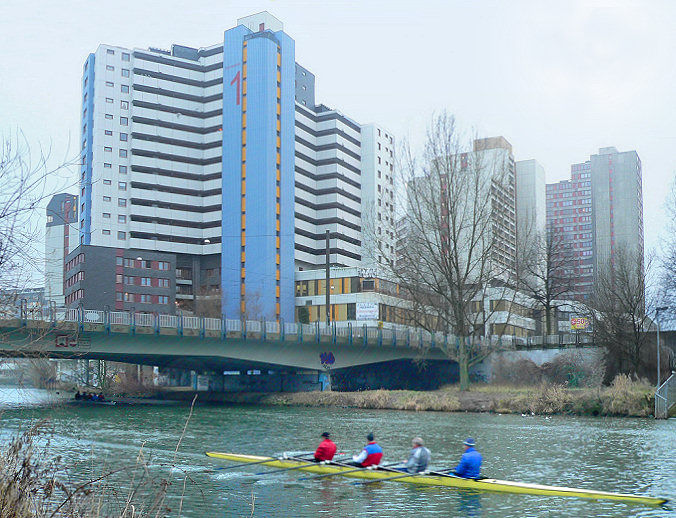
The Ihme river and northern side of the Ihme Centre

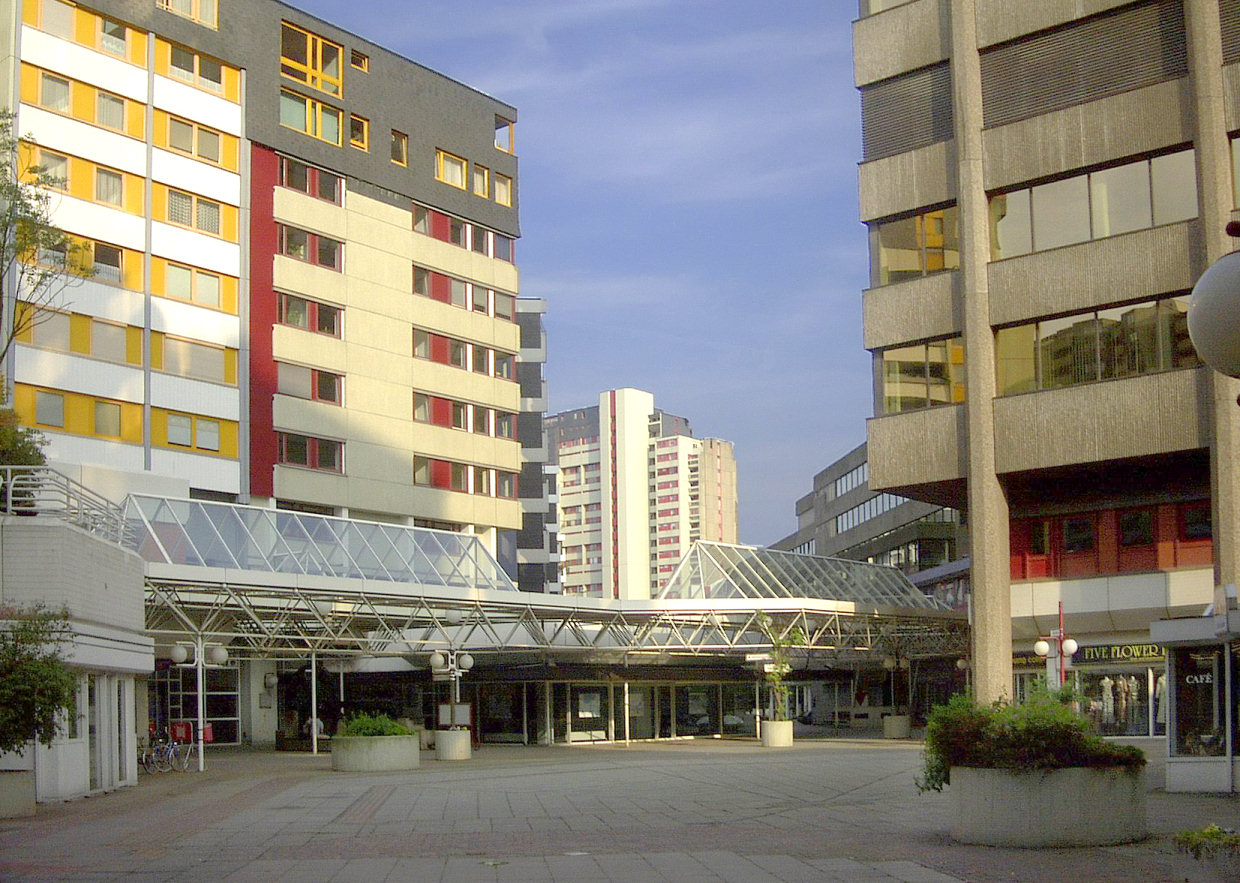
Shopping mall in June 2003

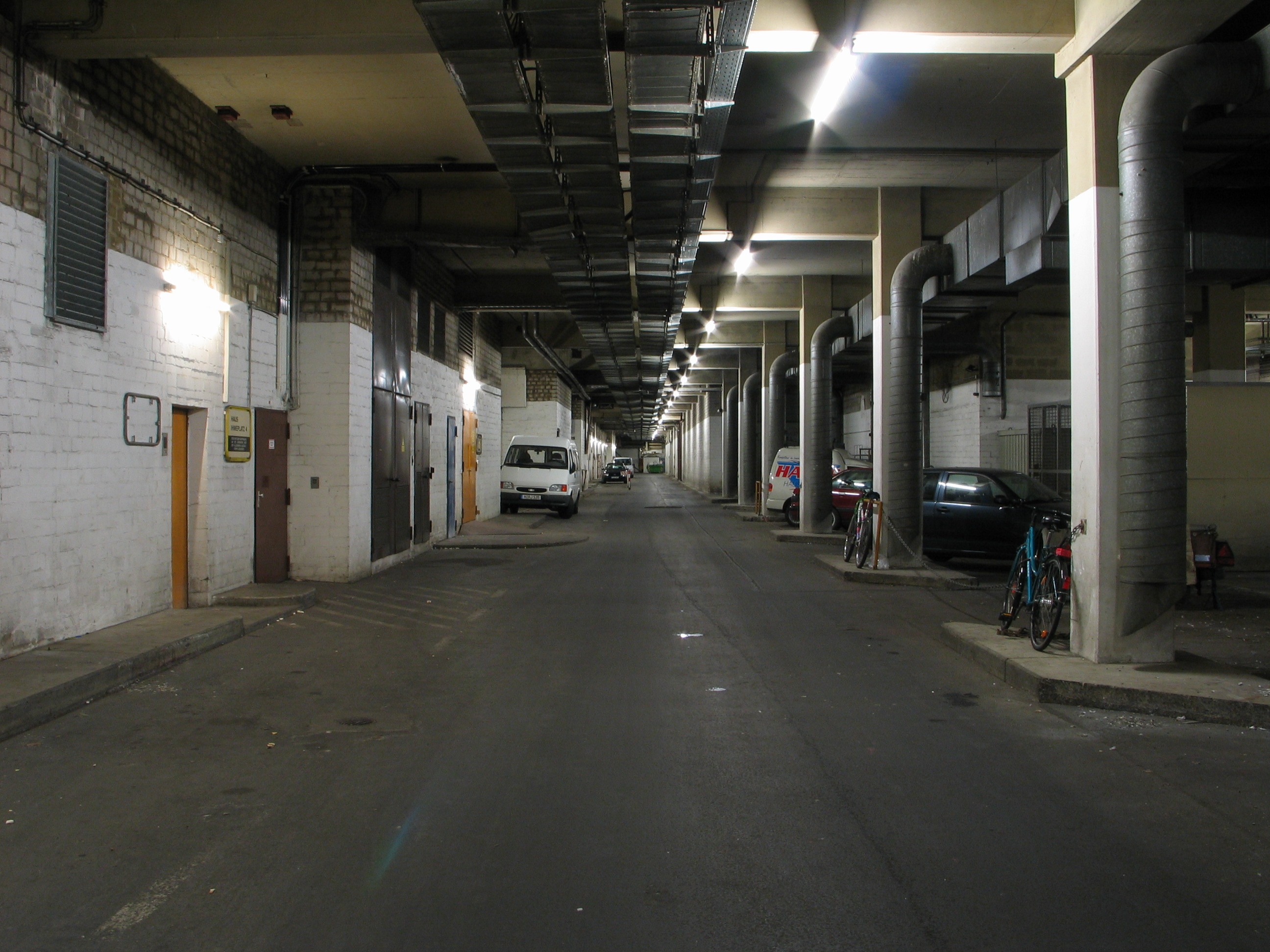
Base level of the Ihme Centre in 2004

The Ihme Centre (German: Ihme-Zentrum) is a residential, business and former shopping centre in Hanover between the Linden and Calenberger Neustadt quarters. It is located on the western bank of the Ihme river.

== Size ==
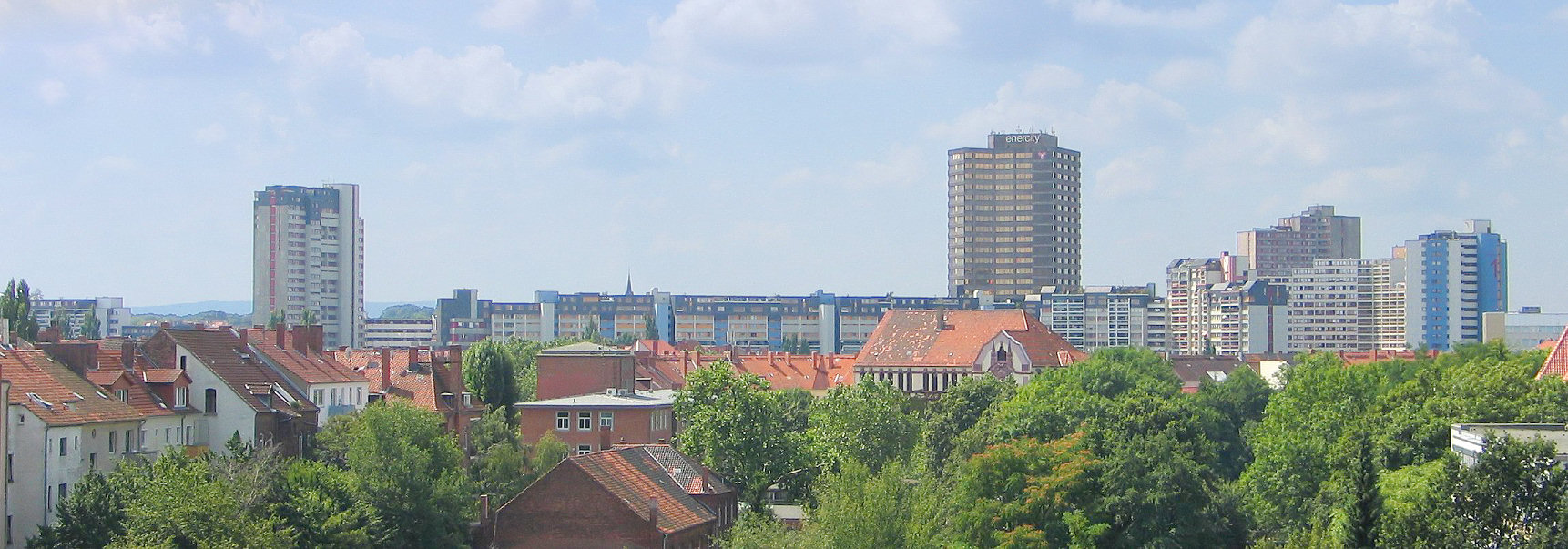
Ihme Centre seen from the east

The complex has commercial areas totalling 60,000 square metres (650,000 sq ft) and residential areas totalling 58,300 square metres (628,000 sq ft) comprising about 860 apartments (for about 2,400 people) and 8,000 square metres (86,000 sq ft) for about 450 students. There are three high-rise buildings (of about 20 floors) for residential and one for office use.

== Ownership ==
In July 2006 the ownership of the office and commercial areas changed from Engel to the American Carlyle Group. In 2019, it changed to the Tennor group of Lars Windhorst.
