= Germany–Ghana relations =

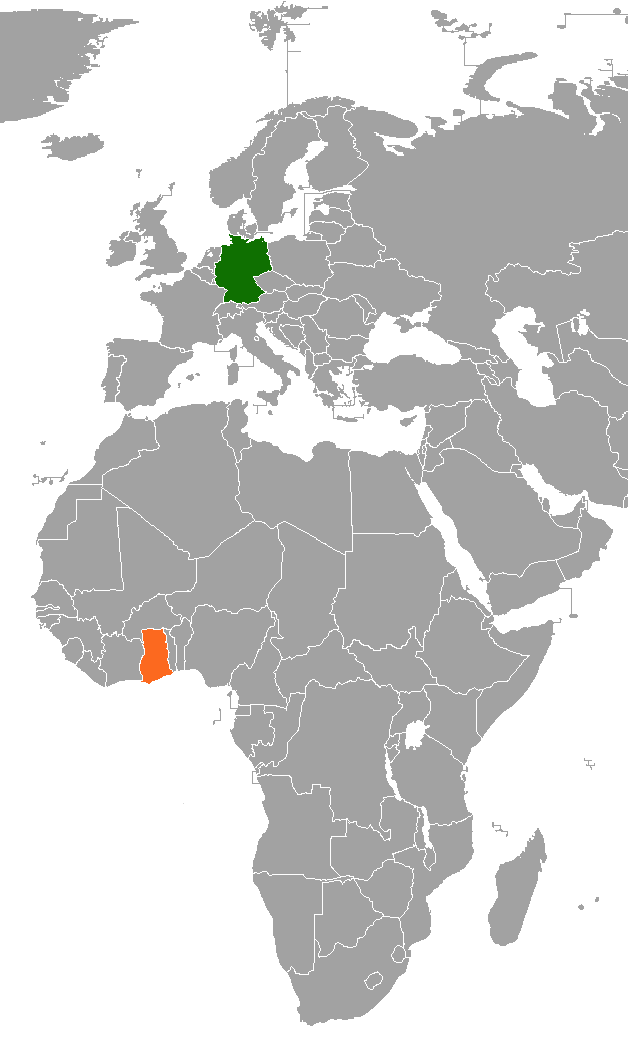

- Germany: Ghana

Germany–Ghana relations are good and Ghana is one of the priority countries for German development aid. Official Diplomatic Relations between the two countries were established in the 1950s, but contacts between the two societies go back much further and can be traced back to the 17th century.

== History ==
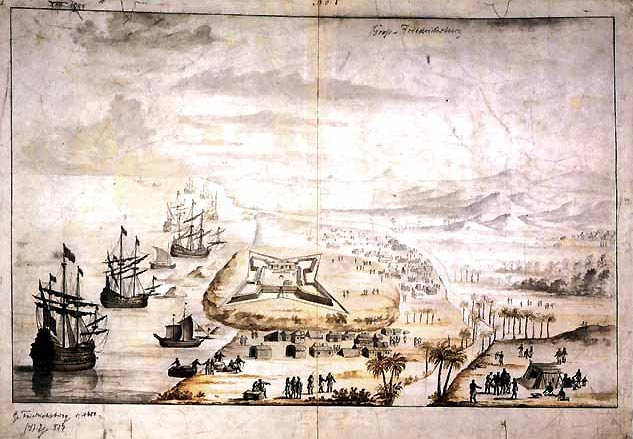
Fortress Großfriedrichsburg (1684)

The oldest recorded contact dates back to 1661, when the preacher Wilhelm Müller from Harburg was appointed preacher for the Danish Colony on the Gold Coast in Africa. His work, Die Africanische auf der Guineischen Gold-Cust gelegene Landschafft Fetu, was one of the earliest sources on life on the Gold Coast, now modern day Ghana. In 1682, Friedrich Wilhelm I of Brandenburg sent an expedition under Otto Friedrich von der Groeben to the Gold Coast, after officers from Brandenburg had signed a treaty of friendship with the Ahanta. A year later, the colony of Great Fredericksburg was established to secure the transatlantic slave trade at Cape Three Points, which was sold to the Dutch in 1717.

In the 18th century, Anton Wilhelm Amo became the first African-born philosopher and scientist in Germany. He taught at the universities of Wittenberg, Halle, and Jena. In the 19th century, German missionaries such as Christian Gottlieb Blumhardt and Franz Michael Zahn were active on the Gold Coast. In 1847, the Evangelical Ewe Church was founded by Germans. In 1884, a German colony is established in the Volta Region, which belongs to German Togo until 1916, and German colonial architecture still survives in the town of Kpandu. In 1921, German missionaries were expelled from the Volta region by the British colonial authorities after World War I.

In 1932, the Kwami Affair occurred when the National Socialist Gauleiter of Weser-Ems and Prime minister of the Free State of Oldenburg, Carl Röver, tried to prevent the sermon of the Ghanaian pastor Robert Kwami on 20 September 1932 in the St. Lambert's Church in Oldenburg. The Gold Coast's involvement in World War II began with the British Empire's declaration of war on Nazi Germany in September 1939. Although no combat took place in the Gold Coast colony, the colony provided resources and manpower for the Allied powers. A total of 65,000 soldiers from the Gold Coast fought in the war against the Axis powers.

In 1956, the Federal Republic of Germany (FRG) opened a consulate in Accra, which was converted into an embassy a year later after the official establishment of diplomatic relations with the now independent state of Ghana. In 1960, Ghana opened an embassy in Bonn, the capital of the FRG. One year later, a Goethe Institute opened in Ghana and the KfW began its work in the country. In 1972, Ghana also established diplomatic relations with the German Democratic Republic (GDR) after the end of the Hallstein Doctrine.

After German reunification, Ghana opened a new embassy in Berlin. In 2018, German Chancellor Angela Merkel made a state visit to Ghana to visit its head of state, Nana Akufo-Addo. The meeting focused on migration and deepening economic ties. Germany pledged development aid in the areas of infrastructure and energy. German Development Minister Gerd Müller, who also traveled to the country, called on German companies to invest in the country.

== Economic relations ==
The total volume of trade with Ghana amounted to 641 million euros in 2021, making Ghana one of Germany's most important trading partners in Africa. Ghana purchases vehicles, machinery, and chemical products from Germany, while Germany mainly imports cocoa and petroleum from Ghana in return. Nearly 80 German companies (2018) are active in the country.

An investment protection agreement (1998) and a double taxation agreement (2007) exist between the two countries. In 2017, the two countries began a bilateral reform and investment partnership. In 2019, the third German-African Business Summit was held in Accra.

== Development cooperation ==
Ghana is one of the priority countries for German development aid abroad. Germany aims to support Ghana in achieving the Sustainable Development Goals of the United Nations. Focus topics are sustainable economic development, poverty reduction, good governance and renewable energy and energy efficiency. The German government works with various partners and also church-based organizations and nongovernmental organizations in this effort. From 1957 to 2020, Germany provided 1.57 billion euros in development aid to Ghana. From 2018 to 2020, bilateral assistance to Ghana amounted to 145.2 million euros.

== Cultural relations ==
The Goethe-Institut has been active in the country since the 1960s. Also present is the German Academic Exchange Service, which promotes student and academic exchange between the two countries. Around 3000 students from Ghana are studying in Germany as International students. There are 22 university cooperations between the two countries. In Accra, there is a German school abroad, the German Swiss International School, which has been under the sole sponsorship of the German government since 2012/13.

German missionaries played an important role in the spread of Christianity in Ghana in the 19th century. Today, partnerships exist between German and Ghanaian parishes. For example, since 1982 there has been a diocesan partnership between the Diocese of Münster and several church provinces in northern Ghana.

== Migration ==
The number of people with a migration background from Ghana in Germany is estimated at just under 49,000 (2014). Most of them live in major German cities. Between 1981 and 2013, nearly 12,400 Ghanaian nationals were naturalized in Germany. Almost 10,000 children were born of German-Ghanaian partnerships by 2009. Ghanaians are thus among the largest migrant groups from sub-Saharan Africa in Germany. Prominent German-Ghanaians include restaurateur Nelson Müller, dancer and fitness trainer Detlef Soost, singer and TV host Daniel Aminati and footballers Gerald Asamoah, Jérôme Boateng, Kevin-Prince Boateng and Dennis Aogo. The Union of Ghanaian Associations in Germany (UGAG) represents the Ghanaian community in Germany.

== Sports ==
The Ghana national team has been coached several times by coaches from Germany, including Otto Pfister, Karl-Heinz Marotzke, Burkhard Ziese, Rudi Gutendorf and Ralf Zumdick. Ghana internationals such as Otto Addo, Hans Sarpei, Prince Tagoe, Tony Yeboah and Isaac Vorsah played in Germany.

== Diplomatic missions ==
- Germany has an embassy in Accra.
- Ghana has an embassy in Berlin.
