= Georg Joel =

German Nazi Party official (1898–1981)

Acting Gauleiter, Gau Weser-Ems
- In office 26 April 1945 – 5 May 1945
- Preceded by: Paul Wegener
- Succeeded by: Position abolished

Deputy Gauleiter, Gau Weser-Ems
- In office August 1932 – 5 May 1945
- Preceded by: Heinz Spangemacher
- Succeeded by: Position abolished

Minister-president, Free State of Oldenburg
- In office 6 May 1933 – 8 May 1945
- Preceded by: Karl Röver
- Succeeded by: Theodor Tantzen

Additional positions
- 1955–1959: Landtag of Lower Saxony Deputy
- 1936–1945: Reichstag Deputy
- 1931–1933: Landtag of the Free State of Oldenburg Deputy

Personal details
- Born: 8 August 1898 Wilhelmshaven, Province of Hanover, Kingdom of Prussia, German Empire
- Died: 10 October 1981 (aged 83) Rastede, Lower Saxony, West Germany
- Party: Nazi Party (NSDAP)
- Other political affiliations: Deutschvölkischer Schutz- und Trutzbund; German Völkisch Freedom Party (DVFP); German Reich Party (DRP); National Democratic Party of Germany (NPD)
- Occupation: Civil servant, state railroad
- Civilian awards: Golden Party Badge

Military service
- Allegiance: German Empire
- Branch/service: Imperial German Army
- Years of service: 1917–1918
- Rank: Unteroffizier
- Unit: Field Artillery Regiment 62
- Battles/wars: First World War
- Military awards: Iron Cross, 2nd class Wound Badge, in black

Georg Joel (8 August 1898 – 10 October 1981) was a German Nazi Party politician. He was the long-serving Deputy Gauleiter of Gau Weser-Ems and also Minister-president of the Free State of Oldenburg throughout the Nazi regime. After the Second World War, he joined neo-Nazi parties and served in the Landtag of Lower Saxony from 1955 to 1959.

== Early life ==
The son of a shipyard locksmith, Joel was born in Wilhelmshaven and attended the local Volksschule and Oberrealschule from 1904 to 1914. He then served an apprenticeship with the Grand Duchy of Oldenburg State Railways from November 1914 to April 1917. From 1 May 1917 to December 1918, he served in the Imperial German Army during the First World War. He was deployed on the western front in Field Artillery Regiment 62. He attained the rank of Unteroffizier and was awarded the Iron Cross, 2nd class and the Wound Badge, in black. After the war, he was employed as a civil servant in the Deutsche Reichsbahn, the state railroad service, becoming a Reichsbahninspektor by 1933.

Joel was attracted to right-wing politics and, in 1920, joined Deutschvölkischer Schutz- und Trutzbund, the largest, most active, and most influential antisemitic federation in Germany. In 1922, he joined the Nazi Party. As an early Party member, he later would be awarded the Golden Party Badge. When the Party was banned in the aftermath of the failed Beer Hall Putsch, he gravitated to the German Völkisch Freedom Party, another nationalist, right-wing organization. On 6 April 1925, after the ban on the Nazi Party was lifted, he co-founded the Ortsgruppe (local group) in Oldenburg where he held various posts, including press officer, secretary and treasurer. Joel formally rejoined the Party on 12 August 1925 (membership number 15,490).

== Nazi party career ==
Joel was elected as a city councilor in Oldenburg, serving from November 1930 to March 1933. He next was elected to the Landtag of the Free State of Oldenburg on 17 May 1931, remaining a member until May 1933 and serving as its president from 16 June 1932. After the Nazi seizure of power, Joel served as special Staatskommissar (state commissioner) for the Free State of Oldenburg from March to 6 May 1933. After Carl Röver was appointed Reichsstatthalter (Reich governor) of the state, Joel succeeded him as Minister-president of the Oldenburg state government on 6 May 1933. He remained at the head of the administration until the end of the Nazi regime in May 1945. He concurrently served as the minister for foreign affairs, interior affairs, trade and transport.

In August 1932, Joel was appointed as the Deputy Gauleiter of Gau Weser-Ems. He served successively under Gauleiters Carl Röver and Paul Wegener until 5 May 1945, becoming one of the longest-serving Deputy Gauleiter. On 29 March 1936, he was elected as a deputy to the German Reichstag from electoral constituency 14 (Weser-Ems) serving until the fall of the Nazi regime. From 1937 to 30 January 1939, and again from November 1943 to May 1945, he also served as leader of the Gau personnel office (Gaupersonalamtsleiter). From 1 September 1939 to 16 November 1942, Joel was Reich Defense Advisor in Gau Weser-Ems and a member of the Defense Committee of Wehrkreis (Military District) XI. A member of the Sturmabteilung (SA), he attained the rank of SA-Brigadeführer on 9 November 1937 and was assigned to the leadership corps of SA-Gruppe Nordsee.

In the closing days of the Second World War, Gauleiter Paul Wegener was made Supreme Reich Defense Commissioner-North and left for Flensburg. Consequently, Joel ran the affairs of Gau Weser-Ems as acting Gauleiter in Wegener's absence from 26 April 1945. British forces already were overrunning the Gau, and all German forces in northwestern Germany laid down their arms on 5 May 1945 in accordance with the terms of the German surrender at Lüneburg Heath. Joel was arrested on 27 May and interned in Esterwegen.

== Postwar life ==
On 5 July 1946, Joel was released from internment for health reasons. Following proceedings by the denazification court in Bielefeld, he was classified as Category III (a lesser offender) and sentenced on 16 June 1949 to two years in prison, with partial credit for time served. On 19 April 1950, Joel found employment as a sales representative in Oldenburg.

In 1955, Joel reentered politics and joined the Deutsche Reichspartei (German Reich Party, DRP), a far-right, nationalist and neo-Nazi group. The following year, Joel was elected as a city councilor of Oldenburg. He also was elected on the DRP slate to the Landtag of Lower Saxony, serving from 6 May 1955 to 5 May 1959. He served from May 1955 to October 1957, and from June 1958 to May 1959, as Party spokesman in the Landtag. From 1957 to 1959, and from 1963 to 1964, he was a member of the Party executive committee. In 1961, he was deputy chairman of the DRP Regional Association of Lower Saxony.

In 1964, the DRP merged with other small right wing parties to form the National Democratic Party of Germany (NPD), another ultra-nationalist, neo-Nazi entity. Joel was a member of its executive committee and editor of their weekly newspaper Deutsche Nachrichten (German News). In 1967, he became the owner of its publishing house, Deutsche Nachrichten GmbH. In 1979 and 1980, Joel led the fight against the installation of a memorial plaque in the former Esterwegen concentration camp. He died in Rastede in October 1981.

Until the end of his life, Joel remained an unrepentant Nazi sympathizer and denied the criminal character of the National Socialist regime.

== Sources ==
- Höffkes, Karl (1986). Hitlers Politische Generale. Die Gauleiter des Dritten Reiches: ein biographisches Nachschlagewerk. Tübingen: Grabert-Verlag. ISBN 3-87847-163-7.
- Miller, Michael D.; Schulz, Andreas (2017). Gauleiter: The Regional Leaders of the Nazi Party and Their Deputies, 1925-1945. Vol. II (Georg Joel - Dr. Bernhard Rust). R. James Bender Publishing. ISBN 978-1-932970-32-6.
