= Carl Röver =

German Nazi Party official (1889–1942)

Carl Georg Röver
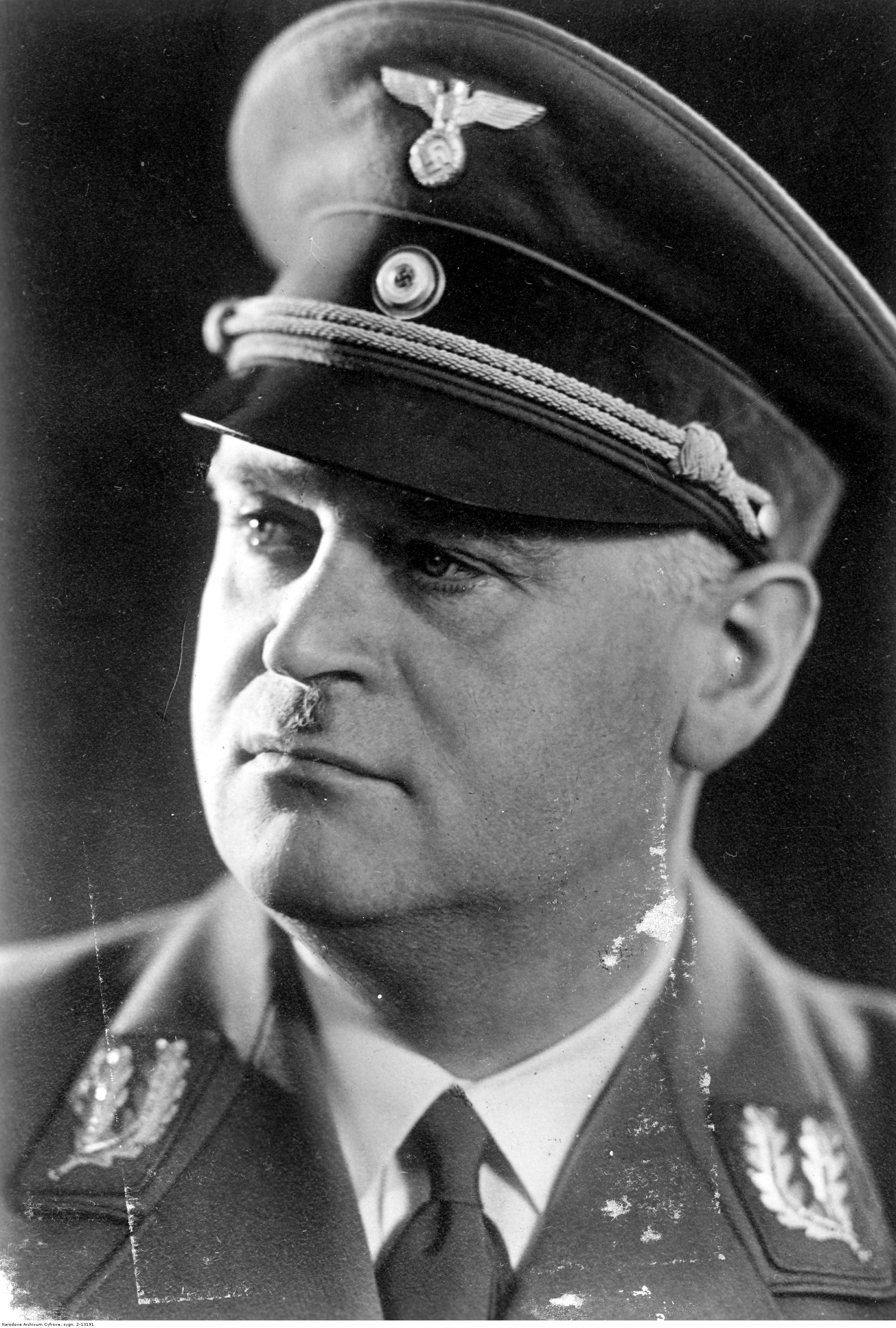

Gauleiter of Gau Weser-Ems
- In office 1 October 1928 – 15 May 1942
- Succeeded by: Paul Wegener

Reichsstatthalter of the Free State of Oldenburg
- In office 5 May 1933 – 15 May 1942
- Prime Minister: Georg Joel
- Preceded by: None
- Succeeded by: Paul Wegener

Reichsstatthalter of the Free City of Bremen
- In office 5 May 1933 – 15 May 1942
- Preceded by: None
- Succeeded by: Paul Wegener

Minister-President of the Free State of Oldenburg
- In office 16 June 1932 – 5 May 1933
- Preceded by: Friedrich Cassebohm
- Succeeded by: Georg Joel

Personal details
- Born: 12 February 1889 Lemwerder, German Empire
- Died: 15 May 1942 (aged 53) Berlin, Nazi Germany
- Party: National Socialist German Workers' Party (NSDAP)

Carl Georg Röver (12 February 1889 – 15 May 1942) was a German Nazi Party official. His main posts were as Gauleiter of Gau Weser-Ems and Reichsstatthalter of both Oldenburg and Bremen.

== Early years ==
Röver was born in Lemwerder and saw service in the First World War, initially with the regular army before joining the Propaganda department of the Oberste Heeresleitung. He originally became a member of the Nazi Party in 1923, and rejoined in 1925 following its period of outlaw. He also joined the Sturmabteilung (SA) rising to the rank of Obergruppenführer on 9 November 1938. He also attained an Obergruppenführer rank in the National Socialist Motor Corps (Nationalsozialistisches Kraftfahrerkorps or NSKK) on 30 January 1939.

== Nazi career ==
Already before the Nazi seizure of power, Carl Röver had been active in politics. He joined the Oldenburg Stadtsrat (Municipal Council) in 1924. He was an Ortsgruppenleiter for the party in April 1925 and a Bezirksleiter (District Leader) in Oldenburg and East Friesland in July 1927. On 20 May 1928 he became a member of the Oldenburg Landtag. Finally, Adolf Hitler appointed him Gauleiter when the Gau Weser-Ems was established on 1 October 1928. In September 1930, he was elected to the Reichstag from electoral constituency 14, Weser-Ems, and he would retain this seat until his death. On 16 June 1932, he became Minister-president of Oldenburg, thus uniting under his control the highest party and governmental offices in his jurisdiction.

When in September 1932 the Oldenburg superior church council, the executive board of the Evangelical Lutheran Church in Oldenburg, decided to give permission to use the St. Lambert's Church in Oldenburg city for the sermon of the African Pastor Robert Kwami. Röver reacted immediately, directing racist tirades against Kwami, the Norddeutsche Mission and the superior church council demanding to postpone the sermon. The Nazi-party called upon the State Ministry of Oldenburg, the Nazi-dominated state government, to stop the sermon. Despite the public threats by the local Nazis that were later become known as the so-called Kwami Affair, the sermon was carried out as planned on 20 September 1932.

On 5 May 1933 Röver was appointed to the post of Reichsstatthalter for the states of both Oldenburg and Bremen after the Nazi regime effectively took centralized control of the state governments in Germany. In this post he played a role in the perpetration of the Holocaust as he personally signed the order for every Jew deported from Bremen during his life.

However, in this role Röver also clashed with Reichsmarschall Hermann Göring, who as Minister President of Prussia, made no secret of his desire to incorporate Bremen into Prussia. Röver, however, opposed the move consistently and managed to convince Hitler to decline Göring's requests.

On 4 September 1935, Rover was made a member of Hans Frank's Academy for German Law. He was something of a favourite of Martin Bormann, a fact that helped to ensure that when an Arbeitsbereich ("working sphere" - an external unit of the Nazi Party) was set up in the neighbouring occupied Netherlands most of its staff were drawn from Weser-Ems.

== Death ==
Röver supposedly suffered a stroke in May 1942 and died in Berlin soon afterwards, Paul Wegener succeeding him as Gauleiter. His official cause of death is listed in some sources as pneumonia and in others as heart failure. His state funeral at the Reich Chancellery in Berlin proved a lavish event, with Adolf Hitler himself in attendance and Alfred Rosenberg delivering the eulogy.

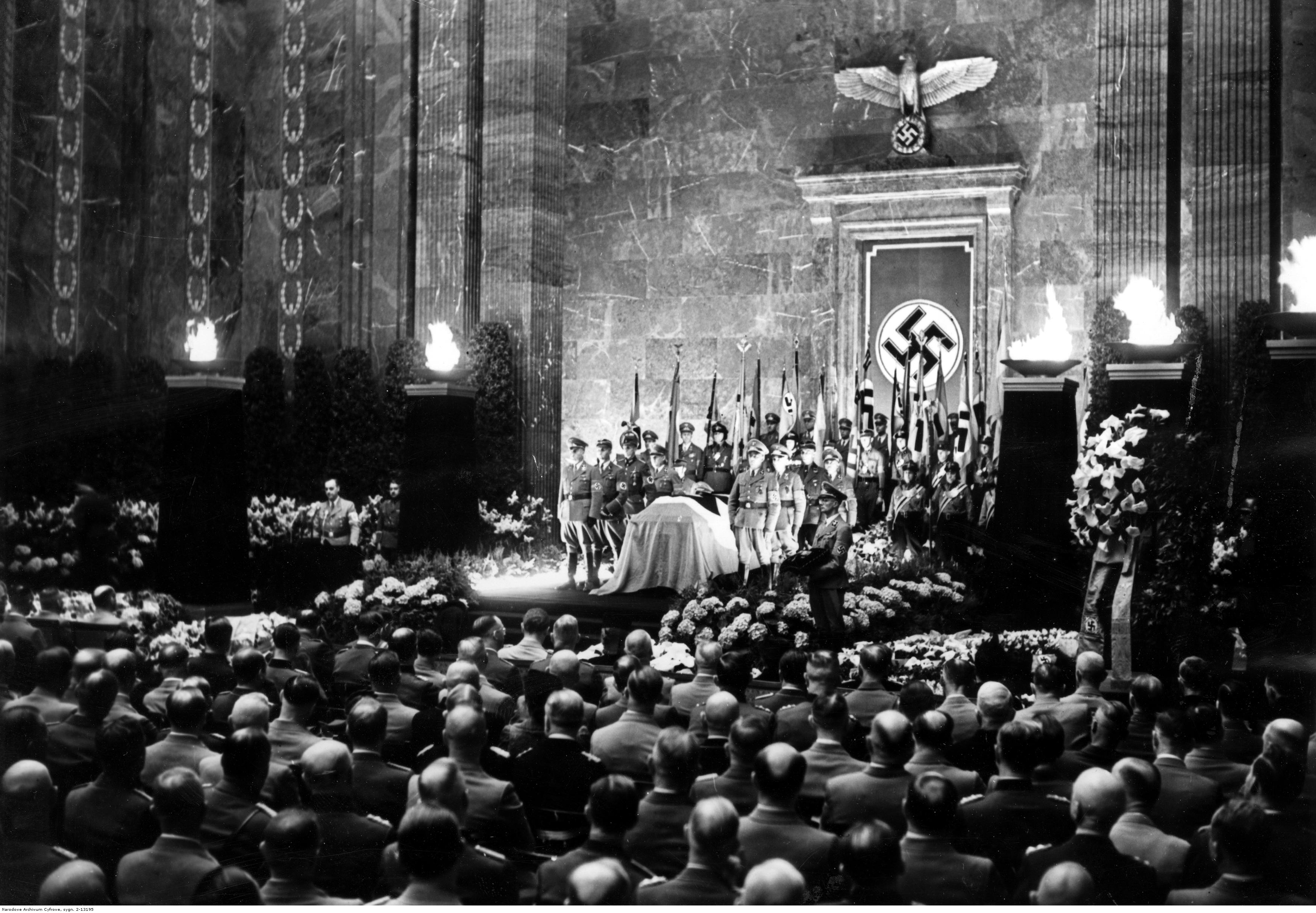
Reich Minister Alfred Rosenberg delivers the eulogy at the funeral ceremony for Gauleiter Karl Röver, 22 May 1942

Röver's cause of death is disputed by David Irving, who claims in his book Hitler's War that Röver was killed by Nazi agents who had been sent specifically by Martin Bormann. This is also the conclusion of Bormann's biographer Jochen Von Lang, who states that Röver's increasingly erratic behaviour was caused by progressive dementia brought on by late stage syphilis, supposedly contracted before the First World War: “Bormann ordered that the nature of the disease be kept secret. From Munich he dispatched two agents to Oldenburg who, on 15 May, were able to report to him that Röver had died, officially from heart failure.”
