= Paul Wegener (Gauleiter) =

German Nazi Party official and politician (1908–1993)

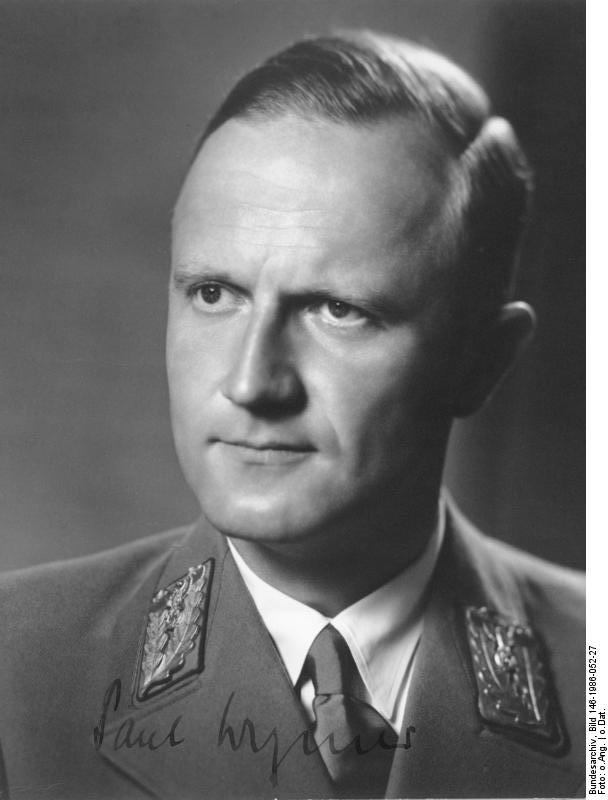

Gauleiter, Gau Weser-Ems
- In office 18 May 1942 – 8 May 1945
- Preceded by: Carl Röver
- Succeeded by: Position abolished

Reichsstatthalter, Free State of Oldenburg
- In office 18 May 1942 – 8 May 1945
- Preceded by: Carl Röver
- Succeeded by: Position abolished

Reichsstatthalter, Bremen
- In office 18 May 1942 – 8 May 1945
- Preceded by: Carl Röver
- Succeeded by: Position abolished

Leader of Task Force "Wegener," Reichskommissariat Norwegen
- In office 1 October 1940 – 15 May 1942
- Preceded by: Position created
- Succeeded by: Hans-Hendrik Neumann

Deputy Gauleiter of Gau Kurmark
- In office 7 August 1936 – 15 May 1942
- Preceded by: Werner Schmuck
- Succeeded by: Victor von Podbielski

Personal details
- Born: 1 October 1908 Varel, Grand Duchy of Oldenburg, German Empire
- Died: 5 May 1993 (aged 84) Wächtersbach, Bavaria, Germany
- Party: Nazi Party

Military service
- Allegiance: Nazi Germany
- Branch/service: Luftwaffe; Waffen SS
- Years of service: 1937; 1941
- Rank: Gefreiter; SS-Obergruppenführer
- Unit: Artillery Regiment 6, 1st SS Division Leibstandarte SS Adolf Hitler
- Battles/wars: German invasion of Greece
- Awards: Iron Cross, 2nd class

Paul Wegener (1 October 1908 – 5 May 1993) was a German Nazi Party official and politician who served as the Gauleiter of Gau Weser-Ems as well as the Reichsstatthalter of both Bremen and the Free State of Oldenburg.

== Early life ==
Wegener was born in Varel, the son of a physician. He attended Volksschule and Realschule in Varel before graduating from the Ballenstedt gymnasium in 1926. He then trained in agriculture at the Colonial Training School in Witzenhausen, receiving certification in colonial administration in 1928. He served an apprenticeship in an import/export business in Bremen for two years and then was employed until 1931 as a buyer for Daimler Benz, also in Bremen.

== Nazi Party functionary ==
Wegener joined the Nazi Party on 1 August 1930 (membership number 286,225) and the Sturmabteilung (SA) on 1 February 1931. He became the Ortsgruppenleiter for the Ortsgruppe (Local Group) in Varel on 10 April 1931, and was at the time the youngest person holding such a post. From the autumn of 1931 to 1 January 1932 he served as the adjutant to a battalion leader of Standarte 19 in Varel. His next assignments through October 1933 were as the SA-Standartenführer of Standarte 19 and then Standarte 75 in Bremen. He was promoted to Kreisleiter (District Leader) for Bremen on 11 March 1933, also serving as the propaganda leader there. He also became a Bremen City Councilor and a member of the Bremen State Parliament in that year. On 12 November 1933, Wegener was elected to the Reichstag for electoral constituency 14, Weser-Ems. Wegener would remain a Reichstag Deputy until the end of the Nazi regime.

On 11 July 1934, Wegener made an important career move by becoming the adjutant to Reichsleiter Martin Bormann, then the Chief of Staff in the office of the Deputy Führer. Wegener moved to the Party central headquarters at the Brown House in Munich where his efficiency and hard work impressed Bormann. He now began a rapid rise as Bormann’s “golden boy.” Wilhelm Kube was removed as Gauleiter of Kurmark after penning an anonymous attack on the wife of Supreme Party Court Chairman Walter Buch, and he was replaced by Emil Stürtz with Wegener appointed as Deputy Gauleiter on 7 August 1936.

In an assessment report dated 20 August 1936, Bormann wrote of Wegener:

“reliable … hard working, absolutely loyal, pronounced leadership type, who is able to win over people … has a good knowledge of the party’s organization and internal conditions … Possesses all prerequisites for high party office.”

At the same time, Wegener was made a Prussian Provincial Councilor for Brandenburg and Posen-West Prussia. In March 1937, he performed military service with the rank of Gefreiter in the Luftwaffe reserves. He was promoted to SA-Brigadeführer on 9 November 1937. On 30 January 1938, he was awarded the Golden Party Badge. At the 10 April 1938 Reichstag election, he was reelected as a deputy from constituency 4, Potsdam I.

Wegener switched from the SA to the Schutzstaffel (SS) on 20 April 1940, entering with the rank of SS-Brigadeführer and subsequently obtaining the ranks of SS-Gruppenführer on 9 November 1942 and SS-Obergruppenführer on 1 August 1944. As a member of the Waffen SS, Wegener saw active service with Artillery Regiment 6 of the 1st SS Division Leibstandarte SS Adolf Hitler during the German invasion of Greece in April 1941, and was awarded the Iron Cross, 2nd class.

== Assignment in Norway ==
On 20 April 1940 Josef Terboven, newly appointed as Reichskommissar for the occupied Norwegian territories, selected Wegener to serve as his deputy. On 15 July 1940, he was named Regional Commissioner for Northern Norway, based in Trondheim, remaining there through September. From the start, Wegener was hostile to the notion that Vidkun Quisling should take a leading role in the new government, instead favouring the idea that the Nazis should establish their own administrative system in Norway. Eventually when it was decided to include Quisling, Wegener took up his next assignment on 1 October as the leader of a special task force acting as political advisor and liaison officer to the Norwegian administration. Named the Einsatzstab Wegener, it placed pro-Wegener men in each branch of the Nasjonal Samling, both to improve its organisation and to ensure complicity with the demands of the governing Nazis. Wegener left Norway in May 1942 for his next assignment, and Hans-Hendrik Neumann took over as Terboven's number two.

== Gauleiter ==
Carl Röver, Gauleiter of Gau Weser-Ems, died on 15 May 1942 after a stroke, and on 18 May Wegener was named to succeed him. Wegener also replaced Röver as Reichsstatthalter (Reich Governor) of the states of Bremen and Oldenburg. He thus united under his control the highest party and governmental offices within his jurisdiction. On 16 November 1942, he was appointed Reich Defense Commissioner for his Gau. In this capacity, he had jurisdiction over civil defense and evacuation measures, as well as control over the war economy, including rationing and suppression of black market activities. He served in these positions through the end of the war in Europe.

Soon after his appointment, Wegener produced an internal document, the 267 page "Wegener Memorandum," in which it was said that the Nazi Party should be purged of much of its vast membership and instead be reorganised as an elite group to provide leadership for future generations of Germany. To this end, Wegener proposed a reorganisation of the Hitler Youth to bring it under the control of the Party bureaucracy rather than the State. This new Hitler Youth would provide all the future membership of the Nazi Party, with most existing party members absorbed into the SA, which was to be reconstituted as a veterans’ organization. His plan also called for a strengthening of the role of the Nazi Party Chancellery and this occurred in the following months as Wegener's old mentor Bormann was given greater power at the expense of the other Reichsleiters of the Party and the Reichsministers of the cabinet.

Wegener was proposed by Bormann as a possible replacement for Baldur von Schirach as Gauleiter of Vienna in 1943 and 1944 but ultimately was not appointed. However, in August 1944, shortly after Joseph Goebbels was made Plenipotentiary for Total War, Wegener was made his administrative assistant with the title of "Head of the Executive Committee for the Organization of Total War." This made him one of only two permanent staff members appointed at the national level (the other being Werner Naumann as head of planning activities). Wegener also was placed on the staff of the Reichsführer-SS at this time. In September 1944, he became the leader of the newly created Volkssturm units in his Gau.

On 23 April 1945, Wegener was given the newly created post of Supreme Reich Civil Defense Commissioner in the Northern Theater, appointed on the recommendation of Großadmiral Karl Dönitz. By this time Bremen was already under siege by British army forces, but Wegener broadcast appeals to the populace to continue fighting to the last man, and refused to consider surrender negotiations. Consequently, the British attacked with artillery and RAF bombers. When the city finally surrendered on 27 April, some 760 soldiers and civilians were estimated to have been killed, and it was discovered that Wegener had fled the city toward Flensburg the previous day. On 5 May 1945, Dönitz, who had succeeded Adolf Hitler as head of state, appointed Wegener to his government as Chief of the Civilian Cabinet and Chief of the Presidential Chancellery with the rank of State Secretary. Wegener was arrested on 23 May 1945 with the rest of the Flensburg government.

== Post-war life ==
Interned at Camp Ashcan and later at Fallingbostel, Wegener underwent denazification proceedings in Bielefeld for his leadership role in the Nazi Party and the SS. On 28 November 1949 he was categorized as a “Lesser Offender” and was sentenced to 6 years and 6 months imprisonment with credit for time served. Further charged in the Oldenburg district court in connection with civilian deaths, he was found guilty in June 1950 but received no additional prison time. He was incarcerated at Esterwegen prison and was released in May 1951 due to a plea for clemency submitted by Karl Arnold, the Minister-President of North Rhine-Westphalia. He then was employed in Sinzheim and then Wächtersbach as a salesman and contract officer at a timber trading company. In October 1952 Wegener was ordered to stand trial again for manslaughter in the deaths of civilians in the spring of 1945. However, he was acquitted of these charges on 18 June 1953. According to British secret service files Wegener was also involved from 1951 to 1953 with an underground Neo-Nazi group organised by Werner Naumann and known as the Naumann Circle, which was involved in attempts to infiltrate the Free Democratic Party.

== See also ==
- List SS-Obergruppenführer

== Sources ==
- Dahl, Hans Fredrik (1999). Quisling: A Study in Treachery. Cambridge University Press. ISBN 978-0-521-49697-1.
- Hayes, Paul M. (1971). Quisling: The Career and Political Ideas of Vidkun Quisling 1887-1945. David & Charles. ISBN 978-0-253-34760-2.
- Höffkes, Karl (1986). Hitlers Politische Generale. Die Gauleiter des Dritten Reiches: ein biographisches Nachschlagewerk. Tübingen: Grabert-Verlag. ISBN 3-87847-163-7.
- Klee, Ernst (2005). Das Personenlexikon zum Dritten Reich. Wer war was vor und nach 1945. Frankfurt am Main: Fischer Taschenbuch Verlag, Zweite aktualisierte Auflage. ISBN 978-3-868-20311-0.
- Miller, Michael D.; Schulz, Andreas (2021). Gauleiter: The Regional Leaders of the Nazi Party and Their Deputies, 1925 - 1945. Vol. 3 (Fritz Sauckel - Hans Zimmermann). Fonthill Media. ISBN 978-1-781-55826-3.
- Orlow, Dietrich (1973). The History of the Nazi Party: 1933-1945. University of Pittsburgh Press. ISBN 0-822-9-3253-9.
