= Kwami Affair =

Anti-black incident in Weimar Republic

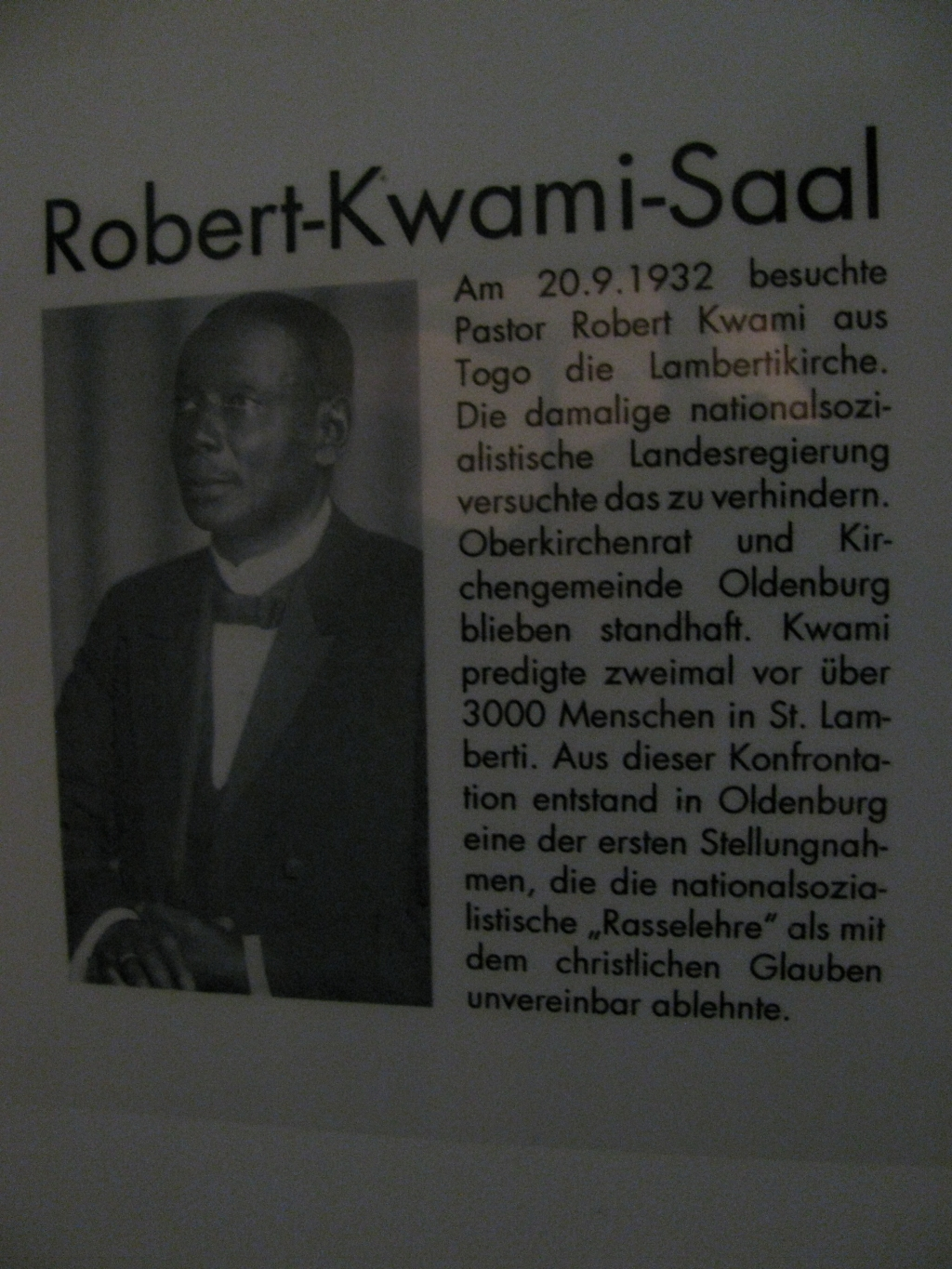
Information about Robert Kwami in St. Lambert's Church, Oldenburg

The Kwami Affair was an incident in 1932 when a Nazi Carl Röver attempted to stop Ghanaian pastor Robert Kwami from delivering a sermon in Oldenburg, Germany.

Robert Kwami, a representative of the Protestant Ewe-Church, had come to Germany in summer 1932. He was invited by the Norddeutsche Missionsgesellschaft in order to hold a lecture tour with sermons in Northern Germany to inform the German people about Christianity in the former German colony of Togoland and to collect donations to support the young African church. Donations had been scarce in the age of depression. Sixty events had been planned, but due to great public interest 150 lectures and sermons were carried out in 82 towns in Lippe, East Frisia, the County of Bentheim and in the Free State of Oldenburg. This included a planned sermon in the St. Lamberti Church in September 20, 1932, for which the Evangelical Lutheran Church in Oldenburg had given permission.

By 1932, the Oldenburg free state was governed by the Nazi Party. Gauleiter Carl Röver, who was also Minister-President of Oldenberg, reacted to the proposed sermon, directing racist tirades against Kwami, the Norddeutsche Mission and the supreme church council, and demanding the sermon be postponed. The Nazi-party called upon the State Ministry of Oldenburg to stop the sermon.

The church parish asked Heinrich Tilemann, member of the Oberkirchenrat, for help, who defended the plans of the church. However, Röver could not be stopped, and in a speech on September 16, 1932 he incited members of the Nazi-party to take action. Concerned about the security of Robert Kwami the parish, Oldenburg Pastor Erich Hoyer sent an open letter to 35 German newspapers wherein he accused the Nazi minister of arousing hatred against the church and the initiators of the sermon and asked for an apology. In the meantime church councillor Dr. Buck, expecting uproar and violence from the Nazis, asked Oldenburg's mayor Dr. Goerlitz for police protection.

Despite the public threats by local Nazis, the sermon was carried out as planned on September 20, 1932. Kwami, who was fluent in German and also of German citizenship, held his sermon in the afternoon and a lecture in the evening. The event was a great success. About 2000 people filled the pews of the church, with people waiting in front of the church to listen, to support Kwami, and to encourage the young African pastor. Due to the open letter that Pastor Hoyer had sent to 35 newspapers, the “Kwami Affair” had become a topic talk not only in Germany, but was also covered in British and Dutch newspapers.

== See also ==
- Persecution of black people in Nazi Germany
