= Oldenburg Landtag elections in the Weimar Republic =

German state elections

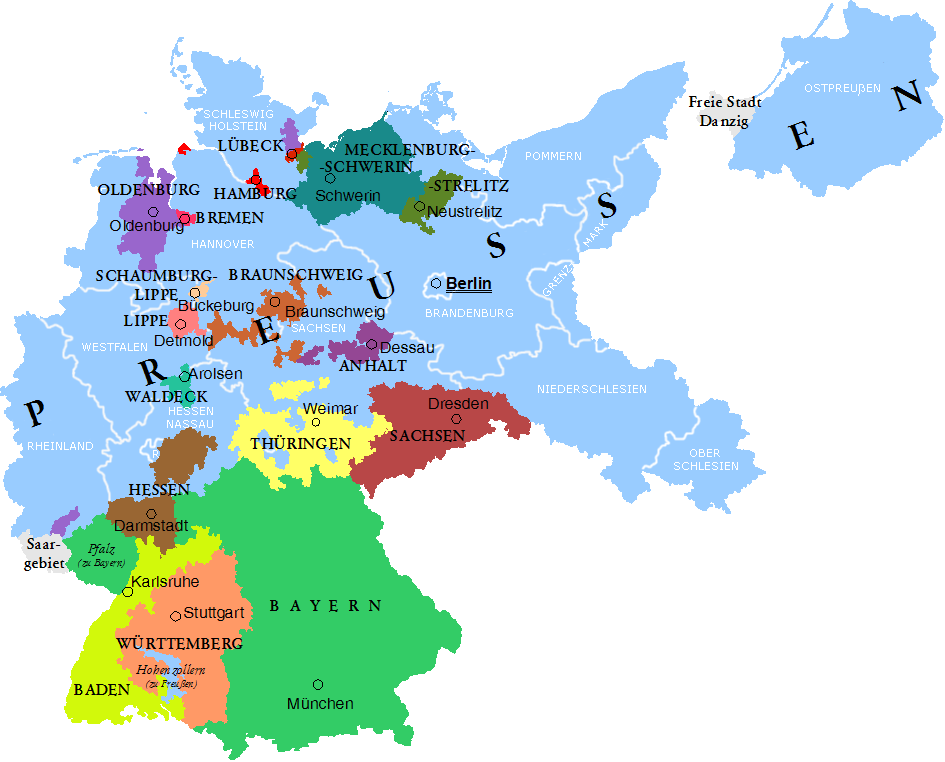
Map of the Weimar Republic states – Oldenburg in purple at top left

Landtag elections in the Free State of Oldenburg (Freistaat Oldenburg) during the Weimar Republic were held at irregular intervals between 1919 and 1932. Results with regard to the total vote, the percentage of the vote won and the number of seats allocated to each party are presented in the tables below. On 31 March 1933, the sitting Landtag was dissolved by the Nazi-controlled central government and reconstituted to reflect the distribution of seats in the national Reichstag. The Landtag subsequently was formally abolished as a result of the "Law on the Reconstruction of the Reich" of 30 January 1934 which replaced the German federal system with a unitary state.

== 1919 ==
The 1919 Oldenburg state election was held on 23 February 1919 to elect the 48 members of the constituent assembly. The election was held in Birkenfeld on 9 March.

1919 Oldenburg Landtag election
Party	Votes	%	Seats
Social Democratic Party of Germany	65,027	33.44	16
German Democratic Party	60,442	31.08	15
Centre Party	42,716	21.97	11
German People's Party	22,128	11.38	5
German National People's Party	4,140	2.13	1
Total	194,453	100.00	48
Valid votes	194,453	99.74	
Invalid/blank votes	511	0.26	
Total votes	194,964	100.00	
Registered voters/turnout	292,956	66.55	
Source: Elections in the Weimar Republic, Elections in Germany

== 1920 ==
The 1920 Oldenburg state election was held on 6 June 1920 to elect the 48 members of the Landtag.

1920 Oldenburg Landtag election
Party	Votes	%	Seats	+/–
Social Democratic Party of Germany	53,482	25.87	13	–3
Centre Party	41,816	20.23	10	–1
German People's Party	31,254	15.12	8	+3
German Democratic Party	30,109	14.56	6	–9
Independent Social Democratic Party of Germany	22,797	11.03	5	New
German Democratic Party, German People's Party and Farmers' League in Birkenfeld	8,544	4.13	3	New
German National People's Party and German People's Party in Lübeck	6,721	3.25	2	New
Farmers' League	6,614	3.20	1	New
German National People's Party	2,772	1.34	0	–1
Communist Party of Germany	2,625	1.27	0	New
Total	206,734	100.00	48	0
Valid votes	206,734	98.10		
Invalid/blank votes	4,014	1.90		
Total votes	210,748	100.00		
Source: Elections in the Weimar Republic, Elections in Germany

== 1923 ==
The 1923 Oldenburg state election was held on 10 June 1923 to elect the 48 members of the Landtag.

1923 Oldenburg Landtag election
Party	Votes	%	Seats	+/–
Social Democratic Party of Germany	46,072	23.76	12	–1
German People's Party	43,888	22.63	12	+4
Centre Party	40,067	20.66	10	0
German Democratic Party	36,138	18.63	9	+3
German National People's Party	13,467	6.94	3	+1
Communist Party of Germany	12,068	6.22	2	+2
Independent Social Democratic Party of Germany	2,231	1.15	0	–5
Total	193,931	100.00	48	0
Valid votes	193,931	99.65		
Invalid/blank votes	685	0.35		
Total votes	194,616	100.00		
Registered voters/turnout	274,768	70.83		
Source: Elections in the Weimar Republic, Elections in Germany

- NOTE: As a result of separate elections held in Oldenburg's Birkenfeld district in May 1924, the German People's Party seats decreased to 11 and the Communist Party seats increased to 3.

== 1925 ==
The 1925 Oldenburg state election was held on 24 May 1925 to elect the 40 members of the Landtag.

1925 Oldenburg Landtag election
Party	Votes	%	Seats	+/–
Landesblock (German National People's Party–German People's Party)	60,516	34.63	15	0
Centre Party	42,704	24.44	10	0
Social Democratic Party of Germany	39,249	22.46	9	-3
German Democratic Party	23,879	13.67	5	-4
German Völkisch Freedom Party	4,404	2.52	1	New
Communist Party of Germany	3,579	2.05	0	-2
Socialist League of Germany	403	0.23	0	New
Total	174,734	100.00	40	-8
Valid votes	174,734	99.45		
Invalid/blank votes	974	0.55		
Total votes	175,708	100.00		
Registered voters/turnout	319,684	54.96		
Source: Elections in the Weimar Republic, Elections in Germany

== 1928 ==
The 1928 Oldenburg state election was held on 20 May 1928 to elect the 48 members of the Landtag.

1928 Oldenburg Landtag election
Party	Votes	%	Seats	+/–
Social Democratic Party of Germany	67,005	28.86	15	+6
Landesblock (German National People's Party and German People's Party)	41,113	17.71	9	−6
Centre Party	39,602	17.06	9	−1
German Democratic Party	24,771	10.67	5	0
Nazi Party	17,457	7.52	3	New
Christian-National Peasants' and Farmers' Party	14,450	6.22	3	New
Economic Association (Oldenburg Region) and Economic Party (Birkenfeld Region)	11,763	5.07	2	New
Communist Party of Germany	8,490	3.66	1	+1
Farmers and Middle Class List (Völkischnationaler Block)	4,896	2.11	1	New
Christian Social Reich Party	1,343	0.58	0	New
Reents (Non-partisan)	1,264	0.54	0	New
Total	232,154	100.00	48	+8
Valid votes	232,154	98.90		
Invalid/blank votes	2,577	1.10		
Total votes	234,731	100.00		
Registered voters/turnout	334,961	70.08		
Source: Elections in the Weimar Republic, Elections in Germany

== 1931 ==
The 1931 Oldenburg state election was held on 17 May 1931 to elect the 48 members of the Landtag.

1931 Oldenburg Landtag election
Party	Votes	%	Seats	+/–
Nazi Party	97,802	37.23	19	+16
Social Democratic Party of Germany	54,893	20.90	11	−4
Centre Party	46,255	17.61	9	0
Communist Party of Germany	18,942	7.21	3	+2
German National People's Party	12,653	4.82	2	New
German People's Party	10,774	4.10	2	New
German State Party	8,515	3.24	1	New
Oldenburg Farmers' Party (Christian-National Peasants' and Farmers' Party)	5,404	2.06	1	0
Reich Party of the German Middle Class	4,275	1.63	0	New
Christian Social People's Service	2,946	1.12	0	New
Independent Social Democratic Party of Germany	224	0.09	0	New
Total	262,683	100.00	48	0
Valid votes	262,683	99.31		
Invalid/blank votes	1,830	0.69		
Total votes	264,513	100.00		
Registered voters/turnout	353,167	74.90		
Source: Elections in the Weimar Republic, Elections in Germany

== 1932 ==
The 1932 Oldenburg state election was held on 29 May 1932 to elect the 46 members of the Landtag.

1932 Oldenburg Landtag election
Party	Votes	%	Seats	+/–
Nazi Party	131,543	48.38	24	+5
Social Democratic Party of Germany	50,994	18.75	9	−2
Centre Party	42,143	15.50	7	−2
German National People's Party	15,651	5.76	2	0
Communist Party of Germany	15,596	5.74	2	−1
German State Party	6,227	2.29	1	0
Oldenburg Farmers' Party (Christian-National Peasants' and Farmers' Party)	5,988	2.20	1	0
National Association (DVP–WP)	2,310	0.85	0	New
Socialist Workers' Party of Germany	1,469	0.54	0	New
Total	271,921	100.00	46	−2
Valid votes	271,921	99.22		
Invalid/blank votes	2,124	0.78		
Total votes	274,045	100.00		
Registered voters/turnout	362,616	75.57		
Source: Elections in the Weimar Republic, Elections in Germany
