= Grand Duchy of Oldenburg =

German state (1815–1918)

Grand Duchy of Oldenburg Großherzogtum Oldenburg (German)
- 1815–1918
- Top: Flag (1815–1871); Bottom: Flag (1871–1918) Coat of arms
- Anthem: Heil dir, o Oldenburg ("Hail thee, o Oldenburg")

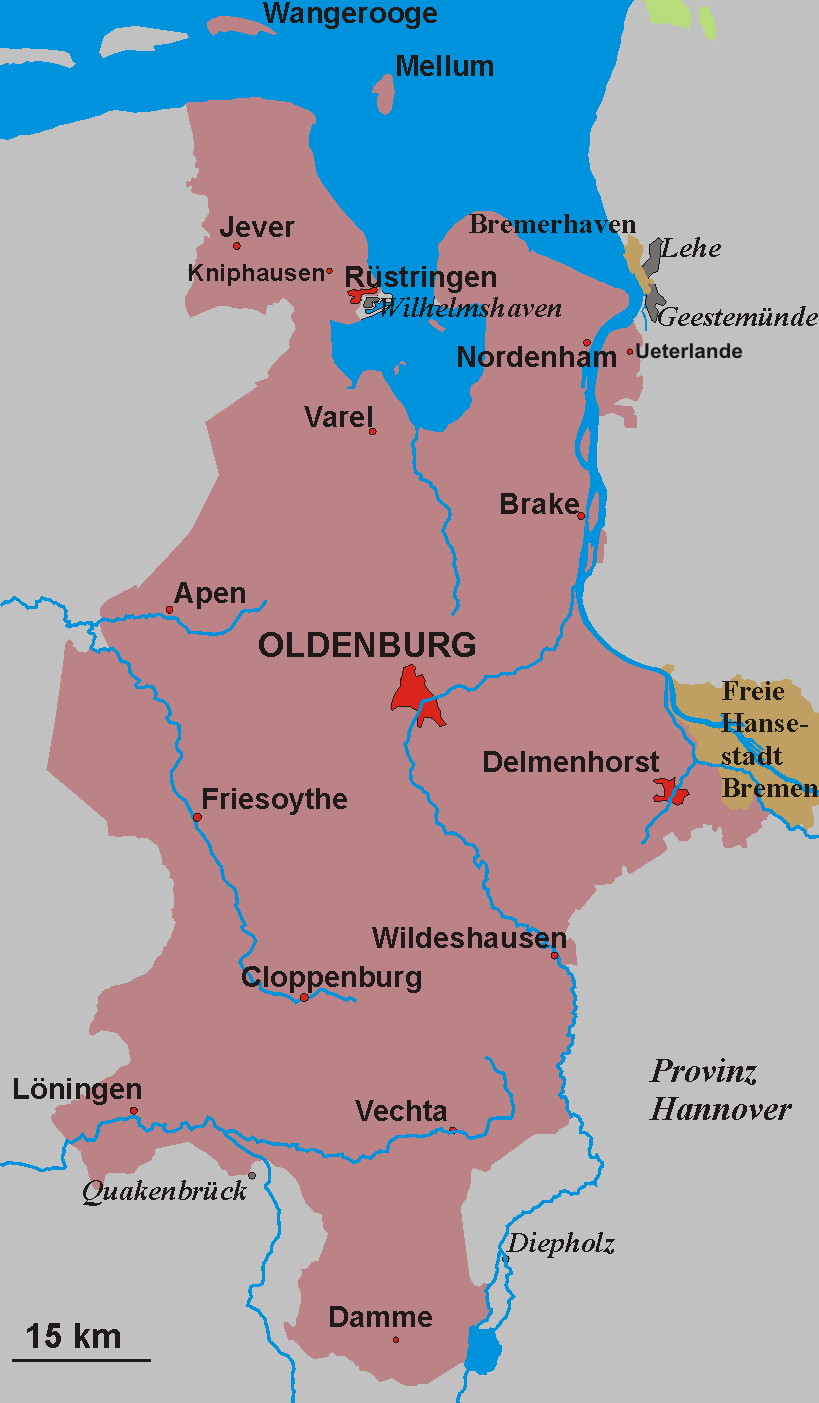
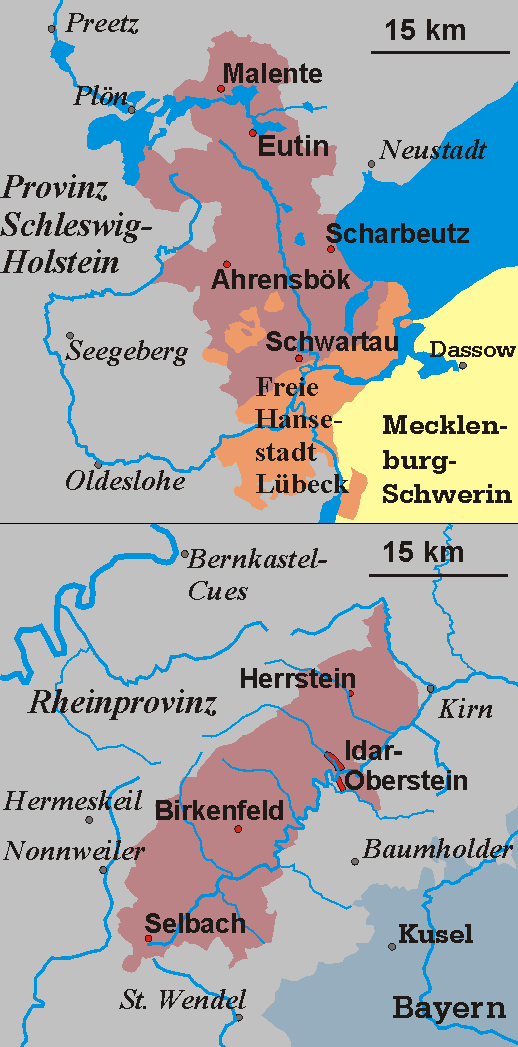
- Status: State of the German Confederation (1815–1848); State of the German Empire (1848–1849); independent state (1849–1850); State of the German Confederation (1850–1866); State of the North German Confederation (1867–1871); Federal State of the German Empire (1871–1918)
- Capital: Oldenburg
- Religion: Evangelical Lutheran Church of Oldenburg
- Government: Absolute monarchy (1815–1849); Constitutional monarchy (1849–1918)
- Grand Duke
  - 1815–1823: William I
  - 1823–1829: Peter I
  - 1829–1853: Augustus
  - 1853–1900: Peter II
  - 1900–1918: Frederick Augustus II
- Staatsminister
  - 1814–1842: Karl von Brandenstein (first)
  - 1916–1918: Franz Friedrich Ruhstrat (last)
- History
  - Congress of Vienna: 1815
  - Proclamation of the German Empire: January 18, 1871
  - German Revolution: November 9, 1918
- Currency: Thaler (until 1858); Vereinsthaler (1858–1873); German Goldmark (1873–1914); German Papiermark (1914–1918)
Preceded by	Succeeded by
First French Empire; Duchy of Oldenburg	Free State of Oldenburg
- Today part of: Germany

The Grand Duchy of Oldenburg (German: Großherzogtum Oldenburg, also known as Holstein-Oldenburg) was a grand duchy within the German Confederation, North German Confederation and German Empire, that consisted of three widely separated territories: Oldenburg, Eutin and Birkenfeld. It ranked tenth among the German states, had one vote in the Bundesrat, and three members in the Reichstag. Its ruling family, the House of Oldenburg, also came to rule in Denmark, Norway, Sweden, Greece, Russia and United Kingdom.

== History ==
The Grand Duchy of Oldenburg came into existence in 1815 combining the territory of the old Duchy of Oldenburg with the Principality of Birkenfeld. Whilst Oldenburg was elevated to a grand duchy at the Congress of Vienna, the first two grand dukes continued to style themselves as merely dukes and it was not until 1829 that the newly acceded Augustus used the title of grand duke. Although paternalist, the early grand dukes did not grant a constitution until events overtook them in 1848.

=== The European Revolutions ===
Oldenburg did not entirely escape from the Revolutions of 1848 that swept across Europe, but no serious disturbances took place therein. In 1849 Augustus granted a constitution of a very liberal character to his subjects. Hitherto his country had been ruled in the spirit of enlightened despotism which had been strengthened by the absence of a privileged class of nobles, the comparative independence of the peasantry, and the importance of the towns; thus a certain amount of friction was inevitable. In 1852 some modifications were introduced into the constitution, yet it remained one of the most progressive in the German Confederation. Important alterations were made in the administrative system in 1855 and again in 1868, and government oversight on church affairs was ordered by a law of 1863. In 1863, Peter II, who had ruled since the death of his father Augustus in 1853, seemed inclined to press a claim to the vacant Duchy of Schleswig and Duchy of Holstein, but ultimately in 1867 he abandoned this in favor of the Kingdom of Prussia and received some slight compensation. In 1866 he had sided with Prussia against the Austrian Empire during the Seven Weeks War and joined the North German Confederation. In 1871 the grand duchy became a state of the German Empire.

Oldenburg remained a monarchy until the German Revolution of 1918-1919, when the last grand duke, Frederick Augustus II, abdicated and Oldenburg became a constituent state of the Weimar Republic as the Free State of Oldenburg.

== Gallery ==
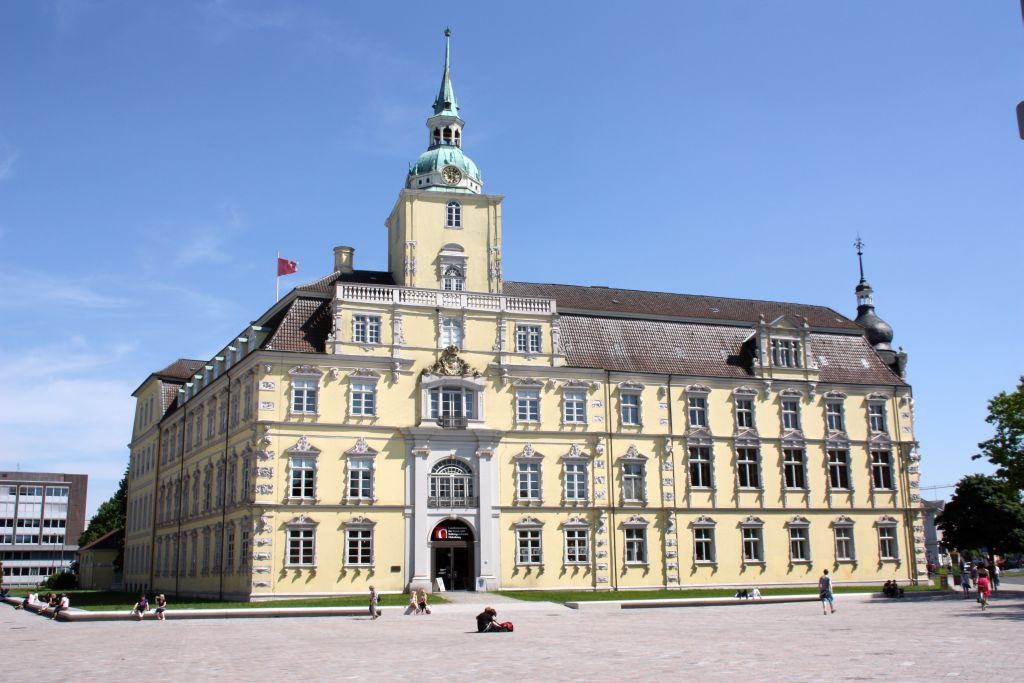
Oldenburg Castle

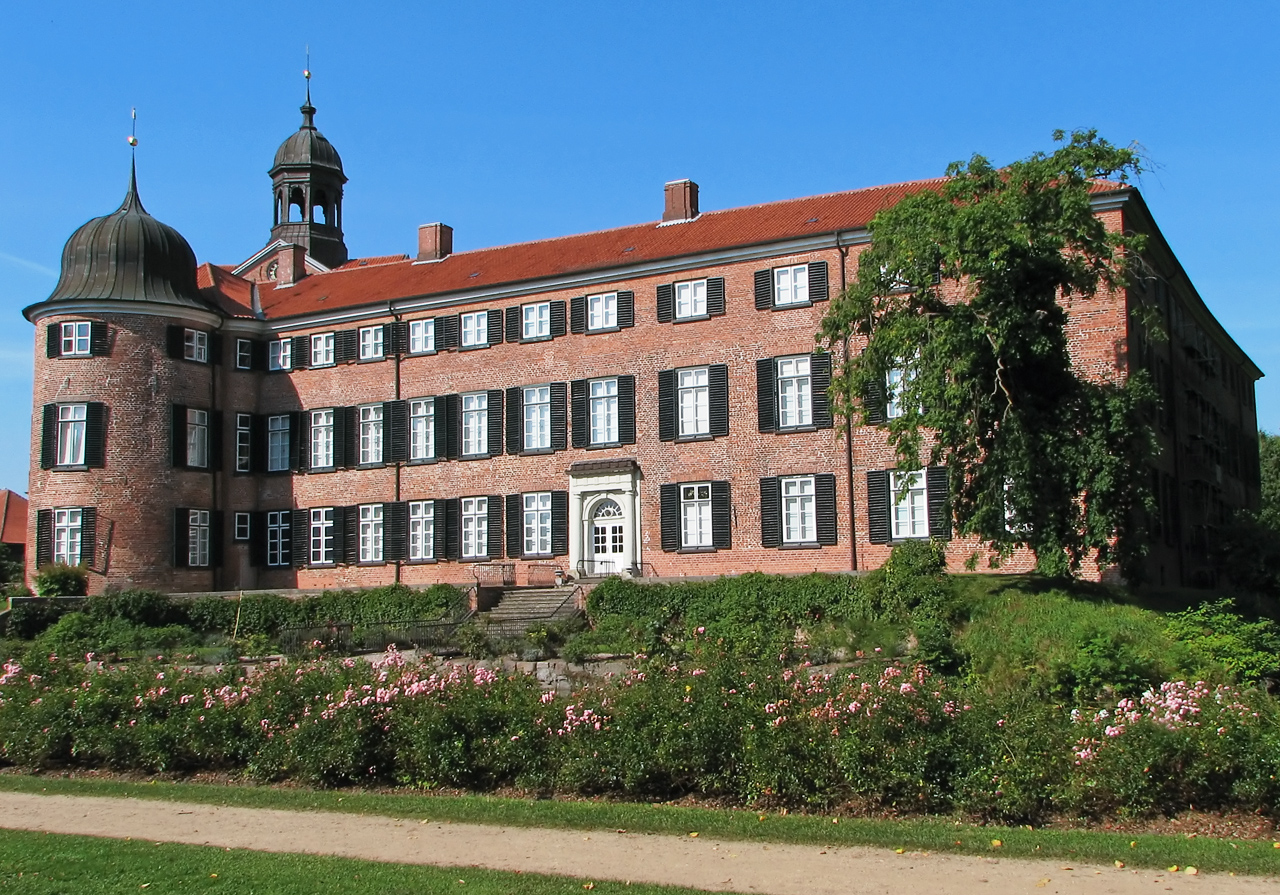
Eutin Castle

Heraldic shield of the Grand Dukes

== See also ==
- Counts, dukes and grand dukes of Oldenburg
