= Heil dir, o Oldenburg =

Anthem of Oldenburg

- by Cecilia of Sweden
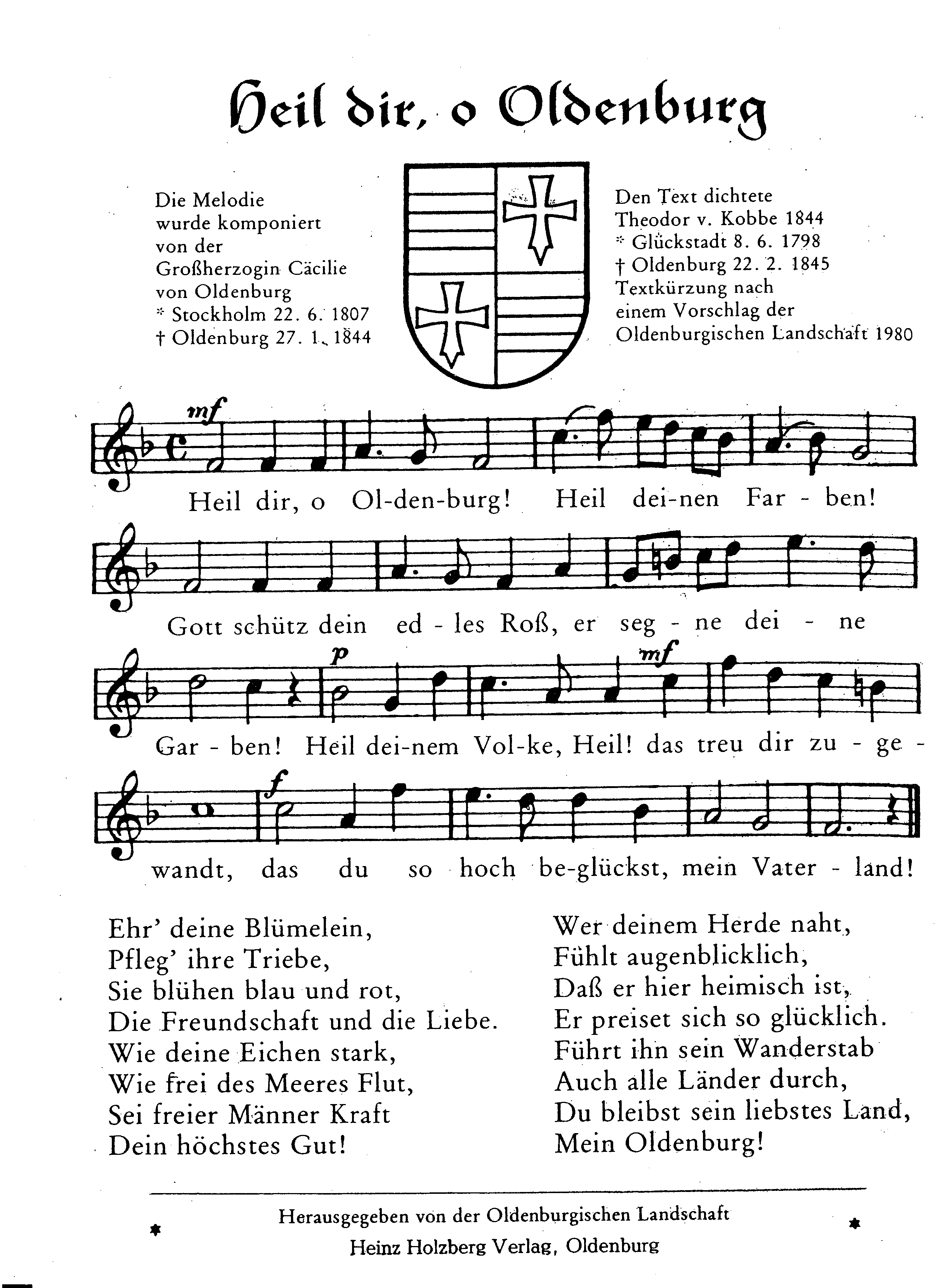
- Sheet music and lyrics and of the first, second, and fourth (modern) verses
- English: Hail thee, o Oldenburg
- Year: 1835 (music); 1844 (text)
- Text: Theodor von Kobbe

"Heil dir, o Oldenburg" (German: [ˈhaɪ̯l ˈdiːɐ̯ ˈoː ˈɔldn̩bʊrk]; lit. 'Hail thee, o Oldenburg'), is the city anthem of the City of Oldenburg, and in the past was the national anthem of the Grand Duchy, and after 1918, the Free State of Oldenburg.

== History ==
The Grand Duchess Cecilia of Sweden composed the melody in 1835. Theodor von Kobbe later wrote the original four-verse version in 1844, and it was adopted soon after. (Note: No source as to when it was formally adopted.) In contrast to most regional anthems of the time, it praised the country itself rather than the ruling house, save for the third line of the first verse, which was changed multiple times.

After the abolition of the monarchy, parts in praise to the former Grand Dukes were changed to reference the people. This version was used by the Free State of Oldenburg until it merged with the new state (Land) of Lower Saxony. It remains in use by the City of Oldenburg for events and such, though it is most commonly sung in a shortened three-verse version, omitting the third stanza.

== Lyrics ==
=== von Kobbe's version ===
Heil dir, o Oldenburg, Heil deinen Farben!
Gott schütz' Dein edles Roß, er segne deine Garben,
Heil deinem Fürsten, (Note: Führer or Volke in some versions) Heil, der treu dir zugewandt,
Der dich so gern beglückt, o Vaterland!

Ehr' deine Blümelein, pfleg' ihre Triebe,
Blau und Roth blühen sie, die Freundschaft wie die Liebe;
Wie deine Eichen stark, wie frei des Meeres Fluth,
Sei deutscher Männer Kraft Dein höchstes Gut.

Muthig Dein Wimpel fleucht durch alle Meere,
Wohin Dein Krieger zeucht, zollt man ihm Ruhm und Ehre;
Schleudert den fremden Kiel der Sturm an Deinen Strand,
Birgt ihn der Lootsen Schaar mit treuer Hand.

Wer Deinem Herde naht, fühlt augenblicklich,
Daß er hier heimisch ist, er preiset sich so glücklich;
Führt ihn sein Wanderstab durch alle Länder durch,
Du bleibst sein liebstes Land, mein Oldenburg!

Translation:

Hail to thee, O Oldenburg, hail thy colors!
God protect thy noble steed, he bless thy sheaves,
Hail to your prince, hail, who is faithful to you,
Who so gladly makes you happy, O fatherland!

Honor thy little flowers, tend their shoots,
Blue and red they bloom, friendship and love;
As strong as your oaks, as free as the sea's flood,
Be German men's strength your highest good.

Courageous your pennant flies through all seas,
Wherever your warrior goes, glory and honor are paid to him;
If the storm hurls the foreign keel on your beach,
The pilot's crew with faithful hand shall save him.

He who approaches thy flock feels at once,
That he is at home here, he praises himself so happily;
His wandering staff leads him through all lands,
You remain his favorite land, my Oldenburg!

Some verses focusing more heavily on the royals were later written:

=== Wilhelm Geiler's verse ===
Written by poet Wilhelm Geiler from Westerstede in 1872:

Heil, deinem Fürsten, Heil!
Er half bei Zeiten,
Das herrlich große Werk,
Das Deutsche Reich bereiten,
Als er zum blut'gen Strauß
Mit Preußen sich verband.
Hoch unser Fürstenhaus!
Hoch Vaterland!

Translation:

Hail, your prince, hail!
He helped at times when
The gloriously great work,
Prepare the German Reich,
When he went to the bloody bouquet
Allied with Prussia.
Long live our princely house!
Long live the fatherland!

=== Further changes ===
After the collapse of the German Empire in 1918, though prior to Hitler becoming chancellor in 1933, the line heil deinem fürsten (hail your prince, used instead of Großherzog for Grand duke) was changed to heil deinem Führer (hail your leader). In 1980, this was changed by the Oldenburg Landschaft (a regional organisation to preserve cultural heritage) to heil deinem Volke (hail your people).

In 2015, the Oldenburg Landschaft changed the line Deutscher Männer Kraft (German men's strength) to Deutscher Menschen Kraft (German People's strength).

== Melody ==
Source
