= Gau Weser-Ems =

Administrative division of Nazi Germany

Coordinates: 53.03°N 8°E

- Gau of Nazi Germany
- 1928–1945
- Flag

- Capital: Oldenburg
- Government
- Gauleiter
  - 1928–1942: Carl Röver
  - 1942–1945: Paul Wegener
- History
  - Establishment: 1 October 1928
  - Disestablishment: 8 May 1945
Preceded by
Free State of Oldenburg
Bremen (state)
Province of Hanover
Succeeded by
Lower Saxony
Bremen (state)
- Today part of: Germany

The Gau Weser-Ems, formed on 1 October 1928, was an administrative division of Nazi Germany from 1933 to 1945 in the core part of the Free State of Oldenburg, the state of Bremen and the western parts of the Prussian Province of Hanover. Before that, from 1928 to 1933, it was the regional subdivision of the Nazi Party in that area.

== History ==
The Nazi Gau (plural Gaue) system was originally established in a party conference on 22 May 1926, in order to improve administration of the party structure. From 1933 onwards, after the Nazi seizure of power, the Gaue increasingly replaced the German states as administrative subdivisions in Germany.

At the head of each Gau stood a Gauleiter, a position which became increasingly more powerful, especially after the outbreak of the Second World War, with little interference from above. Local Gauleiters often held government positions as well as party ones and were in charge of, among other things, propaganda and surveillance and, from September 1944 onward, the Volkssturm and the defense of the Gau.

The position of Gauleiter in Weser-Ems was held by Carl Röver from 1 October 1928 to his death on 15 May 1942, followed by Paul Wegener from 16 May 1942 to 8 May 1945. Röver, the original Gauleiter, was initially an early supporter of Adolf Hitler in the state of Oldenburg but lost in influence as the years progressed and died in hospital in Berlin under not fully established circumstances. Wegener, his successor, survived the war and died in 1993.

== Allied invasion and occupation ==
Near the end of World War II, the Gau was invaded by the western allies, who would gradually capture its territory until May 1945. The timeline of the allied advance is detailed in the table below.

Date of capture	Settlement	Reference
2 April 1945	Nordhorn	
3-5 April 1945	Lingen	
5 April 1945	Bathorn	
5 April 1945	Emlichheim	
5 April 1945	Neuenhaus	
6 April 1945	Schuttorf	
7 April 1945	Emsbüren	
8 April 1945	Meppen	
10 April 1945	Wippingen	
12 April 1945	Oberlangen	
12 April 1945	Wesuwe	
13 April 1945	Cloppenburg	
16 April 1945	Rhede	
18 April 1945	Bunde	
23 April 1945	Weener	
24 April 1945	Bingum	
26 April 1945	Ditzum	
26 April 1945	Pogum	
26 April 1945	Dyksterhusen	
27 April 1945	Bremen	
29 April 1945	Leer	
3 May 1945	Oldenburg	
4 May 1945	Norden	
5 May 1945	Südbrookmerland	
5 May 1945	Emden	
5 May 1945	Krummhörn	
8 May 1945	Norderney	
11 May 1945	Borkum	
11 May 1945	Juist	
