= Evangelical Lutheran Church in Oldenburg =

Protestant church in Germany

The Evangelical Lutheran Church in Oldenburg (German: Evangelisch-Lutherische Kirche in Oldenburg) is a Lutheran church in the German state of Lower Saxony.

Evangelical Lutheran Church in Oldenburg

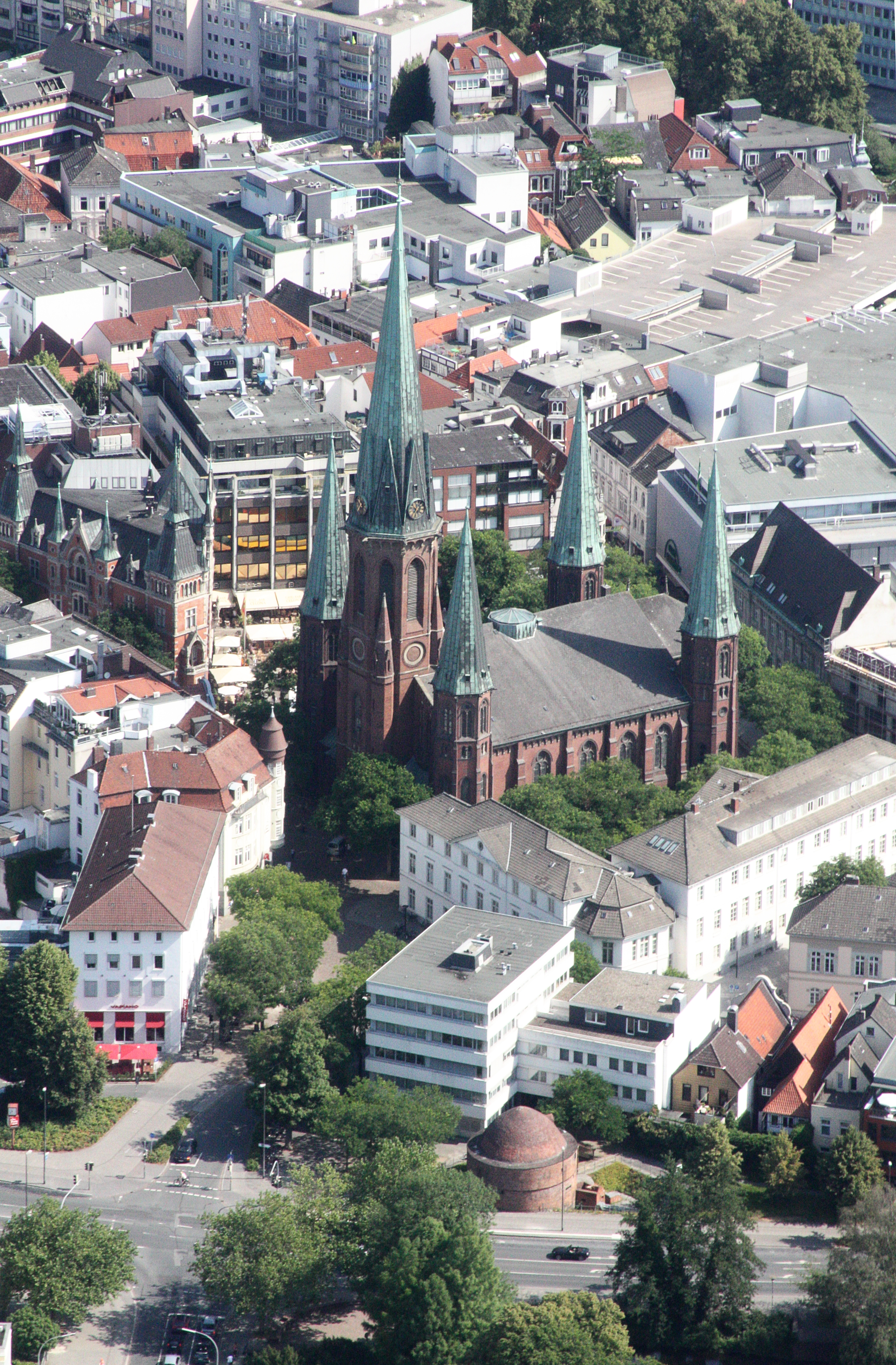
Lamberti Church in Oldenburg

The seat of the church leaders is in Oldenburg, as is the preaching venue of its bishop at St Lamberti Church. The Evangelical Lutheran Church in Oldenburg is a regional church (German: Landeskirche) and a full member of the Protestant Church in Germany (EKD). As one of just two regional churches in the EKD, the church is only a guest member of the United Evangelical Lutheran Church of Germany (VELKD) and the Union of Evangelical Churches (UEK). The church is also a full member of the Community of Protestant Churches in Europe and the Lutheran World Federation. The church has 337,863 members (2025) in 107 parishes, with approximately 260 pastors (men and women). It is the largest Protestant denomination in the area of the former state of Oldenburg.

== History ==
The Lutheran Reformation came to the County of Oldenburg beginning in 1527. Until the German Revolution in 1918, the church was a state church and the monarch was the acting bishop (summus episcopus, or supreme governor) of the church. In 1922 the Church in Oldenburg counted 291,000 parishioners.

== Practices ==
Ordination of women and blessing of same-sex marriages were allowed.

== Leadership of the church ==
The Evangelical Lutheran Church in Oldenburg has four leading authorities: the synod, the bishop, the superior church council (Oberkirchenrat), and the common church committee.

=== Synod ===
The synod is the highest leading authority in the Church. The election of the 60 members (two-thirds laypersons and one-third clerics) of the synod is for six years.

=== Leading persons and bishops in history ===
- 1893–1904: Martin Bernhard Schomann, president
- 1904–1920: Eugen von Finckh, president
- 1920–1934: Heinrich Tilemann, president
- 1934–1944: Johannes Volkers, bishop
- 1945–1952: Wilhelm Stählin, bishop
- 1952−1953: bishop crisis: Wilhelm Hahn was elected, but not inaugurated.
- 1954–1967: Gerhard Jacobi, bishop
- 1967–1985: Hans-Heinrich Harms, bishop
- 1985–1998: Wilhelm Sievers, bishop
- 1998–2008: Peter Krug, bishop
- 2008−2018: Jan Janssen, bishop
- 2018-today: Thomas Adomeit, bishop
