= St. Lambert's Church, Oldenburg =

Church in Oldenburg, Germany

Coordinates: 53°08′18″N 8°12′51″E

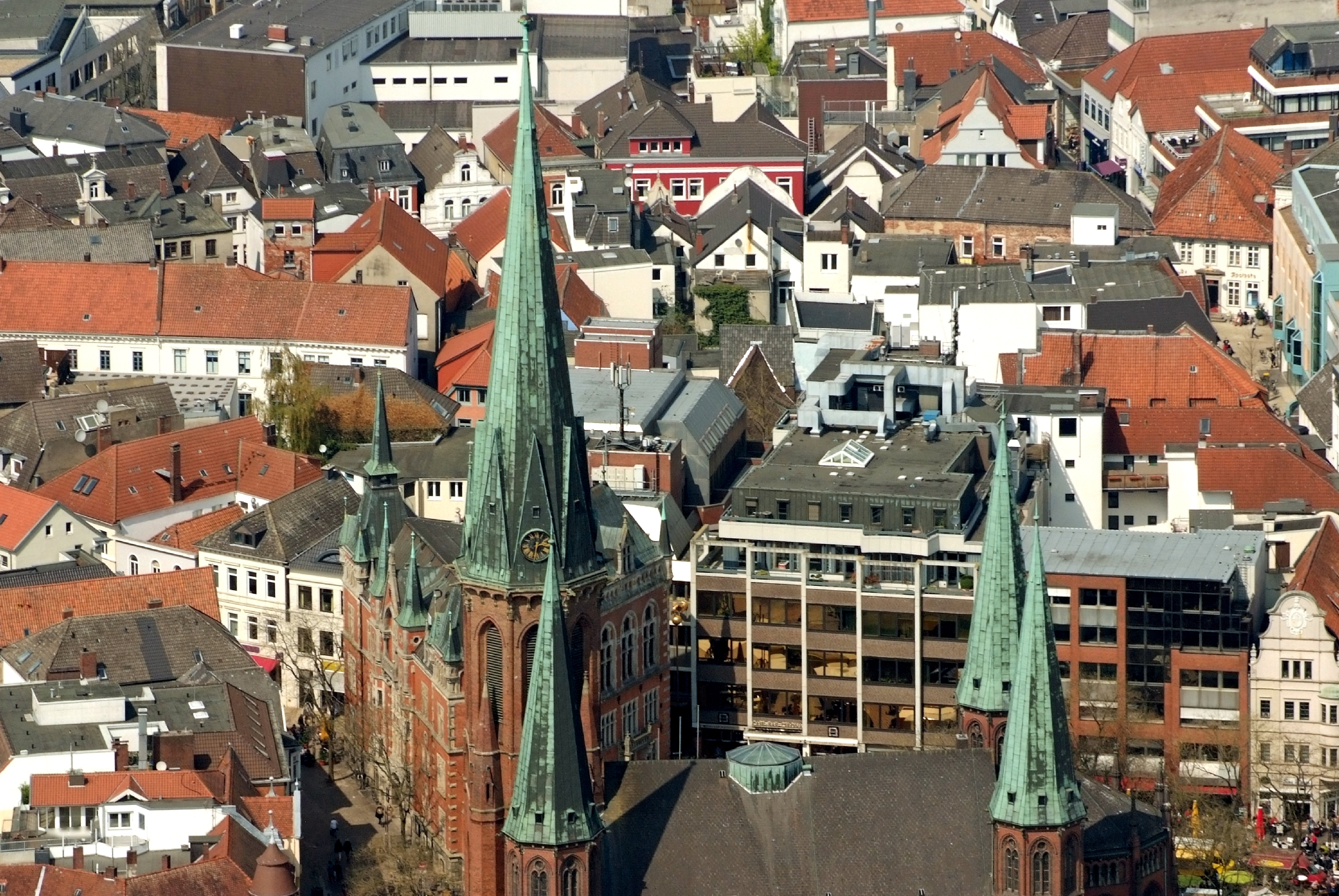
Aerial view of the St Lamberti Church in Oldenburg.

St. Lambert's Church (in German: St Lamberti-Kirche) is the main Evangelical Lutheran church in the centre of the city of Oldenburg, Lower Saxony, Germany.

== Overview ==
The church is named after Lambert of Maastricht. The church is the preaching venue of the bishop of the Evangelical Lutheran Church in Oldenburg.

The church dates from the 13th century and was renovated in the 19th century. It was originally built as a Romanesque hall between 1155 ad 1234. Subsequently, it was altered several times. The outside hides a rotunda-style basilica, based on the Pantheon in Rome.

To the north is the old Rathaus (city hall). To the southeast is Schloss Oldenburg.

== Gallery ==
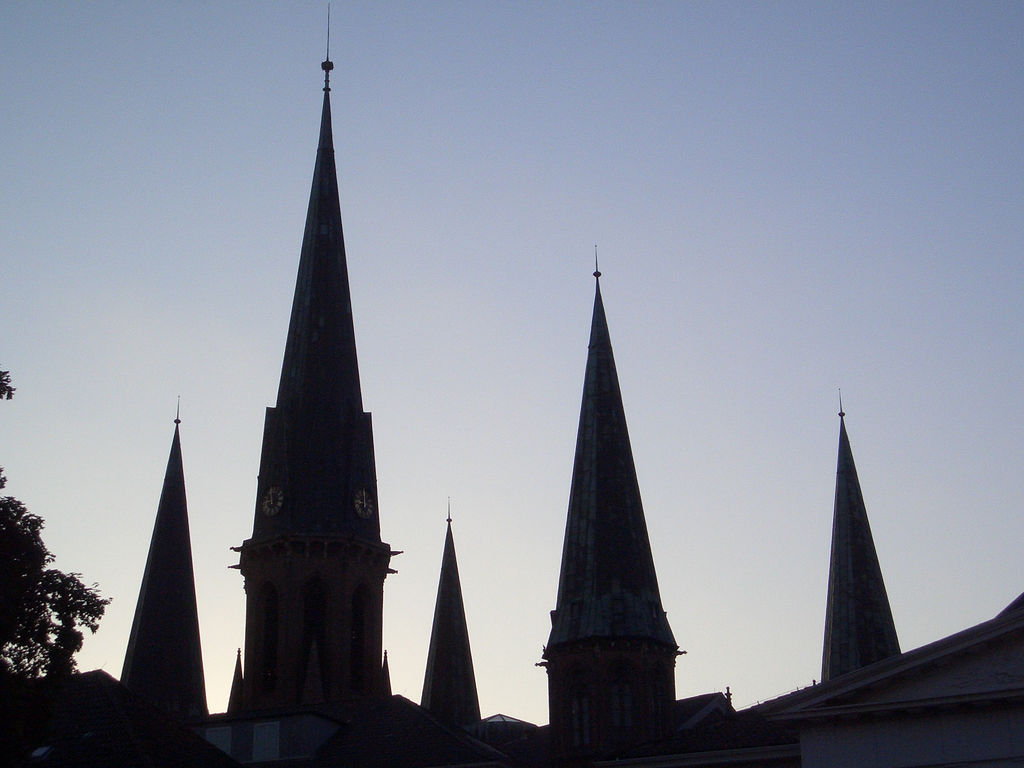
Towers and spires of the church.

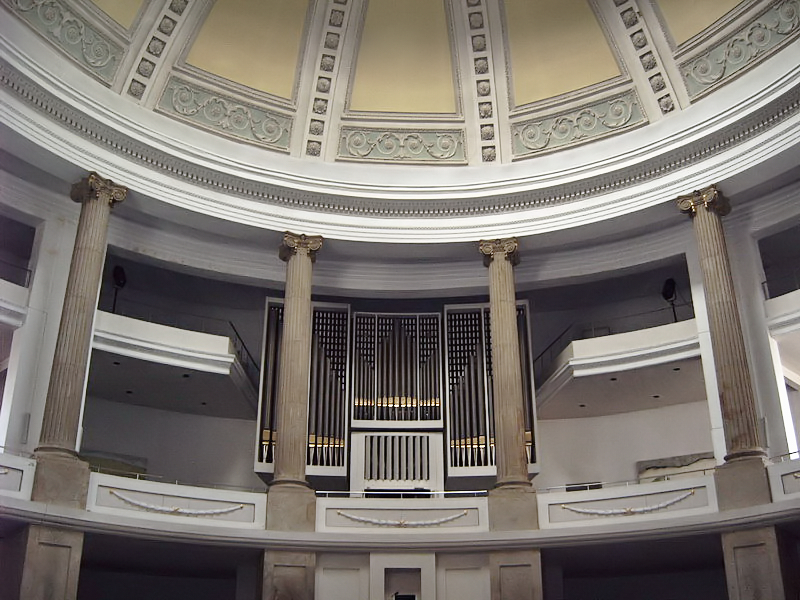
Internal view within the church.

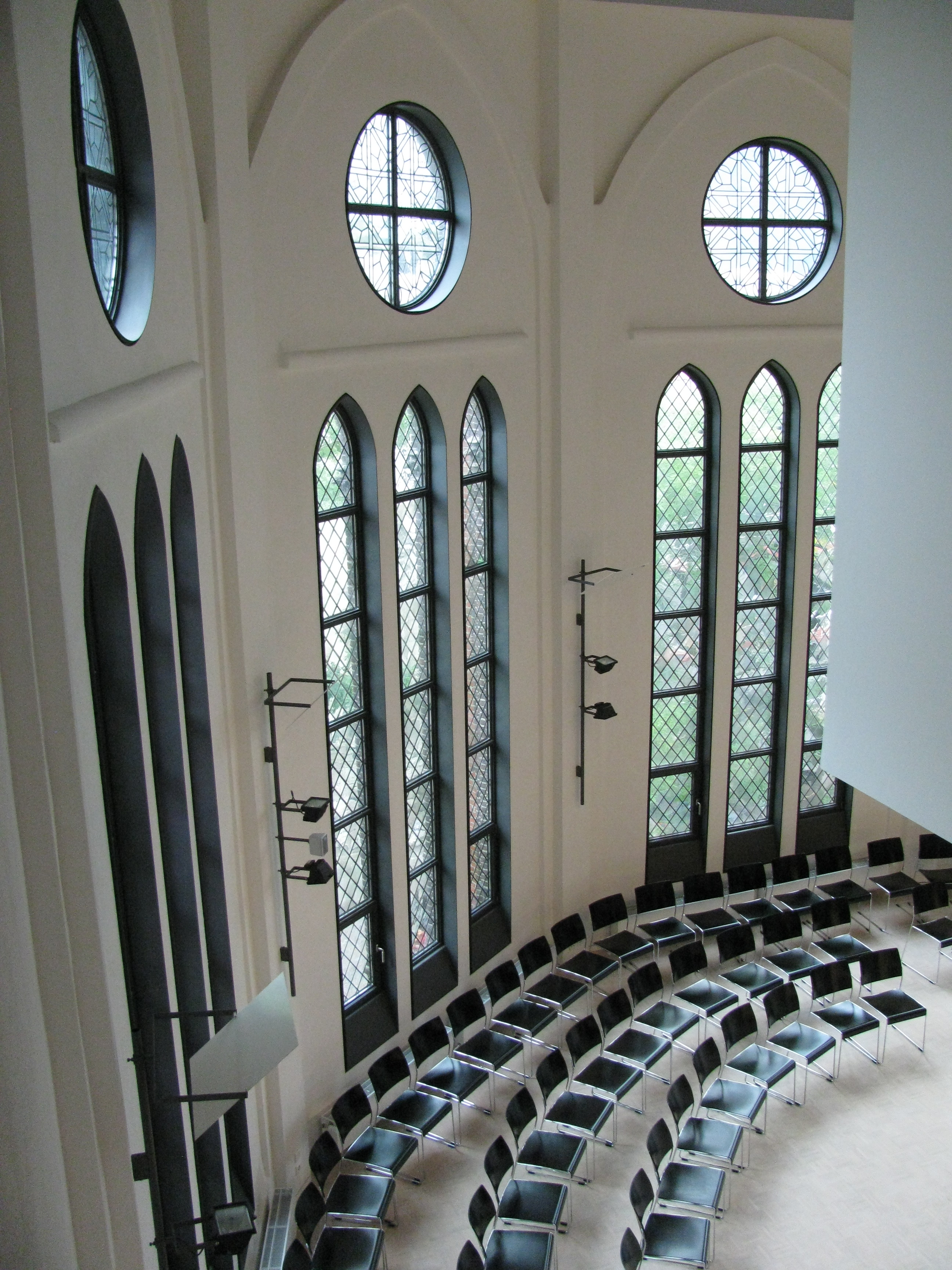
Internal view looking down inside the church.

== See also ==
- List of visitor attractions in Oldenburg
