= Free State of Oldenburg =

Federated German state 1918 to 1946

Free State of Oldenburg Freistaat Oldenburg
- State of Germany
- 1918–1946
- Flag Coat of arms

- The Free State of Oldenburg (red) within the Weimar Republic

Anthem
- Heil dir, o Oldenburg
- Capital: Oldenburg
- Area
  - Coordinates: 53°08′38″N 8°12′50″E
  - 1925: 6,427 km^{2} (2,481 sq mi)
- Population
  - 1925: 545,172
- Government
  - Type: Republic
- History
  - Established: 11 November 1918
  - Disestablished: 23 November 1946
Preceded by
Grand Duchy of Oldenburg
Succeeded by
Lower Saxony
Schleswig-Holstein
Rhineland-Palatinate
- Today part of: Germany

The Free State of Oldenburg (German: Freistaat Oldenburg) was a federated state of the Weimar Republic and Nazi Germany. It was established in 1918 during the German revolution following the abdication of Grand Duke Frederick Augustus II of the Grand Duchy of Oldenburg. The Allies of World War II abolished the Free State in 1946 as part of the reorganization of the German states. Its main territory, including the capital Oldenburg, became part of the West German state of Lower Saxony; its northern exclave was joined to Schleswig-Holstein and the southern exclave became part of Rhineland-Palatinate.

Oldenburg came relatively peacefully through the revolutionary period that followed World War I. An attempt to set up a soviet-style council republic failed when the existing government forestalled the move by quickly setting up an interim State Executive Committee after the Grand Duke abdicated. An elected constituent state assembly then wrote a republican constitution for the Free State of Oldenburg and approved it in June 1919.

Oldenburg's first government was a center-left coalition that lasted until 1923. After that, deadlocks in the Free State's parliament resulted in governments led by non-partisan technocrats until the Nazi Party won a majority in the 1932 election.

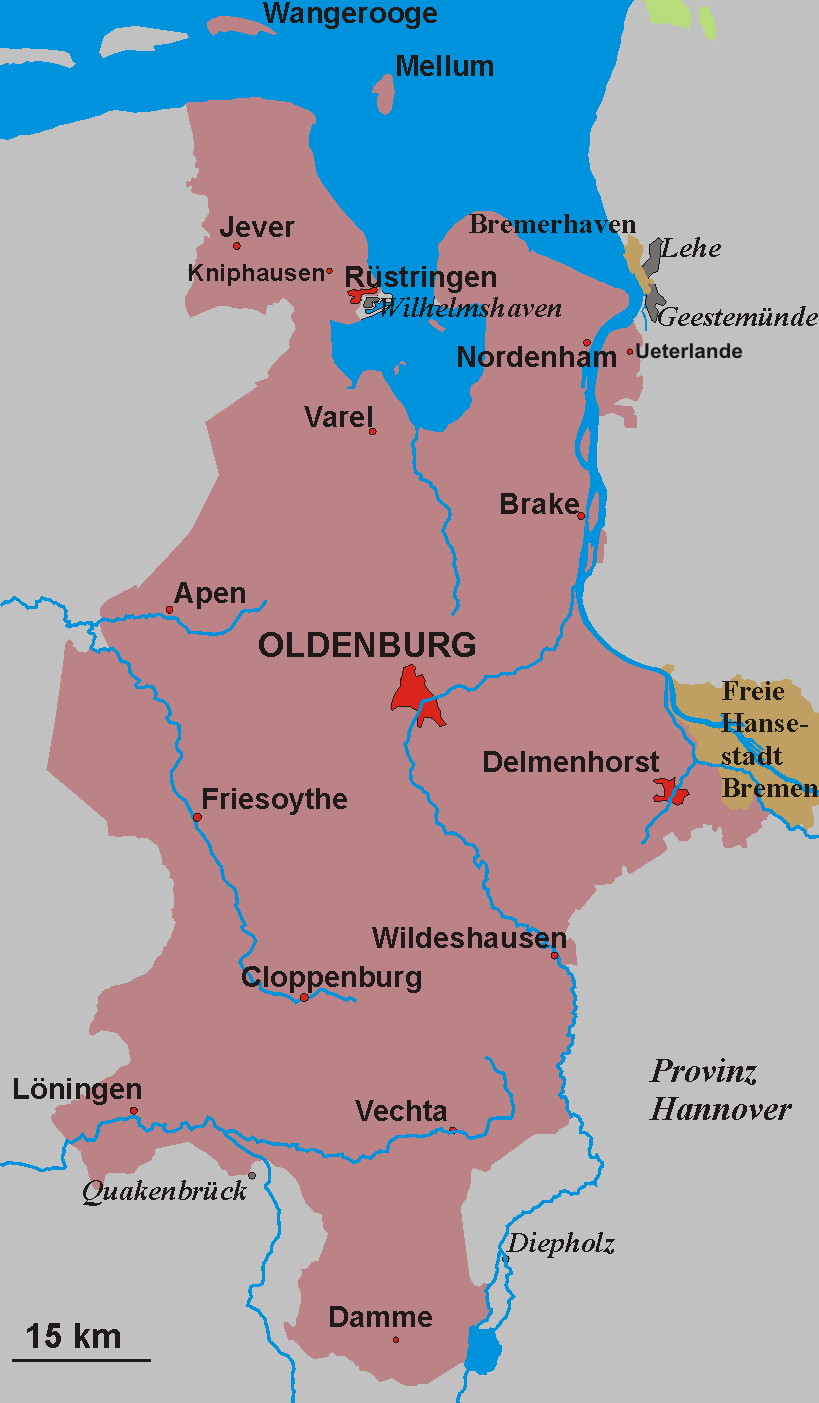
The Free State of Oldenburg's main region in northwest Germany

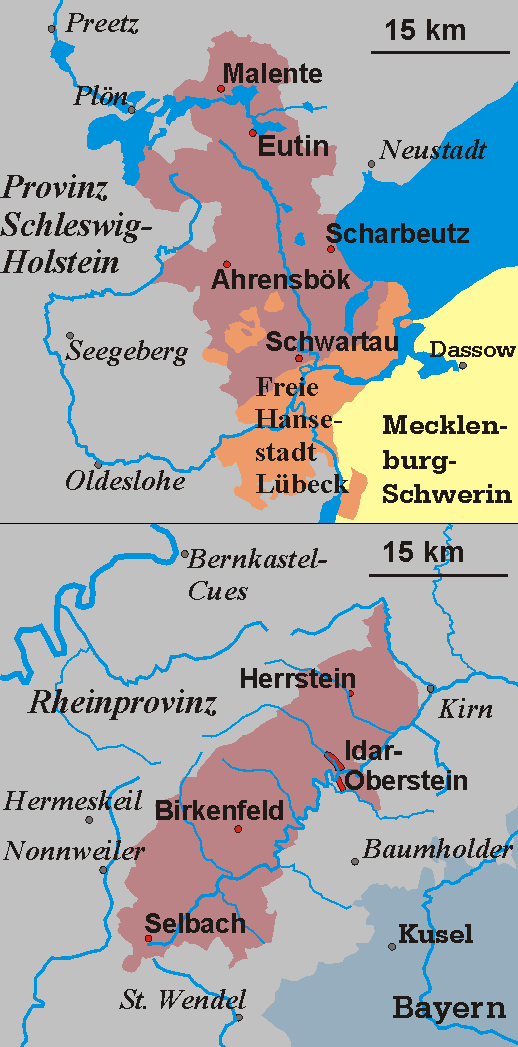
The Free State of Oldenburg's two exclaves, the Regions of Lübeck (top) and Birkenfeld (bottom)

== Geography ==
The Free State of Oldenburg inherited its geographical layout from its predecessor state, the Grand Duchy of Oldenburg (1815–1918), which was one of the 25 constituent states of the German Empire from 1871 to 1918. Oldenburg consisted of three widely separated territories:

- The main region covering 5,382 km^{2} (2,078 sq mi) was in northwest Germany bordering the North Sea and included its capital, Oldenburg. The naval port city of Wilhelmshaven was a coastal enclave that belonged to the Province of Hanover, which was part of the Free State of Prussia (the Kingdom of Prussia during the imperial period). Its population in 1925 was 442,029.
- The northern exclave, the Region of Lübeck (Landesteil Lübeck), was within the eastern part of the Prussian Province of Schleswig-Holstein on the Baltic Sea, with an area of 542 km^{2} (209 sq mi) and a 1925 population of 47,494.
- The southern exclave, the Region of Birkenfeld (Landesteil Birkenfeld) lay on the west side of the Rhine within the Rhine Province in far southwestern Prussia. It had an area of 503 km^{2} (194 sq mi) and a population of 55,649 in 1925.

== Establishment ==
=== Wilhelmshaven mutiny ===
Wilhelmshaven, even though it was part of the Prussian province of Hanover, played a significant role in the revolutionary developments in Oldenburg at the end of World War I. Wilhelmshaven was home to the German High Seas Fleet, which had seen little action during the war. Sailors as a result had become restive, and as the war drew towards an end, their anger grew over their poor food rations and treatment by officers. In late October 1918, when they became aware of plans by the navy's highest command to sail out for a final battle against the British Royal Navy, some either refused orders or sabotaged their ships' readiness. The plan to attack was scrapped, and the sailors who were taken into custody for their role in the action were sent to Kiel, where their mutiny flared again and spread to become the German revolution of 1918–1919.

=== Abdication of Grand Duke Frederick Augustus II ===
In response to the revolutionary developments, Oldenburg's single-chamber Landtag (parliament) met in extraordinary session on 5 November. The Social Democratic Party (SPD) and Progressive People's Party (FVP), which together held 26 of the 45 seats in the Landtag, demanded full parliamentarization of the Oldenburg government and that Grand Duke Frederick Augustus II (r. 1900–1918) give up his semi-absolutist rights. Later that day, Frederick Augustus offered to create a state parliamentary committee to discuss greater public participation in the government, but the Landtag rejected his proposal.

Sailors and dock workers in Wilhelmshaven formed a workers' and soldiers' council the next day and elected a Council of 21 headed by Seaman First Class (Obermatrose) Bernhard Kuhnt. On 7 November, a similar council was set up in Oldenburg. It demanded the Grand Duke's abdication, then led a demonstration march through the city. It freed political prisoners and disarmed both the guards at the ducal palace and the troops arriving at the train station who had been sent to quell the uprisings in Wilhelmshaven and Oldenburg.

In Wilhelmshaven on 9 November, the Council of 21 proclaimed the Council Republic (Räterepublik) of Oldenburg-East Friesland with Kuhnt as president. On 11 November, an SPD member of the Oldenburg Landtag, Paul Hug, who had been at Wilhelmshaven, told a government minister that armed soldiers and sailors would come to Oldenburg and drive the Grand Duke out of his palace. Frederick Augustus subsequently abdicated the throne but was able to keep his estates and other holdings.

=== Interim government ===
Hug then went to the Landtag and convinced members of the major parties that they had to act quickly to prevent the Wilhelmshaven revolutionaries from setting up a council republic. The Social Democrats, Progressive People's Party and Centre Party quickly established a State Executive Committee (Landesdirektorium) made up of two ministers from the Grand Duchy and representatives of the political parties. The Landtag confirmed the Executive Council and continued to act as Oldenburg's parliament. When Kuhnt arrived in Oldenburg on the afternoon of 11 November, he was confronted with an established interim government and let himself be named provisional president of the new Free State of Oldenburg, which was headed by the Executive Committee. The Oldenburg workers' and soldiers' council played no role in the change of government and quickly faded away.

=== Birkenfeld Republic ===
The southern exclave of Birkenfeld was occupied by French troops on 12 December 1918 as part of the occupation of the Rhineland that was required by the Armistice of 11 November 1918 and later by the Treaty of Versailles. On 14 July 1919, nine Birkenfelders led by Otto Baltes declared a Birkenfeld Republic independent of the Free State of Oldenburg. The French, who had an interest in an autonomous Rhenish Republic, almost certainly had foreknowledge of the declaration and did nothing to hinder it. Baltes and his supporters made it clear, however, that they wanted to remain part of Germany. Their attempts to either form an independent German republic or become part of the Prussian Rhine Province were blocked by opposition from both France and Germany and ended on 7 November 1919 with Birkenfeld remaining part of Oldenburg.

=== End of the revolution ===
In connection with the Spartacist uprising in Berlin, communists in Delmenhorst (southeast of the city of Oldenburg) attempted unsuccessfully to stage a coup on 9 January 1919. A similar uprising took place in the twin towns of Wilhelmshaven and Rüstringen (part of Oldenburg) on 27 January. It was put down the next day by troops loyal to the government in Berlin, and on 29 January Kuhnt was relieved of his post as president of Oldenburg. Four weeks later, on 21 February, government troops again entered Wilhelmshaven and Rüstringen and abolished the Council of 21. Kuhnt was arrested on 28 February and ousted as president of the Executive Committee.

The election for the constituent state assembly, which was responsible for writing a constitution for the Free State of Oldenburg, was held on 23 February 1919 (9 March 1919 in Birkenfeld). It approved the constitution it had drafted on 17 June. The new Free State of Oldenburg had a single-chamber Landtag elected for a term of three years by universal suffrage. The state administration, headed by a minister-president elected by the Landtag, was responsible to it and could be removed by a vote of no confidence. There were provisions for popular referendums.

== Weimar Republic era ==
Oldenburg's first minister-president, Theodor Tantzen of the liberal German Democratic Party (DDP), took office on 21 June 1919 heading a ministry made up of the parties of the Weimar Coalition (the SPD, Centre Party and DDP). It lasted until 17 April 1923. After that point, political stalemates in the Landtag that kept the parties of both the Left and the Right from forming a stable parliamentary coalition resulted in state governments that were headed by non-partisan technocrats until 16 June 1932. The last two governments were run by the Nazi Party.

Landtag election results by seats
Party	1919	1920	1923/24	1925	1928	1931	1932	1933 (Note: Restructuring of the Landtag on the basis of the Reichstag election of 5 March 1933)
Social Democratic Party (SPD)	16	13	12	9	15	11	9	7
Independent Social Democratic Party (USPD)	16	5	–	.	.	–	.	.
German Democratic Party (DDP)	15	6	9	5	5	1	1	–
DDP & DVP	.	3	.	.	.	.	.	.
Centre Party	11	10	10	10	9	9	7	5
German People's Party (DVP)	5	8	12	15	9	2	–	–
DVP & DVNP	.	2	.	15	9	.	.	.
German National People's Party (DNVP)	1	–	3	15	9	2	2	4
Economic Party (WP)	.	.	.	.	2	–	.	.
Landbund	.	1	.	.	3	1	1	.
Communist Party (KPD)	.	–	2	–	1	3	2	[2] (Note: The Nazi Party excluded the KPD members following the reconfiguration of the Landtag which took place after the 5 March 1933 Reichstag election.)
Nazi Party (NSDAP)	.	.	.	1	3	19	24	18
DVFP	.	.	.	1	1	.	.	.
Totals	48	48	48	40	48	48	46	[34] (Note: Excluding the 2 KPD members who were not seated)

Notes:

In the late 1920s, Oldenburg was involved in a northern German peasants' movement that was sparked by a shortage of capital, poor harvests and falling pork prices. Initially limited to tax boycotts and resistance to forced auctions, it was radicalized by agitators from Schleswig-Holstein, where the movement was centered, and by the Nazi Party, which saw a chance to bring the disaffected farmers into their fold. On 26 January 1928, a protest with an estimated 40,000 participants gathered at Oldenburg's horse market. The following year, on 3 June, a member of the movement from Schleswig-Holstein bombed the state finance office in Oldenburg without causing any deaths or injuries. The Nazi Party, in whose local rise the peasants had taken part, put an end to the movement after coming to power.

== Nazi rise to power ==
From 1925 to 1927, following Bavaria's lead, Oldenburg was one of many German states that banned Adolf Hitler's participation in public meetings. In the May 1931 Landtag election, the Nazi Party became the largest party with 37% of the vote, and in the May 1932 election, it captured a majority of the Landtag seats for the first time in any German state. When Carl Röver, Nazi Party Gauleiter of Gau Weser-Ems, which included Oldenburg, was elected minister-president on 16 June 1932, Oldenburg became one of only five states to have installed a Nazi-led government before the Nazis came to power nationally.

Following their seizure of power at the national level, the Nazi government enacted the Second Law on the Coordination of the States with the Reich that established more direct control over the states by means of the new powerful position of Reichsstatthalter (Reich Governor). Röver was installed in the post for both Oldenburg and Bremen on 5 May 1933 and was succeeded as minister-president by Georg Joel. When Röver died on 15 May 1942, Paul Wegener became Reichsstatthalter.

== Territorial changes ==
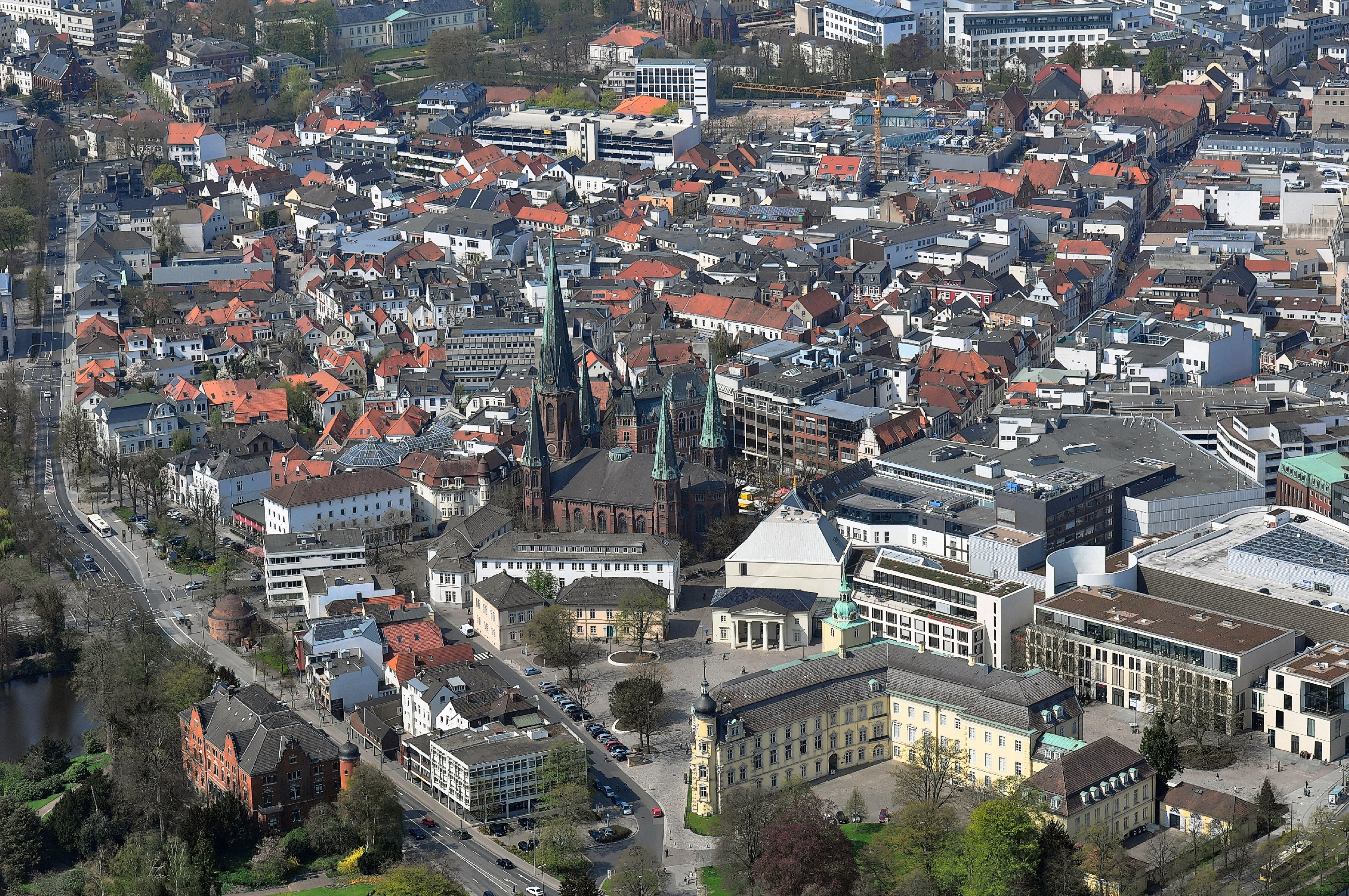
City center of Oldenburg showing the Oldenburg Palace lower right. About 1.4% of the city was destroyed by Allied bombing during World War II.

As a result of the Greater Hamburg Act of 1 April 1937, Oldenburg lost both of its exclave districts to Prussia and gained the City of Wilhelmshaven in return. As a result of the territorial changes, Oldenburg had an area of 5,375 km^{2} (2,075 sq mi) and 580,000 inhabitants at the beginning of World War II in 1939.

After the war, Oldenburg was part of the British occupation zone. It lost its status as a separate German state when it was merged into the newly founded state of Lower Saxony as the administrative region (Verwaltungsbezirk) of Oldenburg, and became a part of West Germany upon its establishment in May 1949. The Region of Lübeck became part of the state of Schleswig-Holstein and Birkenfeld of Rhineland-Palatinate, both also in West Germany.

== Leaders ==
=== Minister-Presidents ===
- 1918–1919 Bernhard Kuhnt (USPD)
- 1919–1923 Theodor Tantzen (DDP)
- 1923–1930 Eugen von Finckh (non-partisan)
- 1930–1932 Friedrich Cassebohm (non-partisan)
- 1932–1933 Carl Röver (NSDAP)
- 1933–1945 Georg Joel (NSDAP)
- 1945–1946 Theodor Tantzen (FDP)

=== Reichsstatthalter ===
- 1933–1942 Carl Röver (NSDAP)
- 1942–1945 Georg Joel (NSDAP)

== See also ==
- Duchy of Oldenburg
- Oldenburg (state)
- Oldenburg Landtag elections in the Weimar Republic
- Rulers of Oldenburg
