= Orebygaard =

Manor house and estate located on Lolland in southeastern Denmark

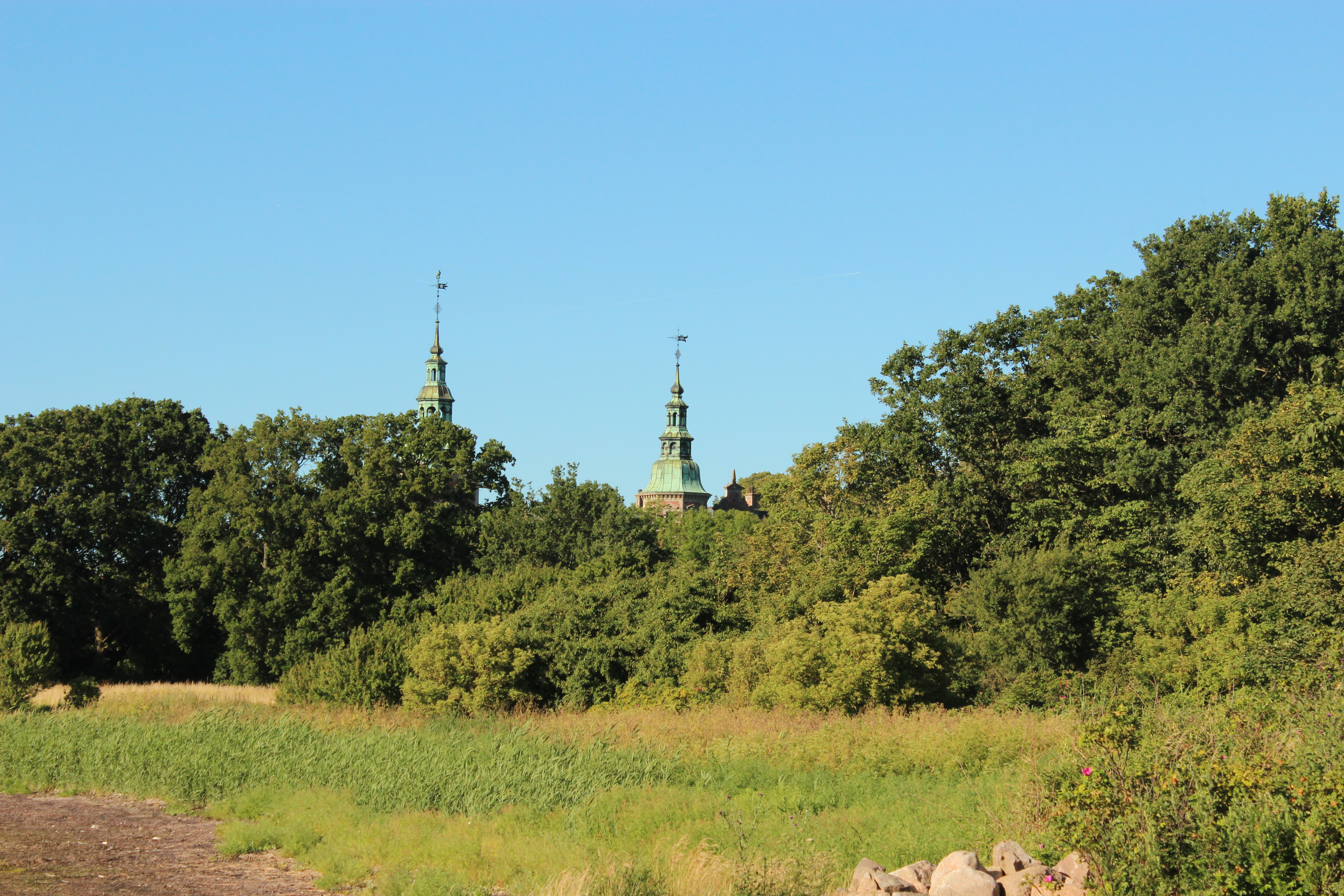

General information
- Architectural style: Renaissance Revival
- Location: Orebygaard 5, 4990 Sakskøbing, Denmark
- Coordinates: 54°49′45″N 11°35′47″E
- Completed: 1874

Orebygaard is a manor house and estate located on Lolland in southeastern Denmark. The current main building, a Neo-Renaissance style building with two towers, is from 1872 to 1874. It was listed on the Danish registry of protected buildings and places in 1985.

The main building and park was acquired by the Hong Kong-based Danish businessman Hans Michael Jebsen in 2001.

== History ==
=== Early history ===
In the 13th century Orebygaard belonged to the crown, It seems to have played an important role in the defence of the coast against the Vens. The first known private owner was Sivert Lauridsen, a nobleman, who owned the estate from 1315 to 1316.

Some sources mention Erik Sjællandsfar, possibly an illegitimate son of Christopher II or Erik Menved, but this is contested by other sources. According to the first-mentioned sources, Sjællandsfar's daughter Bodil Eriksdatter brought it into her marriage with Laurids Jensen Blaa. Their sons, Sivert and Oluf Lauridsen Blaa, divided the estate in two. This lasted until the beginning of the 16th century when Mads Eriksen Bølle obtained full ownership of the estate. Bølle supported Christian II during the Count's Feud and his estate was on several occasions looted by citizens from Sakskøbing. His grand daughter, Birgitte Bølle, brought Orebygaard into her marriage with Christoffer Gøye, a son of Mogens Gøye. They were major landowners but had no children. Orebygaard was therefore passed on to one of Birgitte Bølle's more distant relatives, Axel Ottesen Brahe. whose son sold it to Jakob Ulfeldt in 1618. It was then owned by members of the Ulfeldt family until Sophie Ulfeldt brought it into the Holck family through her marriage to Christian Christopher Holck.

=== Lehn family ===
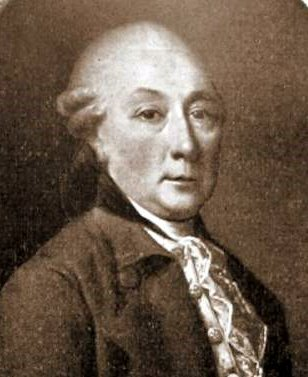
Poul Abraham Lehn

In 1775, Orebygaard was sold in auction to Poul Abraham Lehn. He was already the owner of Berritzgaard and Højbygård on Lolland and Hvidkilde, Nielstrup and Lindskov on Funen. In 1784, he also acquired Lungholm on Lolland. He was a son of the wealthy Copenhagen-based wine merchant Abraham Lehn.

Orebygaard and Berritsgaard were in 1784 merged into a barony under the name Guldborgland. In 1803, Højbygaard and Lungholm were converted into a stamhus under the name Sønderkarle.

=== Rosenørn-Lehn family ===
When Poul Abraham Lehn died in 1804, Guldborgland was passed on to his grand daughter Christiane Henriette von Barner. She married Otto Ditlev baron Kaas-Lehn on 1 September that same year, but he died in 1811. In 1820, she was married for a second time to Henrik Christian Rosenørn. Henrik Christian Rosenørn was shortly thereafter created friherre under the name Rosenørn-Lehn. Christiane Henriette von Barner took over the management of the estates after her husband's death in 1847. The baronies of Guldborgland waspassed on to her eldest son Otto Ditlev Rosenørn-Lehn When she died in 1860. It was as a result of the lensafløsningsloven of 1919 dissolved with effect from 1922.

== Architecture ==
Hans van Steenwinckel the Elder constructed a new main building for Birgitte Bølle in 1578 to 1587. It was a one-winged, two-storey brick building with a tower in each end. In 1638, it was expanded with a chapel to the southwest. Christiane Henriette von Barners modernized the main building in 1813 to 1815 with assistance of J. Chr. West. The two towers were removed and the exterior adapted to the Neoclassical style. The building received its current appearance when it was adapted by the architect Petersen in 1872 to 1874.

The current Neo-Renaissance style main building is constructed in red brick with horizontal cement bands. It consists of a long north-south oriented main wing with two short side wings to the east and an octagonal tower at its southwestern corner and a larger, square tower at the northwestern corner. in the 1890s the interior underwent minor alterations in the under supervision of the architect Axel Berg.

== List of owners ==
- The Crown, –1315
- Sivert Lauridsen, 1315–1316
- Sivert Sivertsen, 1333–1336
- Erik Sjællandsfar, –1370
- Margrethe Glob, married Sjællandsfar, 1370–
- Bodil Blaa née Eriksdatter
- Laurids Jensen Blaa, 1394–1408
- Sivert Lauridsen Blaa, 1408
- Oluf Lauridsen Blaa, 1408–1456
- Anne Sivertsdatter Bølle née Blaa and Eiler Eriksen Bølle, –1535
- Mads Eriksen Bølle , –1539
- Niels Andersen Basse, 1456–1516
- Peder Olufsen Blaa, 1456–1474
- Jørgen Olufsen Blaa and Jacob Olufsen Blaa, 1456–
- Erik Olufsen Blaa, 1456–1503
- Inger Hansdatter Blaa née Pøiske, 1503–1524
- Barbara Eriksdatter Huitfeldt née Blaa
- Otte Clausen Huitfeldt, 1504–
- Christien Nielsen Dyre, 1516–
- Mads Eriksen Bølle, –1539
- Erik Madsen Bølle, 1539–1562
- Birgitte Gøye née Bølle, 1562
- Christoffer Gøye, 1562–1584
- Birgitte Gøye née Bølle, 1584–1595
- Axel Ottesen Brahe, 1595–1616
- Falk Axelsen Brahe, 1616–1618
- Jakob Ulfeldt, 1618–1630
- Frantz Ulfeldt, 1630–1636
- Flemming Ulfeldt, 1636–1657
- Anne Elisabeth Ulfeldt née von der Groeben, 1657–1690
- Sophie Holck née Ulfeldt, 1657
- Christian Christopher Holck, 1657–1676
- Sophie Holck née Ulfeldt, 1676–1698
- Hilleborg Holck, 1698–1724
- Christian Christoffer Holck, 1724–1774
- Gustav Frederik Holck-Winterfeldt and Henrik de Flindt, 1774–1775
- Poul Abraham Lehn, 1775–1804
- Christiane Henriette von Barner, married 1) Kaas, 2) Rosenørn, 1804
- Otto Ditlev Kaas-Lehn, 1804–1811
- Christiane Henriette von Barner, married 1) Kaas, 2) Rosenørn, 1811–1820
- Henrik Christian Rosenørn-Lehn, 1820–1847
- Christiane Henriette von Barner married 1) Kaas, 2) Rosenørn, 1847–1860
- Otto Ditlev Rosenørn-Lehn, 1860–1892
- Christian Conrad Sophus Rosenørn-Lehn, 1892–1899
- Frederik Marcus Rosenørn-Lehn, 1899–1935
- Christian Carl Otto Rosenørn-Lehn, 1935–1970
- Michael Rosenørn-Lehn, 1970–2001
- Hans Michael Jebsen, 2001–

== Gallery ==
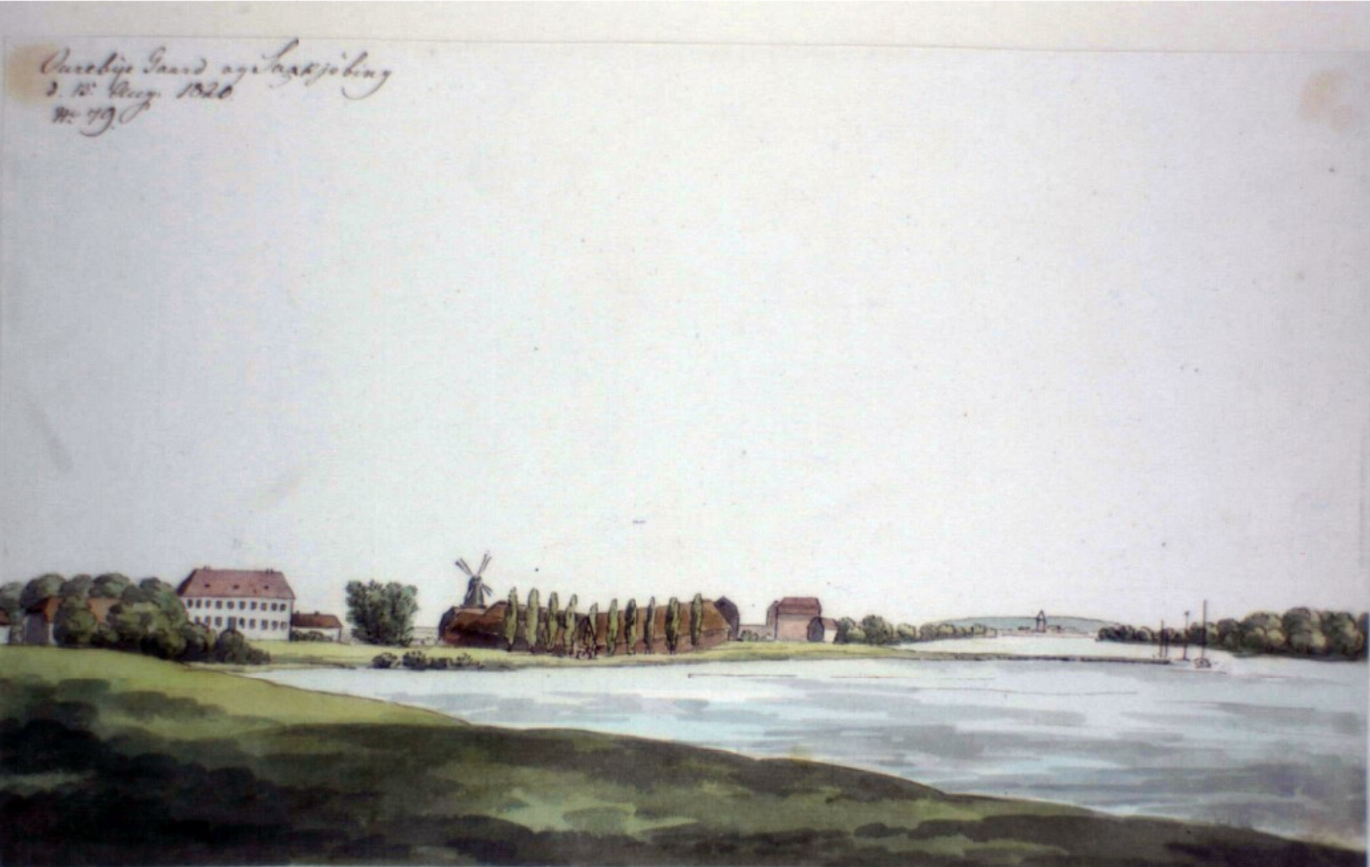
Orebygaard and Sakskøbing Inlet, 13 August 1820, Ole Jørgen Rawert

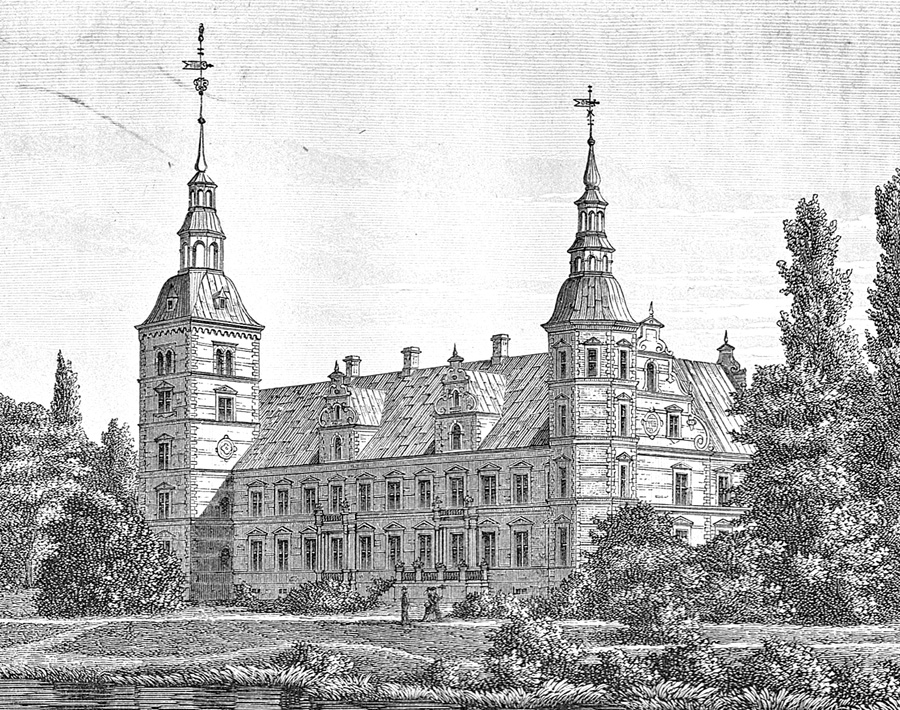
The main building constructed in the 16th century

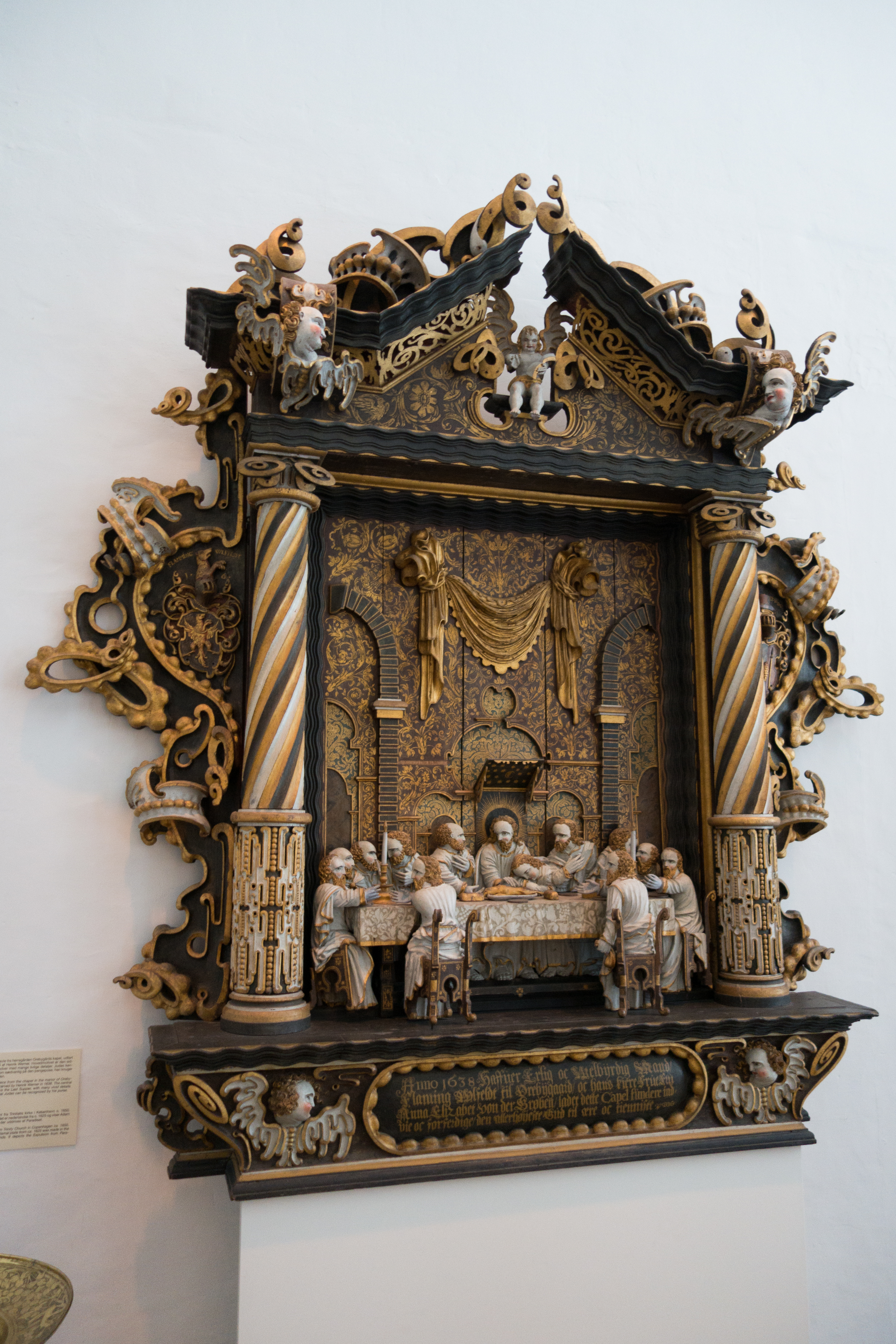
Orebygaard's altarpiece by Henrik Werner which is now on display in the National Museum in Copenhagen
