= Anna Ahlefeldt-Laurvig-Lehn =

Danish noblewoman and heiress (1857–1915)

- Countess Ahlefeldt-Laurvig-Lehn
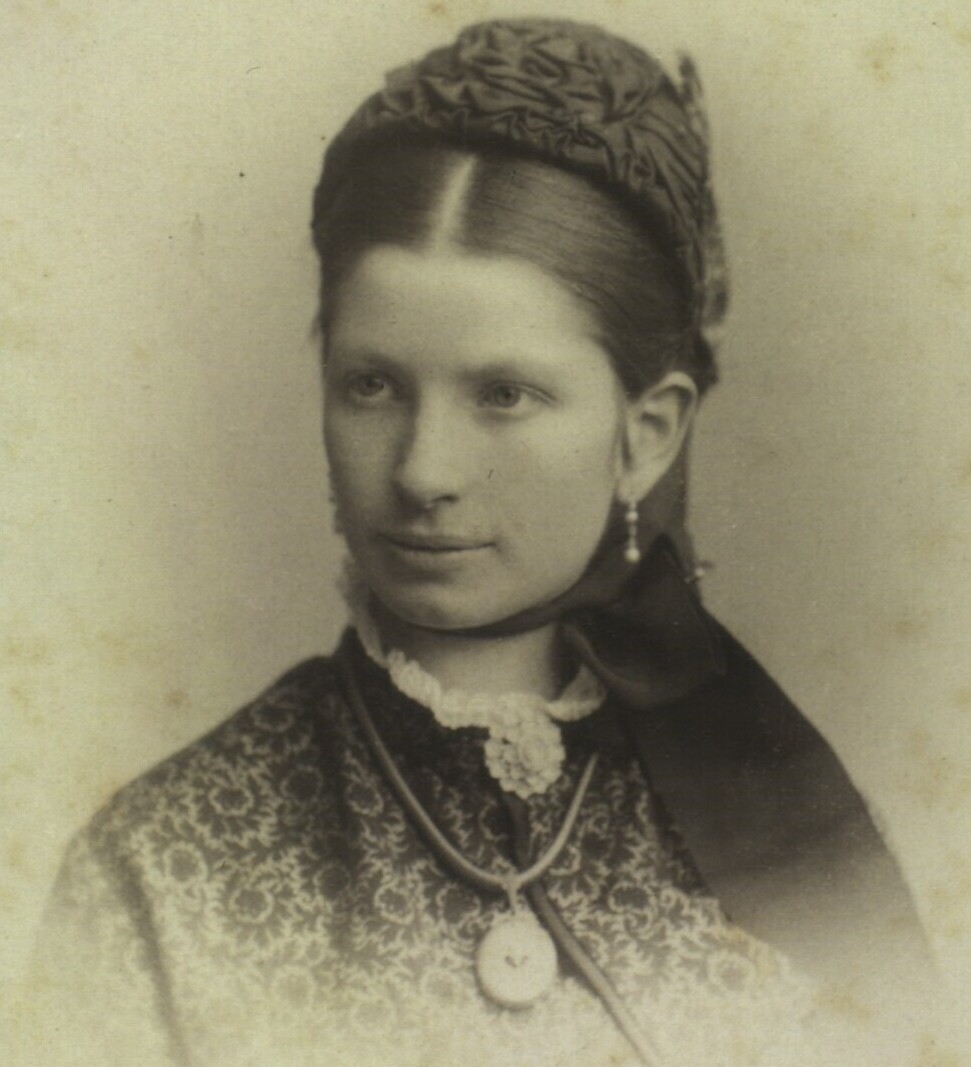
- Portrait of Anna by J. Petersen & Son, c. 1880–1905

7th Holder of the Barony of Lehn
- Reign: 1904 – 1910
- Predecessor: Erik Rosenørn-Lehn
- Successor: Erik Ahlefeldt-Laurvig
- Born: 23 April 1857; Kiel
- Died: 22 September 1915 (aged 58); Hellerup
- Noble family: Rosenørn-Lehn
- Spouse: Frederik L. V. Ahlefeldt-Laurvig
- Issue: Erik Ahlefeldt-Laurvig
- Father: Erik Rosenørn-Lehn
- Mother: Polyxene, Baroness Pechlin von Lövenbach

Anna Christiane Adelheid, Countess of Ahlefeldt-Laurvig-Lehn (born Rosenørn-Lehn; 23 April 1857 – 22 September 1915) was a Danish noblewoman, heiress, and landowner, who held the Barony of Lehn (Danish: Baroniet Lehn) on the island of Funen in her own right (suo jure), as the seventh feudal Baroness of Lehn, from 1904 to 1910.

Born in Kiel, she was the eldest of six daughters of Baron Erik Rosenørn-Lehn and Baroness Polyxene Pechlin von Löwenbach. She grew up at Hvidkilde Castle, and enrolled at the Noble Vallø Foundation as a lady beneficiary. In 1877, she married Count Frederik L. V. Ahlefeldt-Laurvig; the couple had four sons. Upon her father’s death in 1904, she inherited the Barony of Lehn, becoming its fourth female holder (Danish: besidderinde), and managing its estates, including Hvidkilde, with her husband from their family manor of Kærsgaard. From 1905, her husband and descendants assumed the compound surname Ahlefeldt-Laurvig-Lehn. When her husband died in 1909, the countess moved to Copenhagen and in 1910, she transferred, by royal decree, the barony to her eldest son, thus passing it to the Ahlefeldt-Laurvig family.

Although strongly evangelical and associated with the Danish Inner Mission in her youth, she converted to Catholicism in 1889 alongside her sister Polly, two years after their mother’s conversion in 1887. In 1892, she and her youngest sister, Erikke, were admitted to the Danish branch of the Secular Franciscan Order.

Contemporary painter Otto Bache described the marriage as unhappy, and portrayed Anna as sensitive, devout, and increasingly melancholic in later life. She died, aged 58, in Hellerup.

== Biography ==
=== Early life and marriage ===
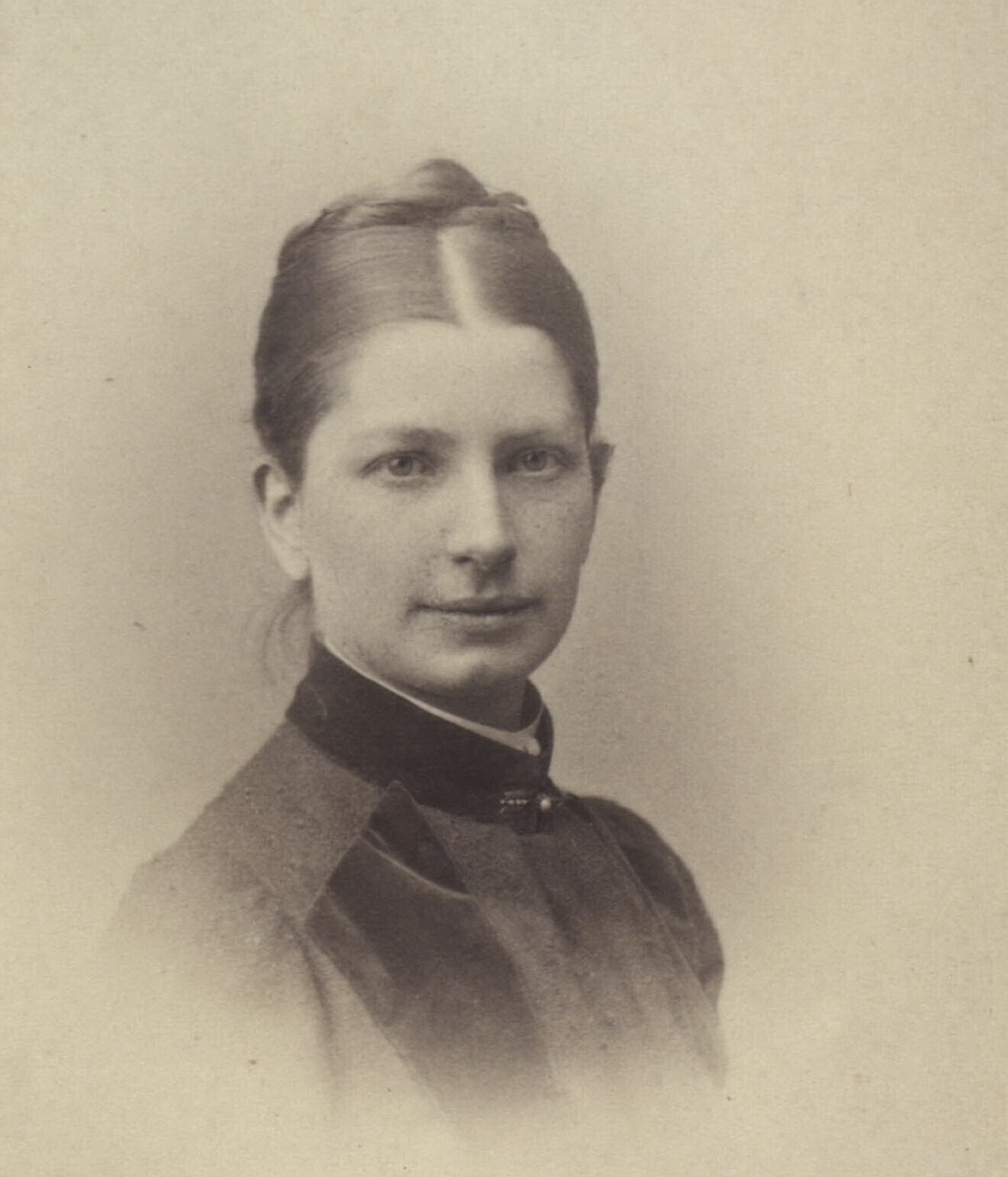
Portrait of Countess Anna Ahlefeldt-Laurvig-Lehn by Hansen & Weller.

Anna Christiane Adelheid Rosenørn-Lehn was born a baroness on 23 April 1857 in Kiel, Schleswig-Holstein, the eldest daughter of feudal baron Erik Christian Hartvig Rosenørn-Lehn and Polyxene Adelheid Louise Elise baroness Pechlin von Löwenbach. Her maternal grandfather, Baron Friedrich Pechlin von Löwenbach, served as Privy Councillor and was the governor and Landdrost of Lauenburg, during this time.

She was the eldest of six daughters, the others were Margarethe Christine Lucie (1859–1887), Edle Frederikke (1860–1921), Polyxene Julie (1862; d. in infancy), Sigrid Benedicte Georgine (1867–1877) and Erikke (b. 1871). She spent her childhood chiefly at Hvidkilde on Funen, the family seat. In 1858, she was entered in the Noble Vallø Foundation as a lady beneficiary.

The household was Lutheran. Her father kept a certain distance from religious expression, while her mother, who was raised by her aunt partly in Frankfurt, Roskilde and later at garrisons in Lauenburg and Kiel, was literarily inclined and politically engaged, encouraging her daughters’ public-mindedness and teaching religious tolerance; though a strict Protestant, she later converted to Catholicism (1887). In youth, Anna was strongly evangelical and associated with the Church Association for the Inner Mission in Denmark.

On 16 November 1877 at Hvidkilde Castle, she married hofjægermester Count Frederik ("Fritz") L. V. Ahlefeldt-Laurvig, son of Frederik Ahlefeldt-Laurvig, 8th Lensgreve of Langeland and his wife Countess Marie Schulin (sister of Louise Schulin, Countess Dannemand). A forester, her husband had bought the manor Kærsgaard in 1873. Together they had four sons, Christian in 1878, Erik in 1880, Frederik in 1882 (who died in infancy), and Julius in 1889.

In 1900, she was a co-signatory to a public declaration in the women’s rights journal Kvinden & Samfundet, addressed to the government and the Rigsdag, condemning the prevalence of rape and urging legislative action.

Her mother converted to Roman Catholicism in 1887, and in 1889 Anna and her sister Polly likewise converted. The change caused tension in the family, and her youngest sister, Erikke, then eighteen, felt isolated and moved to Copenhagen the same year, with her father’s support in the matter.

=== Inheritance of the barony of Lehn ===
Following her father’s death at Hvidkilde on 5 October 1904, Anna succeeded to the feudal Barony of Lehn (Danish: Baroniet Lehn) as its female holder (Danish: besidderinde). She became the seventh holder of the barony, since its erection in 1780 for chamberlain Paul Abraham Lehn. The rules of succession followed agnatic-cognatic primogeniture, and before Anna, three women had also possessed the barony, including her paternal grandmother. She was the great-great-granddaughter, through the female line, of the original acquirer (primus acquirens).

The baronial entail comprised substantial estates on southern Funen, including Hvidkilde, the barony's seat, as well as Nielstrup and Lehnskov in Svendborg County. The estate also included the stud farm Lehnshøj as well as Heldagergård. Outside Funen, the barony comprised the estates of Kiding in Aabenraa County (formerly the Duchy of Schleswig), the Vennerslund estate, in addition to lands on Falster, and the noble estate of Dyttebøl in Angeln. In total, her lands amounted to ca. 2,370 hectares. The Barony was held in fideicommissum and, in 1912 it had a tied capital of 1,263,181 kroner, supplemented by a substituted fideicommissary capital of 426,000 kroner for the estates in Southern Jutland. Combined, this amounted to 1,689,181 kroner (equivalent to roughly 122 million Danish kroner in 2024 values).

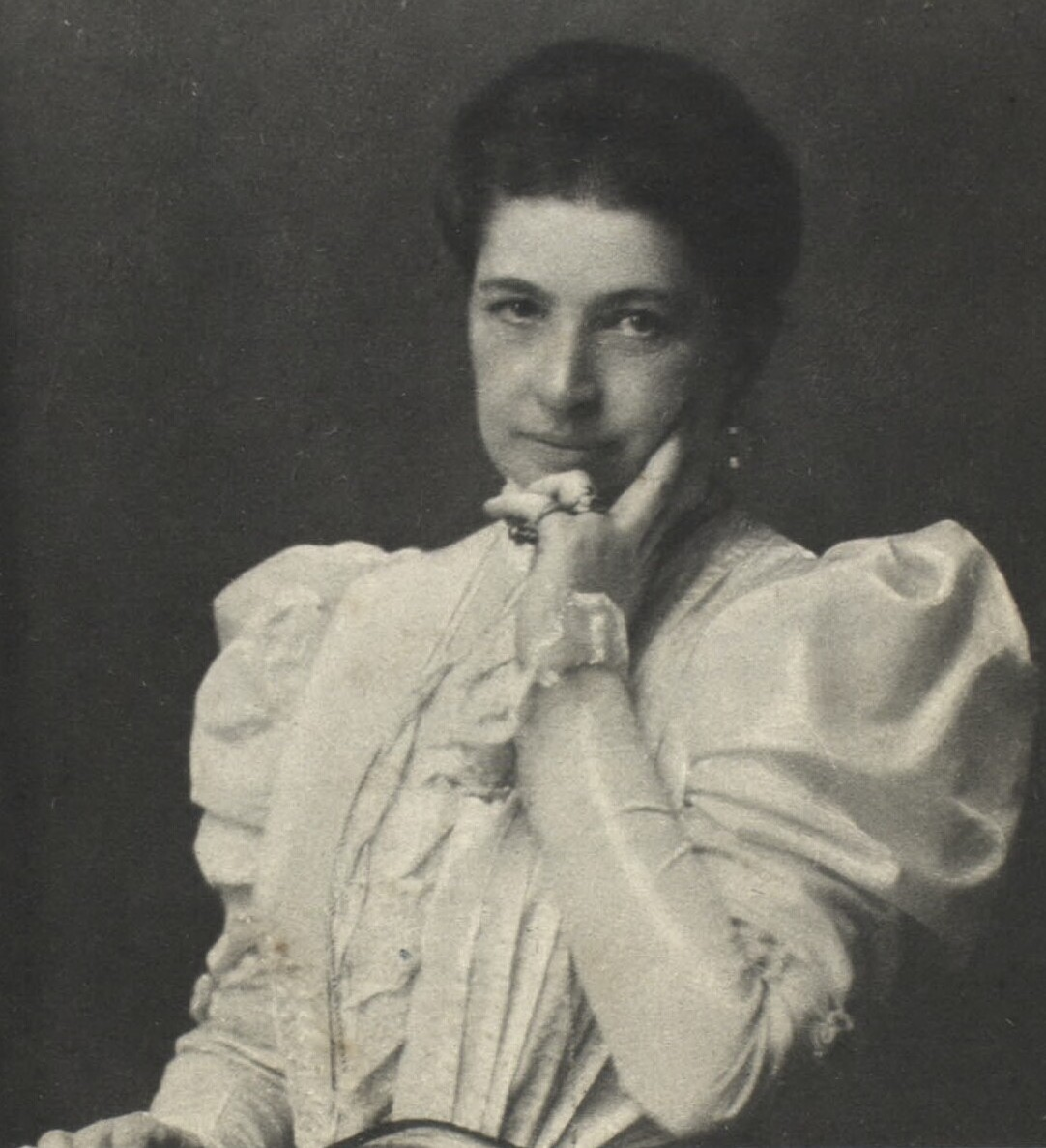
Portrait of Anna Ahlefeldt-Laurvig-Lehn (née Rosenørn-Lehn). Photographer unknown. Taken between 1877 and 1900. Royal Danish Library.

Although legal title and overall control of the estate rested with her, contemporary accounts suggest that the daily management was primarily undertaken by her husband. In the following years, Hvidkilde served as a gathering place for an extensive social circle, being “for a number of years the meeting place for a wide circle”.

By royal patent of 3 July 1905, issued on the occasion of Baroness Anna Rosenørn-Lehn’s inheritance of the barony, her husband was authorized to combine the comital Ahlefeldt arms with the baronial Lehn arms and to bear the compound surname “Ahlefeldt-Laurvig-Lehn”.

As of 2025, her descendants of the Ahlefeldt-Laurvig-Lehn branch still own the estate, although the barony of Lehn was dissolved following the dissolution of entailed estates in 1919, which abolished the institutional basis of all feudal counties, converting them into private freeholds.

=== Later life and death ===
In 1907, Anna Ahlefeldt-Laurvig-Lehn acquired the property Kogtvedhus on the Svendborg Sound, built in 1904 by Frederik Lehmann Weber. Following the purchase, the countess renamed it Stella Maris (Latin for “Star of the Sea”). Her mother became widowed in 1904, and she moved in, but died in 1910.

Following the death of her husband in 1909, Dowager Countess A.C.A. Ahlefeldt-Laurvig-Lehn moved to Copenhagen. By agreement of 26 February 1910 and with royal authorisation of 26 March the same year, she formally relinquished the Barony to her eldest son and successor, Christian Erik Julius Count Ahlefeldt-Laurvig-Lehn, with the transfer taking effect on 1 May 1910. In Copenhagen, she lived on Trianglen, near Bernstorff Park, close to Gentofte.

=== Contemporary account ===
In his memoirs, the painter Otto Bache described Count Fritz Ahlefeldt as a personal friend, noting that his visits “cheered and distracted” the count. Bache characterized the count as “a splendid man,” and his wife, Anna, as “a sensitive but very nervous lady.” In Bache’s view, the husband’s “honest but somewhat forceful [and] positive nature” and the wife’s “delicate, somewhat romantic character” were ill-matched, resulting in an unhappy marriage. He further wrote that she was “very religious,” converted to Catholicism, and, “as is often the case with proselytes”, became “very fanatical,” which “in the end resulted in insanity.” According to Bache, the count “died still in his prime,” while his wife survived him “some years,” becoming “more and more sunk in melancholy”.
