= Lehn =

Lehn is a surname. Notable people with this surname include:

- Abraham Lehn (landowner) (1702–1757), Danish landowner
- Christian vom Lehn (born 1992), German swimmer
- Erwin Lehn (1919–2010), German jazz musician
- Jean-Marie Lehn (born 1939), French chemist
- Poul Abraham Lehn, Danish nobleman
- Thomas Lehn (born 1958), German musician
- Unni Lehn (born 1977), Norwegian football midfielder
