= Admiral Gjeddes Gård =

Building in Copenhagen, Denmark

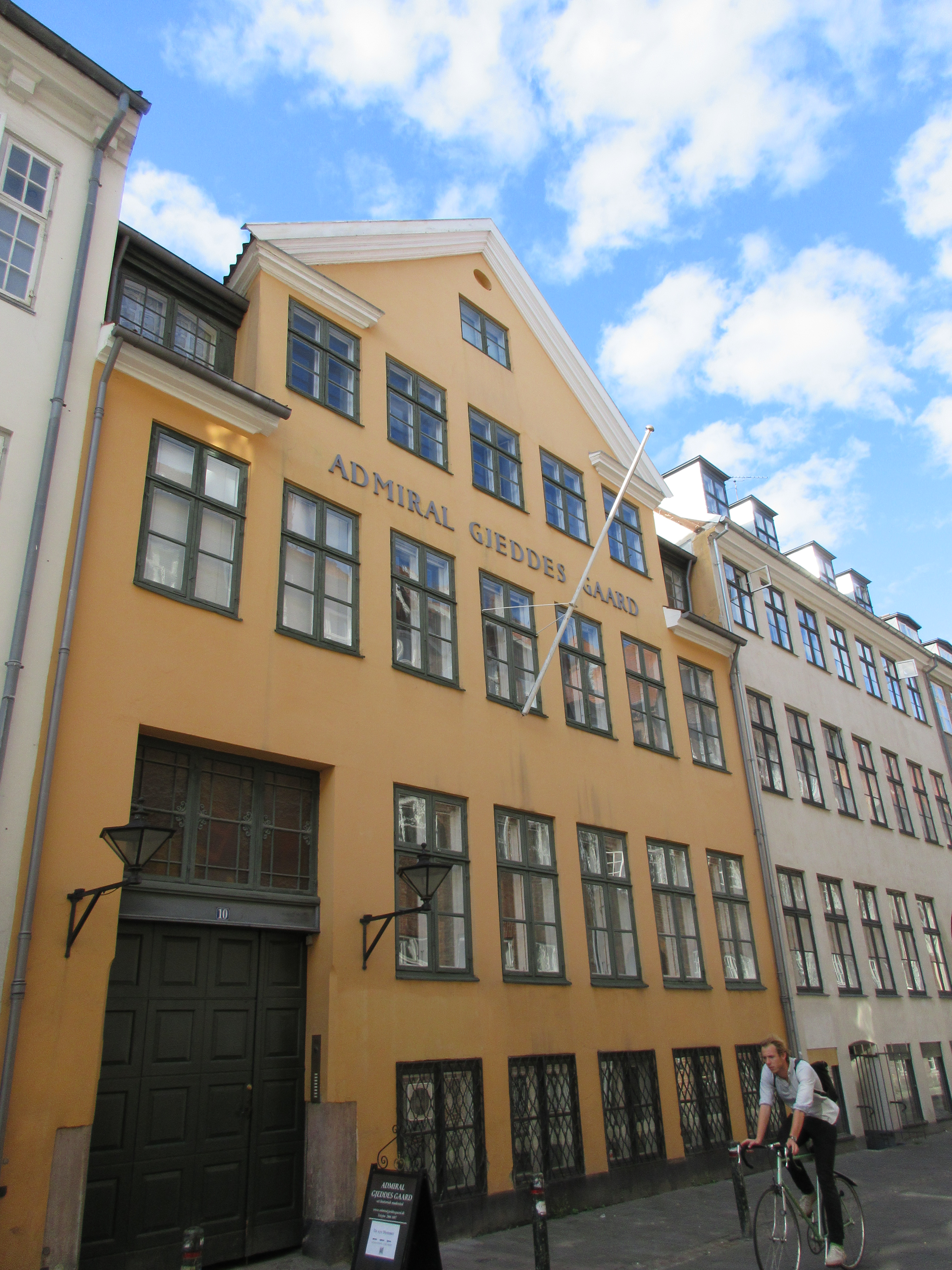
- Interactive map of the Admiral Gjeddes Gård area

General information
- Location: Copenhagen, Denmark
- Coordinates: 55.680704°N 12.574542°E
- Completed: 1738

Admiral Geddes Gård, formerly known as Kanslergården , is a listed, 18th-century property now operated as an event venue at Store Kannikestræde 10 in the Old Town of Copenhagen, Denmark. The building takes its name after Admiral Ove Gjedde, who owned a larger property on the site. The name is, however, rather misleading, considering the present building was constructed after the Copenhagen Fire of 1728 and thus almost 70 years after Gjedde's death.

== History ==
=== Giede family ===
The site was formerly part of a large property owned by Admiral Ove Gjedde. He constructed a house on the site but never lived there himself. His large home was located at Gammel Mønt. The property was from circa. 1670 owned by his son-in-law, vice Chancellor Holger Vind, who also owned the estates Harrested and Gjeddesdal. The property was after Vind's death in 1683 passed to his widow. Her property was listed in Copenhagen's first cadastre of 1756 as No. 43 in Klædebo Quarter. She owned the property until her death in 1706. Their son Wilhelm Carl Vind sold it in 1708 to his uncle, Vice Admiral Frederik Gjedde. A few years later, he sold a narrow strip of the site to Borchs Kollegium which had been founded in 1690. From 1708, Ludvig Holberg served as steward (hovmester) for Gjedde's three sons but left the position after about a year when he obtained a residence at Borchs Kollegium in August 1709. Gjedde moved to Odense in 1713 after being appointed to prefect (stiftsamtmand) of Funen and it is unclear who then owned the property in Store Kannikestræde for the next decade.

=== 18th century ===
Kanslergården was from 1722 owned by Abraham Lehn the Younger, who also owned the Lehn House in Christianshavn He purchased several estates on Lolland in 1725–26 but resided in the building during the winter months. The rest of the building was rented out to foreign envoys. The Austrian envoy was a tenant in the building in 1728.

The house was almost completely destroyed in the Copenhagen Fire of 1728. Lehn did not rebuilt his house in Store Kannikestræde but sold the site to a developer, Oluf Lange, who sold off part of the garden in lots. In 1738, he sold the remain site to Sebastian Lier, another developer. He constructed the buildings at No. 6–10. Chamberlain Hans Frederik Levetzau was a tenant at No. 10 from 1642 to 1644. The property was later acquired by royal physician Hieronymus Laub. The rear wing was at this point a stables with room for four horses and a carriage. In 1748, Laub sold the property to another physician, Jens Bing, who had close ties to Hans Gram and Ludvig Holberg.

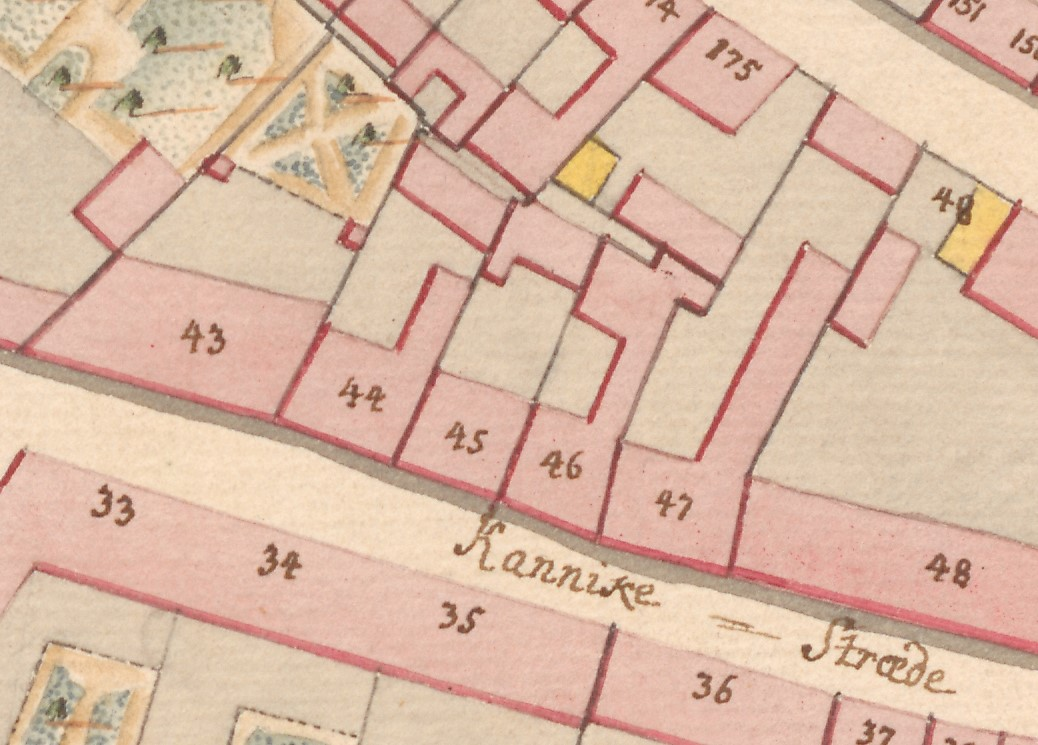
No. 44 seen on a detail from Christian Gedde's map of Klædebo Quarter, 1757.

The first detailed description of the building dates from 1749. The new rear wing contained washhouse in the ground floor and pantry and storage space for firewood on the first floor. A gateway opened to a second courtyard with the new stables as well as henhouse.

Bing died in 1751. He had no children and left the property to the university. The university sold it in public auction to lieutenant-colonel Albrecht v. der Lue. His property was listed in the new cadastre of 1756 as No. 44 in Klædebo Quarter.

In 1763, Lühe sold the property to Supreme Court justice Joachim Anchersen. After his death in 1785 it was once again sold in auction. The buyer was Mads Bie, secretary of Admiraliteten. In 1792, Mads Bie sold the property to Supreme Court attorney Niels Hoftved.

=== 19th century ===
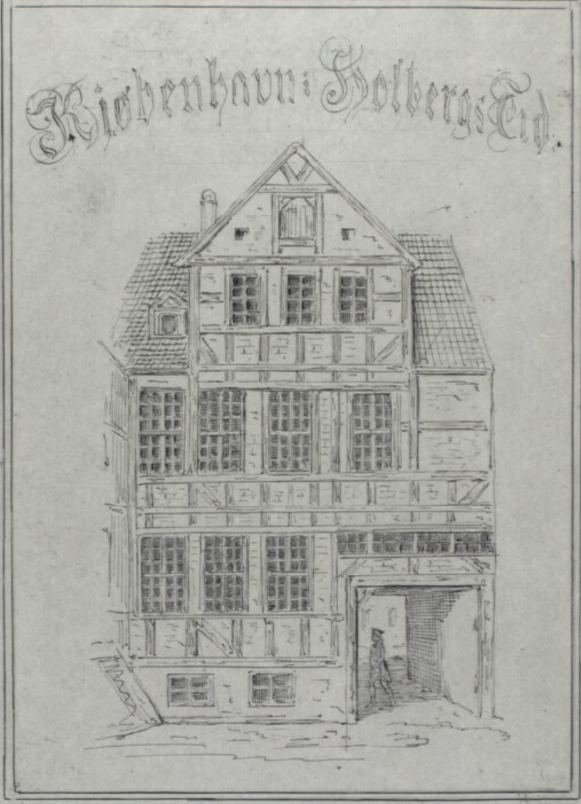
Verdelins gård

In 1794, the property was acquired by printmaker Johan Friederich Foltmar, who converted the side and rear wings into a printing workshop. The property was listed in the new cadastre of 1806 as No. 45 in Købmager Quarter. It belonged to one Hans Hansen at that time. The property was later the same year acquired by merchant Gerhard Lotze. It just escaped the flames during the British bombardment of the city in 1807. Lotze undertook a comprehensive refurbishment of the buildings. The most significant alteration was that he replaced the old stables with a three-storey warehouse.

In 1847, the property was purchased by the grocer Johannes Nicolai Verdelin. He manufactured blue dye, pencils and salpeter in the rear wings. The property was owned by the Verdelin family for 70 years with his son Carl Verdelin and his grandson Olad Verdelin (from 1887= as the next owners. He experimented with cinema lighting and was the first to use limelight in cinemas in Denmark. Several members of the family had literary aspirations. Hohannes Verdelin published a volume of poems and tales in 1812. His son published "Six Romances" in 1840 and a daughter published several volumes of fairytales.

=== 20th century ===
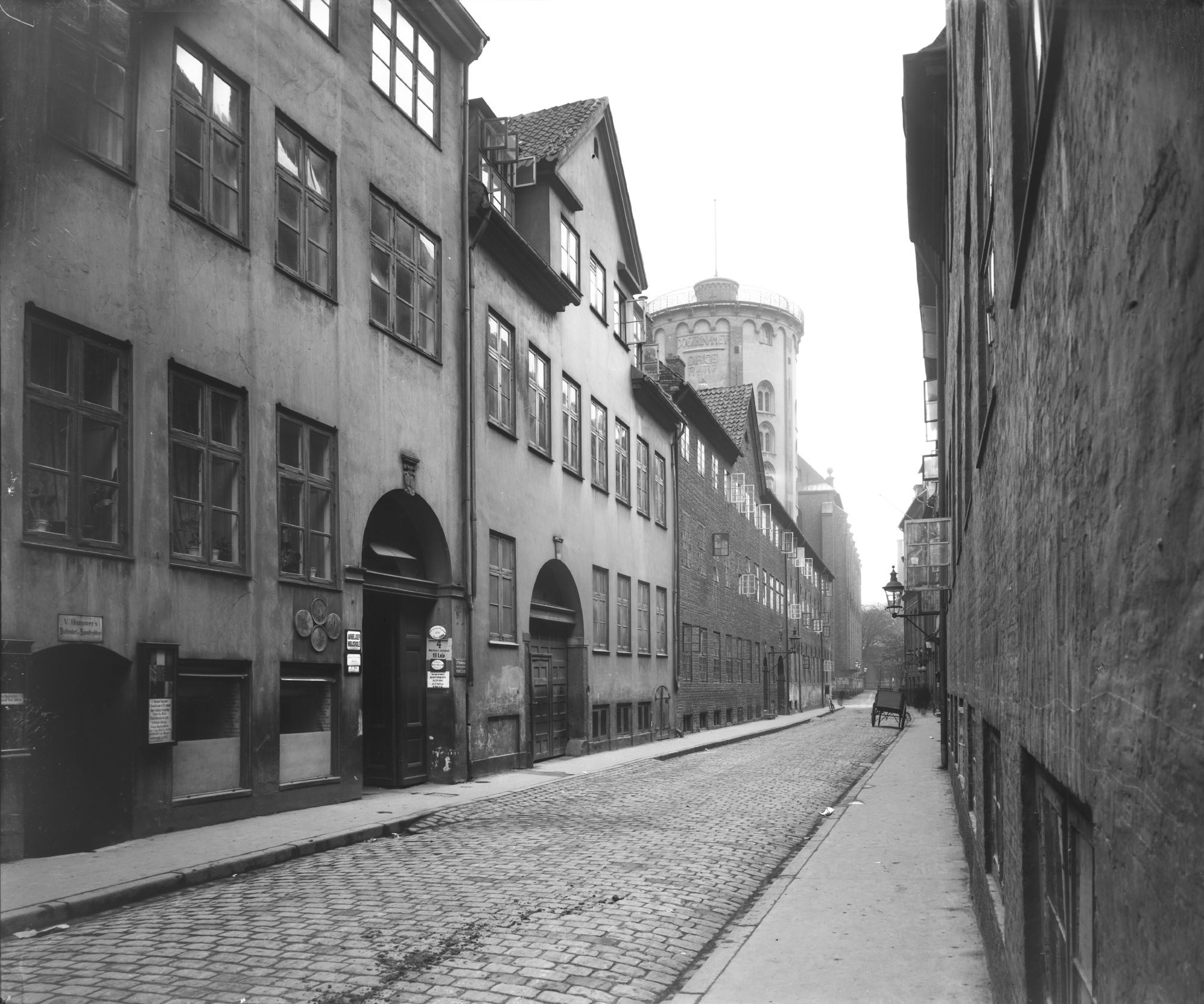
Admiral Gjeddes Gård photographed in 1906

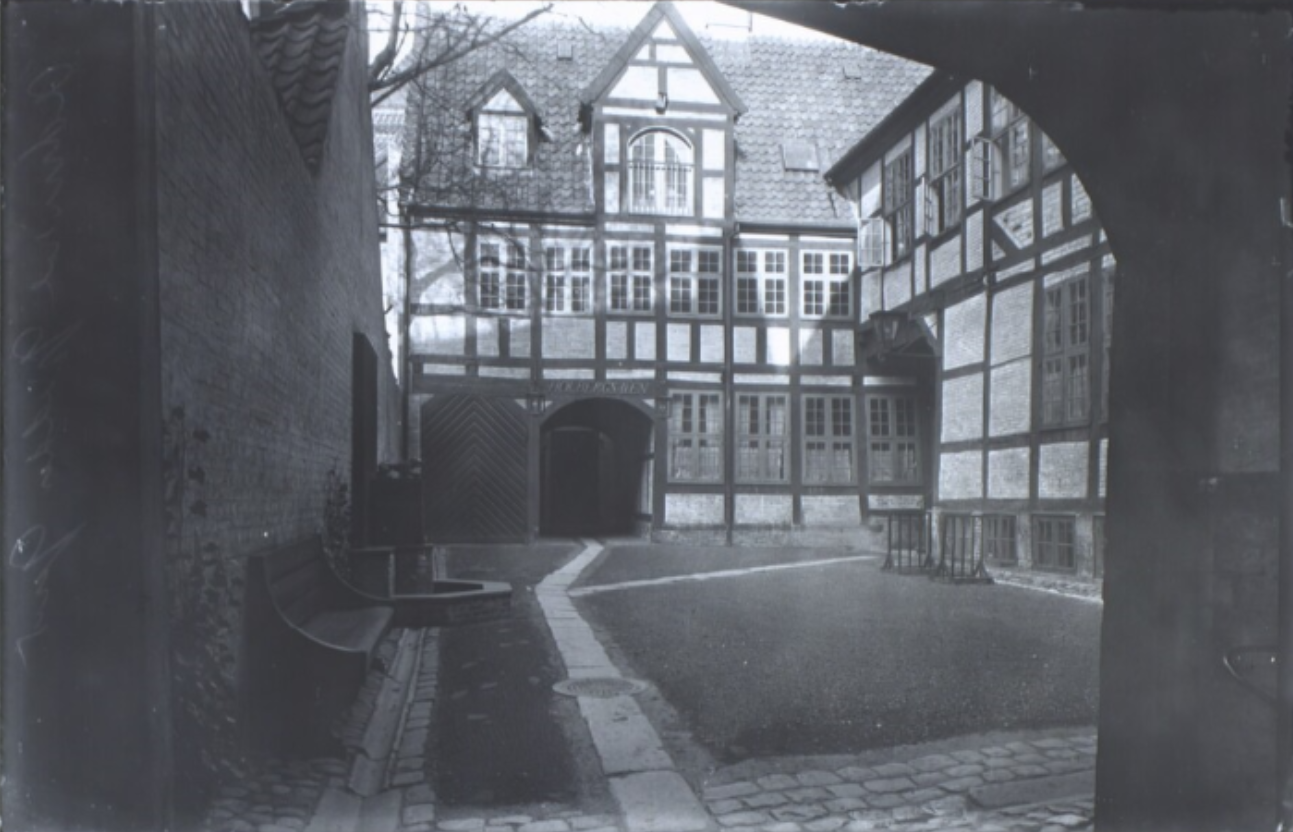
The courtyard photographed by Holger Damgaard

Eddie Salicath, a young wealthy art dealer, purchased the building in 1918. He introduced the name Admiral Gjeddes Gård the architects Henning Koch and professor Carl Petersen with a comprehensive restoration of the complex which was completed in 1920. On the first floor of the rear wing, Salicath opened Holbergsalen, a venue for literary and cultural events. The writer Tom Kristensen made his first public appearance at the opening event in 1920. Later visitors included Hans Ahlmann, Marius Børup, Marie Bregendahl, Broby-Johansen, Chr. Hovmark, Johannes Buchholtz, and Oskar Hansen. The manuscript for Leonora Christine's Jammersminde which had recently been discovered by professor Otto Andrup was exhibited in connection with a Leonora Christine lecture hosted by Dansk Forfatterforening. In August 1920, Salicath and professor Karl Larsen hosted a number of fund raising events to raise money for food aid to Germany and Austria after World War I. Participants included Edith Rode, Fredrik Nygaard, Henning Kehler and Emil Bønnelycke. The courtyard was also used as a venue for social events, for instance a cometogether in connection with Hans Hartvig Seedorff's homecoming from a journey abroad.

The Danish Union of Journalists acquired the building in 1921 for DKK 408.600 . The unions new premises were inaugurated in September 1921 in the presence of Minister of Interior Affairs Krag.

The ground floor of the rear wing was converted into a tavern which was later named Digterkroen, the chief of police and the mayor. The premises were still used for hosting cultural and social events. These included a concert with Jean Sibelius and the violinist Henry Holst.

Knud Røssel, a real estate agent, purchased the building in 1933 for DKK 215.000. Digterkroen closed on 15 July that same year and its former premises were taken over by Konservativ Ungdom. The rest of the complex was divided into Multi-family residential housing. The Knights Hospitaller became a tenant in 1934.

Statutory auditor H. C. Steen Hansen purchased the property in 1942. The designer Holger Blom created a residence in Salicath's former apartment above the Holberg Room. In January 1968, Digterkroen played host to Richard, 6th Prince of Sayn-Wittgenstein-Berleburg's bachelor's party in the building prior to his marriage to Princess Benedikte of Denmark.

== Architecture ==
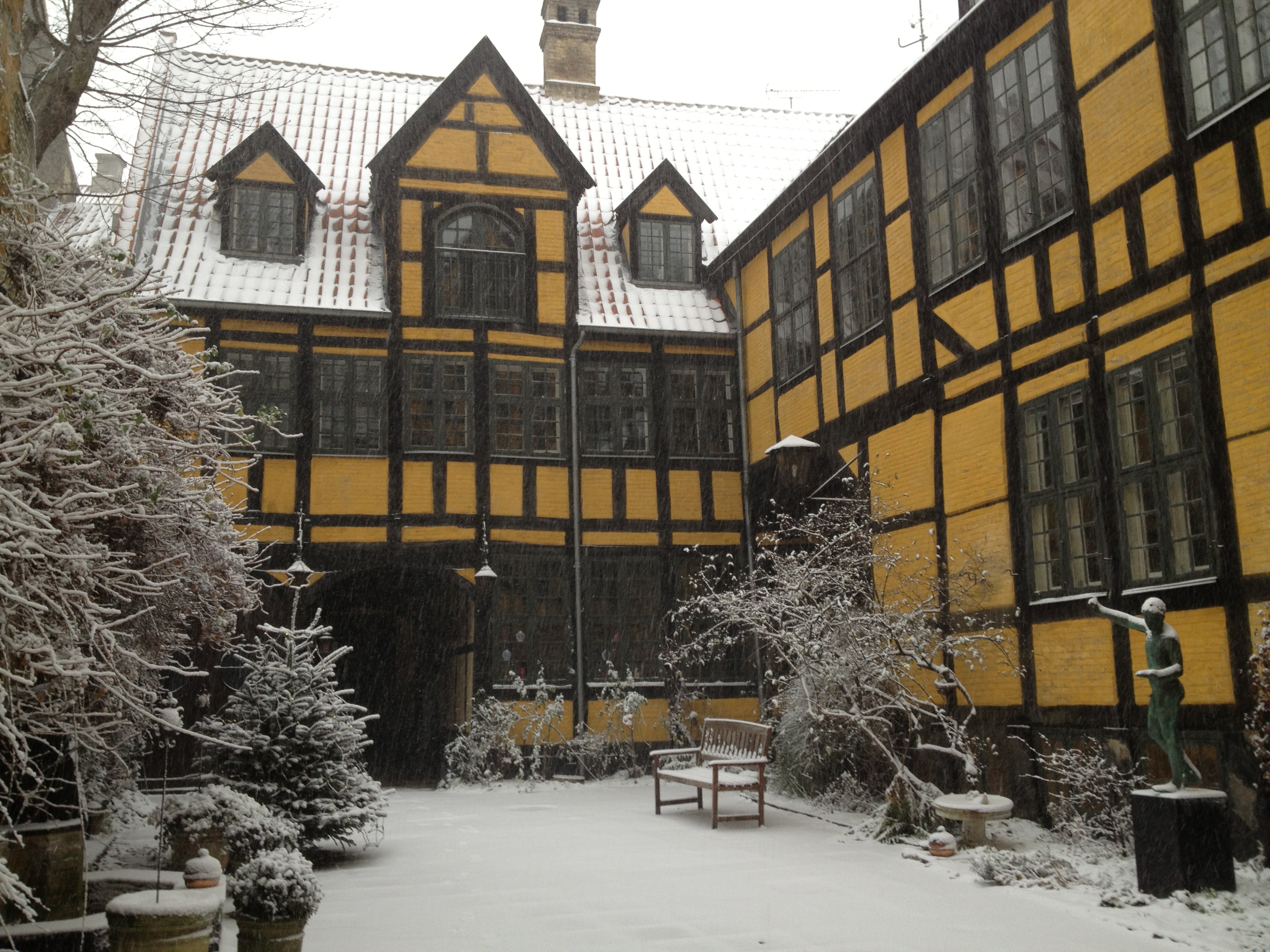
The courtyard in the winter time.

The front wing is constructed with two storeys over a walk-out basement. The facade is crowned by a five-bays-wide gabled wall dormer.

=== Today ===
The rear wing is today owned by Jeanne Grønbæk and Martin von Haller Grønbæk.
