= Højbygård =

Danish manor house

Coordinates: 54°41′46″N 11°26′55″E

Højbygård is a manor house and estate located on the island of Lolland in southeastern Denmark. Since 1825, it has belonged to members of the Lehn family. The current main building is from the 18th century, but has been altered several times.

== History ==
Højbygaard and the village of Højby are first mentioned in 1397 when it was owned by squire Iven Bramsted. A later owner was Axel Gøye. It was later owned by members of the Walkendorff family before it was transferred to Erik Krummedige through marriage in 1475. His son, Claus Krummedige, adapted the main building towards the end of the century and surrounded it by ramparts and moats. His daughter, Drude, brought the estate into her marriage with Marshal of the Realm Otte Krumpen. After Jrumpen's death, Højbygård was passed on to his relative Helvig Ulfeldt. Helvig Ulfeldt's son, Knud Bille, expanded the estate significantly with more land.

Henrik Rantzau purchased Højbygård from Knud Bille's son Holger in 1638. The two next owners were also from the Rantzau family.

Højbygård was in 1685 taken over by the Crown as a result of tax arrears. It was in 1718 included in the local cavalry district. The cavalry district was dissolved in 1725 and Højbygaard was then sold in auction to Abraham Lehn. Lehn acquired Fuglsang and Priorskov the following year and Berritsgård in 1729. He was raised to the peerage under the name Lehn in 1731. He improved the management of his estates, for instance by introducing so-called Holstein rotation (Holsteinsk drift or kobbelbrug) in the 1750s,

After Abrahm Lehn's death in 1757, Højbygaard and Berritsgård was passed to his son Poul Abraham Lehn. In 1780, Lehn was created baron when Berritsgård and Orebygård was converted into the Barony of Guldborgland. He acquired Lungholm in 1784. In 1803, he converted Højbygård, Lungholm and Lungholm into a so-called stamhus, Sønderkarle, which was ceded to his daughter Johanne Frederikke Lehn. She was married to Frederik Wallmoden of Fuglsang. The legal effect of a stamhus was that it could not be sold, mortgaged or divided between heirs. After Johanne Lehn's death in 1805, Poul Godske von Bertouch was created baron under the name Bertouch-Lehn and Sønderkarle was passed to her nephew Poul Godske von Bertouch from Søholt. In 1819, Stamhuset Sønderkarle was converted into a barony. Bertouch-Lehn resided at Lungholm while Højbygaard was used as residence for the estate manager. The land was from 1880 leased by De Danske Sukkerfabrikker and used for cultivation of sugar beets. Højbygaard Sugar Factory (originally the Lolland Sugar Factory) was built on the estate in 1872–1874.

The Barony of Sønderkarle was as a result of the lensafløsningsloven of 1919 dissolved in 1925. Part of the land was converted into 44 smallholdings.

Poul Abraham Bertouch-Lehn died in 1928 and his widow Sophie Bertouch-Lehn stayed on the estate until her death in 1937. It was then passed on to their son Rudolph Bertouch-Lehn. Højbygaard and Lungholm were once again united when Rudolph Bertouch-Lehn inherited Lungholm in 1961.

== List of owners ==
- Iven Bramsted, 1397–
- Axel Mogensen Gøye, –1420
- Inger Walkendorff née Gøye, 1420–
- Henning Walkendorff, 1420–1464
- Karen Henningsdatter Walkendorff, 1445–1477
- Claus Krummedige, 1477–1500
- Drude Krummedige, 1500–1521
- Otte Krumpen ,1521–1555
- Helvig Hartvigsdatter Bille née Ulfeldt, 1555
- Steen Bille, 1555–1590
- Knud Steensen Bille, 1590–1616
- Holger Bille, 1616–1638
- Henrik Rantzau, 1638–1644
- Henrik Rantzau, 1644–1670
- Christopher Rantzau, 1670–1686
- The Crown, 1686–1725
- Abraham Lehn , 1725–1757
- Poul Abraham Lehn , 1757–1804
- Johanne Poulsdatter Wallmoden née Lehn, 1804–1805
- Poul Godske von Bertouch-Lehn, 1805–1831
- Johan Julian Sophus Ernst Bertouch-Lehn,1831–1905
- Poul Abraham Bertouch-Lehn, 1905–1928
- Sophie Bertouch-Lehn, 1928–1937
- Boet efter Sophie Bertouch-Lehn, 1937–1940
- Rudolph Bertouch-Lehn, 1940–1976
- Poul Christian de Bertouch-Lehn, 1976–1986
- Eric Rudolph de Bertouch-Lehn, 1986–2011
- Nicolas de Bertouch-Lehn, 2011–
