= Lungholm =

Danish manor house

General information
- Architectural style: Neoclassical
- Location: Rødbyvej 24, 4970 Rødby, Denmark
- Coordinates: 54°40′18″N 11°27′34″E
- Completed: 1756

Lungholm is a manor house and estate located on the island of Lolland in southeastern Denmark. It has been owned by members of the Lehn family since 1784. The three-winged main building was listed on the Danish registry of protected buildings and places in 1988. It consists of a main wing from 1856 and two side wings from the 16th or early 17th century.

== History ==
=== Olstrupgaarde ===
Lungholm originates in the older estate Olstrupgaarde which is known from 1434 when it was owned by Henning von Hafn. It is not known whether it was a manor house. In circa 1450, it was owned by the nobleman Erik Pors. Half of the estate was in 1455 ceded to Oluf Gøye while the other half after Erik Pors' death was passed on to his three sons Herman, Niels, and Hans Pors.

Erik Pors' sons little by little sold their share of Olstrupgaarde to Oluf Gøye's son Eskil. His descendants owned Olstrupgaarde for several generations but it was in the middle of the 16th century transferred to the Brahe family through marriage. Olstrupgaarde had at this point been divided into two farms.

=== The Rosenkrantz family ===
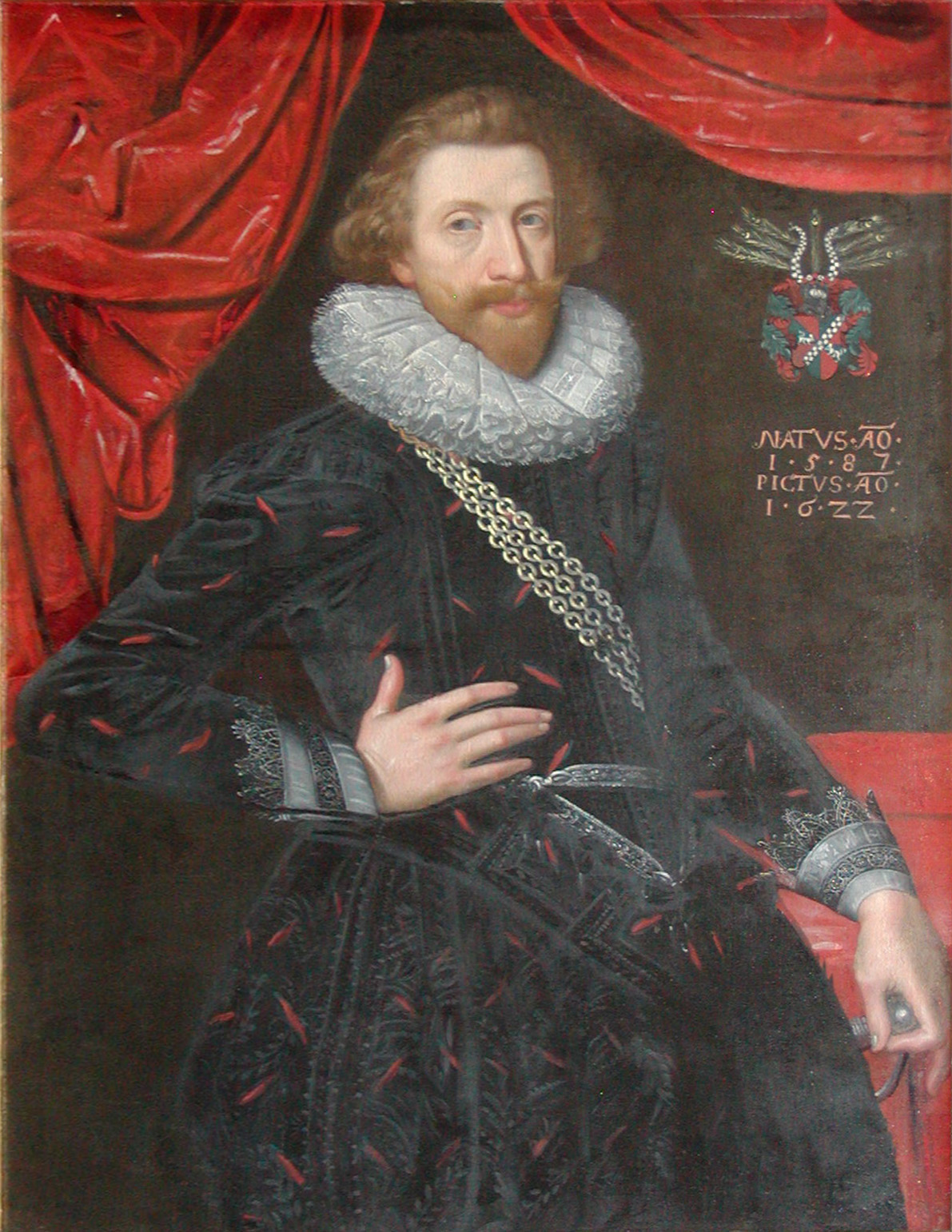
Palle Rosenkrantz

Axel Brahe died without heirs in 1613. His widow, Elisabeth Rosensparre, brought Olstrupgaarde into her second marriage with Palle Rosenkrantz. In 1639 Rosenkrantz merged the two estates and land from the small village of Pugerup into a single manor, naming it Lungholm after his third wife, Lisbeth Lunge. He demolished the two old main buildings and constructed a new one at the same site. Lisbeth Lunge managed the estate on behalf of their sons after Rosenkrantz's de-ath in1642. The probate was postponed until 1649 when the two eldest daughters were married. Lungholm went to the only surviving son, Jørgen Rosenkrantz, but he died at just 23 years old during his grand tour in Venice. Lungholm was then passed on to his brother-in-law, Erik Rosenkrantz (1612–1681), a son of Holger Rosenkrantz, who had married Mette Pallesdatter Rosenkrantz (1632–1665). In 1684, Lungholm was passed to their son Holger Eriksen Rosenkrantz (1657–1690).

Holger Rosenkrantz died in 1690. His widow Margrethe Rodsteen brought Lungholm into her second marriage to Flemming Golck. In 1699, Flemming Golck acquired Errindlev Church and placed in under Lungholm. He died in 1701. Their only son Christian Golck had already died in 1587. On Margrethe Rodsteen's death in 1711, Lungholm was therefore passed to Børge Trolle. In 1621, Lungholm was acquired by Hans Frederik Kaas.

=== Reventlow family ===
Count Christian Ditlev Reventlow, one of the largest landowners in the area, acquired Lungholm in 1823. In 1729, he had accumulated enough land to establish the countship of Christiansborg (later Christianssæde). Lungholm remained in the Reventlow family for two more generations.

=== The Lehn family ===
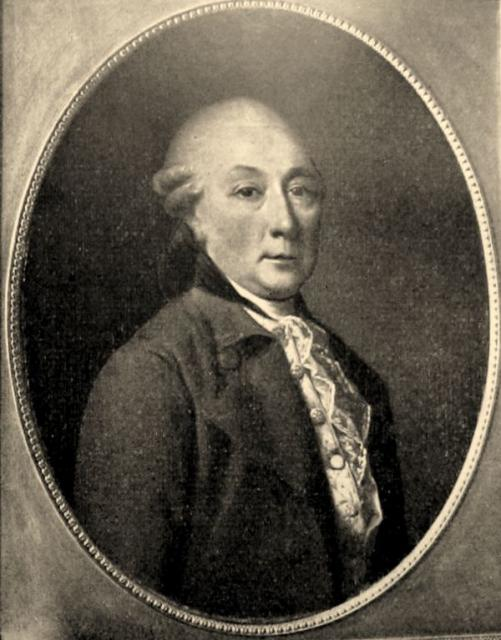
Poul Abraham Lehn

In 1784, Lungholm was sold off to baron Poul Abraham Lehn. He was already the owner of Højbygård, Berritsgård, and Orebygård on Lolland as well as a number of estates on Funen. In 1803, Lehn converted Lungholm and the adjacent Højbygård into a so-called stamhus under the name Sønderkarle for his daughter, Johanne Frederikke Lehn, whose husband was Frederik Wallmoden of Fuglsang Manor. The legal effect of a stamhus was that the estate could neither be sold, mortgaged or divided between heirs. After Johanne Lehn's death in 1805, Sønderkarle was passed to her nephew Poul Godske von Bertouch from Søholt.

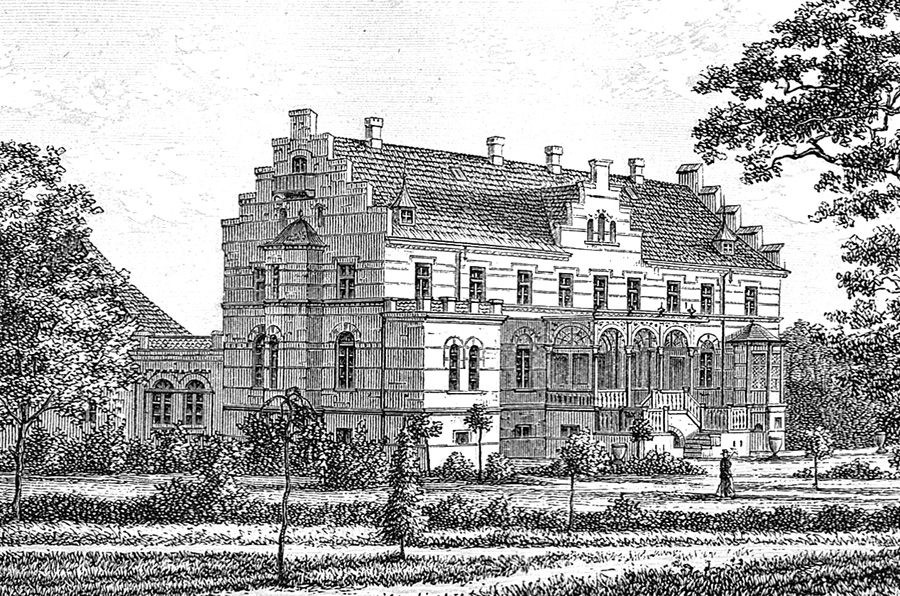
Lungholm in 1872

In 1819, Poul Godske von Bertouch was created friherre under the name Bertouch-Lehn and Sønderkarle was at the same time converted into a barony. He married Henriette Margrethe Klauer in 1821 and the couple made Lungholm their new home. Poul Godske Bertouch-Lehn died in 1831 and his wife and daughter were killed in an accident five years later. Their son Johan Julian Sophus Ernst Bertouch-Lehn was only two years old when he succeeded his father as baron of Sønderkarle. He later engaged in several large construction projects on the estate. These included a new main building and he also constructed new dykes and reclaimed new land following the devastating 1872 Baltic Sea flood. The sale of tenant farms had started in circa 1853. The barony struggled economically in the 1870s.

Julian Bertouch-Lehn died in 1905 and was succeeded by his son Poul Abraham Bertouch-Lehn. He expanded the main building. The barony was as a result of lensafløsningsloven of 1919 dissolved with effect from 1925. Højbygård and Lungholm are still owned by the Bertouch-Lehn family. They were for a while divided between two brothers but have now once again the same owners.

== Architecture ==
The main building consists of a central, two-storey main wing in brick from 1856 flanked by two one-storey side wings from the 16th or early 17th century. The main building was designed by Laurits Albert Winstrup. It was expanded by Henrik Christopher Glahn in 1906.

== Today ==
The current owner of the estate is baron Nicolas de Bertouch-Lehn. In 2022, Nicolas de Bertouch-Lehn sold 775 hectares of land to the Hempel Foundation. The land will be used for an extension of the adjacent Saksfjed-Hyllekrog nature reserve.

The Lungsholm estate covered 1,100 hectares of farmland prior to the sale. The crops included wheat, barley, rye, sugar beets, rapeseed, and grass seeds. Since 2012 most of the farmland (around 965 hectares) are tended by other farmers. Rooms in the main building are let out as hotel rooms.

== List of owners ==
- Henning von Hafn, 1434–
- Erik Pors, 1450–1474
- Oluf Henriksen Gøye, 1455–1484
- Herman, Hans, and Niels Pors 1474–
- Eskil Gøye, 1484–1506
- Mogens Gøye, 1506–1544
- Albrecht Gøye, 1544–1558
- Margrethe Gøye, married Brahe, 1558–1560
- Peder Brahe, 1560–1610
- Axel Brahe, 1610–1613
- Elisabeth Rosensparre, married 1) Brahe and 2) Rosenkrantz, 1613–1622
- Palle Rosenkrantz, 1622–1642
- Lisbeth Lunge, gift Rosenkrantz, 1642–1649
- Jørgen Rosenkrantz, 1649–1660
- Erik Rosenkrantz, 1660–1681
- Erik Rosenkrantz's estate, 1681–1684
- Holger Rosenkrantz, 1684–1690
- Margrethe Rodsteen, married 1) Rosenkrantz and 2) Holck, 1690–1695
- Flemming Holck, 1695–1701
- Margrethe Rodsteen, married 1) Rosenkrantz and 2) Holck, 1701–1711
- Børge Trolle, 1711–1721
- Hans Frederik Kaas, 1721–1723
- Christian Ditlev Reventlow, 1723–1738
- Christian Ditlev Reventlow, 1738–1775
- Christian Ditlev Frederik Reventlow, 1775–1784
- Poul Abraham Lehn, 1784–1804
- Johanne Frederikke Lehn, married Wallmoden, 1804–1805
- Poul Godske von Bertouch-Lehn, 1805–1831
- Johan Julian Sophus Ernst Bertouch-Lehn, 1831–1905
- Poul Abraham Bertouch-Lehn, 1905–1928
- Poul Johan Bertouch-Lehn, 1928–1939
- Poul Christian Bertouch-Lehn, 1939–1961
- Rudolph Frederik Carl Adam Bertouch-Lehn, 1961–1976
- Poul Christian de Bertouch-Lehn, 1976–1986
- Eric Rudolph de Bertouch-Lehn, 1986–2011
- Nicolas de Bertouch-Lehn, 2011–

== See also ==
- Errindlev Church
