= Errindlev Church =

Coordinates: 54°40′06″N 11°29′47″E

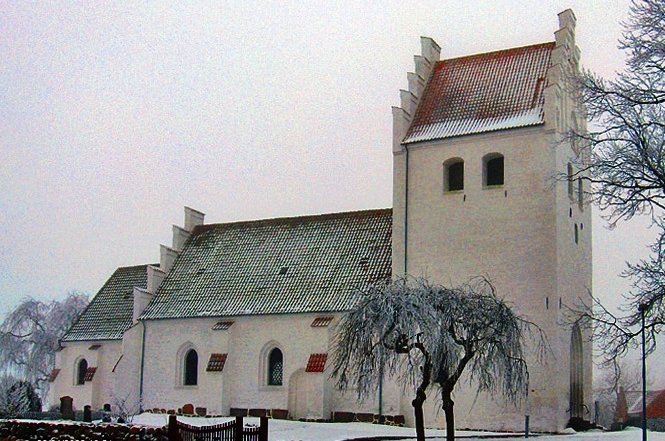
Errindlev Church

Errindlev Church is located in the village of Errindlev some 8 km northwest of Rødby on the Danish island of Lolland. Dating from the second half of the 12th century, the church has a Romanesque chancel and nave.

== History ==
The church is said to have been dedicated to St Nicholas because of its associations with seafarers who used it as a landmark. After the Reformation it belonged to the Crown until in 1699 it was transferred to Flemming Holck of Lungholm whose estate was acquired by Christian Detlev Reventlow. As a result, it later came under his estate Christianssæde. In 1784, it was removed from the authority of the estate together with Lungholm and became part of the barony established in 1819. The church gained its independence in 1924.

== Architecture ==
The church consists of a Romanesque nave and chancel with a Gothic extension and a tower built at the time of the Reformation. Gothic star-shaped vaulting was completed in the nave c. 1275. The Gothic porch on the south side was demolished in 1619 and a new half-timbered porch was built on the north side. Only about half of the Romanesque chancel and nave have remained. Traces of two round-arched windows can be seen in the chancel, one on either side while there is evidence of rounded Romanesque doors in the nave. Building of the tower started in 1530 but was discontinued before it was completed. After numerous difficulties in the supply of bricks, it was finally finished in 1607.

== See also ==
- List of churches on Lolland
