= Lehn House =

Historic townhouse on Strandgade in Copenhagen, Denmark

- Lehns Gård
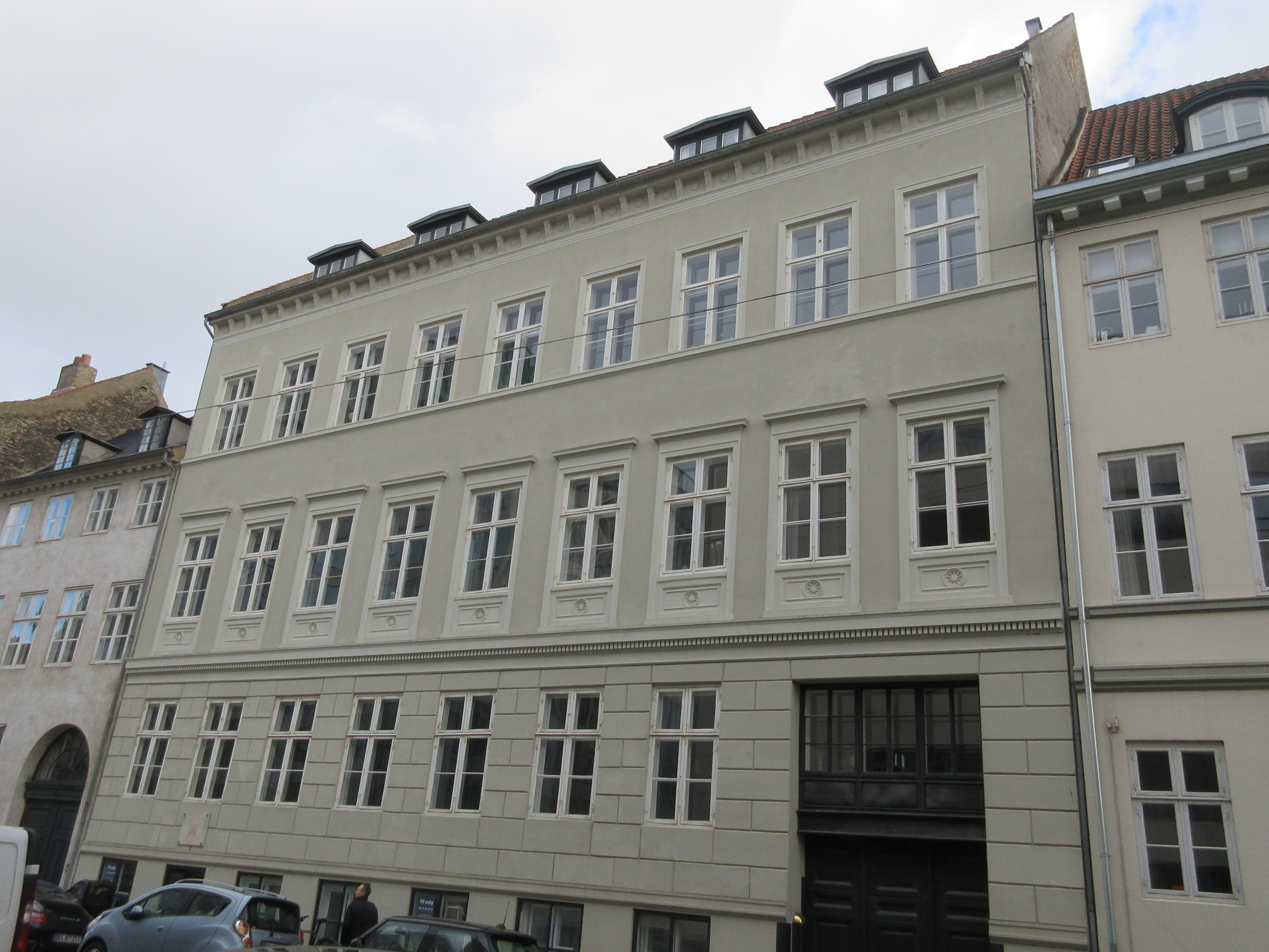
- The building seen from across the street

General information
- Architectural style: Rococo
- Location: Copenhagen, Denmark, Denmark
- Coordinates: 55°40′23″N 12°35′18″E
- Completed: 1703
- Client: Abraham Lehn
- Owner: Andelsforeningen Tordenskjolds Gård

The Lehn House (Danish: Lehns Gård) is a historic townhouse on Strandgade in the Christianshavn neighbourhood of central Copenhagen, Denmark. It is also known as the Tordenskjold House (Tordenskjolds Gård) after Peter Jansen Wessel Tordenskiold, commonly referred to as Tordenskjold, who for a while lived in the building. The Danish Authors' Society is now based in the property whose meeting facilities are also rented out for events. The rooms are notable for their lavish stucco ceilings and murals.

== History ==
=== Origins ===
The first house at the site was probably built shortly after Christianshavn was established on reclaimed land in 1617–1622.

=== Lehn and Tordenskiold ===
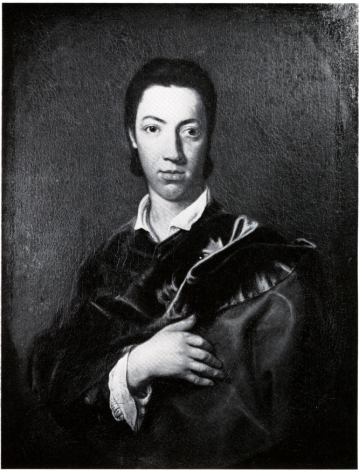
Abraham Lehn Jr.

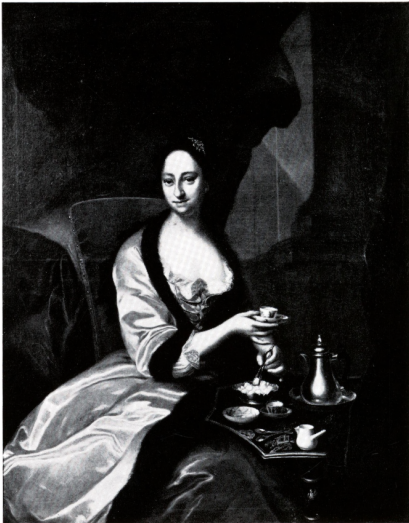
Sophie Amalie Kehn, née Edinger

Abraham Lehn, a wealthy merchant, shipowner and director of the Danish East India Company, constructed a new building on the site in 1703.

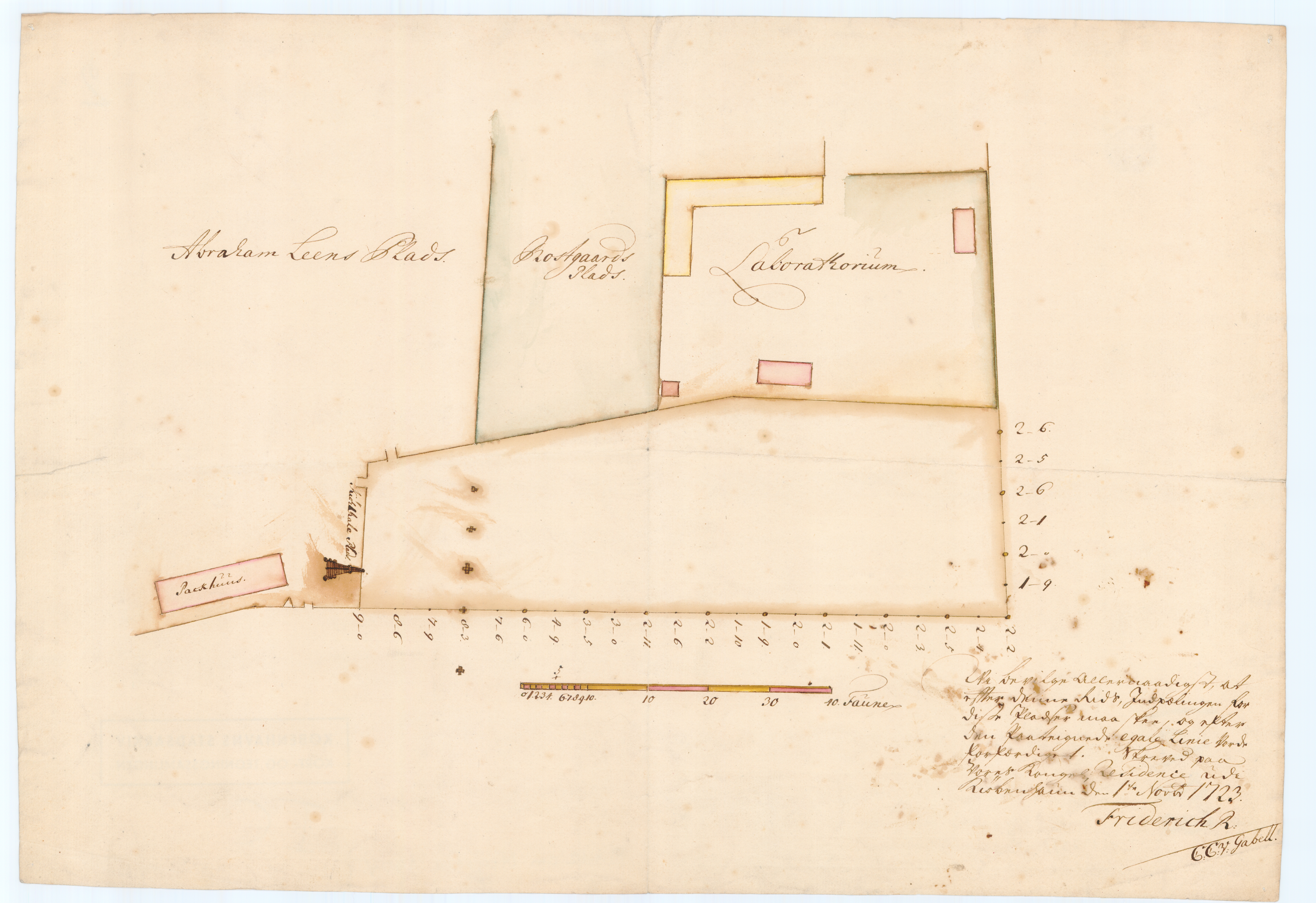
Abraham Lehn's harbour site, 1822

Abraham Lehn's son Abraham Lehn Jr. was still a child when his father died in 1709 and the house was therefore rented out. Peter Tordenskjold, a friend of his, had his first home on land since his childhood on the first floor up until his early death in 1720. It was previously believed that he resided in the small pavilion in the courtyard, but this was not the case. Lehn Jr. made the house his family home in 1721. He later spent most of his time on Lolland where he became a major landowner after acquiring four estates.

=== Reventlow and the Danish West India Company ===
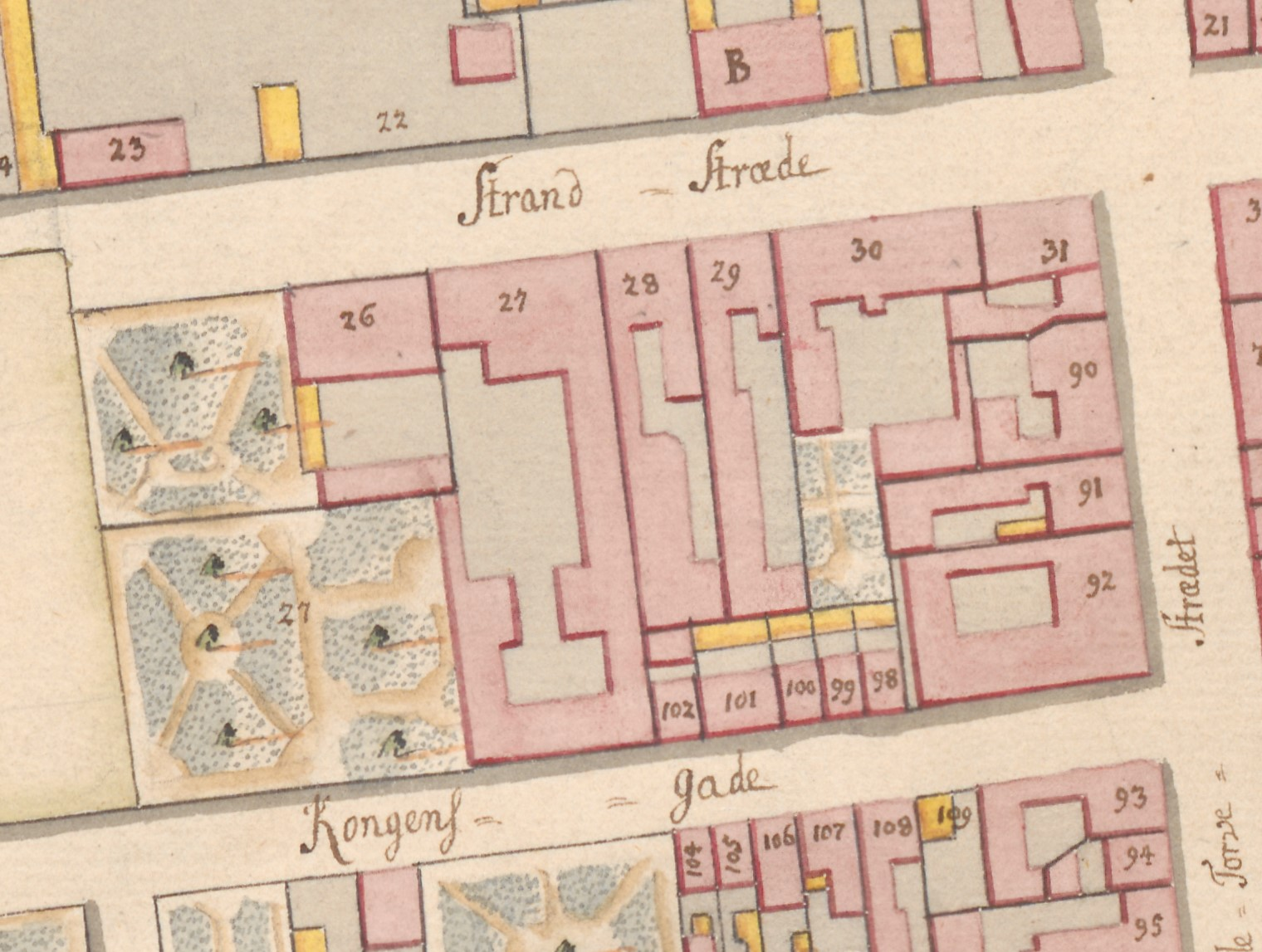
No. 27 seen in a detail from Christian Gedde's map of Christianshavn Quarter, 1757

In 1732, Lehn sold the house in Strandgade to Christian Ditlev Reventlow, whose son, Christian Ditlev Frederik Reventlow, a key figure in the Danish agricultural reforms of the 1770s, was born there in 1748. From 1755, the building served as headquarters for the Danish West India Company. Reventlow's property was listed as No. 27 in the new cadastre of 1756.

=== Peter Fenger ===
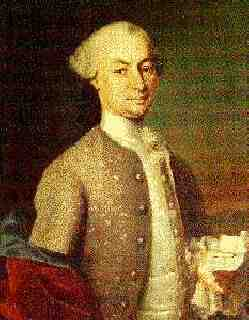
Peter Fenger

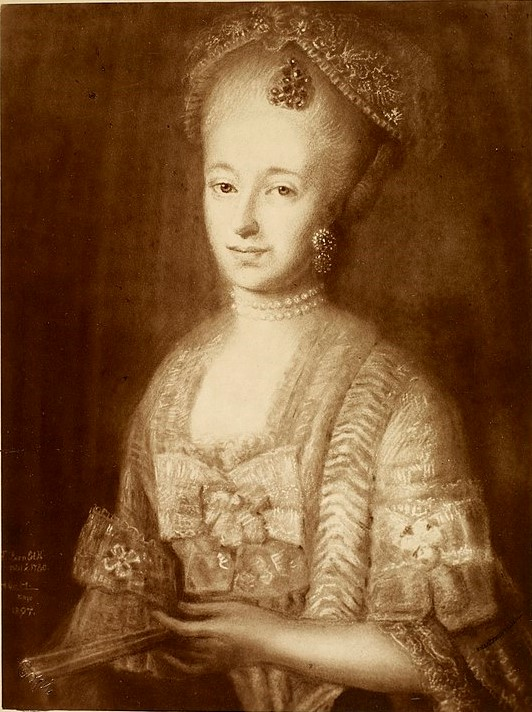
Else Fenger

In 1762, Peter Fenger purchased the property. In 1770, he established a soap manufactury in the yard. His widow Else Fenger kept the property after his death just four years later.

The property was home to 15 residents in the household at the time of the 1787 census. Else Fenger resided in the building with her eight children (aged 11 to 26), a housekeeper, a caretaker associated the adjacent Frederick's German Church, a coachman and three maids.

The property was home to 10 residents at the 1801 census. Else Fenger resided in the building with her sons Jørgen Fenger and Johannes Fenger, a housekeeper and two soap manufacturers. The staff consisted of a caretaker and three maids.

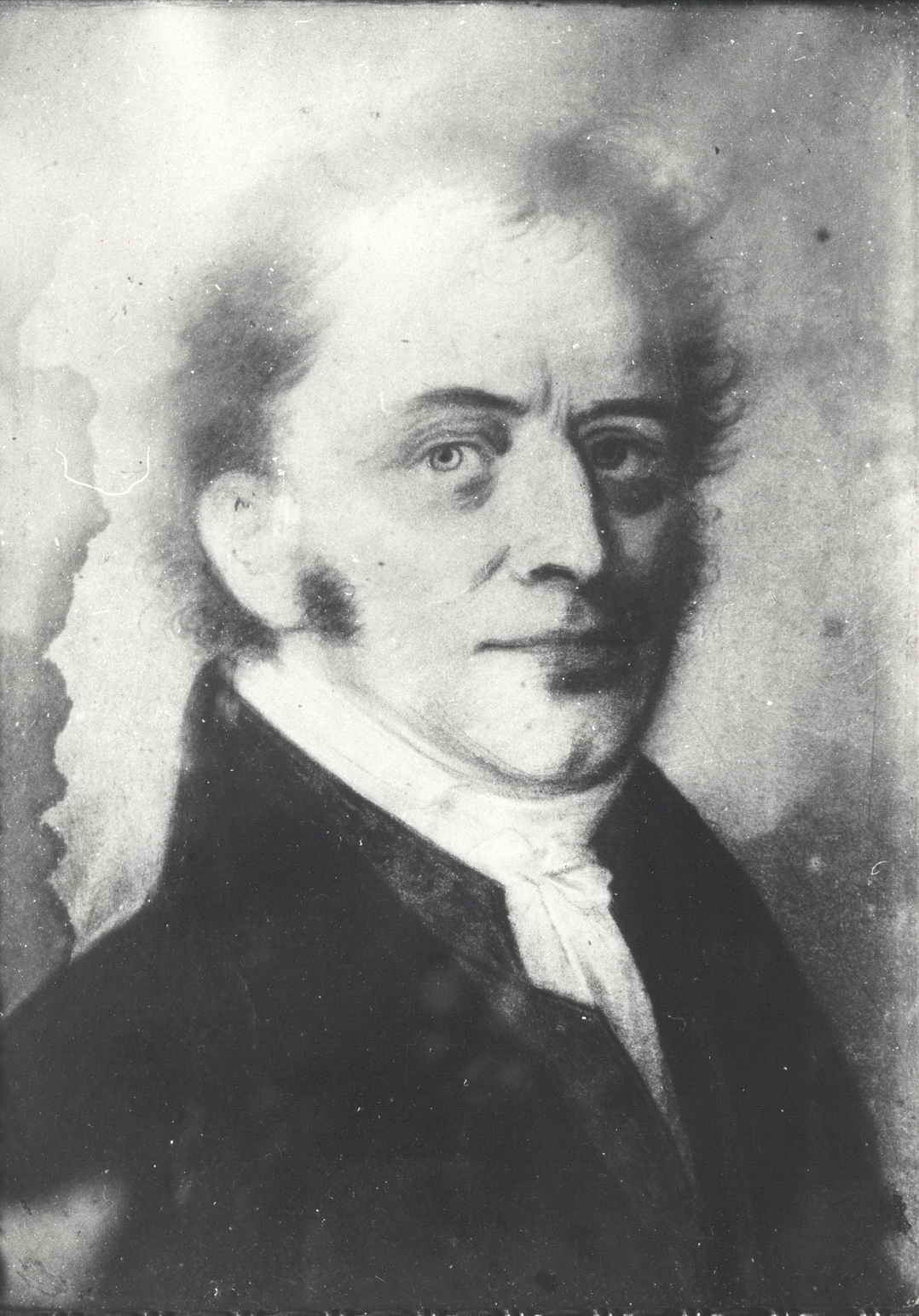
Johannes Fenger

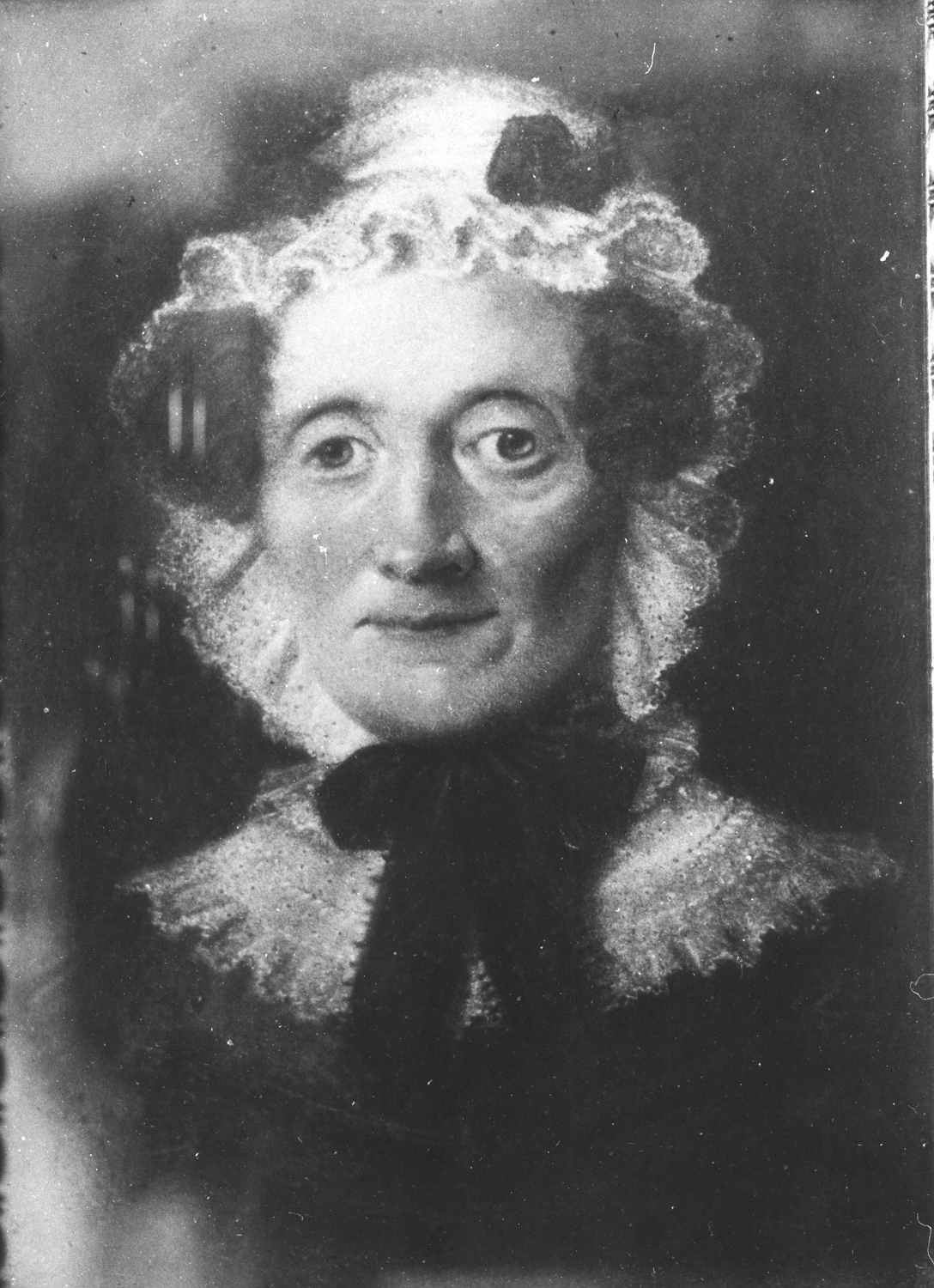
Christine Lorenze Fenger, née Meinert

Else Fenger's property was listed as No. 55 in the new cadastre of 1806. The soap manufactury was continued by Johannes Fenger (1878–1920). He was married to a daughter of Andreas Ewald Meinert in the Behagen House.

Johannes Fenger's brother Rasmus Fenger (1761–1825) spent his last years as pastor of the Church of Our Saviour.

No. 55 was home to 49 residents in eight households at the 1840 census. Martha Helene Fenger (1775-1856), Rasmus Fenger's widow, resided in the building with three of their sons (aged 24 to 31), a housekeeper and a maid. One of the sons was the medical doctor and later politician C.E. Fenger. Georg Pedersen, a new soap manufacturer (grosserer), resided on the ground floor with his wife Elise Pedersen, their three children (aged one to six), his mother-in-law Oline Pedersen, his sister-in-law Laura Pedersen, soap master Frederik Pedersen, one maile servant and two maids. Caroline Hasberg, a widow employed with needlework, resided on the ground floor with her three children (aged four to seven). Maren Kirstine Meinert, a widow, resided on the first floor with her son Andreas Meinert (merchant, grosserer) and two maids. Helene Sich, another widow, was also resident on the first floor. Andreas Schusen, a master joiner, resided on the first floor with his wife Petrea Hegelund, their three children (aged two to six), three joiners and one maid. Marie Hammershaimp, a widow, resided with two sons on the first floor. Johan Enners, an instrumentmaker, resided on the first floor with his wife Marie Enners.

=== 1850-1900 ===
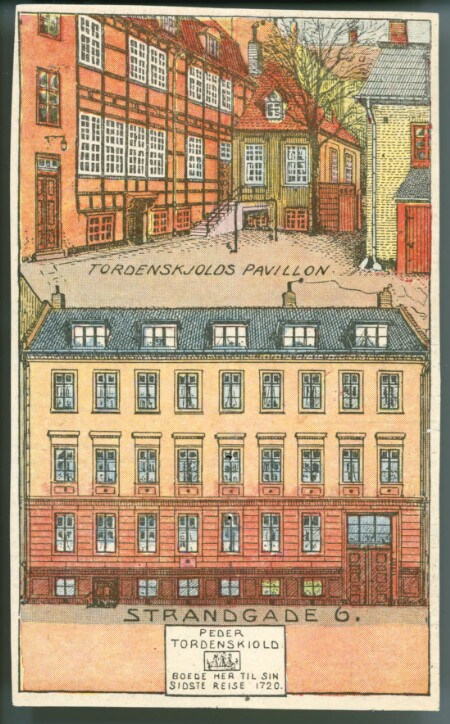
Print commemorating Tordenslkold's association with the property

The property was home to 53 residents in 10 households at the 1855 census. N. C. Dyrlund, a wine merchant, resided on the first floor with his wife Emilie Dyrlund, their three children (aged five to nine), a lodger, a housekeeper and two maids. Dorthea Schleisner, an "institute manager" (institutbestyrerinde), resided on the ground floor with her three children (aged nine to 12) and one maid. Amalie Freund, widow of Hermann Ernst Freund, resided in a single-storey side wing with her two youngest daughters (aged 11 and 13), her son Georg Christian Freund, one lodger and one maid. I. Strünck, a customs official, resided on the first floor of another side wing with his wife Christine Strünck, their five children (aged two to 14) and one maid. Caroline Marie Hasberg, a widow employed with needlework, resided on the ground floor of the same side wing with her three children (aged 13 to 16). Helene Fick, another widow, resided in one of the side wings with the portrait painter Carl Ferdinand Pedersen (1803-1875) and the needleworker Cathrine Mørk. Karen Bressendorff, widow of a haulier, resided in the side wing with her 33-year-old son Peter Hansen Bressendorff (haulier and widower) and his four-year-old son. Carl Wilhelm Höyer, a machinist (maskinmester), resided in the side wing with his wife Juliane Marie Höyer and their four children (aged two to 11). Jens Anders Schou, a watchman, resided in the basement of the side wing with his wife Caroline Schou and their three children (aged 12 to 18).

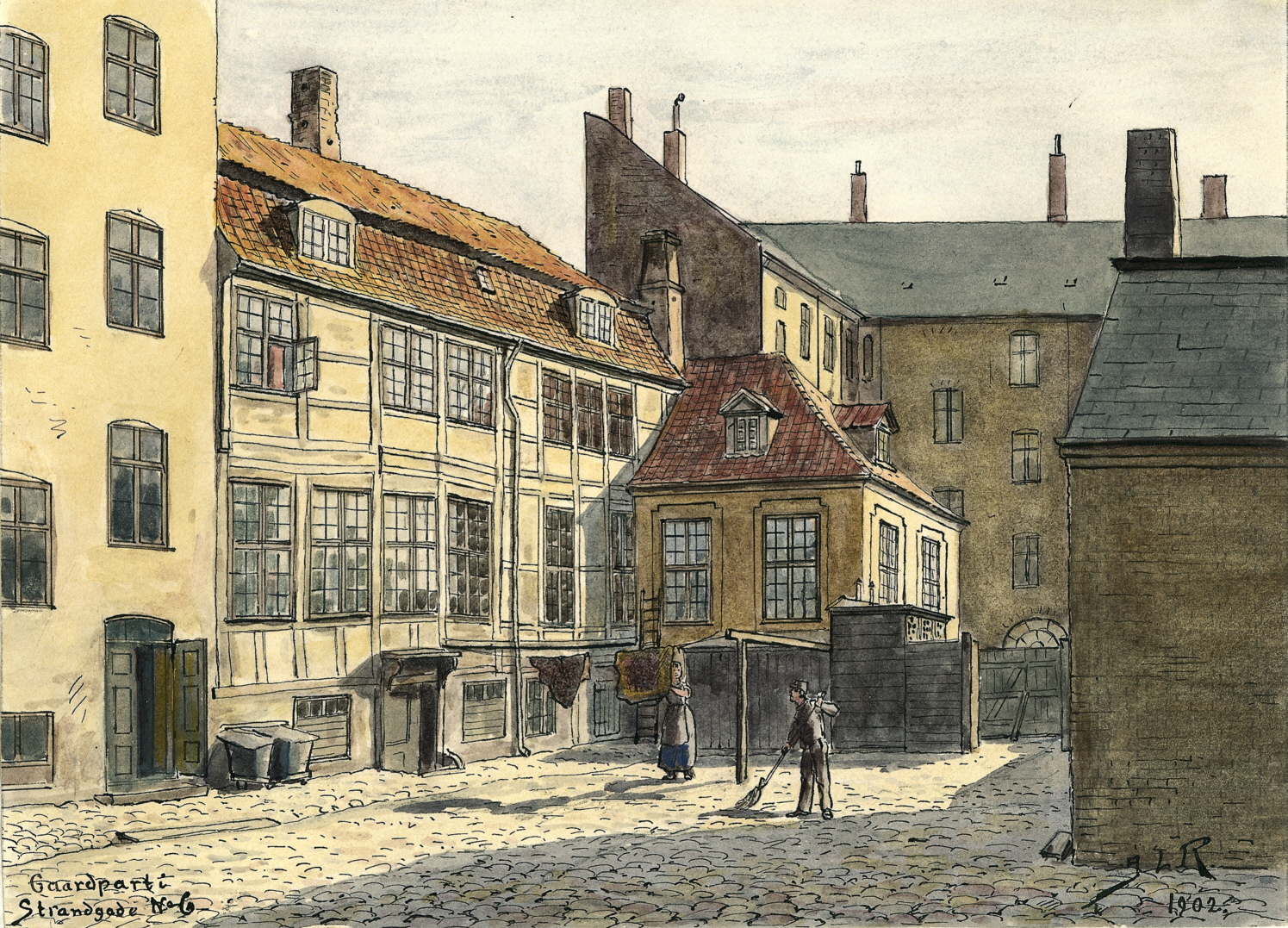
The yard to the rear of the building in 1902, watercolour by J. L. Ridter

In about 1850, the house was purchased by Peter F. Heering, who already owned the Heering House close by and had acquired the quay in front of the building from Lehn in 1725. In 1853, No. 55 was divided into No. 55 A (Strandgade 6), 55 B and 55 C.

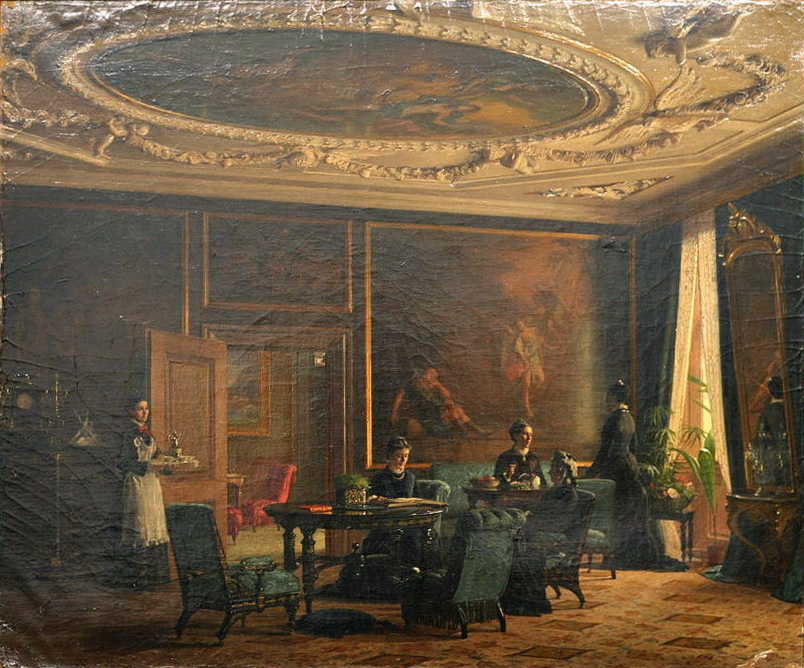
Carl Christian Andersen: Interior from Strandgade 6

The property was home to 17 residents at the time of the 1860 census. Søren Jensen, a master cooper, resided on the ground floor with his wife Ane Madsine Jensen, their two children (aged eight and nine), one maid and three cooper's apprentices. Julius Henrick Schulz, a master blacksmith, resided in the building with his wife Amalie Josephine Schulz, their two-year-old son Alfred Johan Fdr. Schulz and two blacksmiths. Anders Frederik Schou, an "institute manager" (institutbestyrer, schoolmaster or the likes), resided in the building with his wife Martha Elisabeth Schou and two unmarried daughters (aged 33 and 40).

=== 20th century ===
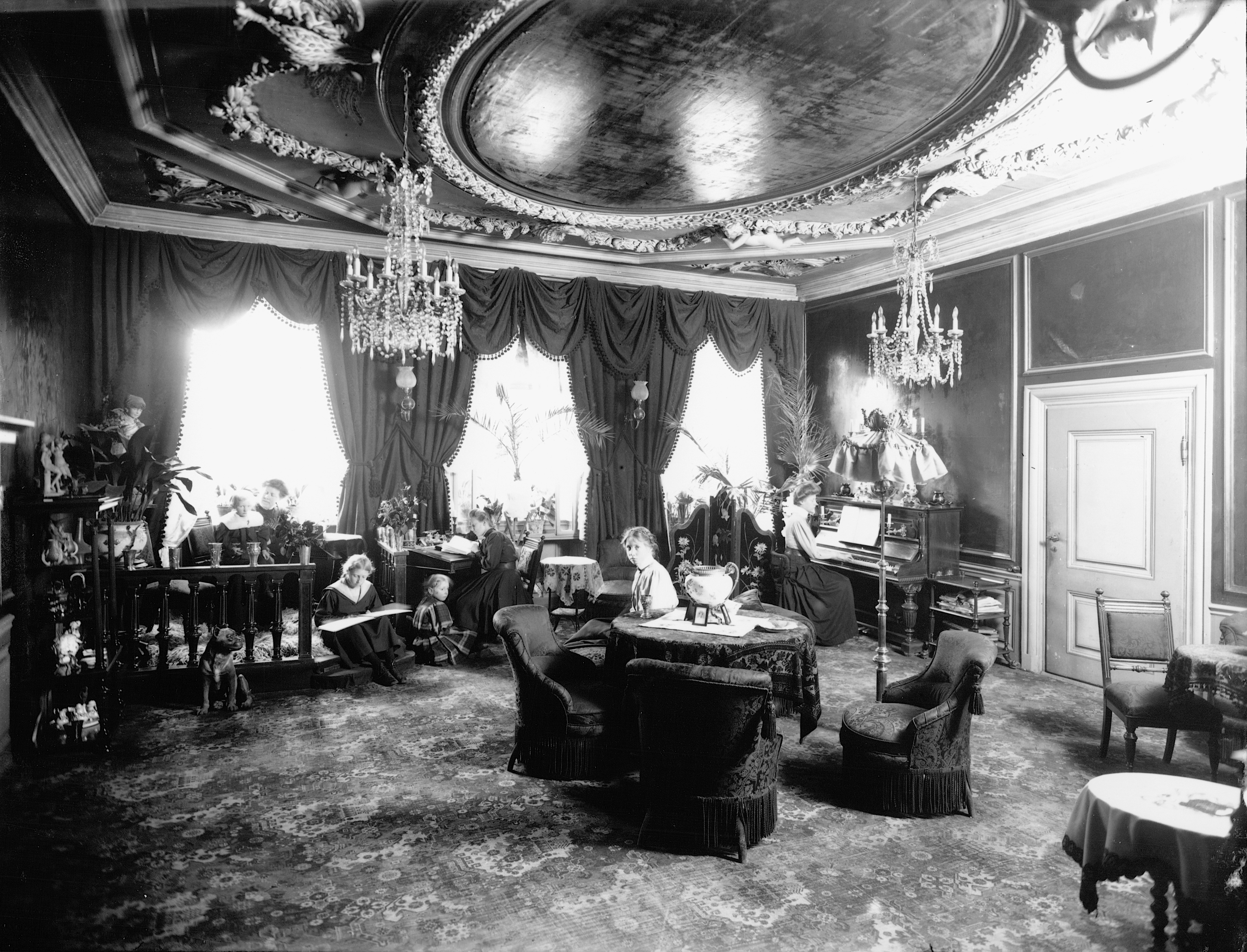
Bruun's living room photographed by Peter Elfelt, 1909

The property was acquired by master mason Johan Jacob Bruun in 1893. Bruun was born in Viborg in 1851. His wife Ella (b. 1859) was from Korsør. They had four daughters, Gudrun, Britha, Ella and Alice. Bruun resided in the building until 1917.

In 1983, the Danish Authors' Society rented the ground floor of the main wing. In 1993, they acquired their premises as well as part of the basement.

== Architecture ==
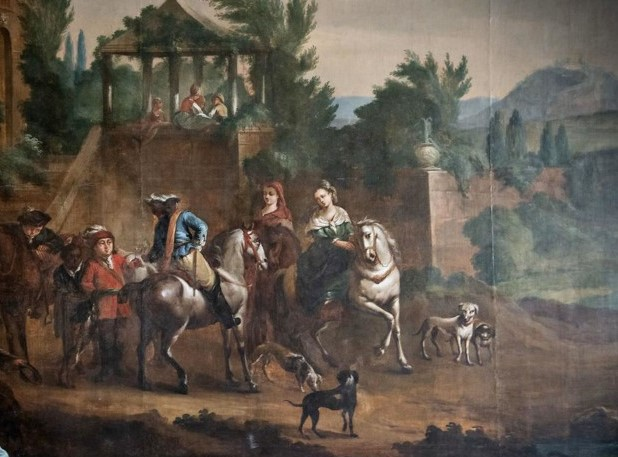
Mural in the ground floor of the building

The original Baroque-style house was only two storeys high but it was extended to three storeys and adapted in the Late Neoclassical style in 1857–1858. The half-timbered side wing was originally only one storey high but later extended with an extra floor.

The Danish Authors' Society's premises on the ground floor are decorated with murals from 1705 by Hendrik Krock featuring subjects from the Old Testament and mythology. The stucco ceilings also date from this time.

In the courtyard to the rear of the building is a small pavilion known as Tordenskjold's Pavilion. It dates from 1763.

== Gallery ==
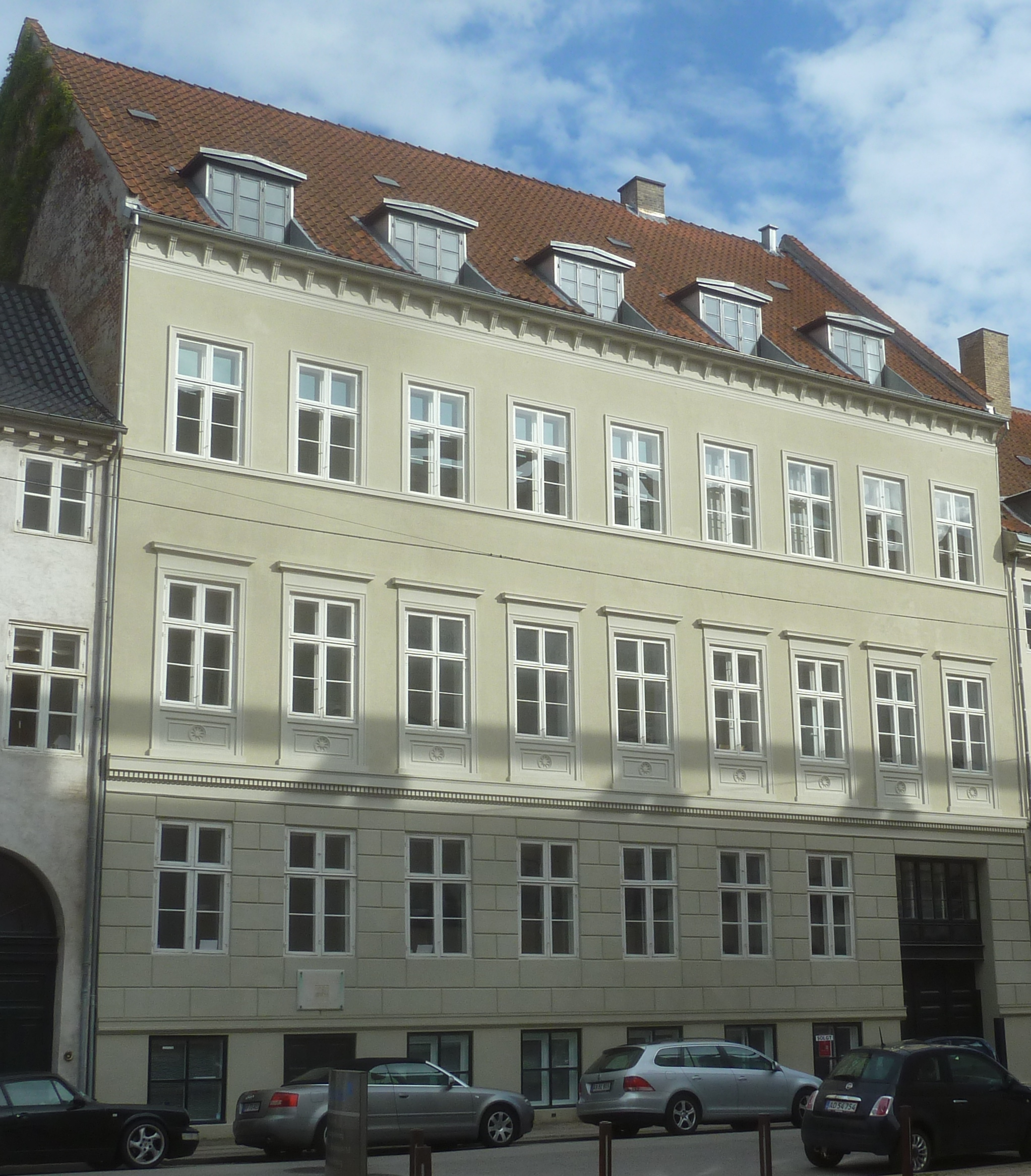

== See also ==
- Listed buildings in Copenhagen Municipality
