= Abraham Lehn =

18th c. Danish landowner

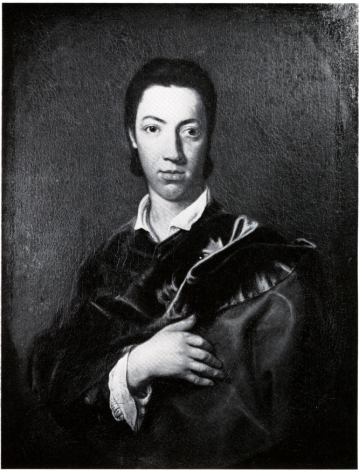
Portrait of Lehn.

Abraham Lehn (10 May 1702 – 31 July 1757) was a Danish landowner. He owned the estates Højbygård, Fuglsang, Priorskov and Berritsgård on Lolland as well as the Lehn House and other property in Copenhagen. He was also a collector of books, paintings and coins. He was the father of Poul Abraham Lehn.

== Early life ==
Lehn was born in Copenhagen, the son of wine merchant Abraham Lehn Sr. (1643–1709) and Cathrine Elisabeth Kreyer (died 1710). He and his brothers were brought up in the home of merchant Christian Schupp after their father's death in 1709. He was until 1717 taught at home by Peder Benzon Mylius (1689-1745). Mylius accompanied him on a Grand Tour which took them to Hamburg, Dresden, Vienna and Paris.

== Property ==
Lehn had inherited circa 200,000 Danish rigsdaler from his father. He purchased Højbygård at auction in 1725, followed by Fuglsang and Priorskov in 1726 and finally Berritsgård in 1729. He took active part in the management of his estates. He had a reputation for being a fair and humane landlord. Lehn and his brother Johan Lehn (1705-1760) were ennobled by letters patent in 1731. He was also the owner of several properties in Copenhagen. He inherited the Lehn House on Strandgade in Christianshavn from his father. He purchased Kanslergården in Store Kannikestræde but it was destroyed in the Copenhagen Fire of 1728. He did not rebuild it but instead sold the site.

== Collector ==
Lehn was the owner of an extensive collection of books, paintings and coins. The collection had been founded on his journey abroad. He left a private library of 5,000 volumes of mainly historical and theological literature. It was for centuries part of the extensive library at Orebygård. His art collection consisted mainly of Dutch paintings, copperprint engravings and etchings.

== Personal life ==
On 25 June 1737, Lehn married Sophie Amalie Edinger (21 March 1700–1768). She was the daughter of merchant Wilhelm Edinger (1659–1733) and Else Margrethe Michelbecker (1668–1720). Lehn and his wife had two children, Poul Abraham Lehn and Erikke Christine Lehn,

He died at Berritsgård on 31 July 1757 and was buried at Majbølle Church.
