= Hvidkilde =

Manor house in Svendborg Municipality, Denmark

Coordinates: 55°04′21″N 10°32′03″E

Hvidkilde is an estate located in Egense Parish in Svendborg Municipality, Denmark. It is situated in the south of the island of Funen.

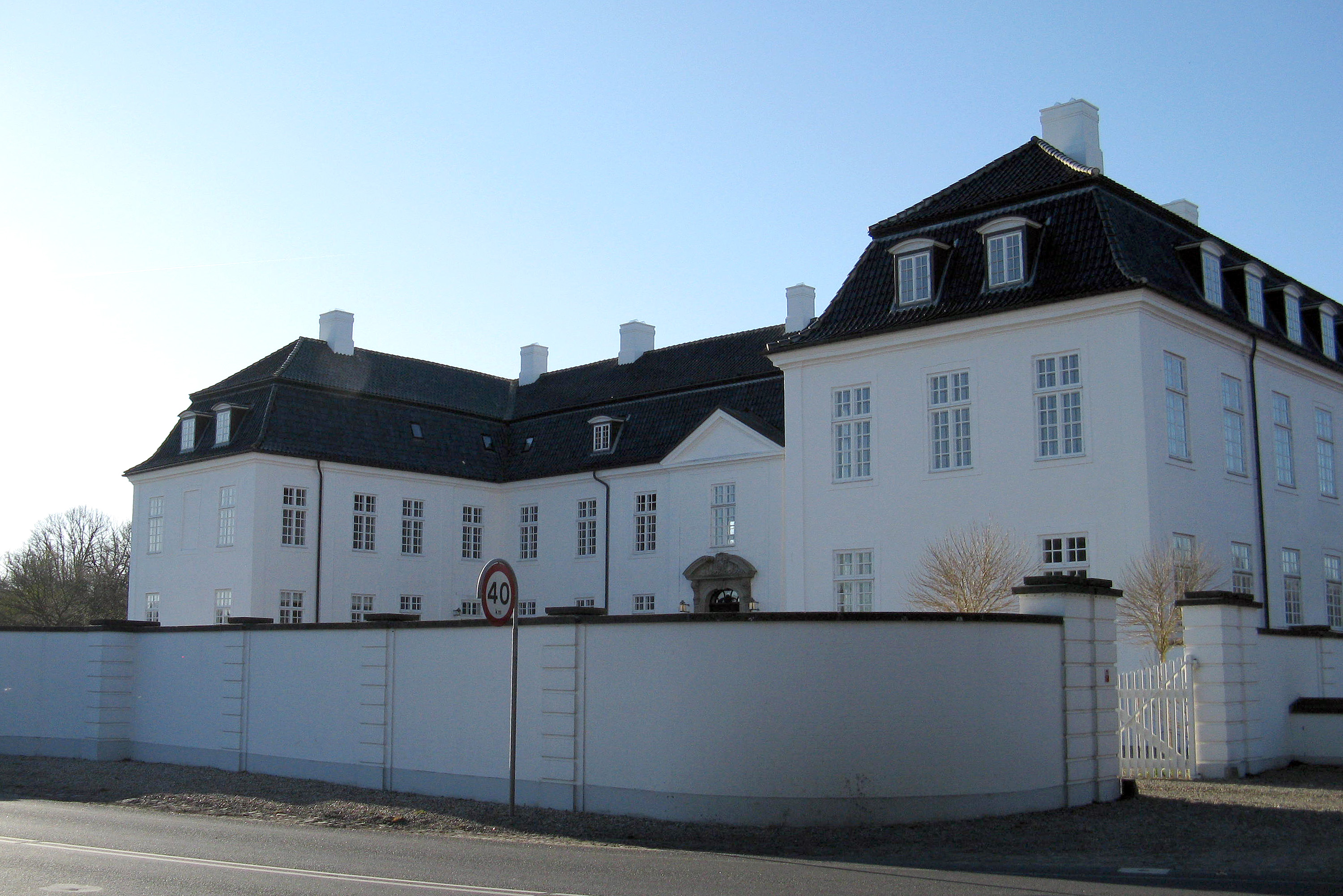
Hvidkilde

== History ==
The earliest reference is from 1480 when it was owned by Claus Rønnow. The main building was built in 1550 and extended in 1742 by Philip de Lange (1704 – 1766). Poul Abraham Lehn, Baron of Lehn (1732 – 1804) acquired the estate in 1760. From 1780, Hvidkilde was the headquarters of the feudal baron of the Barony of Lehn. The main building was surveyed in 1907 under the direction of architect Anton Rosen (1859 – 1928) and was restored in 1919.

== Building ==
The present main building consists of three wings around a courtyard.
