= Poul Abraham Lehn =

Danish feudal baron (1732–1804)

Poul Abraham Lehn Baron of Lehn and Guldborgland
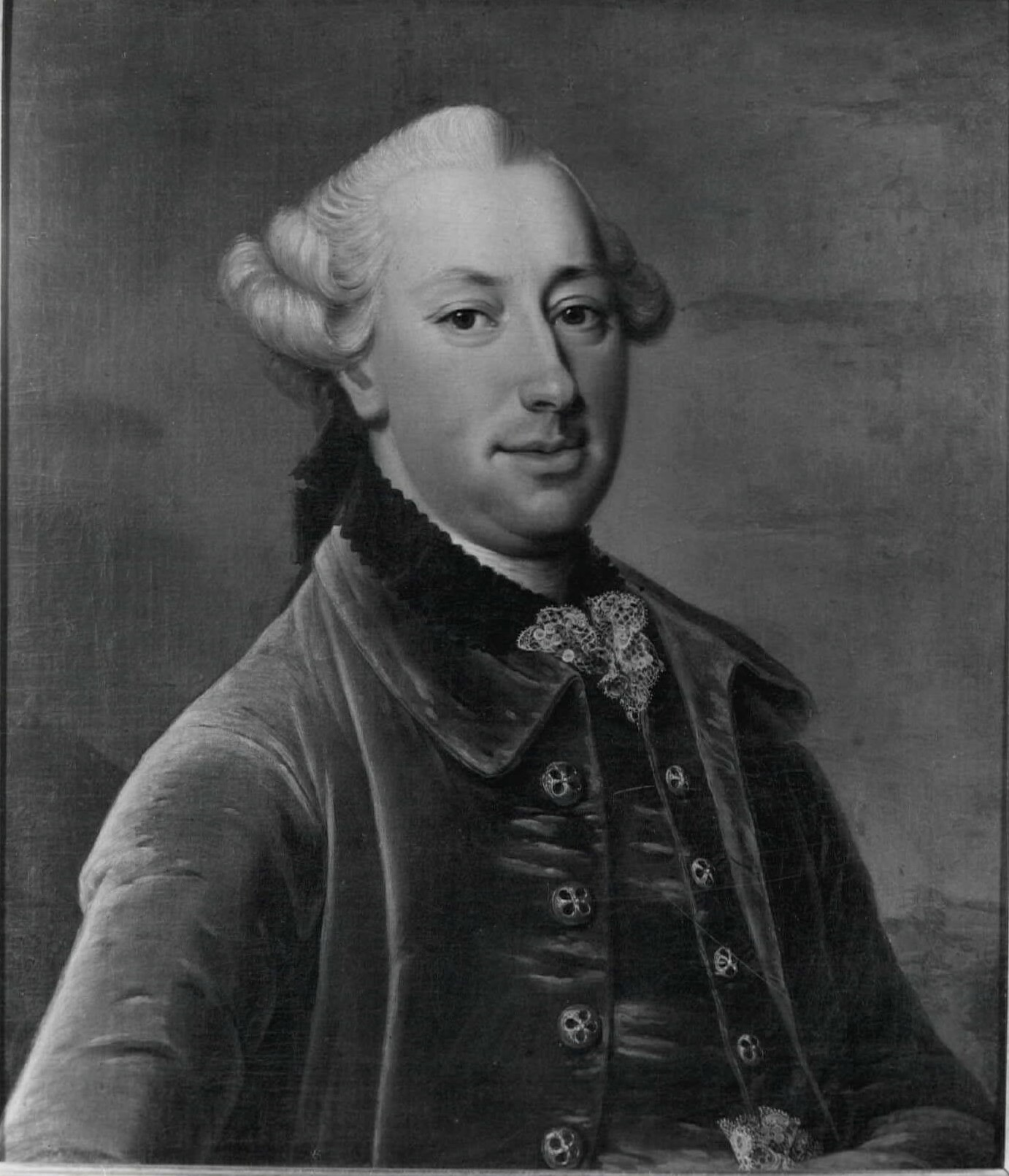
- Portrait by Andreas Brünniche
- Born: 9 October 1732; Berritzgaard, Denmark
- Died: 24 October 1804 (aged 72); Hvidkilde, Denmark
- Father: Abraham Lehn

Poul Abraham Lehn (9 October 1732 – 24 October 1804), Baron of Lehn and Baron of Guldborgland, was a feudal baron of the Danish and Norwegian nobility and one of the largest landowners of his time in Denmark.

Baron Poul Abraham Lehn inherited and purchased a number of estates during his lifetime. He created three separate baronies through these estates: Lehn, Guldborgland, and Sønderkarle. With no surviving sons, he left created these baronies for his daughters who were either transferred the properties during his lifetime or inherited them after his death.

== Biography ==
Poul Abraham Lehn was born on 9 October 1732 to Abraham Lehn (1701–1757) and Sophie A. Edinger (1700–1768) at Berritzgaard. His father was an estate owner and collector of books and art. In 1731, Abraham Lehn and his brother Johan Lehn (1705–1760) had been ennobled; this made Poul Abraham Lehn noble as well when he was born in 1732.

After the death of his father in 1757, he inherited the estates Berritzgaard and Højbygård on Lolland. When his uncle Johan Lehn died in 1760, he acquired the estates of Hvidkilde, Nielstrup, and Lindskov (Lehnskov) on Funen. In 1775, he purchased Orebygaard.

In 1780 and 1784, based on his family estates, Lehn was made feudal baron of the Barony of Lehn and of the Barony of Guldborgland, respectively. In 1781, he created the Barony of Lehn by combining his estates on Funen of Hvidkilde, Nielstrup, and Lehnskov. This barony was given to his eldest daughter, Sophie Amalie Rantzau-Lehn, and eventually passed into freehold in 1925. The Barony of Guldborgland was established in 1784 by combining the Berritzgaard and Orebygaard estates; it became a freehold property in 1922.

In 1784, Baron Poul Abraham Lehn acquired Lungholm. In 1803, Højbygaard and Lungholm were converted into an entailed estate (stamhus) under the name Baroniet Sønderkarle for his daughter, Johanne Frederikke Lehn. The legal effect of a stamhus was that the estate could neither be sold, mortgaged, or divided between heirs.

== Personal life ==
On 22 May 1761, he married Erica Christine de Cicignon (1744–1796) at Nakkebølle. She was the daughter of Johan Frederik de Cicignon (1701–1765). They had the following children:

- Johan Lehn (1763–1766)
- Sophie Amalie Rantzau-Lehn, Baroness of Lehn and of Guldborgland (1764–1834), married Hans Rantzau (1764–1808), who adopted the name Rantzau-Lehn and inherited the baronies; issue
- Margrethe Krabbe Lehn, Baroness of Lehn and of Guldborgland (1766–1789), married Hartvig Gottfried von Barner (1763–1811); issue
- Erica Christine Lehn, Baroness of Lehn and of Guldborgland (1771–1804)
- Elisabeth Catharina Lehn, Baroness of Lehn and of Guldborgland (1772–1802), married (1) Caspar Hermann von Krogh of Søholt; no issue; (2) Frederik Julian Christian von Bertouch (1764–1831); issue, who adopted the name Bertouch-Lehn and was made Baron of Sønderkarle
- Johanne Frederikke Lehn, Baroness of Lehn and of Guldborgland (1775–1805) married Frederik Wallmoden of Fuglsang Manor.

Baron Poul Abraham Lehn died on 24 October 1804 at one of his estates, Hvidkilde. He was buried in Sørup.
