= Berritzgaard =

Coordinates: 54°49′17″N 11°39′56″E

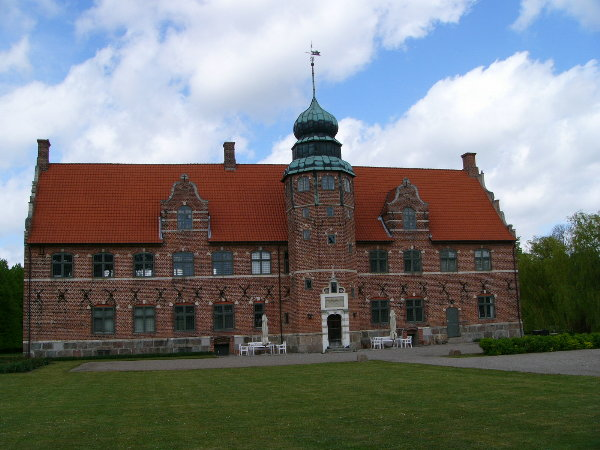
- Berritzgard in 2007

General information
- Type: Estate
- Architectural style: Dutch Renaissance
- Classification: National listing of historic places
- Location: Lolland, Denmark
- Completed: 1382
- Renovated: 1890s

The Berritzgaard estate and manor house is one of the largest and best preserved manor houses on the island of Lolland in Denmark. The estate can be traced back to 1382, to its first owner, Markvard Pøiske. The estate developed from a village called "Berith", situated where the Berritzgaard manor house now stands. Later, the Huitfeldt family purchased the estate. Jacob Huitfeldt and his wife Lisebeth Friis built the present manor house that was constructed by Hans van Steenwinckel the Elder. Lisebeth Friis was widowed before the house was finished in 1586.

The style of the house is in the Dutch Renaissance architectural style and Berritzgaard is considered to be the most unspoiled example of a manor house from this style period in Denmark.

== History ==
=== Ownership by the Huitfeldt Family, Sale to Abraham Lehn ===
In 1654, Joachim Gersdorff, the widower after Huitfeldt, sold the Berritzgaard estate to Hans Wilhelm von Harstall, who was the "Chosen Prince Christian's" stable master. His son, Christian Ulrich von Harstall, became King Christian V's Master of the Royal Stables. Because of his service to the Kingdom, he was given additional land to add to the Berritzgaard estate. This was the only time in the history of Berritzgaard that the estate was expanded by royal gift. After being widowed, his daughter sold Berritzgaard to Abraham Lehn (the Younger) in 1729. Johan Lehn, Abraham's the Elder's father, had emigrated to Denmark from the Netherlands. The Lehn family made their fortune in the wine trade, grocery trade and in the shipping business, with Abraham Lehn the Elder being the director of the Danish East India Company. Their primary import product was tea from Ceylon.

=== Creation of the Barony of Guldborgland ===
Johan Lehn

Abraham Lehn the Younger's son, Poul Abraham Lehn, created the Barony of Guldborgland from his holdings at Berritzgaard and the purchase of the Oreby Estate in 1775, combining all of his possessions northwest of Sakskøbing. In the 1790s, much work was done on the grounds by Johan Christian Boas, a German landscape architect who brought knowledge on farming and crop rotation to the estate, including the use of clover as a rotation crop. His plans for the gardens at Berritzgaard won national prizes in Denmark.

According to tradition, Poul Lehn's only son out of his four children died when he fell out of a window at the Berritzgaard house, so the Guldborgland barony later went to Poul Lehn's granddaughter. She was Christiane Henriette von Barner, who after a short and very happy, but childless marriage, was widowed in 1811. In 1820 she remarried Colonel Henrik Christian Rosenoern. Now in possession of the Guldborgland Barony, Colonel Henrik Christian Rosenoern was given the title "baron" with the name Rosenoern-Lehn for him and his descendants to bear.

=== Abandonment of the House as a Family House ===
Christiane Henriette had previously decided to move the headquarters of the Barony of Guldborgland to the more beautifully situated Oreby Estate and to restore the rather rundown castle there. To carry this out, Poul Lehn's will, in which he had set aside a considerable sum of money to restore Berritzgaard's big detached wing, had to be changed. This was successful and Berritzgaard was abandoned in 1810 as living quarters for the Rosenoern-Lehn family and was not used as a family house for the next 160 years.

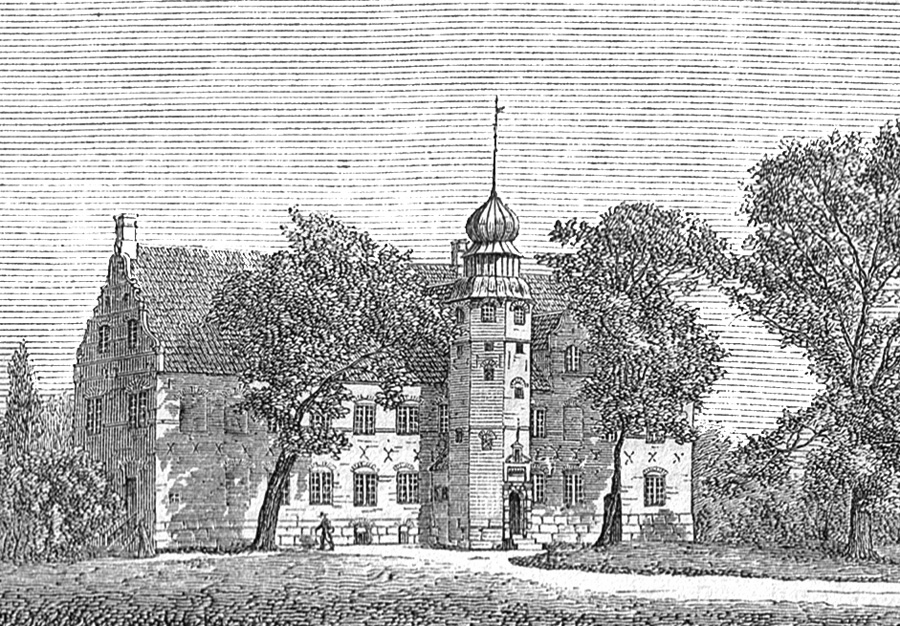
Berritzgard in 1874

The house was left only partly furnished, now and then occupied by staff in the lower part of the house. The run down wing that was supposed to be restored was instead demolished, and Hans van Steenwinckel's fine house was allowed to stand untouched by changing architectural fashions. Occasionally the house was used for other purposes. In 1864 it was used as a hospital during the Danish-Prussian War, and just after World War I it was used as a refugee camp. In 1940-1943 the Danish army had a garrison that was taken over by the German occupation forces. From 1945 to 1949 the house and the grounds were used as a refugee camp for East Germans. In the 1950s, a rug factory was operated on the grounds. Much of the land surrounding the estate were lost in the land redistribution in Denmark that took place in 1919-1921. Many large estates were broken into small plots and leased to farmers through the Danish government.

=== Renovations of the House and Grounds ===
One of the larger known renovations of Berritzgaard was in the 1890s where the existing leaded lights were added to mimic the Rosenborg Castle in Copenhagen and the windows on the first floor were shortened so they would "stand" on the decorative limestone border, which is set into the redbrick wall all around the house. During the same renovation, several blinded windows were re-established. The house was kept in basic repair until 1970 where Christiane Henriette's great-great grandchild (the present owner) converted the house to his private residence with a general restoring and refurnishing of the house.

In the 1950s the public road "Kogangen" was moved from its immediate position north of the house to its present southern location between the house and the farm-building complex thus combining the gardens north and south of the house. At the same occasion the fragmented moat system was cleaned up and extended and a new moat was dug where the public road had run, thus combining the fragments. The old Baroque garden north of the house was cleared of younger tree avenues and a fruit garden thus making room for the original double driveway avenue of lime trees planted sometimes in mid-18th century. This avenue frames the garden room beautifully and by making a "false" perspective gives an impression of a far view in an otherwise completely flat landscape.

=== Complete Renovation and Reestablishment as a Private Residence ===
The tiled roof was restored in the mid 1970s and during the last 30 years the house has been fully restored in respect to the national listing of historic places underwhich the house is placed.

The house is a private residence and is not open to the public.

== Cultural references ==
In 1950 a film was made on the property entitled "Historien om Hjortholm."

== List of owners ==
- (1300- ) Slægten Pøiske
- (1382- ) Markvard Pøiske
- (1400- ) Hartvig Pøiske
- (1417-1478) Hans Pøiske
- (1478-1479) Karen Andersdatter Jernskæg, gift 1) Pøiske
- (1479-1502) Markvard Pøiske
- (1502- ) Erik Olufsen Blaa
- ( -1529) Otto Clausen Huitfeldt
- (1529-1559) Christopher Ottosen Huitfeldt
- (1559-1583) Jacob Christophersen Huitfeldt
- (1583-1631) Lisbeth Friis, gift Huitfeldt
- (1631-1652) Henrik Jacobsen Huitfeldt
- (1652-1654) Øllegaard Huitfeldt, gift Joachim von Gersdorff
- (1654-1680) Hans Vilhelm von Harstall
- (1680-1719) Christian Ulrich von Harstall
- (1719-1724) Dorothea von Harstall og Sophie Charlotte von Harstall, gift * von Körbitz
- (1724-1726) Johan Christoph von Körbitz
- (1726-1729) Sophie Charlotte von Harstall, gift von Körbitz
- (1729-1757) Abraham Lehn
- (1757-1804) Poul Abraham Lehn
- (1804-1809) Christiane Henriette Hartvigsdatter von Barner, gift 1) Kaas, 2) Rosenørn
- (1809-1811) Otto Ditlev Kaas-Lehn
- (1811-1820) Christiane Henriette Hartvigsdatter von Barner, gift 1) Kaas, 2) Rosenørn
- (1820-1847) Henrik Christian Rosenørn-Lehn
- (1847-1860) Christiane Henriette Hartvigsdatter von Barner, gift 1) Kaas, 2) Rosenørn
- (1860-1892) Otto Ditlev Rosenørn-Lehn
- (1892-1899) Christian Conrad Sophus Rosenørn-Lehn
- (1899-1935) Frederik Marcus Rosenørn-Lehn
- (1935-1970) Christian Carl Otto Rosenørn-Lehn
- (1970- ) Fredrik Andreas Rosenørn-Lehn
