= Conrad Ditlev Reventlow =

Danish landowner, Supreme Court justice and diocesan governor of the Diocese of Zealand

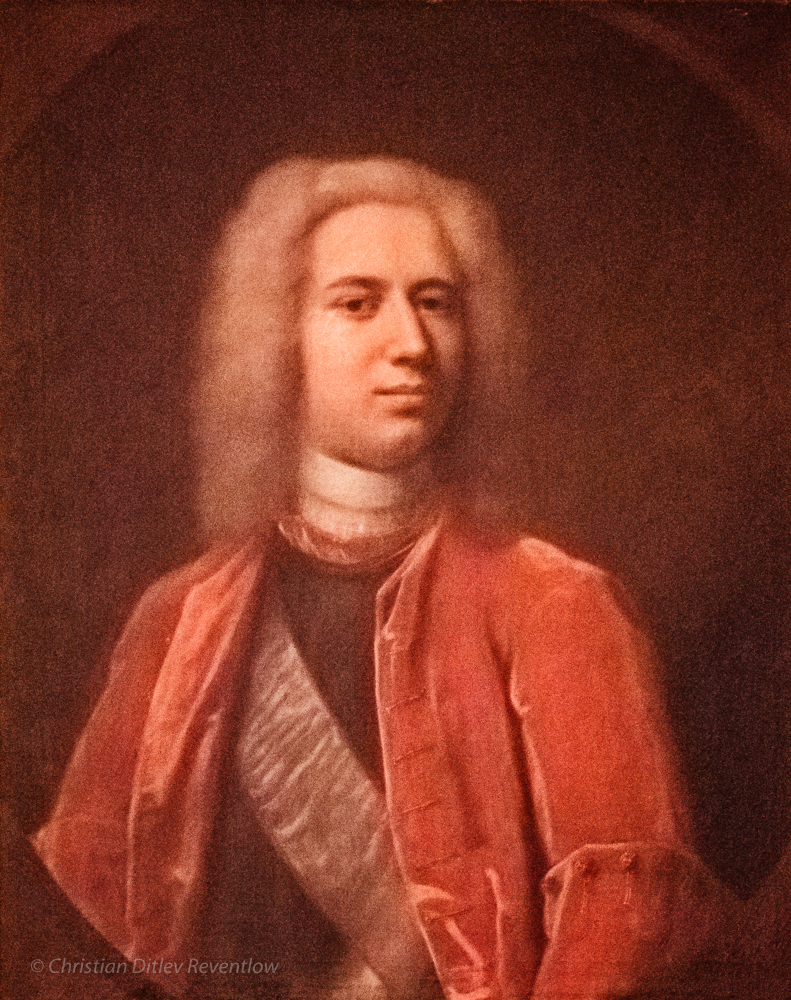
- Reventlow painted by Balthasar Denner.

Diocesan governor of Zealand
- In office 1749–1750
- Monarch: Frederick V
- Preceded by: Niels Gersdorff
- Succeeded by: Adolph Andreas von der Lühe
- Constituency
Diocesan offices
Diocesan Governor of Aalborg
In office 1730–1746
Monarch	Frederick V
Preceded by	Christian Reitzer
Succeeded by	Jørgen Bille

Personal details
- Born: 23 July 1704 Frankfurt am Main, Hesse; Holy Roman Empire
- Died: 24 July 1750 (aged 46) Rønne, Denmark; Denmark-Norway
- Occupation: Supreme Court justice, diocesan governor

Conrad Ditlev Reventlow (23 July 1704 – 24 July 1750) was a Danish government official, Supreme Court justice and privy councillor. He ended his career as Diocesan Governor of Zealand and County Governor of Copenhagen. He succeeded his father to the countship of Reventlow in Sønderjylland and the barony of Brahetrolleborg on Funen as well as the entailed estates (Danish: Stamhuss, sing. stamhus) Krenkerup on Lolland and Frisenvold in Nørrejylland.

== Early life and education ==
Reventlow was born on 23 July 1704 in Frankfurt am Main, the son of Christian Detlev Reventlow and Benedicte Margrethe von Brockdorff Rediger.

He studied abroad, having matriculated in 1722 in Leiden.

== Career ==
Reventlow was appointed chamberlain as early as 1721. From 1725 to 1731, he served as county governor of Haderslev. In 1737, he became a Knight of the Order of the Dannebrog. In 1730, he was awarded the title of gehejmeråd. In 1747, he becamre a councillor (deputeret) in General-Landets Økonomi- og Kommercekollegium and promoted to gehejmekonferensråd.

In 1748, he became a Supreme Court justice. In 1749, he was appointed as Diocesan Governor of Zealand and County Governor of Copenhagen.

== Property ==
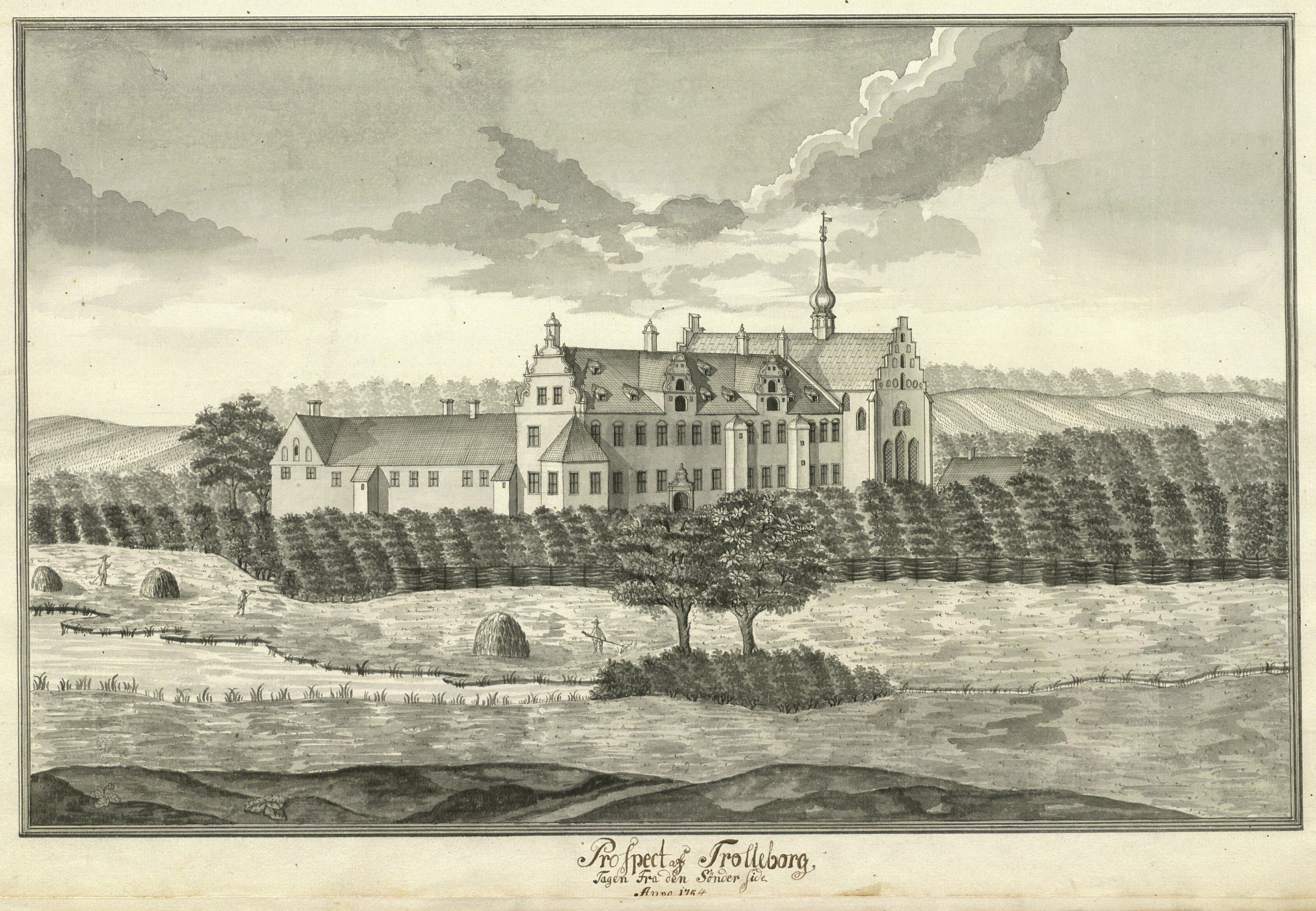
Johan Jacob Bruun. Brahetrolleborg viewed from the south, 1754.

Reventlow succeeded his father to the countship of Reventlow in Sundeved, the barony of Brahetrolleborg and the enailed estate (Danish: Stamhus) Krenkerup (Lolland) and Frisenvold (Mørrejylland). His younger brother Christian Ditlev Reventlow succeeded their father to the countship of Christianssæde.

Reventlow had already been put in charge of managing the Brahetrolleborg estate in the first half of the 1720s. With the assistance of the estate manager Frederik Bagger, he had both added more land and significantly improved the management of the estate.

In 1744, Reventlow bought Vrusgaard and merged it into Frisenvold.

== Personal life ==
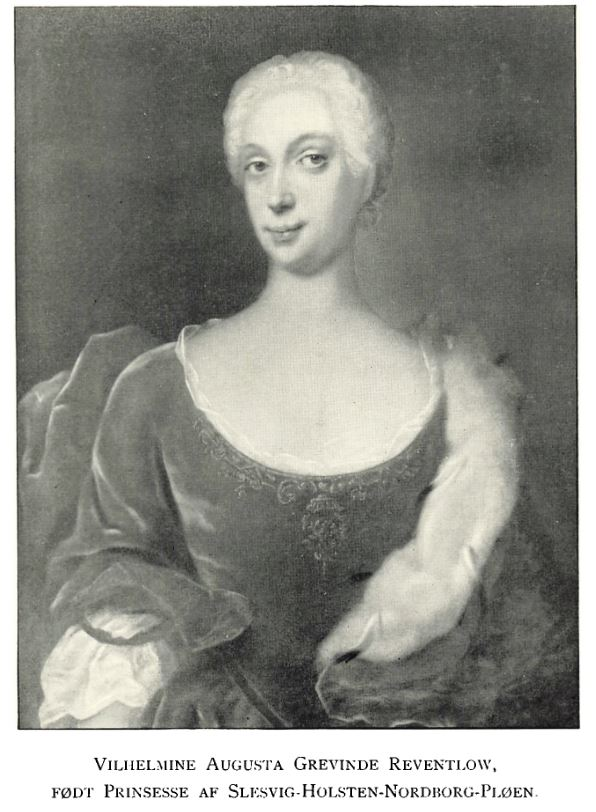
Vilhelmine Augusta of Slesvig-Holsten-Nordborg-Plön painted by Balthasar Denner.

On 20 September 1731. Teventlow married to Princess Vilhelmine Augusta of Slesvig-Holsten-Nordborg-Plön (1704–1749). She was a daughter of Prince Christian Carl and Dorothea Christine von Aichelberg. Reventlow's wife bore him 10 children of which six survived to adulthood.

Reventlow lost his wife in 1740. In 1750, hebegan the construction of a burial chapel in connection with Dybøl Church. The burial chapel was still far from finished when he died later that year. Reventlow insisted on making an official trip to Bornholm, even though he had been having health problems for some time. He died on 24 July 1750 in Rønne. When the burial chapel was finally completed in 1757, Frederik Bagger was tasked with having the coffins of Reventlow, his wife and their four deceased children transferred to Dybbøl. This was done by a vessel he chartered in Faaborg and had decorated with a 30-ell long pennant and a large flag of black fabric with a white cross. The funeral ceremony took place on 20 May 1757. The burial chapel is constructed as an appendix to the chancel from where it can be reached via an opening with a wrought-iron grille. The exterior of the burial chapel is decorated with pilasters and quoins at the corners. Above the door is a sandstone tablet with an inscroption and the Reventlow family's coat of arms. The sarcophaguses of Reventlow and his wife are executed in sandstone with crucifixes and sculls as ornamentation on the lits and the coat of arms of the Reventlow family on the sides.

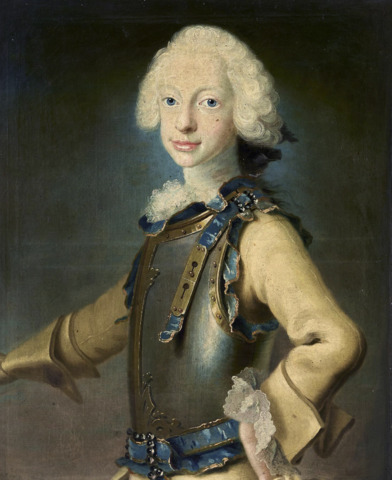
Reventlow's son Christian Ditlev af Reventlow (1735–1759).

Reventlow was survived by six of his ten children. His son Christian Ditlev Reventlow (1735–1759) inherited his estates, He married to Ida Lucie Scheel von Plessen (1740–1792) but died without issue just 24 years old.

Reventlow's eldest daughter Dorothea Frederikke Benedicte Reventlow (1734–1776) married to Gustav Frederik von Ysenburg-Büdingen-Büdingen (Ysenburg) (1715–1768). The second-eldest daughter Conradine Augusta Reventlow (1736–1809), married to Conrad Detlev Knut-Conradsborg (1730–1805). The third daughter Christiane Caroline von Reventlow (1739–1762) married to Christian Frederik von Holstein-Ledreborg (1735–1799). The fourth daughter Sophie Magdalene Reventlow (1741–1811) married to Nicolaus Maximilian von Gersdorff (1725–1802). The fifth and youngest daughter Frederikke Reventlow (1737–1820), married to Detlef Christian Reventlow (1724–1808) was married to Detlef Christian Rumohr (1724–1808).

== Awards ==
In 1730, Reventlow was created a Knight of the Order of the Dannebrog. In 1750, he was awarded the Ordre de l'Union Parfaite.
