= Brahetrolleborg =

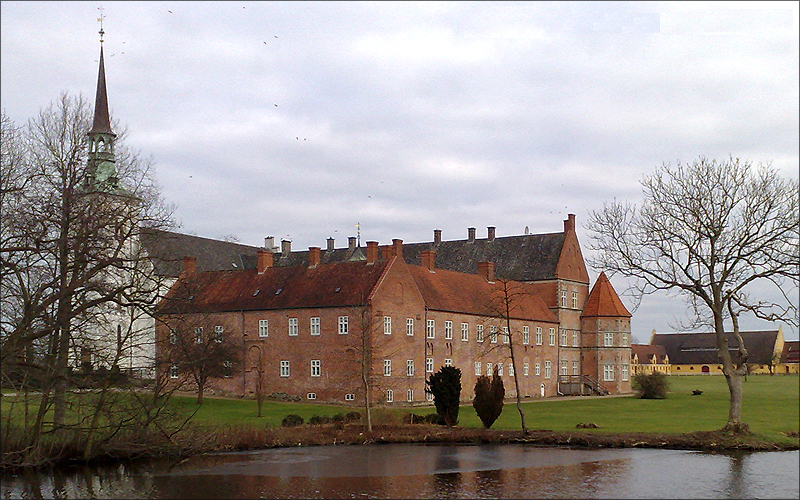
- Brahetrolleborg in 2009.
- Interactive map of the Brahetrolleborg area
- Former names: Holme Abbey (1172–1536); Rantzauholm (1568–1667)

General information
- Location: Faaborg-Midtfyn Municipality, Denmark
- Coordinates: 55°09′N 10°22′E
- Owner: Catharina Reventlow-Mourier Bottke

Brahetrolleborg (lit. 'Brahetrolle Castle') is a castle about 10 kilometres north-west of Fåborg on the Danish island of Fyn. Before the Reformation, the structure was a Cistercian monastery known as Holme Abbey (Danish: Holme Kloster; Latin: Insula Dei). After the reformation, the property was renamed Rantzausholm in 1568 before receiving its current name in 1667. The estate has been owned by the Reventlow family since 1722. It is currently owned by Catharina Reventlow-Mourier, the 9th generation of the family. Together with the neighboring Brændegård property, the estate covers a total of 2607 hectares, much of which is forest.

The oldest parts of the three-winged main building date from the 14th and 15th centuries. The west wing (1498) was expanded for Heinrich Rantzau in 1568 and the east wing was heightened by Kaj Rantzau in 1620. The church, which forms the fourth wing of the complex, dates to the 13th century. The three-winged main building, the adiacent three-winged home farm (ladegård), a small half-timbered building, a former fairy (1679 and later) are all listed on the Danish register of protected buildings and places. The nearby Brahetrolleborg Eatermill and Brahetrolleborg Hospital are also heritagelisted.

== History ==
=== Holme Abbey ===
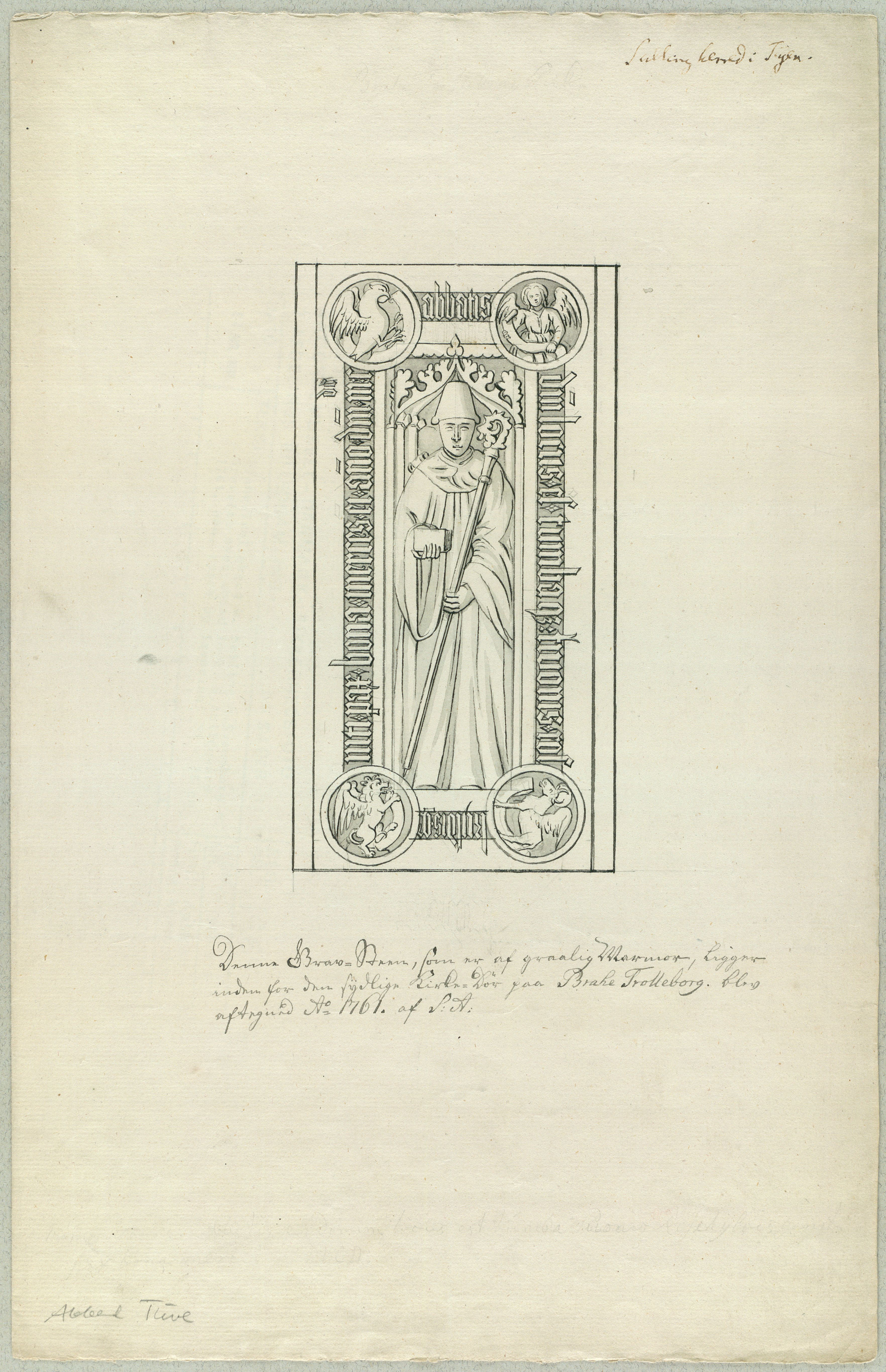
Drawing by Søren Abildgaard (1761) of the ledgerstone of Abbot Tuo in Brahetrolleborg Church.

The abbey was founded and settled in 1172 from the Cistercian Herrevad Abbey in Scania, now in Sweden, of which it was a daughter house. The monastery was initially constructed on directly on the lake of Nørresø, perhaps on a small island, hence the abbey's Latin name: Insula Dei (lit. 'Island of God'). The original building was destroyed in a fire in 1243 and the abbey was moved to the location of the current castle. In 1288, 1324, and again in 1414 the privileges of the abbey were confirmed and expanded. Although the abbey was of relatively distinguished in the Middle Ages, little of its history survives as its archive has been lost.

After the Reformation in Denmark, the monastery, along with all other religious properties, became a property of the crown. In 1538, the property was leant to Clemens von der Wisch for 9,000 Lübeck Marks. In exchange, von der Wisch was to oversee the maintenance of the remaining monks at the abbey. In 1539, the monastery was leant to Christoffer Johansen Lindenov, who was to maintain the property, but no mention of the monks was made in his lease. It is likely that the abbey was quickly vacated by the Cistercian monks in the wake of the reformation.

In 1540, Jakob Hadenberg purchased the property from the crown. After Jakob's death, his widow Sophie Lykke maintained the property until 1551 when it was reacquired by the crown. The crown reimbursed Sophie the 42,000 Lübeck Marks her late husband had paid for the property, but ordered that she return the object which they had removed from the property, including: some lead, a bell, and other ornaments. She was also required to compensate the crown for lands which had been sold off from the property and for the deterioration and demolition of some of the monastery's buildings which had occurred under her ownership. After the property had been reacquired by the crown, it was managed by Eskil Oxe and then Queen Dorothea of Saxe-Lauenburg.

=== Rantzaushol, 1667– ===
The crown maintained ownership of the property until 1568 when Frederick II sold it to Heinrich Rantzau for 55,000 rigsdaler. The deed allowed Heinrich to establish an estate on the former abbey's grounds to be inherited by his male descendants. The estate was thus established as Rantzausholm. After Heinrich's death in 1598, the estate was inherited by his son Breide Rantzau. After Briede's death in 1618, the estate passed to his son Kai Rantzau who died in 1623 and left the estate to his brother Frands. After Frands drowned in 1632, the estate was transferred to Kai Rantzau's only child, Sophie, before being transferred to his widow, Anne Lykke, in 1635. Anne died in 1641 and the property was transferred to her brother Frands Lykke, and then to his son Kai Lykke in 1646. After accusing Queen Sophie Amalie of adultery, Kai Lykke was involved in a scandal in the 1660s which led to his conviction, exile, and the confiscation of all of his properties by the crown. As a result, the estate once again became a possession of the crown in 1661.

After the Carl Gustav wars, the manor had become dilapidated and was in severe disrepair. In 1664, Frederick III granted the estate to his court favourite, the German merchant and politician Christoffer Gabel. In 1667, the estate again was returned to the crown.

=== Brahe/Rrolle family, 1668–1722 ===
In 1668 the estate, along with patronage of its two churches, was deeded to Birgitte Trolle. Brigitte married into the Brahe family, and on 2 February 1672, she was made a baroness and the barony of Brahetrolleborg was formed from the former lands of Rantzauholm and the neighboring Brendegård property. Her brother and heir, privy councilor Corfitz Trolle died in 1684, and therefore when Birgitte died in 1687, the estate and her title were inherited by Corfitz's son, Frederik Trolle. Frederik established several schools on the estate, the last of which remained operational until 1900. After Frederik's death in 1700, Brahetrolleborg passed to his brother Niels Trolle. Niels died in 1722 with no descendants and so the property once again fell back to the crown.

=== Reventlow family ===
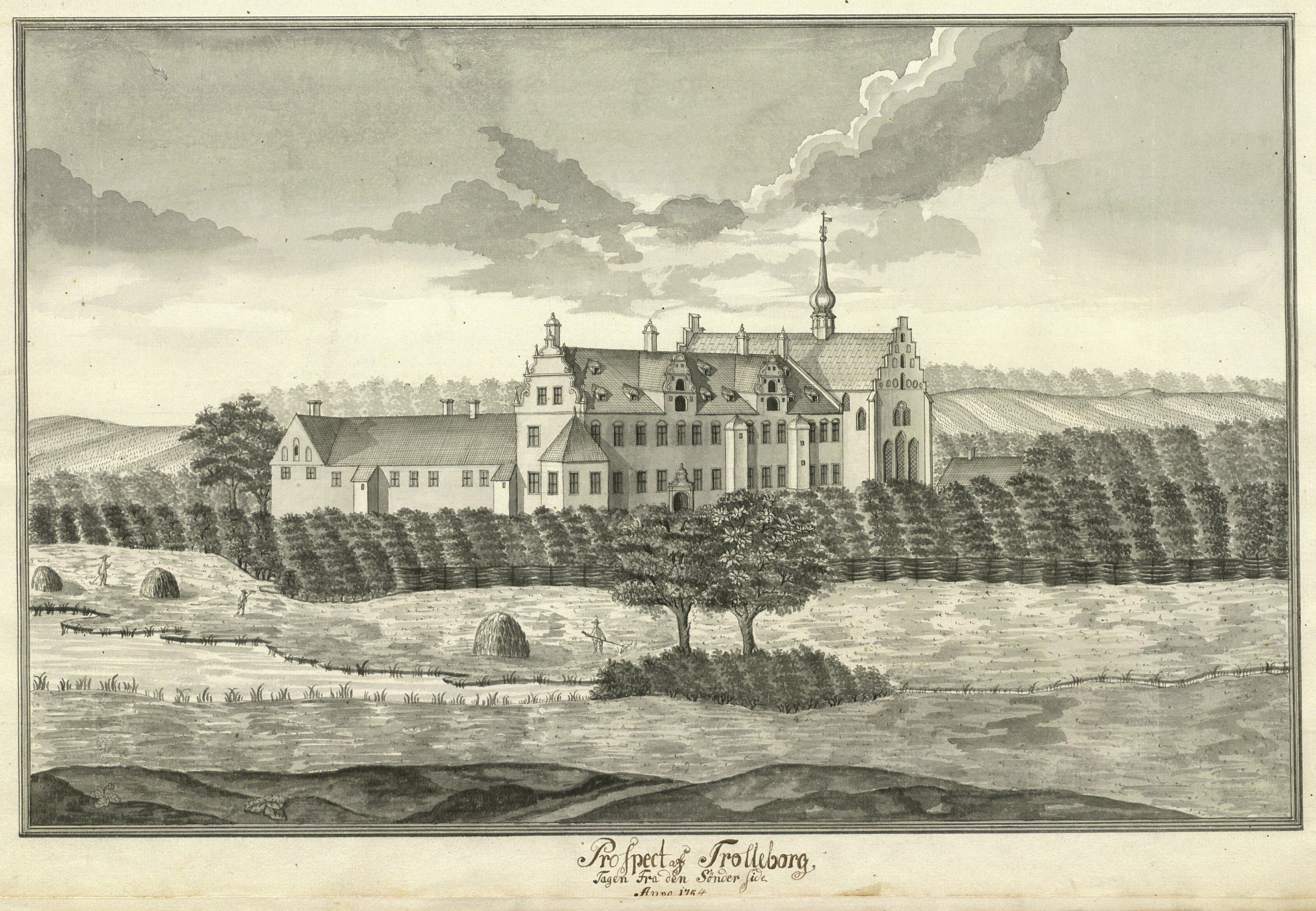
Johan Jacob Bruun. Brahetrolleborg viewed from the south, 1754.

On 28 December 1722, Frederick IV granted Brahetrolleborg to his brother-in-law, Christian Detlev Reventlow (1671–1738).

After Christian Detlev's death, the estate passed to his son Conrad Ditlev Reventlow. He redesigned the garden, improved the management and added more land. He was assisted by the estate manager Frederik Bagger. Conrad Ditlev Reventlow died just46 years old in 1750, not long after he had been appointed as Diocesan Governor of Zealand and President of the Supreme Court. He was buried in the family's burial chapel in Dybøl. Brahetrolleborg and his other estates were passed to his just 16-year-old son Christian Ditlev Reventlow (1735–1759). He died without an heir, and so the property passed to his uncle, Christian Ditlev Reventlow (1710–1775), who already owned Christianssæde on Lolland. It was then inherited by his son Johan Ludvig Reventlow, who introduced a new school system to the area and implemented forestry practices which made Brahetrolleborg famous.

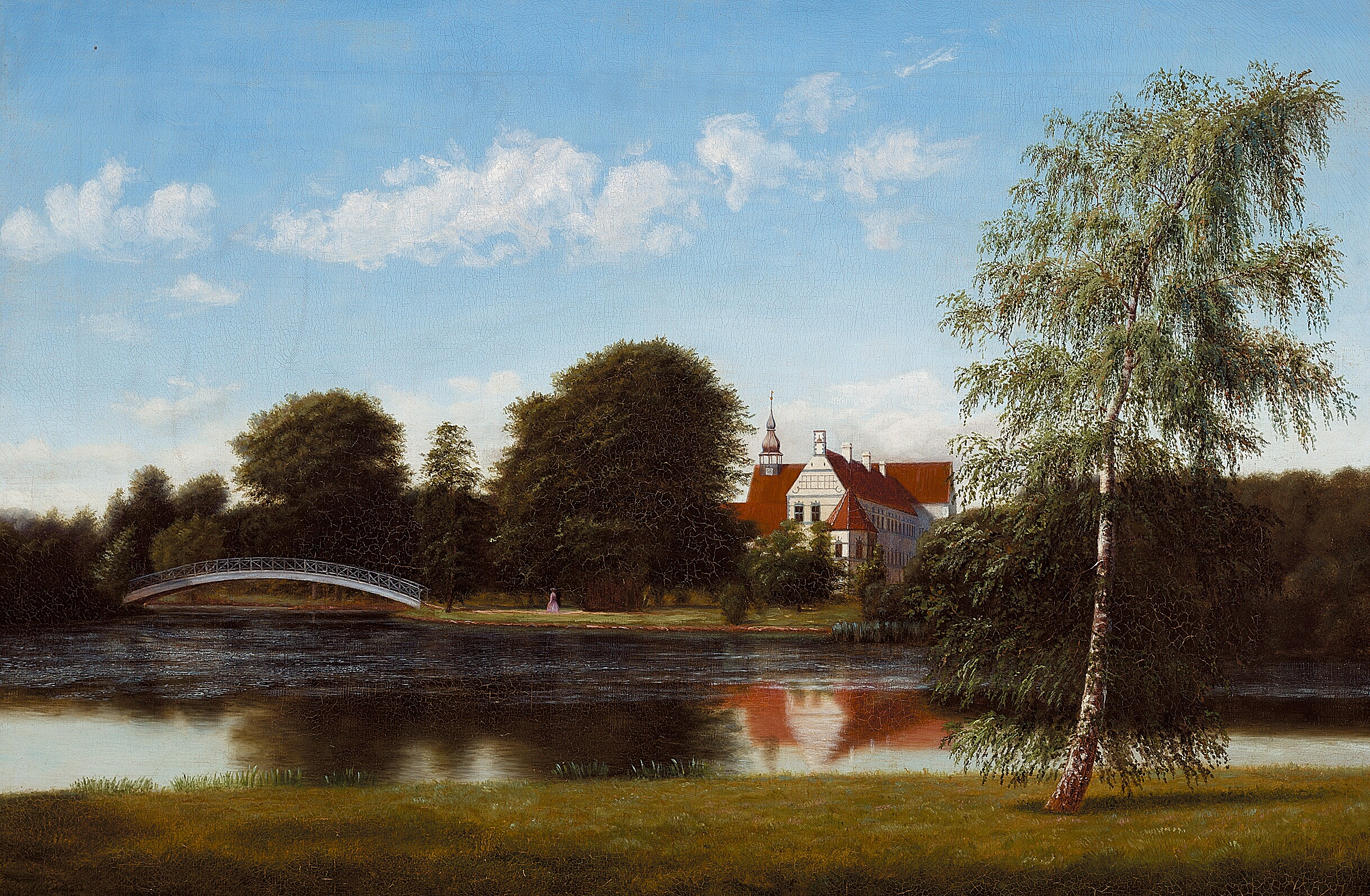
View from Brahetrolleborg, oil on canvas by Ferdinand Richardt, 1867

The estate was inherited by Ditlev Christian Ernst Reventlow in 1854. He died without an heir in 1854, and the property passed to his cousin Ferdinand Otto Carl Reventlow, and then to Ferdinand's son Christian-Einar Ferdinand Ludvig Eduard Reventlow in 1875.

In 1979, the church passed into private ownership.

== Architecture ==
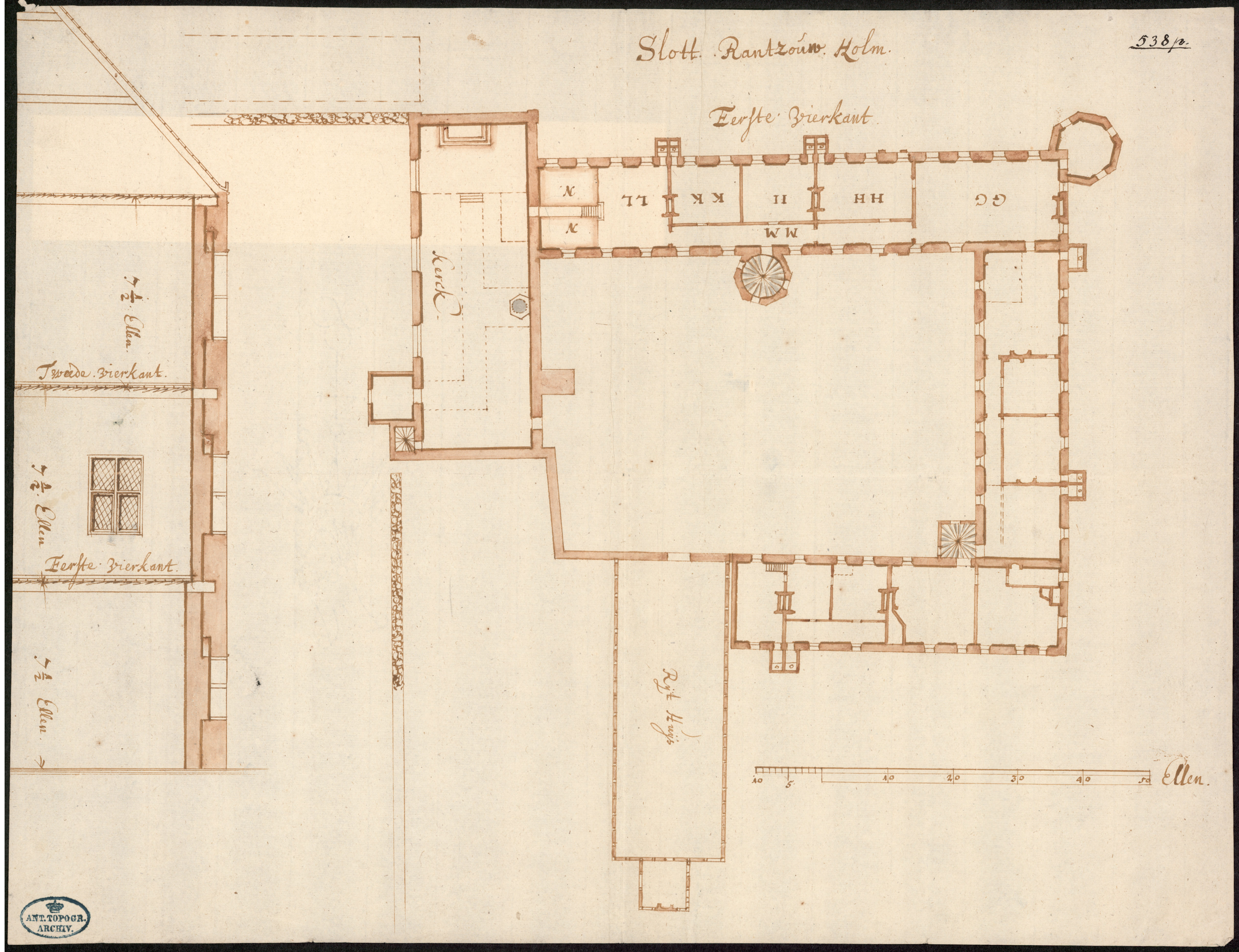
Old plan of the complex.

The former Cistercian church, laid out according to the plan of Saint Bernard, is now the chapel of Brahetrolleborg. The church was constructed between c. 1250 and 1325. The church's tower was an addition made between 1868 and 1870. The church possesses a crucifix sculpted by Claus Berg around 1500.

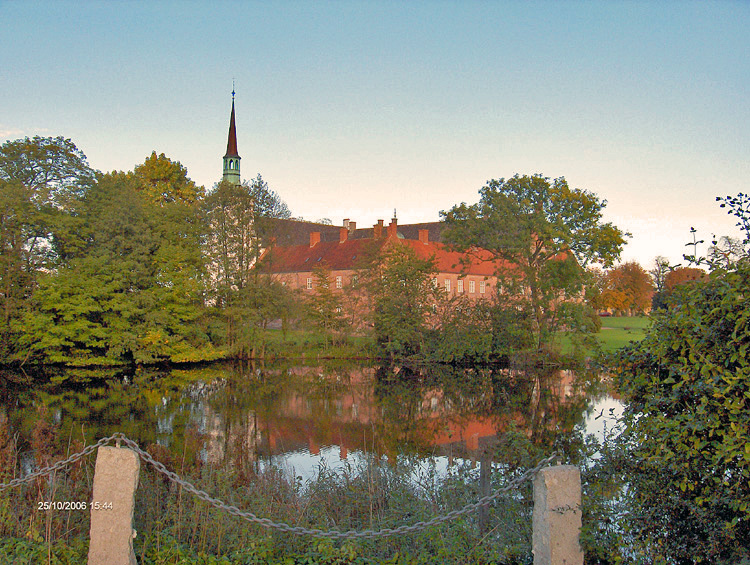
Brahetrolleborg viewed from the lake.

The main structure consists of a partially enclosed quadrangle surrounded by four wings, with the church constituting the northern wing. The west wing contains an inscription in sandstone commemorating the transfer of the property to Heinrich Rantzau in 1568. The west wing was part of the original monastery and is complete with vaulted cellars containing the original well. The southern wing has similar vaulted cellars and was likely constructed as part of the monastery too, but was rebuilt in 1585 by Breide Rantzau who left an inscription on the wing's north wall. The eastern wing was likely built in 1620 by Kai Rantzau. It has two short octagonal towers, one at the south-east corner of the building and the other facing the interior courtyard. The entrance gate outside of the eastern wing has an inscription commemorates the restoration of the building in 1768. By 1870, a square stairwell was installed in the south-east corner of the courtyard and a covered passage was built on the southern side of the courtyard.

On 14 September 1888, a memorial obelisk was erected in honour of Johan Ludvig Reventlow in the property's garden.

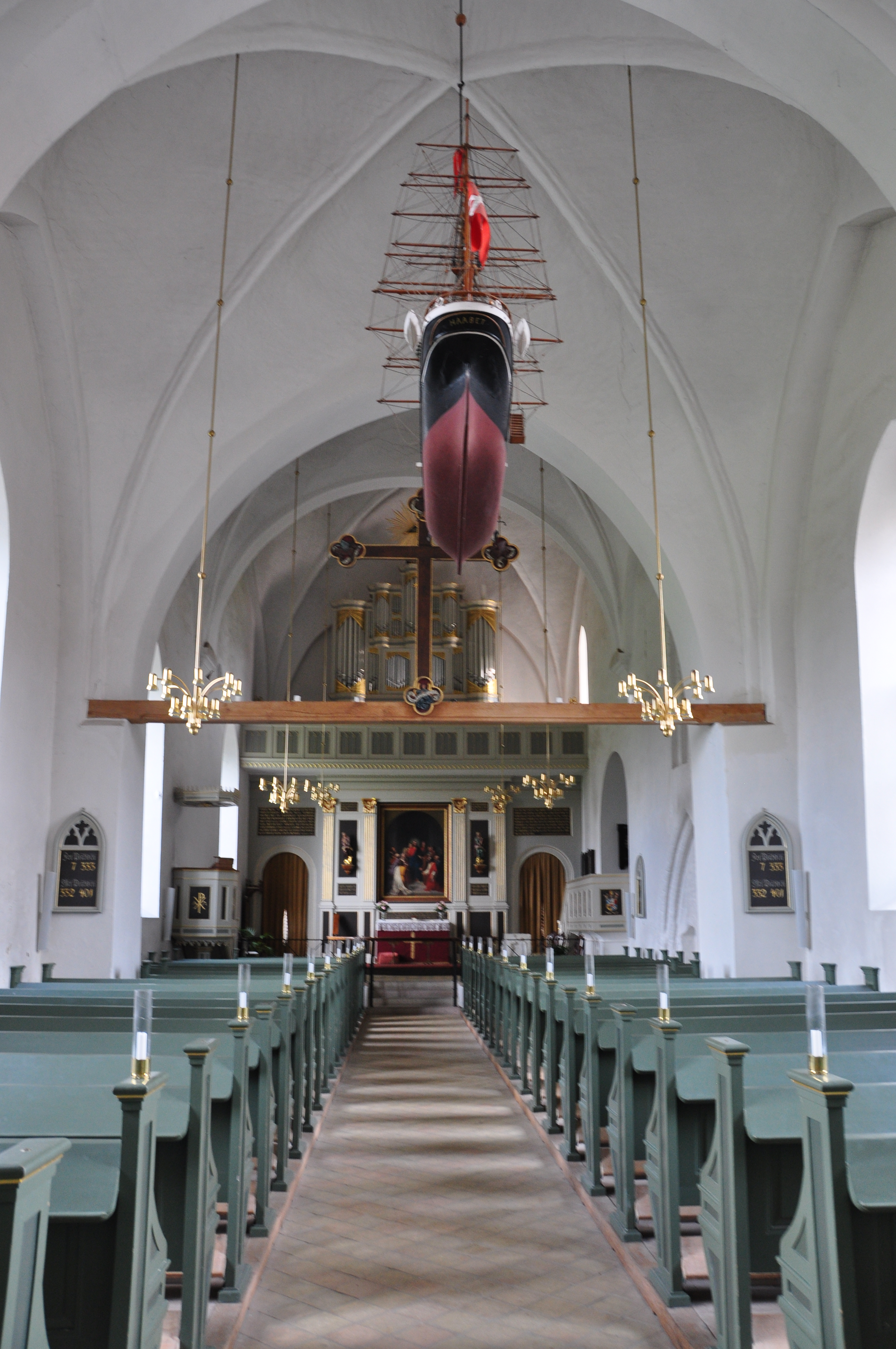
Interior of the church, 2019

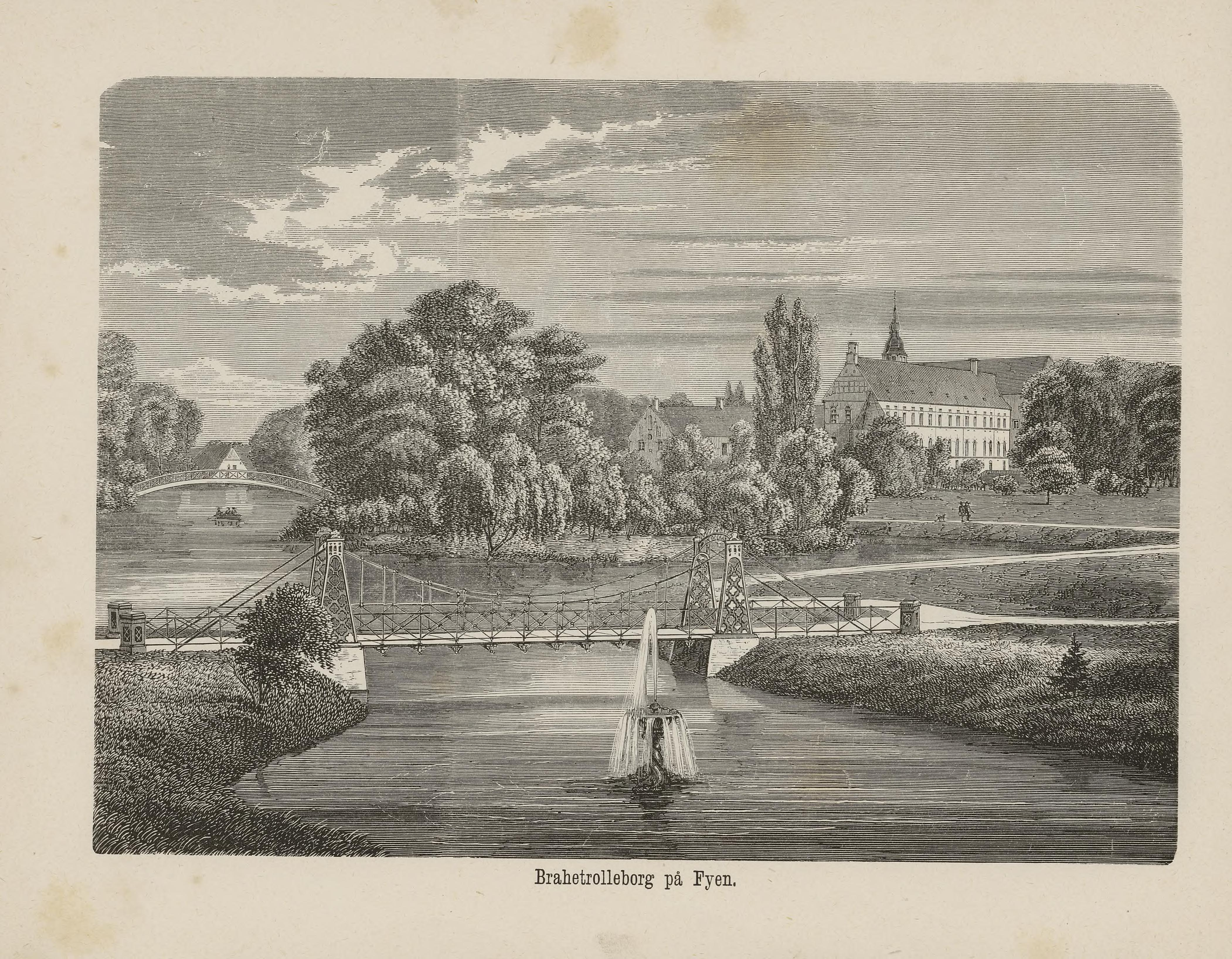
Illustration of Brahetrolleborg, published 1865

== List of owners ==
- 1172–1536, Order of Cistercians
- 1536–1541, Crown land
- 1541–1551, Jacob Hardenberg
- 1551–1568, Crown land
- 1568–1575, Heinrich Rantzau
- 1575–1618, Breide Rantzau
- 1618–1632, Kai Breidesen Rantzau
- 1623–1632, Franzs Breidesen Rantzau
- 1632–1635, Sophie Caisdatter Ulfeldt née Rantzau
- 1635–1641, Anne Lykke
- 1641–1646, Frantz Henriksen Lykke
- 1646–1661, Kai Lykke
- 1661–1664, Crown land
- 1664–1667, Christoffer Gabel
- 1667–1687, Baroness Birgitte Brahe née Trolle
- 1687–1700, Baron Frederik Trolle
- 1700–1722, Baron Niels Trolle
- 1722–1738, Christian Detlev Reventlow (1671–1738)
- 1738–1750, Conrad Ditlev Reventlow
- 1750–1759, Christian Detlev Reventlow (1735–1759)
- 1759–1775, Christian Ditlev Reventlow (1710–1775)
- 1775–1801, Johan Ludvig Reventlow
- 1801–1828, Sybille Reventlow née Schubart
- 1828–1854, Ditlev Christian Ernst Reventlow
- 1854–1875, Ferdinand Otto Carl Reventlow
- 1875–1929, Christian-Einar Ferdinand Ludvig Eduard Reventlow
- 1929–1960, Lucie-Marie Ludovika Anastasia Adelheid Karola Hedevig Haugwitz-Hardenberg-Reventlow
- 1960, Naka Mourier née Reventlow
- 1960–1972, Erik Mourier
- 1972–2009, Ove Detlev Frederik Reventlow-Mourier
- 2009–present, Catharina Bottke née Reventlow-Mourier
