= Amaliegade 12 =

Historic building in Copenhagen, Denmark

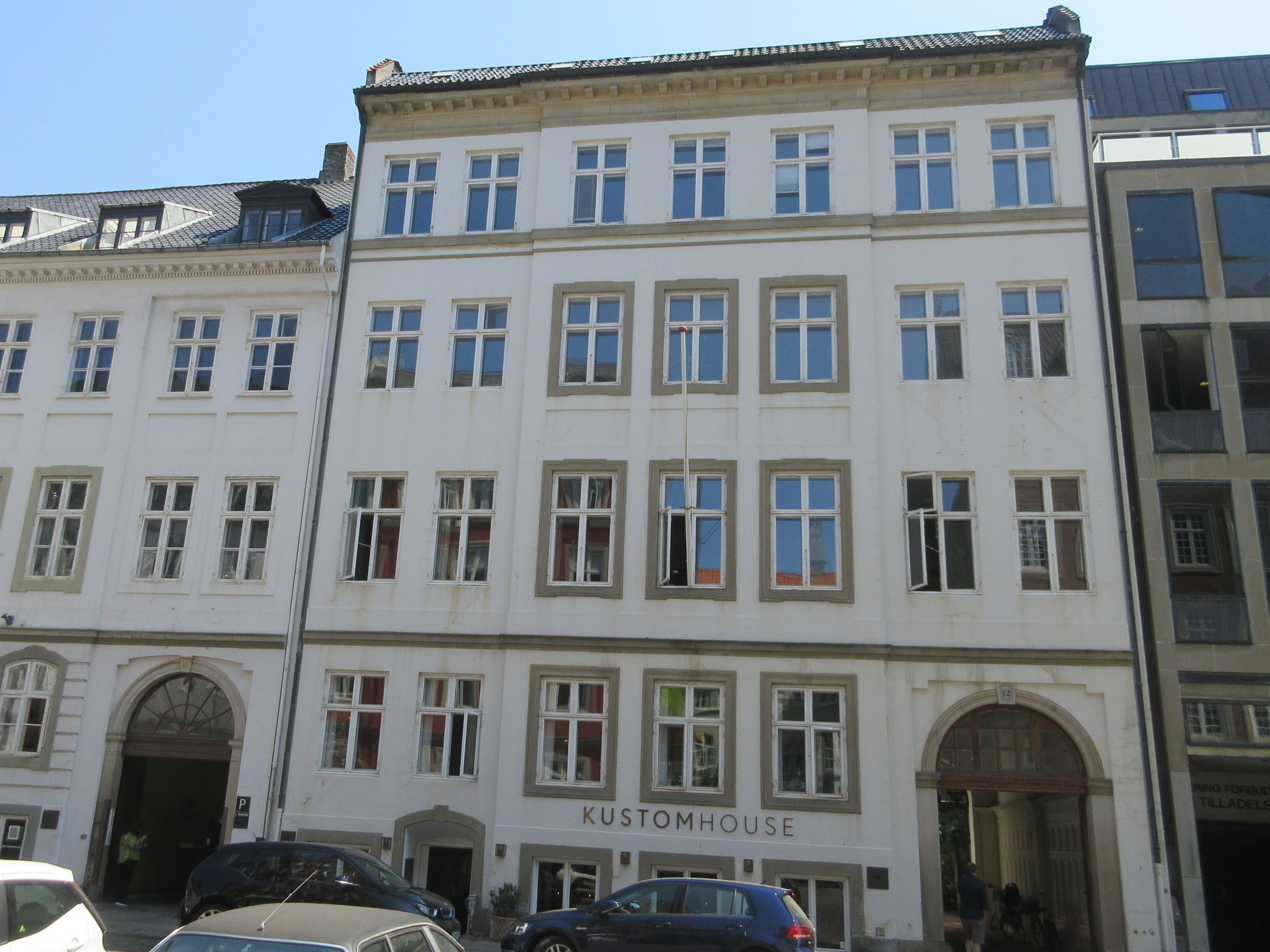
- Interactive map of the Amaliegade 12 area

General information
- Location: Copenhagen, Denmark
- Coordinates: 55°40′57.34″N 12°35′32.27″E
- Completed: 1755

Design and construction
- Architect: Nicolai Eigtved

Amaliegade 12 is a historic property in the Frederiksstaden Quarter of central Copenhagen, Denmark. Count Christian Ditlev Frederik Reventlow lived in the building when he was appointed prime minister in 1797 and it has also housed the American diplomatic mission to Denmark. The law firm Moltje-Leth Advokater is now based in the building. The building was listed on the Danish registry of protected buildings and places in 1918.

== History ==
=== Early history ===
Amaliegade 12 was built between 1753 and 1755 by Nicolai Eigtved for the timber merchant Dittleff Lindenhoff. Eigtved had also created the overall plan for the new Frederiksstaden district just a few years earlier.

In the new cadastre of 1756, the property was listed as No. 71 L. On Cristian Gedde's district map of St. Ann's East Quarter from 1757, it was marked as No. 319. It was by then owned by one etatsråd baron Wedel.

=== Hauch ===
Adam Wilhelm Hauch, a military officer who was appointed to chamberlain that same year, acquired the building in 1782. He lived in the house until 1785 and went on a longer journey in Europe the following year.

=== Reventlow ===
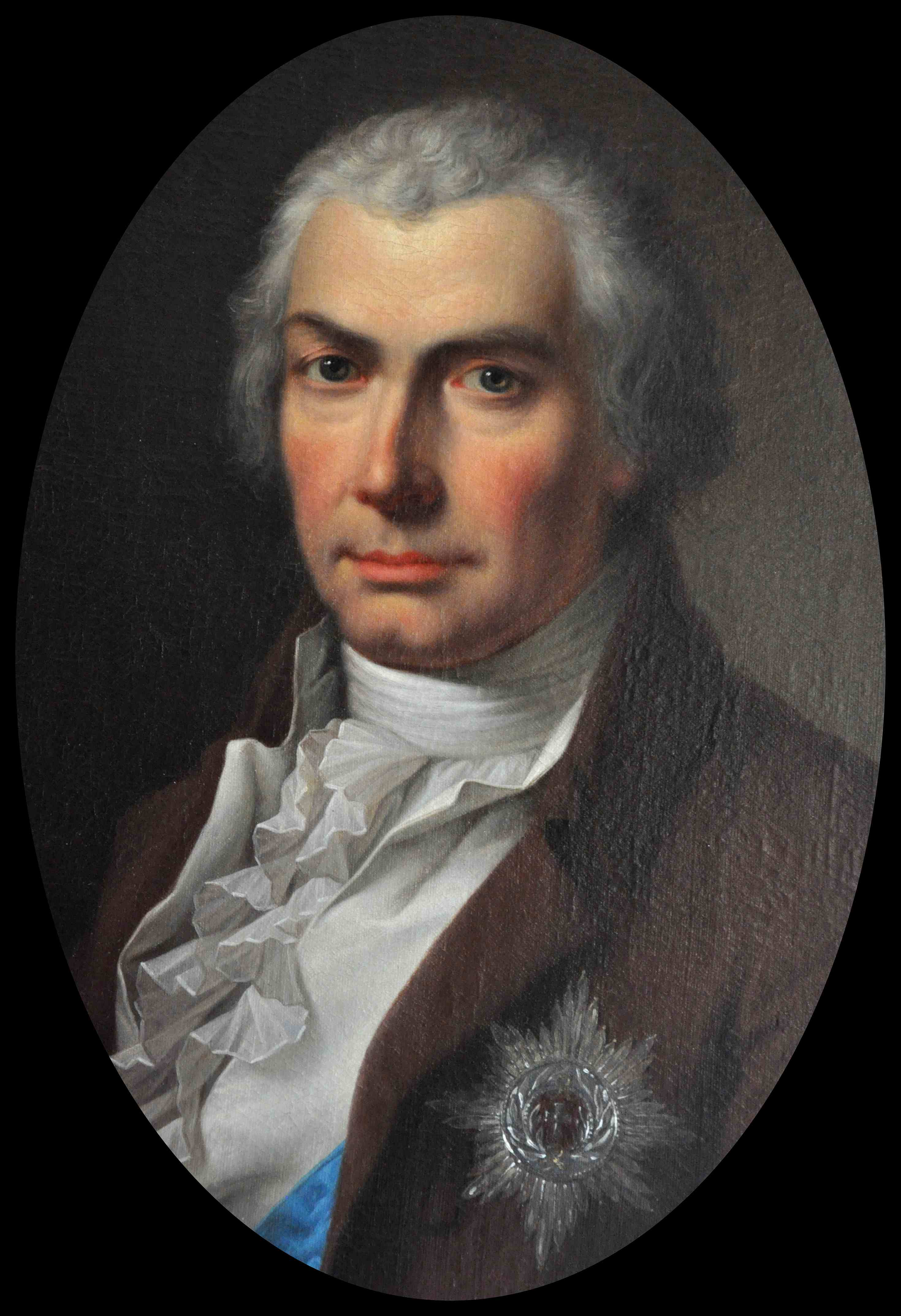
Christian Ditlev Frederik Reventlow

In 1783, Hauch's heirs sold the property for 17,000 Danish rigsdaler to Christian Ditlev Frederik Reventlow for use as his new city home. By royal resolution of 1786, Reventlow received permission to loan the money for the house from a bonded Fideikommis capital acquired from the sale of Lungholm. Reventlow's holdings included Christianssæde and Pederstrup on Lolland and he played a central role in the Danish agricultural reforms of the 1780s and 1790s and was appointed as Minister of the State in 1797.

The property was listed in the new cadastre of 1806 as No. 120 in St. Ann's East Quarter. By royal resolution of 17 August 1815, Reventlow obtained permission to sell the house in Amaliegade. The money would be used for improving his estates on Lolland.

=== 1814–1840 ===
The property was later owned by wholesale merchant Christian Daniel Otte. He was the brother-in-law and business partner of nIELS rYBERG. His grandfather Christian Otte and father Friederich Otte had managed to establish the largest single-proprietor shipping company in Denmark outside Copenhagen. His mother was a member of the Reventlow family.

Notables who were among the residents in the period 1814 to 1840 include Christian Albrecht Jensen (1825) and economist C. G. N. David (1830–1831).

The property was home to four households at the 1834 census. Countess C.M.Bille resided on the ground floor with kammerjunker Carl Ludvig Scheel, volunteer in Generalpostdirectionen Axel Schell, volunteer in Generaltoldkammeret Sigfrid Vector Schell, lady's compansion Nanna Haraldine Bøjesen, one male servant and two maids. Greve Zoldi, an overkammerjunker, resided on the first floor with a governess, a caretaker, a coachman, one male servant and one maid. Johan Frederik Redsted, a captain in the 1st Jutland Infantry Regiment, resided on the second floor with his wife Anna Chr.B.Redsted, their seven children (aged one to 19), one male servant and two maids. F.C.Brandt, a concierge (employed by etatsråd Marcus), resided in the basement with his wife Birthe Feiersiet.

=== 1845 census ===
The property was home to 27 residents in three households at the 1845 census. Fredrik Marcus Knuth resided in the building with his wife Karen Grevinde Af Knuth, their three children (aged three to seven), three male servants and four maids. Count Yoldi, a court official (overkammerjunker), resided in the building with his 68-year-old Jeanne Anna Mattet, three male servants and one maid. Jens Sørensen Lund, a barkeeper and court official, resided in the basement with his wife Ane Maria Jørgens Datter, their four children (aged 14 to 21) and three lodgers.

=== 1850 census ===
At the time of the 1850 census, No. 120 was home to a total of 29 people. Ritmester Hans Juel (1797–) resided with his wife Amalie Christiane Juel (1800–), four children on the second floor. Count Alfonso Maria de Aguirre y Gadea Yoldi (1764–1852), an exiled Spanish count who had been appointed as lord chamberlain in 1828, resided on the first floor. Countess Christiane M. Bille (1771–1844) resided as a widow with two sons, Nanna Haraldine Bojesen and three maids on the ground floor.

=== 1850–1900 ===
The politician Carl Emil Bardenfleth resided in one of the apartments in 1852.

With the introduction of house numbering in Copenhagen in 1859, St. Ann's East Quarter, No. 120 became Amaliegade 12.

=== 20th century ===
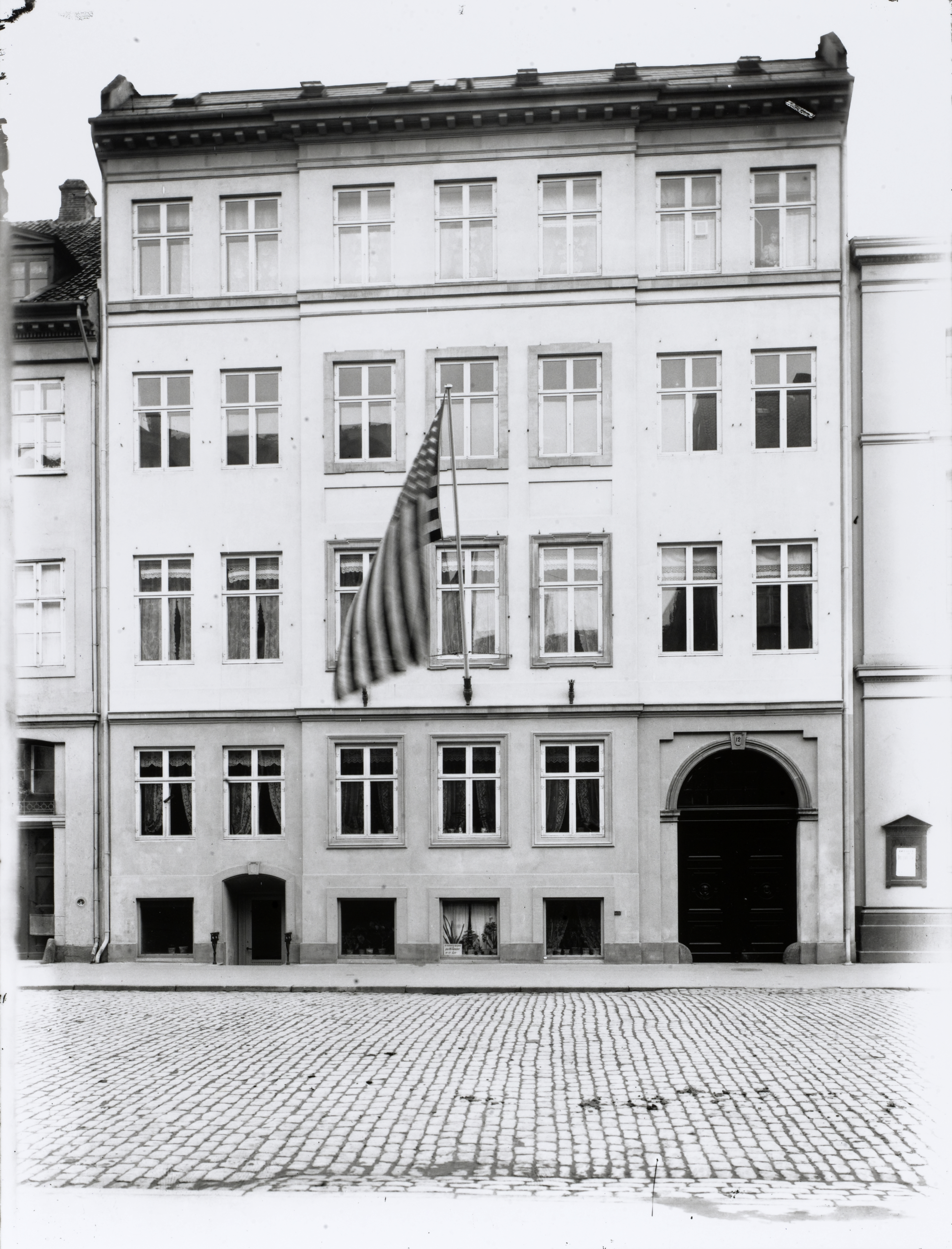
The American diplomatic mission photographed by Peter Elfelt in 1906

The American diplomatic mission was based in the building in the first half of the 20th century. From 1933 to 1936, Ruth Bryan Owen served as American ambassador to Denmark as the first woman to hold the post. From her window in the embassy, she often watched the Royal Life Guards pass through the street. Especially captain Børge Rohde, with whom she later formed a relationship, caught her attention. They were later married in the United States. The embassy was temporarily closed during the Second World War. The embassy left the building when the new embassy on Dag Hammarskjölds Allé was inaugurated in 1954. Ruth Bryan Owen visited Copenhagen for the inauguration, but died from a heart attack the day before the inauguration on 27 May.

== Today ==
The building was owned by Amaliegade 12 APS in 2008. The law firm Moltke-Leth Advokater is now based in the building.

== See also ==
- Listed buildings in Copenhagen Municipality
