= Holme Abbey =

Holme Abbey can refer to:

- Holme Abbey (Denmark) a Cistercian monastery in Denmark, now Brahetrolleborg
- Holme Abbey, Cumbria, also known as Abbeytown, a parish in Cumbria, England
- Holmcultram Abbey, also known as Holm Cultram Abbey or Holme Cultram Abbey, a Cistercian monastery in Cumbria, England
