= Battle of Calcinato =

1706 battle, part of the War of the Spanish Succession

Coordinates: 45.4500°N 10.4167°E

- Part of the War of the Spanish Succession
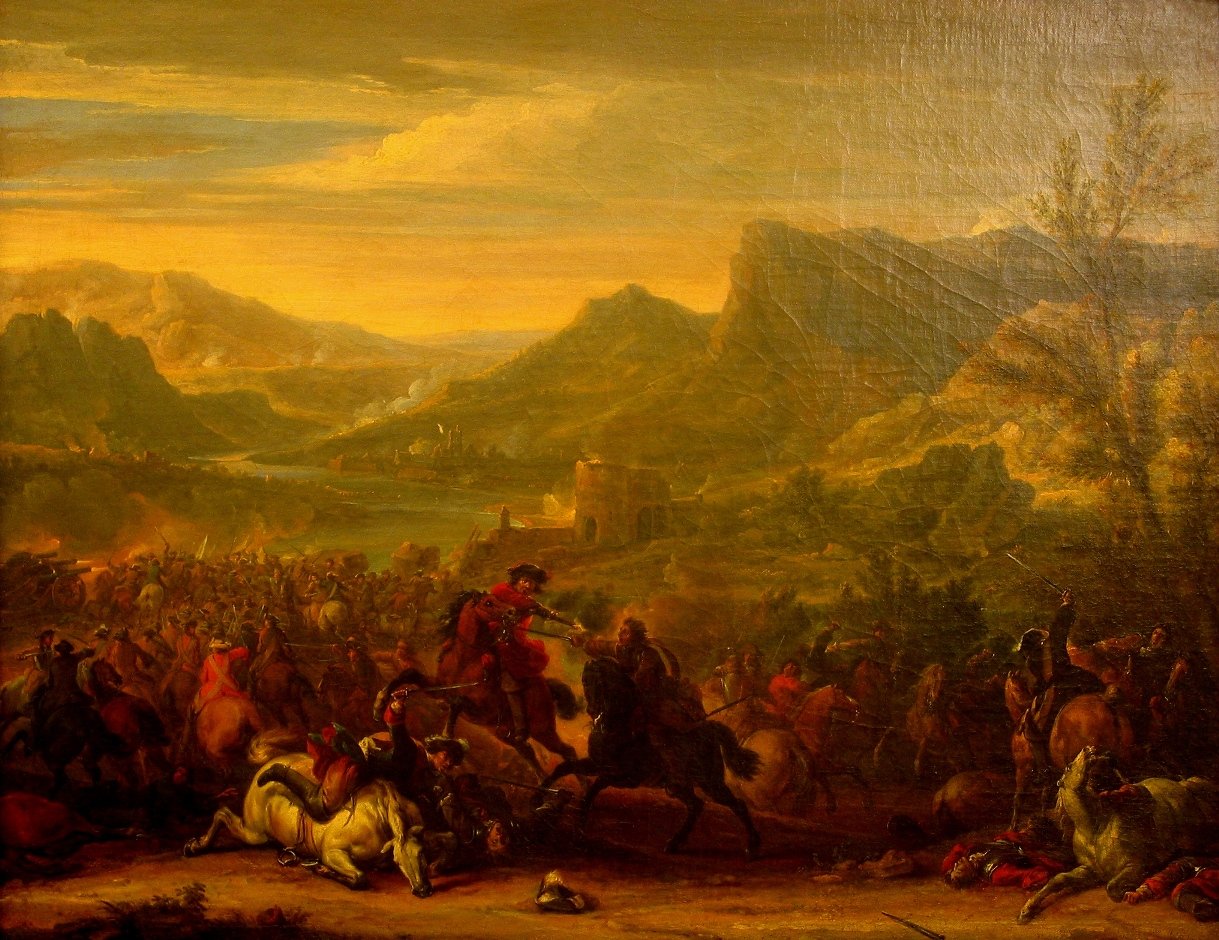
- The Battle of Calcinato by Jean-Baptiste Martin.
Date	19 April 1706
Location	near Calcinato, Italy
Result	French victory

Belligerents
France; Spain	Holy Roman Empire; Prussia

Commanders and leaders
(Kingdom of France) Vendôme	(Holy Roman Empire) von Reventlow

Strength
23,000	10,000–12,000

Casualties and losses
500 killed or wounded	6,000 killed, wounded or captured, plus 6 guns

The Battle of Calcinato took place near Calcinato in Lombardy, Italy on 19 April 1706 during the War of the Spanish Succession. A combined French-Spanish army led by the duc de Vendôme defeated an Imperial force under Graf von Reventlow.

== Background ==
By 1706, France and its allies controlled most of Northern Italy and the Savoyard territories of Villefranche and the County of Savoy, now part of modern-day France. Victor Amadeus retained only his capital Turin, while the Imperial army's attempt to relieve him was blocked at Cassano in August 1705. However, the French did not have enough men to properly invest the city, allowing it to be substantially reinforced and the two armies went into winter quarters.

Northern Italy; 1706 Campaigns in Lombardy (in yellow); key locations

In early 1706, Prince Eugene went to Vienna to obtain men and financing for the next campaign, leaving the Danish general Count von Reventlow in command of the Imperial army at Montichiari and Calcinato. Each position was individually strong but too far apart for mutual support, the 12,000 mostly German troops at Calcinato being 11 kilometres away from their comrades at Montichiari.

The French spent the winter around Castiglione and Mantua; in April, Marshall La Feuillade took 40,000 men to besiege Turin. Vendôme pretended to be ill and short of supplies to give the impression he was not ready to move; then on 18 April, he took 18,000 infantry and 5,000 cavalry and marched on Calcinato overnight, reaching the Canal De Lonato at day break on 19 April.

== Battle ==
While he achieved a considerable degree of surprise, the French had to cross the canal before moving uphill to attack the Imperials. This delay gave von Reventlow time to organise his defence although he was handicapped by the fact most of the Imperial artillery was at Gavardo. Vendôme used his own guns to cover the assault; the French right charged the Imperialist left using their bayonets and pushed it back. Von Reventlow and his cavalry rallied them but then his own right gave way; given the gap between his positions and those at Montichiari, this threatened to cut him off from Salò. He gave the order to withdraw but as was often the case, what started as an orderly retreat soon degenerated into a rout. Imperialist casualties included more than 3,000 dead or wounded, most of their baggage and up to 3,000 taken prisoner.

== Aftermath ==
Although Vendôme captured Gavardo and Salo and drove the Imperial forces into the Trentino valley, Prince Eugene returned in time to rally them; he then led them around Lake Garda and into the Province of Verona. (Note: Part of the Republic of Venice; they were technically neutral but in practice this was ignored by the Imperialists.) The war in Italy now turned against the French; defeat at Ramillies in May meant Vendôme and all available forces were moved to Northern France. At the same time, the Imperial army in Italy was substantially reinforced, the Maritime Powers (Note: Britain and the Dutch Republic) paying for another 20,000 German auxiliaries, while renewing the existing agreement with Prussia.

== Sources ==
- Bodart, Gaston (1908). Militär-historisches Kriegs-Lexikon (1618-1905).
- Bancks, John; The history of Francis-Eugene Prince of Savoy; (1745);
- Lynn, John A. The Wars of Louis XIV, 1667–1714. Longman, (1999). ISBN 0-582-05629-2
- Somerville, Thomas; The History of Great Britain During the Reign of Queen Anne; (1795, Forgotten Books 2018 ed);
