= Battle of Calcinato (1201) =

Battle during the Wars of the Guelphs and Ghibellines

- Part of Guelphs and Ghibellines
Date	9 August 1201
Location	near Calcinato 45°29′00″N 10°24′50″E
Result	Ghibelline victory

Belligerents
Commune of Cremona and Ghibelline exiles from Mantova, Bergamo and Brescia	Commune of Brescia

The Battle of Calcinato was a military engagement during the wars between the Guelphs and Ghibellines. It took place on 9 August 1201 near Calcinato, southeast of Brescia. The Ghibelline forces won.

== Background ==
The 12th century saw the resumption of the efforts by the Holy Roman Emperor Frederick I to reassert his authority in Northern Italy, which some Lombard cities resisted, and sought to preserve their autonomy by siding with Pope Innocent III. Still, a pro-imperial faction of cities also existed, termed the "Ghibelline" party after Waiblingen, one of the early centers of the Hohenstaufen power base. Among them was the city of Cremona. On the other hand, Brescia, a traditional rival of Cremona, belonged to the "Guelphs", named for the Guelph dynasty that took a pro-papal stand after its duke Henry the Lion fell out with Frederick I in 1180.

After the death of Frederick I, his son Henry VI became his successor. When Henry VI died in 1197, the conflict between Guelphs and Ghibelline reached a new phase in the German throne dispute between the Hohenstaufen candidate Philip of Swabia and the Guelph candidate Otto. Although this dispute was largely fought out in Germany itself, Italy continued to be the scene of proxy wars. They mainly revolved around the question of which local noble families were to rule their respective communes as podestá. In Brescia this was Rambertino Buvalelli, while the Ghibellines in Cremona were headed by the Suardi family.

== Battle ==
The forces met on the plain of Albesago di Ponte San Marco (today's San Vito, a hamlet of Bedizzole, about a mile north of Calcinato). The battle was won by the Ghibellines of Cremona, who also captured the Brescian carroccio, the wagon bearing the city signs, a symbol of municipal autonomy and pride. Both communes then concluded in peace and exiles were allowed to return to their home cities.
