= Ponte San Marco–Calcinato railway station =

Railway station in Italy

Ponte San Marco–Calcinato

General information
- Location: Piazzale Stazione 1, 25011; Ponte San Marco, Calcinato, Brescia, Lombardy; Italy
- Coordinates: 45°28′26″N 10°24′33″E
- Operator: Rete Ferroviaria Italiana
- Line: Milano–Venezia
- Platforms: 2
- Tracks: 2
- Train operators: Trenitalia; Trenord

Other information
- Classification: Bronze
Location
- Location within Lombardy Location within Northern Italy Location within Italy

Ponte San Marco–Calcinato (Italian: Stazione di Ponte San Marco–Calcinato) is a railway station serving Calcinato, in the region of Lombardy, northern Italy. The station lies on the Milan–Venice railway and the train services are operated by Trenitalia and Trenord.

== Train services ==
The station is served by the following services:

- Regional services (Treno regionale) Brescia – Desanzano del Garda – Peschiera del Garda – Verona
- Regional services (Treno regionale) Brescia – Verona – Vicenza – Padua – Venice (1x per day)

== See also ==
- History of rail transport in Italy
- List of railway stations in Lombardy
- Rail transport in Italy
- Railway stations in Italy
