= Krenkerup =

Danish manor house

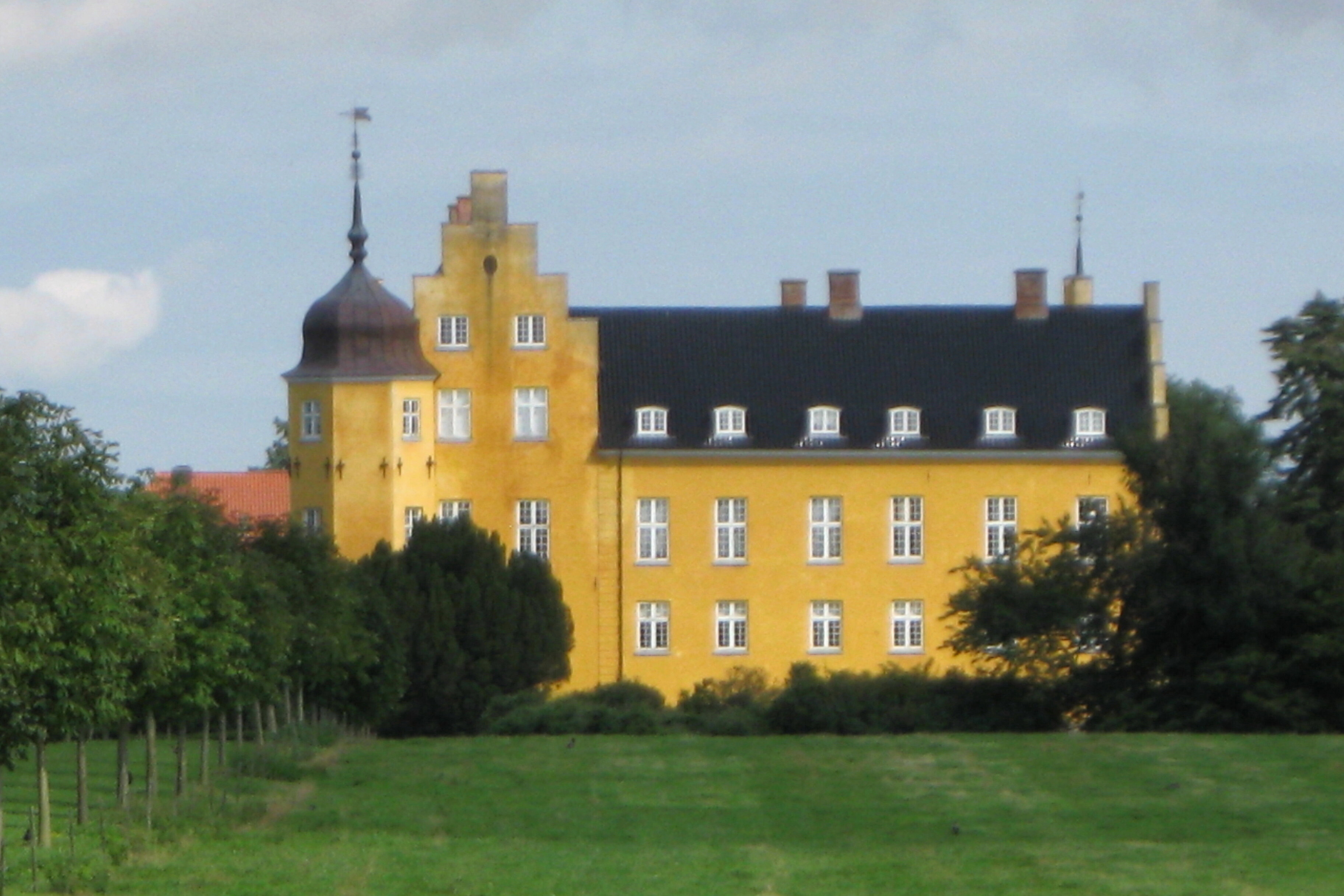
- Interactive map of the Krenkerup area

General information
- Location: Krenkerupvej 27, 4990 Sakskøbing, Denmark
- Coordinates: 54°46′37″N 11°40′13″E
- Completed: c. 1500-1631

Krenkerup is an old manor house located 3 km (2 mi) southwest of Sakskøbing on the Danish island of Lolland. It is one of Denmark's oldest estates and manors, documented as early as the 1330s. Between 1815 and 1938, it was known as Hardenberg.

== History ==
=== Gøye family ===
The first known owner of the estate was Axel Mogensen Gøye.

=== Brahe family, 1558–1622 ===
Margrethe Gøye brought the estate into her marriage to Peder Brahe.

=== Rosenkrantz family ===
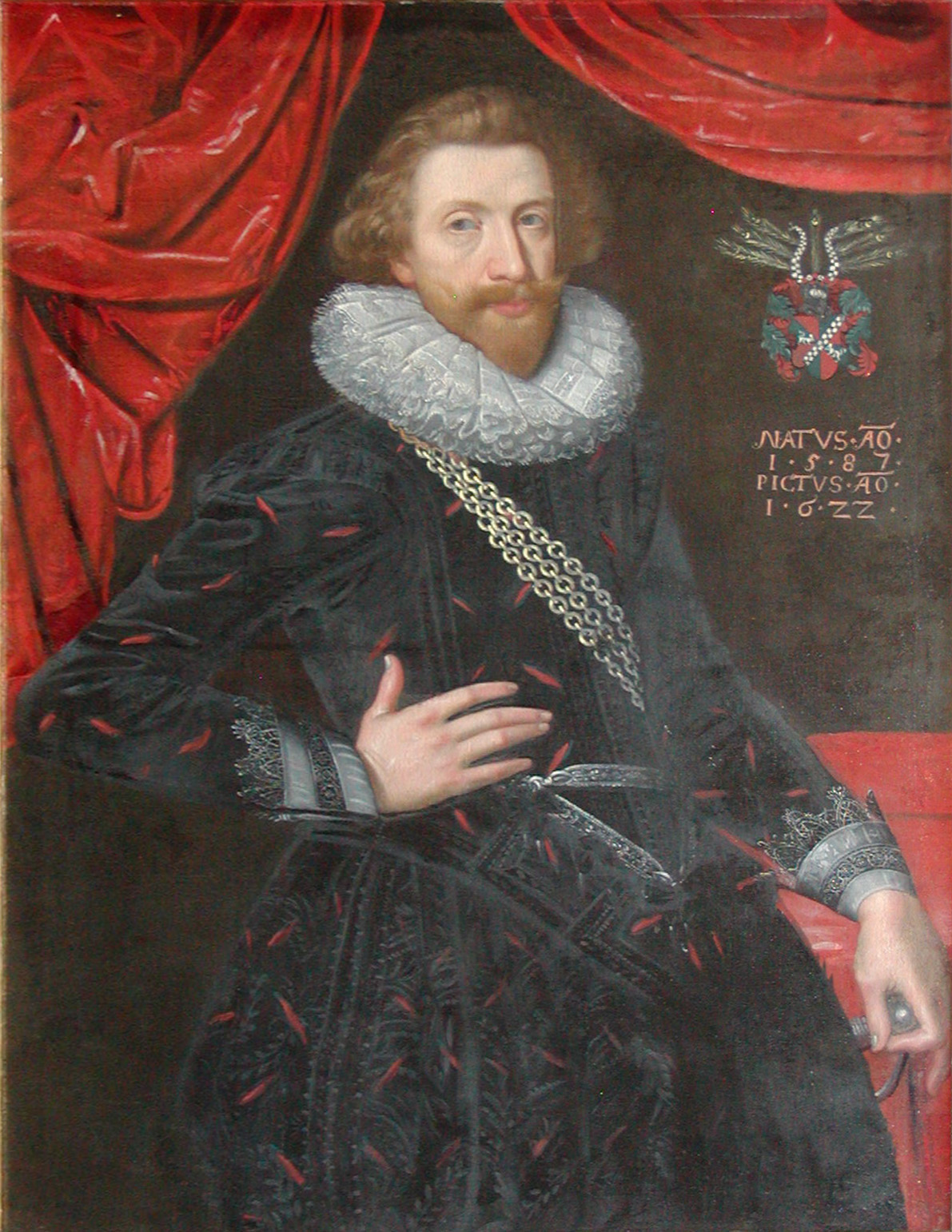
Palle Rosencrantz in 1622.

In 1622, Krenkerup was once again transferred to a new noble family, when Otte Pedersen Brahe's widow Elisabeth (née Rosensparre) married to Palle Rosenkrantz. His descendents owned the estate until 1677.

=== Reventlow family ===
In 1731, the Reventlows established a family property consisting of Krenkerup, Rosenlund and Nørregård which in 1815 became the countyship of Hardenberg-Reventlow, including the subsidiary estates of Nielstrup, Sæbyholm and Christiansdal.

=== Hardenberg-Reventlow family ===
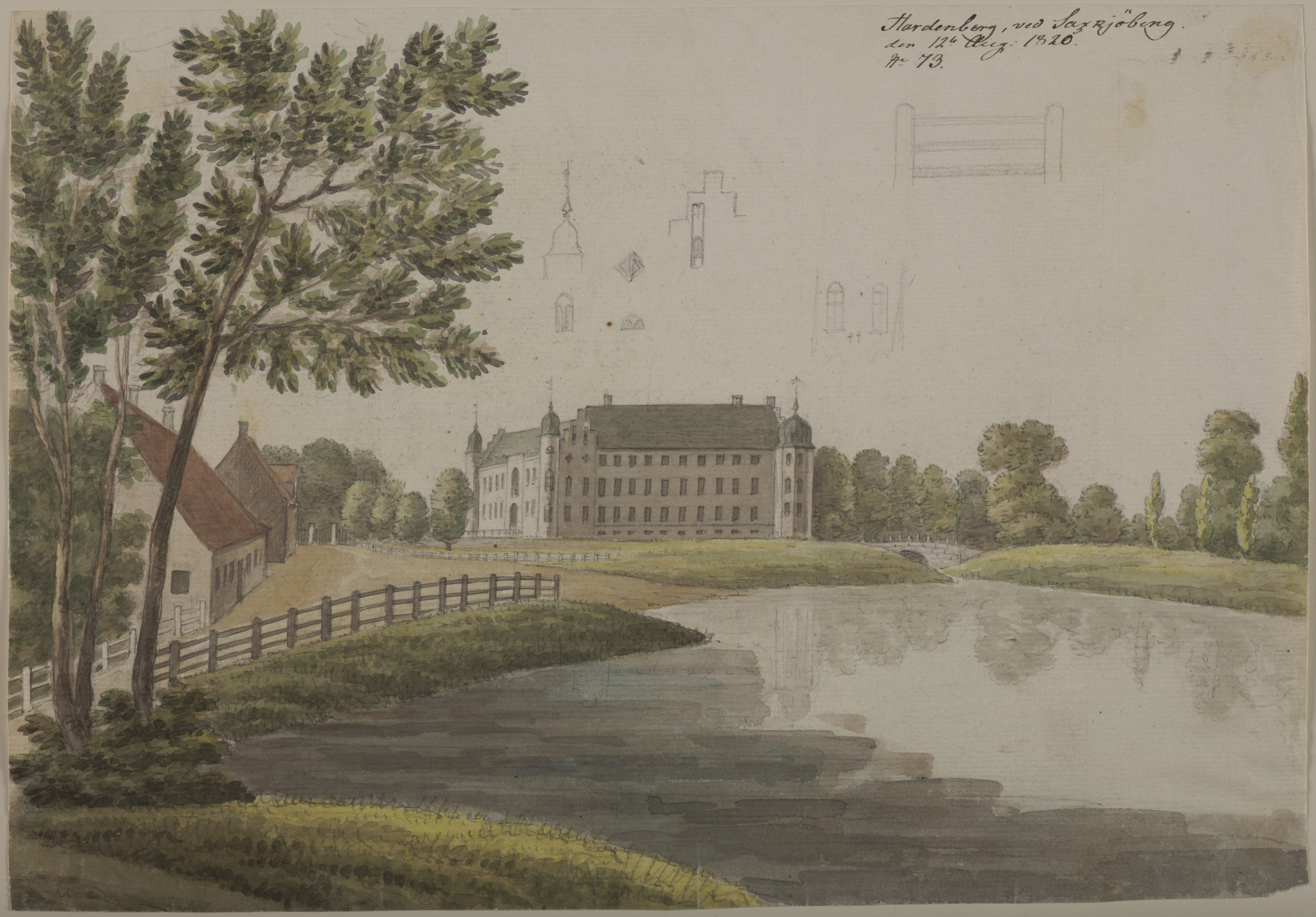
Gardenberg on a watercolour by created by Ole Jørgen Rawert on 2 August 1820.

In 1774 Juliane Frederikke Christiane Reventlow brought Krenkerup into her marriage to Carl August Hardenberg. Their son Christian Heinrich August Hardenberg-Reventlow became the owner of the estate in 1793. In 1815, he renamed the estate Hardenberg. It was dissolved in 1924. After his death in 1840 the estate was passed to his daughter Ida. Her son Carl adopted the name Holck-Hardenberg-Reventlow.

== Today ==
Covering an area of 3,700 ha (9,100 acres), the estate is one of the largest in Denmark. Today it is an active agricultural concern and also houses a brewery and the only professional full size polo field in Denmark.

== Architecture ==
The three-winged building stands on a narrow, rectangular mound surrounded by a moat. The original stone house from 1490 was extended by statesman Mogens Gøye with three new wings, forming an enclosed courtyard. A tower was added on the west side. In 1631, Palle Rosenkrantz built an extra storey on the north wing and an octagonal tower on the southeast corner. The south wing was destroyed by fire in 1689 and never rebuilt. The entire complex was renovated in 1780.

== List of owners ==
- (1367–1411) Axel Mogensen Gøye
- (?–1392) Laurids Nielsen Kabel
- (1381–1392) Mogens Gøye
- (1411–?) Karen Madsdatter (married name: Gøye)
- (1411–1417) Oluf Axelsen Gøye
- (1411–1450) Mogens Axelsen Gøye
- (1417–?) Mette Christiernsdatter, (married names: Gøye, Jensen)
- (?–?) Jens Jensen
- (1417–1427) Evert Moltke
- (1417–1427) Mathias Moltke
- (1450–1506) Eskil Gøye
- (1506–1544) Mogens Gøye
- (1544) Birgitte Gøye (married name: Trolle)
- (1544–1558) Albrecht Gøye
- (1558–1594) Margrethe Albrechtsdatter Gøye, (married name: Brahe)
- (1558–1566) Otte Gøye
- (1558–?) Margrethe Gøye, (married name: Brahe)
- (? –1610) Peder Brahe
- (1610–1613) Axel Brahe
- (1613–1622) Otte Pedersen Brahe
- (1613–1622) Elisabeth Rosensparre (married names: Brahe, Rosenkrantz)
- (1622–1642) Palle Rosenkrantz
- (1642–1649) Lisbeth Lunge (married name: Rosenkrantz)
- (1649–1660) Jørgen Rosenkrantz
- (1660–1665) Mette Rosenkrantz
- (1660–1677) Birgitte Rosenkrantz (married name: Skeel)
- (1660–1680) Johan Rantzau
- (1660–1680) Jørgen Rantzau
- (1660–1680) Palle Rantzau
- (1677–1695) Jørgen Skeel
- (1695–1700) Benedicte Margrethe Brockdorff (married names: Skeel, Reventlow)
- (1700–1738) Christian Detlev Reventlow
- (1718–1739) Benedicte Margrethe Brockdorff (married names: Skeel, Reventlow)
- (1739–1750) Conrad Ditlev Reventlow
- (1750–1759) Christian Ditlev Reventlow
- (1759–1774) Juliane Frederikke Christiane Reventlow (married name: Hardenberg)
- (1774–1788) Carl August Hardenberg
- (1788–1793) Juliane Frederikke Christiane Reventlow
- (1793–1840) Christian Heinrich August Hardenberg-Reventlow
- (1840–1867) Ida Augusta Hardenberg-Reventlow, (married names: Holck, Gersdorff, D'Almaforte)
- (1867–1885) Carl Ludvig August Rudolph Holck-Hardenberg-Reventlow
- (1885–1903) Princess Lucie of Schönaich-Carolath, (married name: Haugwitz)
- (1903–1921) Heinrich Bernhard Carl Paul Georg Curt Haugwitz-Hardenberg-Reventlow
- (1921–1970) Henrik Ludwig Erdmann Georg Haugwitz-Hardenberg-Reventlow
- (1970–2011) Rupert Gorm Reventlow-Grinling
- (2003–present) Patrick Reventlow-Grinling

== Literature ==
- Rhode, Peder Christian; Friis, J. J. F. (1859). Samlinger til de danske øers Laalands og Falster historie (in Danish). C. Steen. pp. 445–.
