= Christian Ditlev Frederik Reventlow =

Danish noble and politician (1748–1827)

Christian Ditlev Frederik, Count of Reventlow
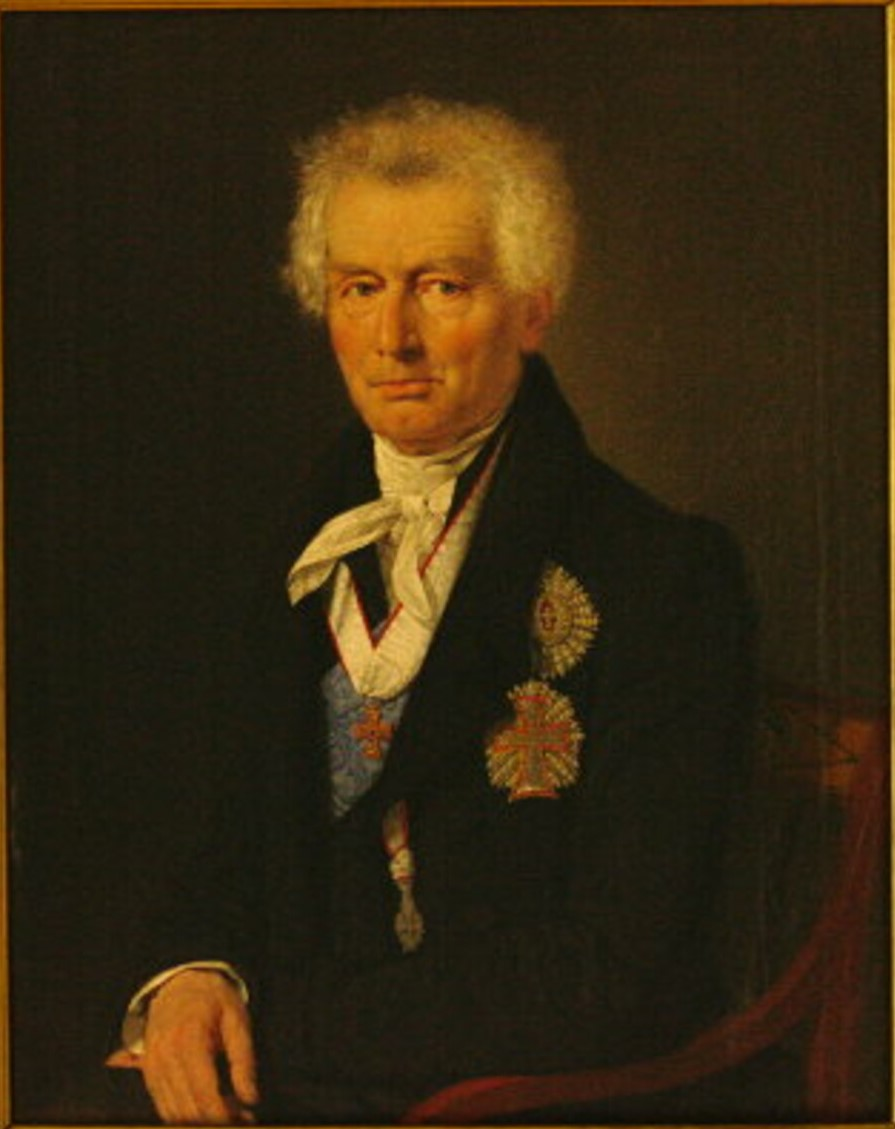
- Reventlow by Christian Albrecht Jensen
- Born: 11 March 1748; Christianssæde, Denmark
- Died: 11 October 1827 (aged 79)
- Resting place: Horslunde cemetery, Lolland
- Occupations: Politician, estate owner, civil servant, farmer
- Known for: Prime Minister; Reformer; Arts patronage
- Spouse: Frederikke Charlotte von Beulwitz
- Parents: Christian Ditlev Reventlow (1710–1775) (father); Baroness Johanne Sophie Frederikke von Bothmer (mother)
- Relatives: Count Johan Ludvig Reventlow, (his brother), Countess Louise Stolberg, (his sister)
- Awards: Order of the Elephant, Order of the Dannebrog

Christian Ditlev Frederik, Count of Reventlow (11 March 1748 – 11 October 1827) was a Danish statesman and reformer, the son of Privy Councillor Christian Ditlev Reventlow (1710–1775) by his first wife, baroness Johanne Sophie Frederikke von Bothmer. His influence on the life of the Danish people and, particularly, the conditions of the peasantry, made him very popular. He was the brother of Johan Ludvig Reventlow, who in the late 1700s served as his colleague; salonist Louise Stolberg, who was his intellectual partner and opponent through their extensive mail correspondence; and Commodore Conrad Georg Reventlow.

C. D. F. Reventlow was one of the politicians behind the dissolution of the stavnsbånd, which was a serfdom-like institution, bonding men between the ages of 18 and 36 to live on the estate where they were born. This dissolution is widely regarded as having been the work of Reventlow and his two good friends and colleagues Andreas Peter Bernstorff and Christian Colbjørnsen.

From 1789, Reventlow was a leading member of the school commission which prepared the Danish School Law of 1814, and he actively contributed to the establishment of teacher seminars. Within the field of forestry, Reventlow was the pioneer behind the Fredsskovforordning of 1805, which ensured that new trees was strategically planted as logging was carried out. On his own estates, he practiced his political ideas long before they were made laws – moreover, he founded schools and abolished the Danish version of corvée – hoveri. In 1797, he was appointed Minister of the State – statsminister.

Reventlow's criticism of king Frederik's foreign and economic politics, which later led to war with England and state bankruptcy, increased the distance between him and the king. In 1813, he left his political offices – after having been President of the Danish Exchequer for 29 years – as a protest against the Decree of the State Bankruptcy. He was formally a member of the Council of State, the konseil, but he did not participate in the council's meetings.

Reventlow retreated to his Lolland estates, where he, probably being his own architect, erected the main building of Pederstrup and lived a peaceful life, although still actively working with the development of his estates. When the old statesman died in 1827, he was greatly honoured for having fought for civil liberty and the rights of the common people, and for having commenced the agrarian reforms.

== Early life and education ==
Christian Ditlev Frederik was born into the Reventlow family, an ancient Danish-German family of high nobility. His paternal great-grandfather was in reality the first Danish Prime Minister, Conrad Reventlow (then officially titled Grand Chancellor), and his paternal grandfather was the renowned military leader and diplomat Christian Ditlev Reventlow.

The influence of Christian Ditlev Frederik Reventlow's family was in slow decline at the time of his birth. No more than around 30 years earlier, his grandfather Christian Ditlev was at the top of his career – being appointed General of the Infantry by king Frederick IV of Denmark – the highest title king Frederick ever gave anyone. A few years later, in 1721, his half-sister Anne Sophie – Christian Ditlev Frederik's great aunt – was crowned Queen of Denmark, having been king Frederick's mistress for almost a decade. There was even talk of the "Reventlow gang" as Anna Sophie and her relatives were called – a testament to the influence of the Reventlow and von Holstein families during the time.

When Frederik IV died and the legitimate son of his first marriage was crowned King Christian VI of Denmark, however, the golden days of the Reventlow gang were over. King Christian detested his fathers new queen and banished her from Copenhagen to Clausholm manor – her birthplace – where she spent the rest of her life, practically under house arrest.

C. D. F. Reventlow's father, also named Christian Ditlev (1710–1775) held symbolical political offices, but most likely never took any interest in life at court or in the lifestyle of 18th-century Danish aristocracy. A large part of his life was dedicated to the administration and welfare of his estates, and most of all the upbringing of his four children. His famous sons as well as his daughter later emphasised the importance of their ideally rural childhood – and of their father's full satisfaction in working for the benefit of the subjects of the estate. Christian Ditlev Reventlow was appointed Chamberlain in 1735 and Councillor of the State in 1745 and received two honorary awards, as he was made a hvid ridder and blå ridder – white and blue knight.

After having been educated at the academy of Sorø and at Leipzig, C. D. F. Reventlow, in company with his younger brother Johan Ludwig and the distinguished Saxon economist Carl Wendt (1731–1815), the best of cicerones on such a tour, travelled through Germany, Switzerland, France and England, to examine the social, economical and agricultural conditions of civilized Europe. A visit to Sweden and Norway to study mining and metallurgy completed the curriculum, and when Reventlow in the course of 1770 returned to Denmark he was an authority on all the economic questions of the day.

== Early career ==
When the grand tour of Reventlow and his brother Johan Ludvig had come to an end, and Reventlow started his career in the service of the state, there were probably very few other noblemen with the knowledge and education corresponding to that of Reventlow's; his advancement was fast due to his advantageous connections and to his noble birth. In the year of his wedding, 1774, he held a high position in the Board of Trade, Kommercekollegiet; two years later, he entered the department of mines, and in 1781 he was a member of the Overskattedirectionen, or chief taxing board.

== Career after the Guldberg era ==
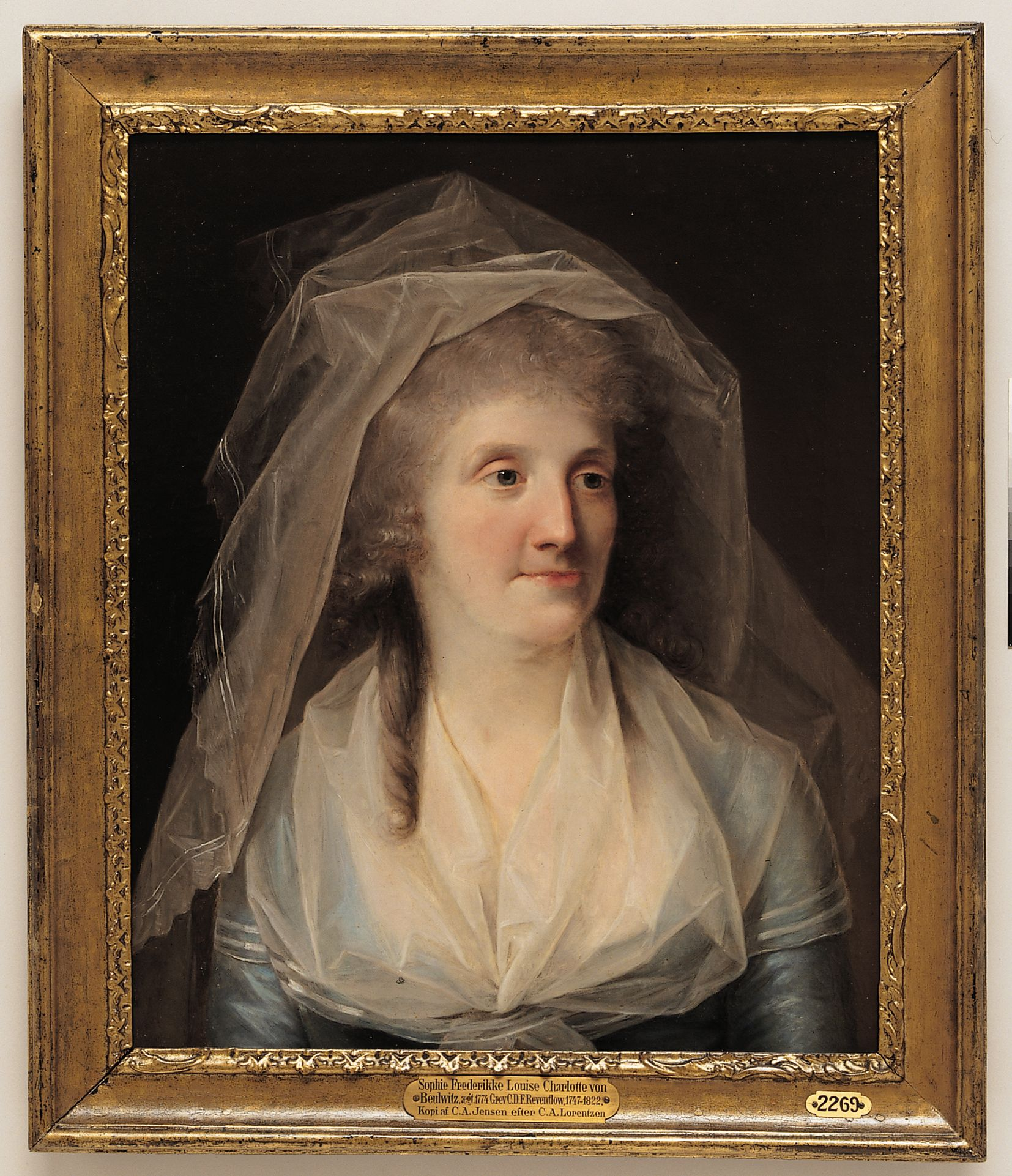
Sophie Frederikke Louise Charlotte von Beulwitz.

In 1774 he married Frederica Charlotte von Beulwitz, with whom he had thirteen children. On his father's death in 1775 inherited the family estate in Laaland. Reventlow overflowed with progressive ideas, especially as regards agriculture, and he devoted himself, heart and soul, to the improvement of his property and the amelioration of his serfs. Fortunately, the ambition to play a useful part in a wider field of activity than he could find in the country ultimately prevailed. His time came when the ultra-conservative ministry of Ove Høegh-Guldberg was dismissed (14 April 1784) and Andreas Peter Bernstorff, the statesman for whom Reventlow had the highest admiration, returned to power.

Reventlow was considered knowledgeable and confident in his fields, and a pious man of strong and warm feelings.

The condition of the peasantry especially interested him. He was convinced that free labor would be far more profitable to the land, and that the peasant himself would be better if released from subjugation.

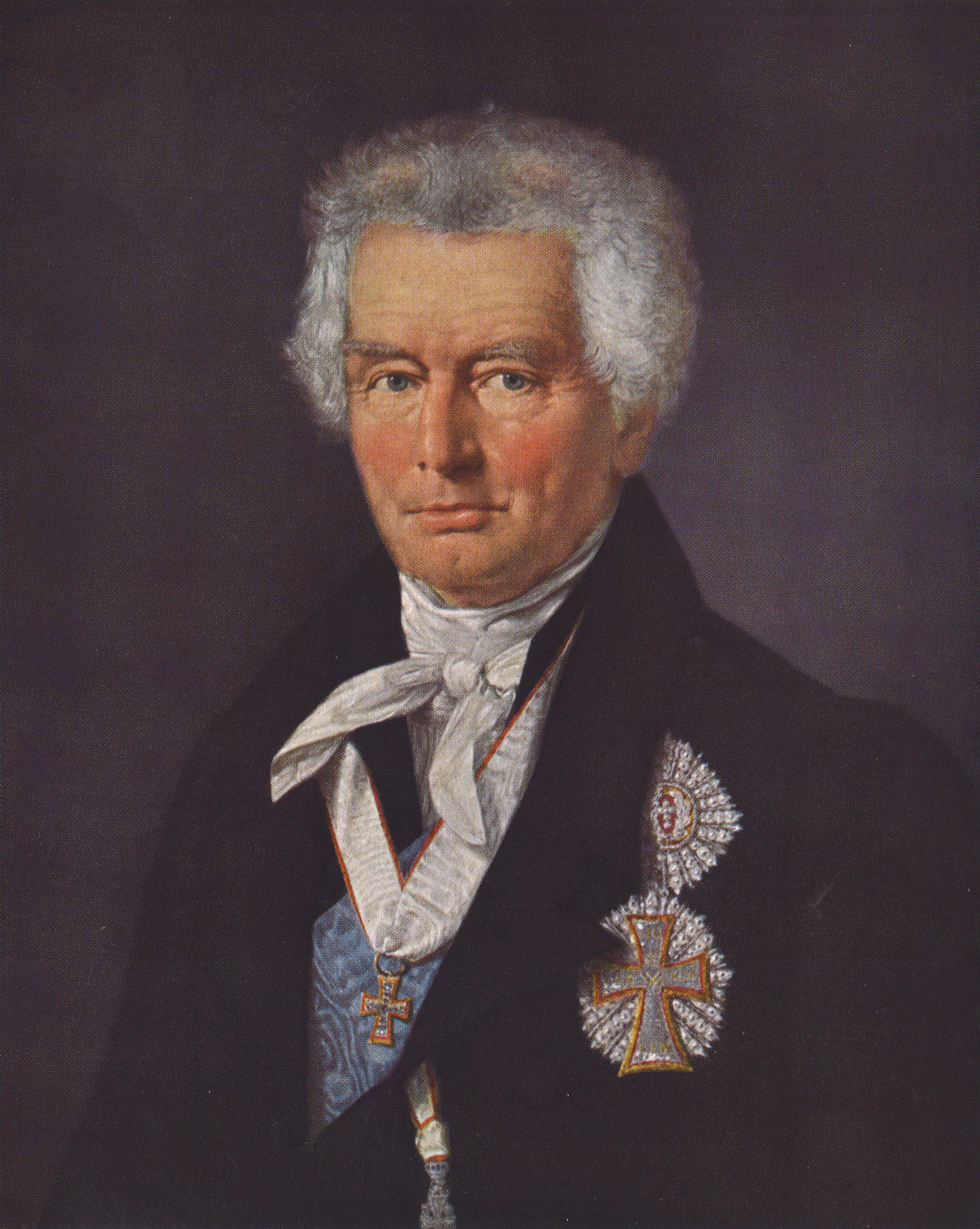
C. D. F. Reventlow during his retirement in 1813

His favorite field of labor was thrown open to him when, on 6 August 1784, he was appointed head of the Rentekammeret, or Exchequer. His first step was to appoint a small commission to improve the condition of the crown serfs, and among other things enable them to turn their leaseholds into freeholds. Noting that Frederick VI was sympathetic towards the improvement of conditions for the peasantry, Reventlow persuaded him, in July 1786, to appoint a commission to examine the condition of all the peasantry in the kingdom. This celebrated agricultural commission continued its work for many years, and introduced a series of major reforms. For example, an ordinance of 8 June 1787 modified the existing leaseholds greatly to the benefit of the peasantry; another on 20 June 1788 abolished villenage and completely transformed the much-abused hoveri system whereby the feudal tenant was required to cultivate his lord's land as well as his own; and an ordinance of 6 December 1799 abolished the hoveri system altogether. Reventlow was also instrumental in founding the public credit banks, which enabled small cultivators to borrow money on favorable terms. In conjunction with his friend, Heinrich Ernst Schimmelmann (1747–1831), he was also instrumental in the passing of ordinances permitting free trade between Denmark and Norway, the abolition of import duty for corn, and the abolition of the mischievous monopoly of the Iceland trade.

But the financial distress of Denmark, the jealousy of the duchies, the ruinous political complications of the Napoleonic period, and, above all, the Crown Prince Frederick's growing jealousy of his official advisers, which led him to rule, or rather misrule, for years without the co-operation of his Council of State—all these calamities were at last too much even for Reventlow. On 7 December 1813 he was dismissed and retired to his estates, where, after working cheerfully among his peasantry to the last, he died in 1827.

== Family ==
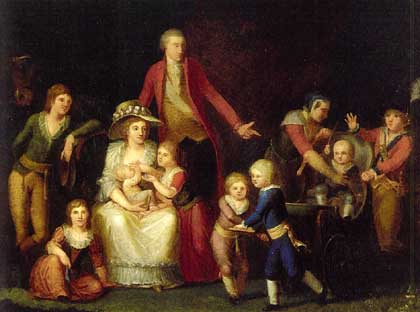
Reventlow with his wife and children.

In the early summer of 1774, Reventlow married Frederikke Charlotte von Beulwitz (1747–1822), in Tirsted Church, a daughter of Privy Councillor Christoph Ernst von Beulwitz (1695–1757) and Sophie Hedevig von Warnstedt (1707–1768).

Eight children survived childhood; among them were the following:

- Christian Detlev Reventlow (1775–1851), farmer and politician, married Margrethe Benedicte von Qualen and had issue,
- Ludvig Detlev Reventlow (1780–1857), officer, married Agnes von Hammerstein-Loxten and had issue; he was the grandfather of the "Bohemian countess of Schwabing", writer Fanny zu Reventlow, and of the German officer Ernst Graf zu Reventlow.
- Conrad Detlev Cay Reventlow (1785–1840), farmer, married Hanne Caroline Rosenkilde and had issue,
- Einar Carl Ditlev Reventlow (1788–1867), jurist and farmer. Lived for some time at Vindeby, the estate of his aunt Louise Stolberg and her husband Christian zu Stolberg-Stolberg and was educated in agriculture there. He married his niece, the eldest daughter of Christian Detlev (1775–1851) and moved to Sweden, where he was made a Swedish count. He is the ancestor of a family line in Sweden and one in Germany, where the head of the Swedish comital line is now based.
- Frederik Detlef Reventlow 1791–1851, a Diplomat and Privy Councillor, Danish envoy to the British court. Married Birgitte Friederiche Christensen and had issue.

The descendants of C. D. F. Reventlow are notable for being among the Danish families of high nobility who, already in the beginning of the 19th century, intermarried with members of non-noble families.
