= Kommercekollegiet =

Government agency of Denmark

Kommercekollegiet (The Board of Trade or The Trade Authority), also Kommercekollegium, was a central executive agency for commercial, marine and industrial affairs under the absolute monarchy of Denmark. It functioned with variations in scope and under different designations on and off during the period of 1668 to 1816. After the dissolution of an initial agency at the end of the 1680s, its re-establishment in 1704 was specifically to advise the Danish monarch on trade and industrial matters.

== History ==
Kommercekollegiet was first set up in 1668 in accordance with the wishes of Copenhagen's leading merchants. With the development of international trade, it was intended to help Denmark compete with the Dutch Republic but was dissolved at the end of the 1680s, failing to achieve any progress. In 1704, a new Kommercekollegium was established, known from 1708 as Politi- og Kommercekollegiet (Police and Trade Authority), which also oversaw the commercial interests of Copenhagen. From 1724, the authority came under Copenhagen's Magistracy, only to be dissolved in 1731. Four years later, General-Landets Økonomi- og Kommercekollegium (Authority General for Rural Economy and Trade) was established, functioning until 1768. After matters of trade had been rather dispersed for a number of years, in 1773 Generallandøkonomi- og Kommercekollegiet (The Authority General for Rural Economy and Trade) was formed, gaining considerable importance as widespread international trade began to flourish. In 1816, it was merged with Generaltoldkammeret (General Chamber of Customs and Excise) and in 1848, its resources were shared between the Ministry of the Interior and the Foreign Ministry.

Although there were interruptions and changes, the organization existed from 1668 to 1848. Kommercekollegiet was part of the collegial administration under the absolute monarchy. It was at different times combined with other branches of the central administration, such as police, customs, and rural administration. At least from 1735, Kommercekollegiet had its own subsidiaries through which matters of trade, factory and industrial operations were treated before they were submitted for its rulings. Kommercekollegium became the joint designation for General-Landets-Økonomi- og Kommercekollegiet (1735–68), General-Kommercekollegiet (1768–71), Kommercedeputationen (1771–73), and Generallandøkonomi- og Kommercekollegiet (1773-1816).

== Notable members ==
Influential members of Kommercekollegiet have included:

- Iver Rosenkrantz (1674–1745)
- Johan Frederik Classen (1725–1792)
- Heinrich Carl von Schimmelmann (1724–1782)
- Christian Ditlev Reventlow (1710–1775)
- Carsten Anker (1747–1824)
- Christian Ditlev Frederik Reventlow (1748–1847).
