= Christianssæde =

Danish historic manor house

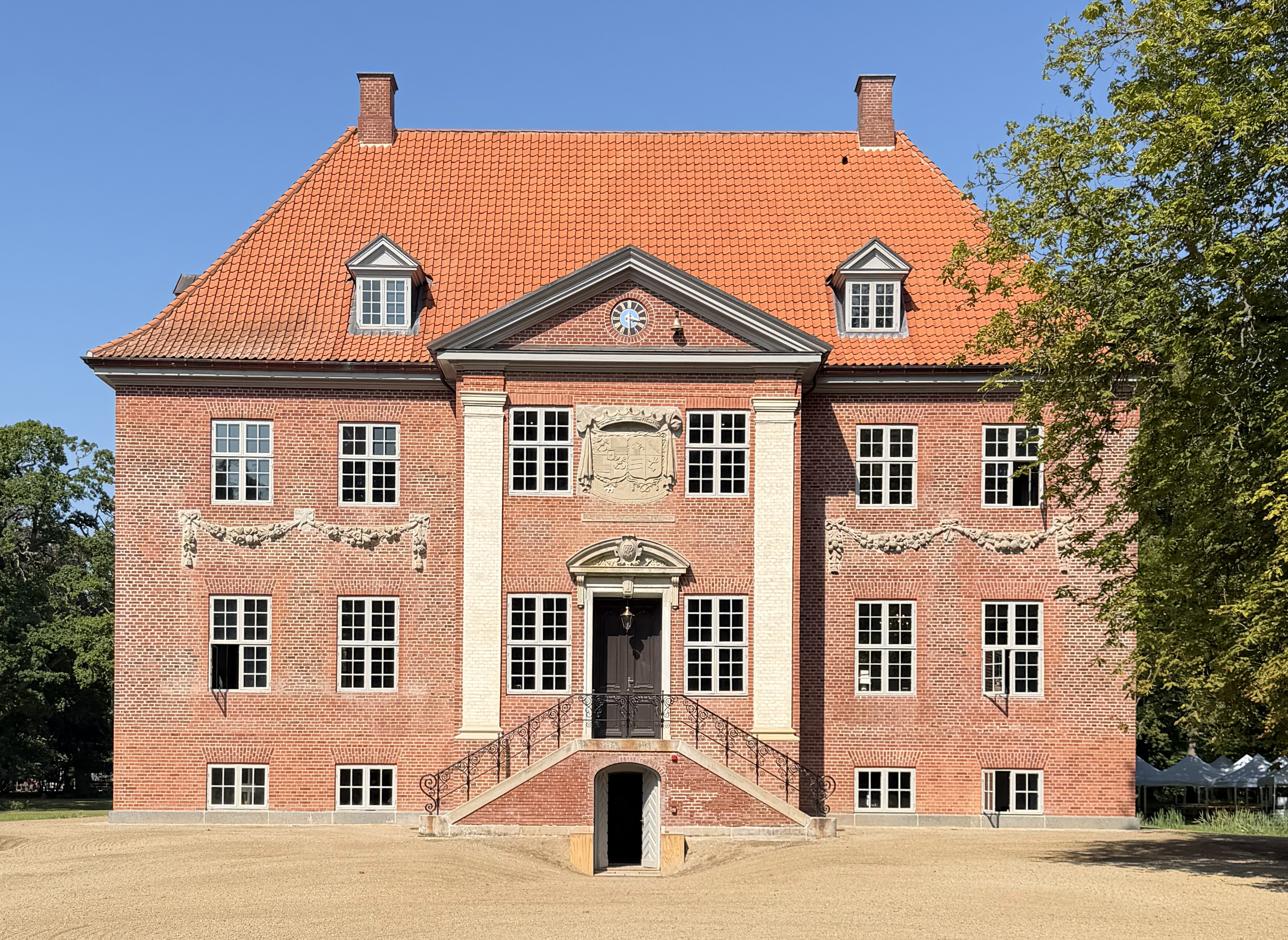
- Interactive map of the Christianssæde area
- Former names: Taastrup and Christiansborg

General information
- Architectural style: Baroque
- Location: Kristianssædevej 3, 4930 Maribo, Denmark
- Coordinates: 54°45′24″N 11°21′19″E
- Completed: 1690
- Owner: Andreas Just Karberg, Albert Rygg Karberg, Alice Rygg Karberg
- Landlord: Andreas Just Karberg

Design and construction
- Architect: Possibly Ewert Janssen

Christianssæde is a manor house and estate located close to Maribo on the island of Lolland in southeastern Denmark.

== History ==
=== Early history ===
Taastrup was in 1397 owned by Henning Lydersen Kabel. After his death, in about 1440, it was passed to his son-in-law Peder Nielsen. The next owner was his daughter Anne Nielsen, who was married to Tyge Lunge of Basnæs. Taastrup then passed between different families.

In the 17th century, it was inherited by Jørgen Grubbe. He was lensmann of Halsted Kloster. His son Christian Grubbe inherited the estate in 1640.

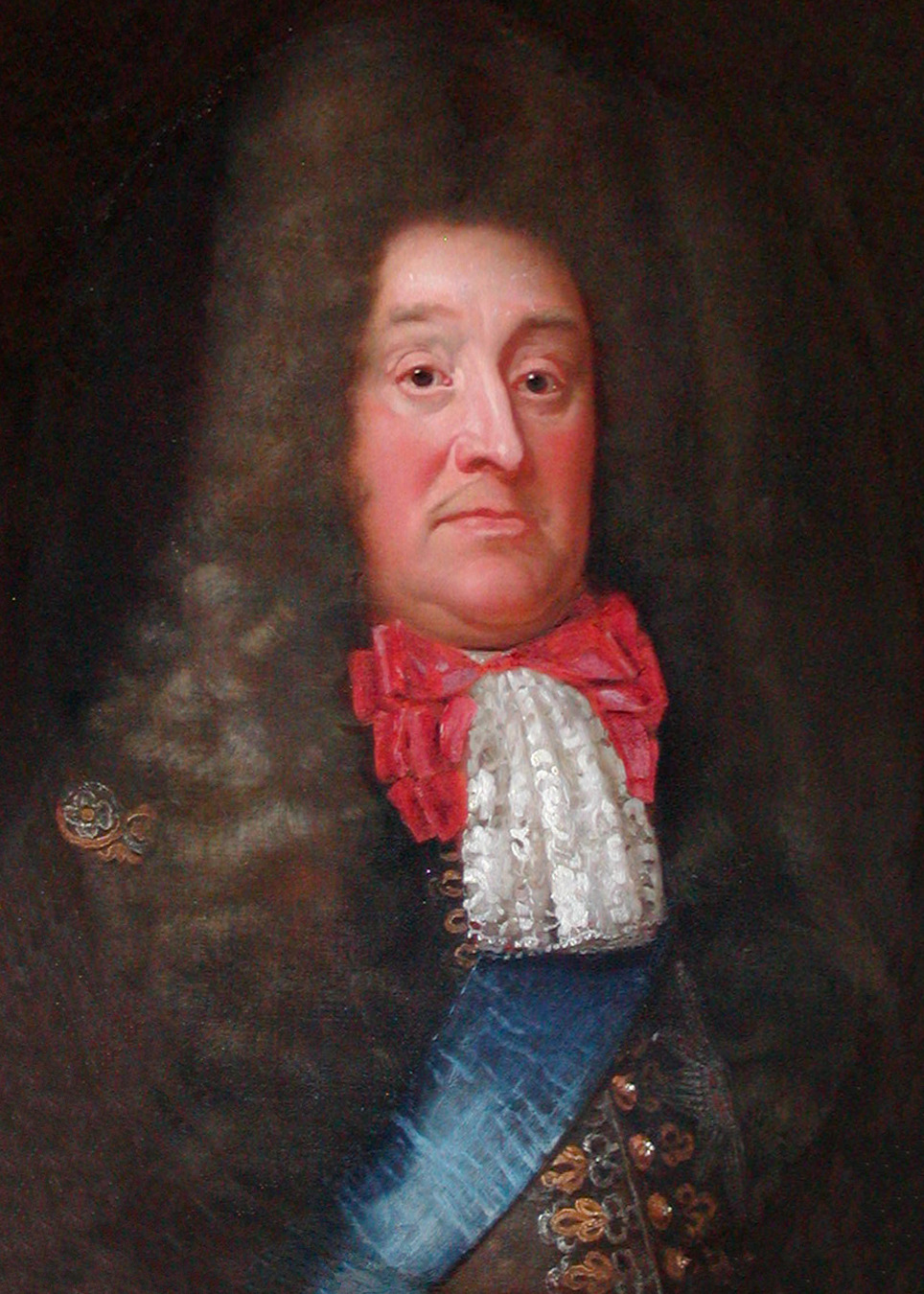
Jens Juel for whom the current main building was constructed in 1690

Christian Grubbe's heirs sold Taastrup and neighboring Aalstrup to Joachim Gersdorff in 1653. He was appointed as rigshofmester in 1649. He acquired a number of estates in Scania through his marriage to Øllegaard Huitfeldt. Gersdorff died in 1661 and his widow was later convicted of his murder and executed.

In 1669, Gersdorff's two sons-in-law, Jørgen Bielke and Jens Rodsteen, sold Taastrup to Poul von Klingenberg. He had to sell the estate in 1686 to one of his creditors, Regitze Sophie Vind, who was married to baron Jens Juel of Juellinge. Jens Juel constructed a new main building on the estate.

Regitze Sophie Vind's son, baron Vilhelm Frederik Gyldenkrone, took over the estate in 1702. His widow Anne Vind Banner kept the estate after his death in 1708. Her new husband, Hans Rantzau, sold Taastrup and Aalstrup in 1728.

=== Reventlow family, 1728–1924 ===
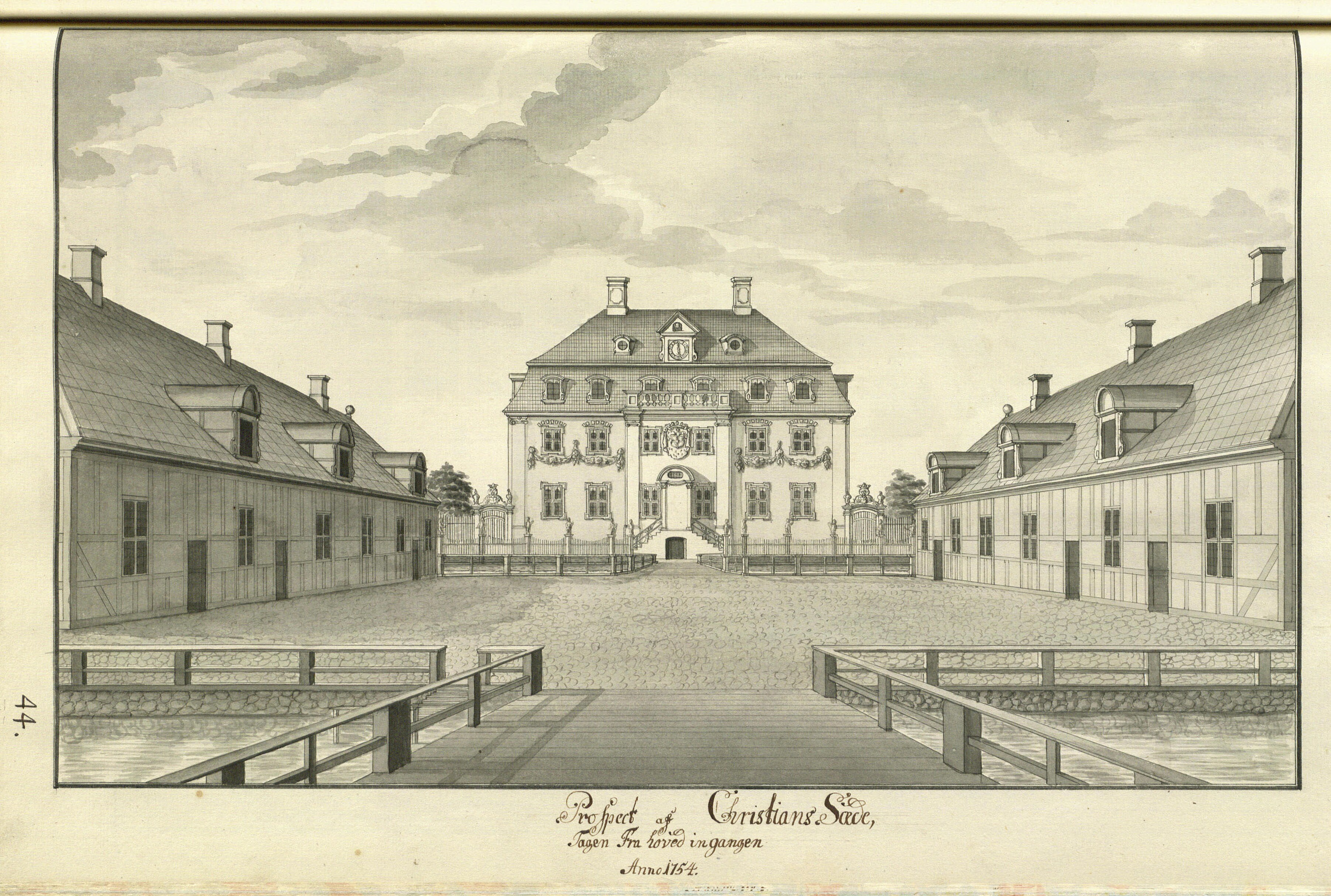
Christianssæde 1754

The new owner was count Christian Detlev Reventlow. He had acquired the estates Krenkerup, Rosenlund and Nørregård on Lolland through his marriage to Benedicte Margrethe Brockdorff in 1700 and had a few years earlier also purchased Pederstrup and Skeltofte. In 1723, he also purchased Lungholm. His other holdings included the countship of Reventlow in Southern Jutland and the barony of Brahetrolleborg on Funen from 1722. In 1729, he was able to establish the countship of Christiansborg. Its name was changed to Christianssæde when Copenhagen Castle was renamed Christiansborg in 1741,

Christian Ditlev Reventlow, Christian Ditlev Reventlow's youngest son, became the second holder of the countship of Christianssæde when his father died in 1738. He also received the remaining holdings on Lolland, the countship of Reventlow and the barony of Brahetrolleborg when his elder brother died without male heirs in 1759,

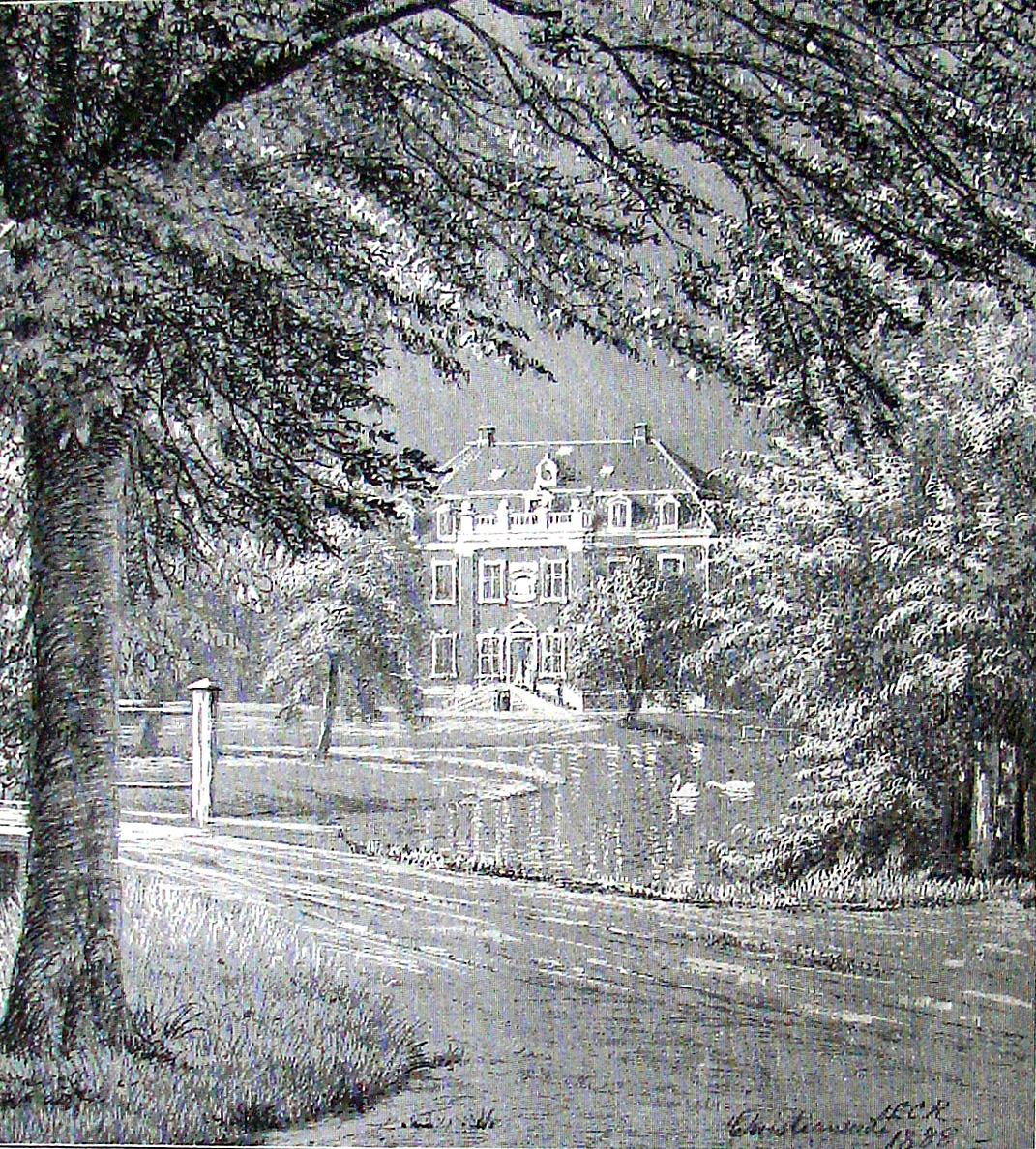
Christianssæde in 1888

Christian Ditlev Reventlow died in 1775 and was succeeded by his eldest son, Christian Ditlev Frederik Reventlow, who later served as prime minister. The countship of Reventlow was passed to his second oldest son, Conrad Reventlow, while the barony of Brahetrolleborg passed to his youngest son Johan Ludvig Reventlow. The countships of Christianssæde and Reventlow were once again unified when Conrad Reventlow died without male heirs in 1815. Christian Ditlev Frederik Reventlow introduced many of the agricultural reforms that later spread to the rest of the country.

Christian Ditlev Frederik Reventlow lived on the Pederstrup estate but died at Christianssæde in 1827. His successor was Christian Ditlev Reventlow. He continued his father's reforms. His son, Ferdinand Carl Otto Reventlow died in 1875. His widow, Benedicte Reventlow, resided at Christianssæde. She renovated the main building and redesigned the park. Her son, Christian Einar Ferdinand Ludvig Eduard Reventlow, used Brahetrolleborg as his primary residence and only used Christianssæde for shorter visits.

=== 1924–present: Later history ===
The countship was dissolved in 1924 as a result of the lensafløsningsloven of 1919. Christian Einar Ferdinand Ludvig Eduard Reventlow died in 1929. His only son had died the previous year. His remaining heirs, his widow and three daughters, sold Christianssæde in 1934.

The new owner was Peter Christian Ege Olsen. In 1935, he sold off much of the land. The main building and park was separated from the remaining land in 1938. The home farm and associated land was still owned by Peter Christian Ege Olsen's descendants in 2013. The main building changed hands several times before it was acquired by Lolland-Falsters Plejehjemsforening and converted into an orphanage for boys in 1952.

== List of owners ==
- (1390-1397) Peder Lauridsen
- (1397-1430) Henning Kabel
- (1430- ) Abel Henningsdatter Kabel, gift Lauridsen
- (1439-1443) Niels Lauridsen Kabel
- ( -1455) Peder Nielsen Kabel
- ( -1449) Anne Nielsdatter Kabel, gift Lunge
- (1449-1460) Tyge Lunge
- (1460-1480) Anne Nielsdatter Kabel, gift Lunge
- (1460-1461) Maren Tygesdatter Lunge, gift Brahe
- (1461-1487) Axel Brahe
- (1487-1520) Maren Tygesdatter Lunge, gift Brahe
- (1487-1525) Aage Axelsen Brahe
- (1525-1568) Johanne Henriksdatter Sparre
- (1545-1602) Beate Aagesdatter Brahe, gift Lykke
- (1545-1587) Jørgen Lykke
- (1587-1602) Beate Aagesdatter Brahe, gift Lykke
- (1602-1630) Kirsten Jørgensdatter Lykke, gift Grubbe
- (1630-1640) Jørgen Grubbe
- (1640-1653) Christian Grubbe
- (1653-1661) Joachim Gersdorff
- (1661-1669) Jørgen Bielke og Jens Rodsteen
- (1669-1686) Poul von Klingenberg
- (1686-1700) Jens Juel
- (1700-1702) Regitze Sophie Vind, gift Juel
- (1702-1708) Vilhelm Gyldencrone
- (1708-1710) Anne Vind Banner, gift 1) Gyldencrone, 2) Rantzau
- (1708-1728) Hans Rantzau
- (1728-1738) Christian Detlev Reventlow
- (1738-1775) Christian Ditlev Reventlow
- (1775-1827) Christian Ditlev Frederik Reventlow
- (1827-1851) Christian Ditlev Reventlow
- (1851-1875) Ferdinand Carl Otto Reventlow
- (1875-1929) Christian Einar Ferdinand Ludvig Eduard Reventlow
- (1929-1934) Lucie Marie Haugwitz-Hardenberg-Reventlow, gift 1) Reventlow, * 2) Walker
- (1934-1938) Peter Christian Ege Olsen
- (1938-1947) Frederik F. Wessel og hustru (hovedbygning)
- (1947-1951) H. Simonsgaard (hovedbygning)
- (1951-1985) Lolland-Falsters Plejehjemsforening (hovedbygning)
- (1985-1998) Elisabeth Kruse og Peer Poulsen (hovedbygning)
- (1998-2008) Stig Husted-Andersen (hovedbygning)
- (2008-2019) Boet efter Stig Husted-Andersen (hovedbygning)
- (2019- ) Andreas Just Karberg (hovedbygningen og Kristianssæde Skov)
