= Calcinato =

Calcinato Calsinàt
- Comune
- Comune di Calcinato
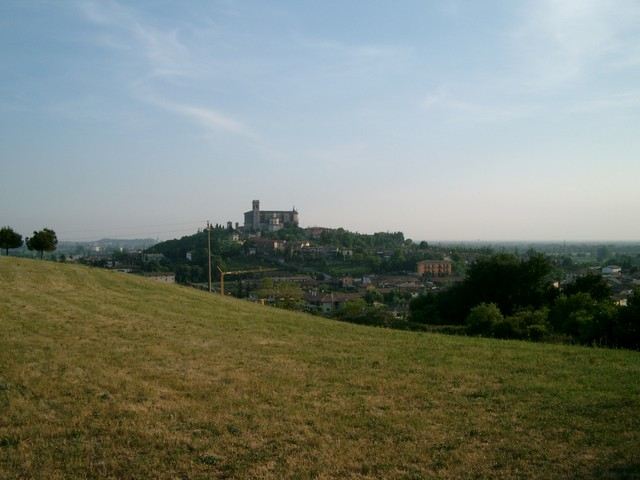

- Coat of arms

- Location within Italy Location within Lombardy
- Coordinates: 45°27′N 10°25′E
- Country: Italy
- Region: Lombardy
- Province: Province of Brescia (BS)
- Frazioni: Calcinatello, Ponte S. Marco

Government
  - Mayor: Nicoletta Maestri

Area
  - Total: 33.3 km^{2} (12.9 sq mi)
- Elevation: 171 m (561 ft)

Population (30 September 2019)
  - Total: 13,054
  - Density: 392/km^{2} (1,020/sq mi)
- Demonym: Calcinatesi
- Time zone: UTC+1 (CET)
  - Summer (DST): UTC+2 (CEST)
- Postal code: 25011
- Dialing code: 030
- Patron saint: Saint Vincent
- Saint day: 22 January
- Website: Official website

Calcinato (Brescian: Calsinàt) is a comune in the province of Brescia, in Lombardy. It is bounded by other communes of Mazzano, Lonato and Bedizzole.

== Twin towns ==
Calcinato is twinned with:

- Champtoceaux, France

== Transport ==
- Ponte San Marco-Calcinato railway station
