= Christian Ditlev Reventlow (1710–1775) =

Danish Privy Councillor, nobleman and landowner

Christian Ditlev, Count of Reventlow
- Count of Reventlow
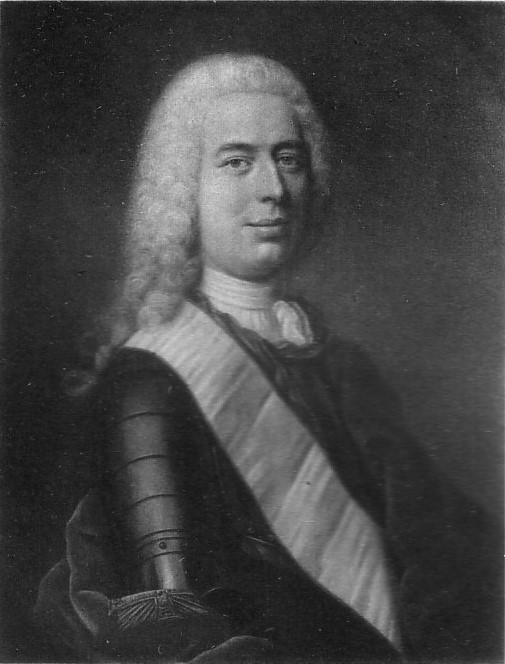
- 18th-century portrait
- Born: 10 March 1710; Copenhagen, Denmark
- Died: 30 March 1775 (aged 65); Copenhagen, Denmark
- Buried: Horslunde church
- Noble family: Reventlow
- Spouses: Baroness Johanne Sophie Frederikke von Bothmer; Countess Charlotte Amalie von Holstein
- Issue: Christian Ditlev Frederik Reventlow, Louise Stolberg
- Father: Christian Ditlev Reventlow
- Mother: Benedicte Margrethe von Brockdorff

Christian Ditlev, Count of Reventlow (10 March 1710 – 30 March 1775) was a Danish Privy Councillor, nobleman and a landowner.

== Early life and ancestry ==
Being a member of an old House of Reventlow, he was born into the family of significant influence and wealth. He was the third son of Count Christian Ditlev Reventlow and his wife, Benedicte Margrethe von Brockdorff. His father, an officer and diplomat, had close familial ties to the Danish royal family and had been betrothed to Anna Christiane Gyldenløve, illegitimate daughter of King Christian V of Denmark, who died young. Furthermore, his paternal aunt was Anne Sophie Reventlow, morganatic wife of King Frederik IV of Denmark, and later Queen of Denmark. Despite his position, Reventlow devoted his life to his family and the maintenance of his estates, showing very little interest in life at court.

== Personal life ==
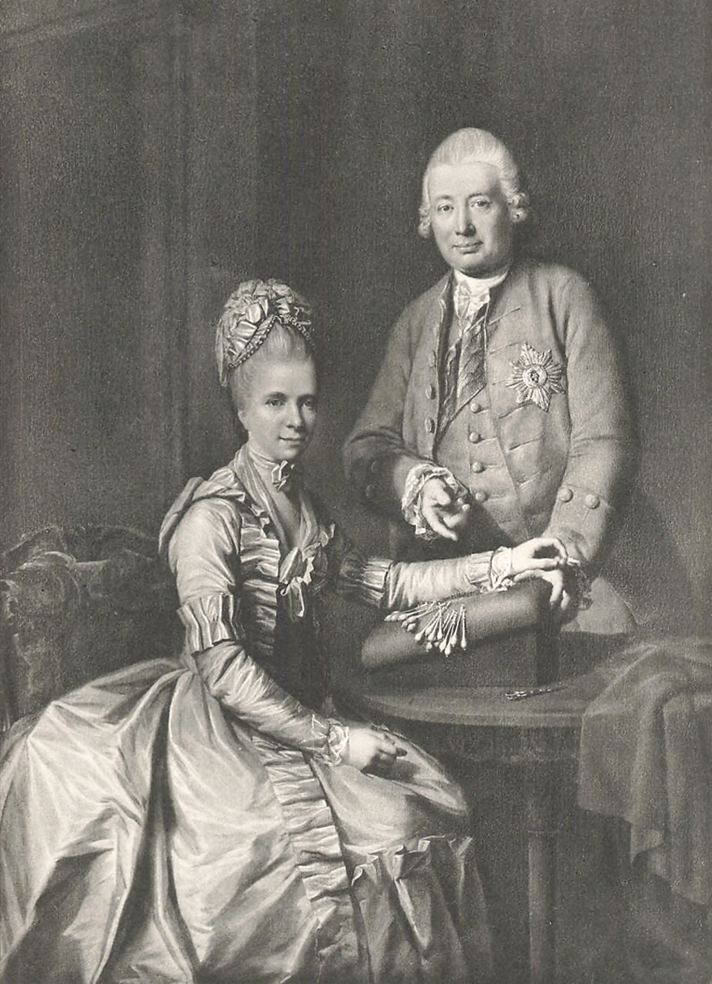
Reventlow second and his wife

He married in 1737 Baroness Johanne Sophie Frederikke von Bothmer, a daughter of Baron Friedrich Johann von Bothmer, elder brother of Count Hans Caspar von Bothmer. Though he had little-to-no political influence, he fathered three of the most prominent members of the Reventlow family: Prime Minister Christian Ditlev Frederik Reventlow; Johan Ludvig Reventlow; and, saloniste Louise Stolberg.

He is buried in Gorslunde Church.
