= Christian Detlev Reventlow =

Royal Dano-Norwegian Army officer and diplomat

Christian Ditlev
- Count of Reventlow
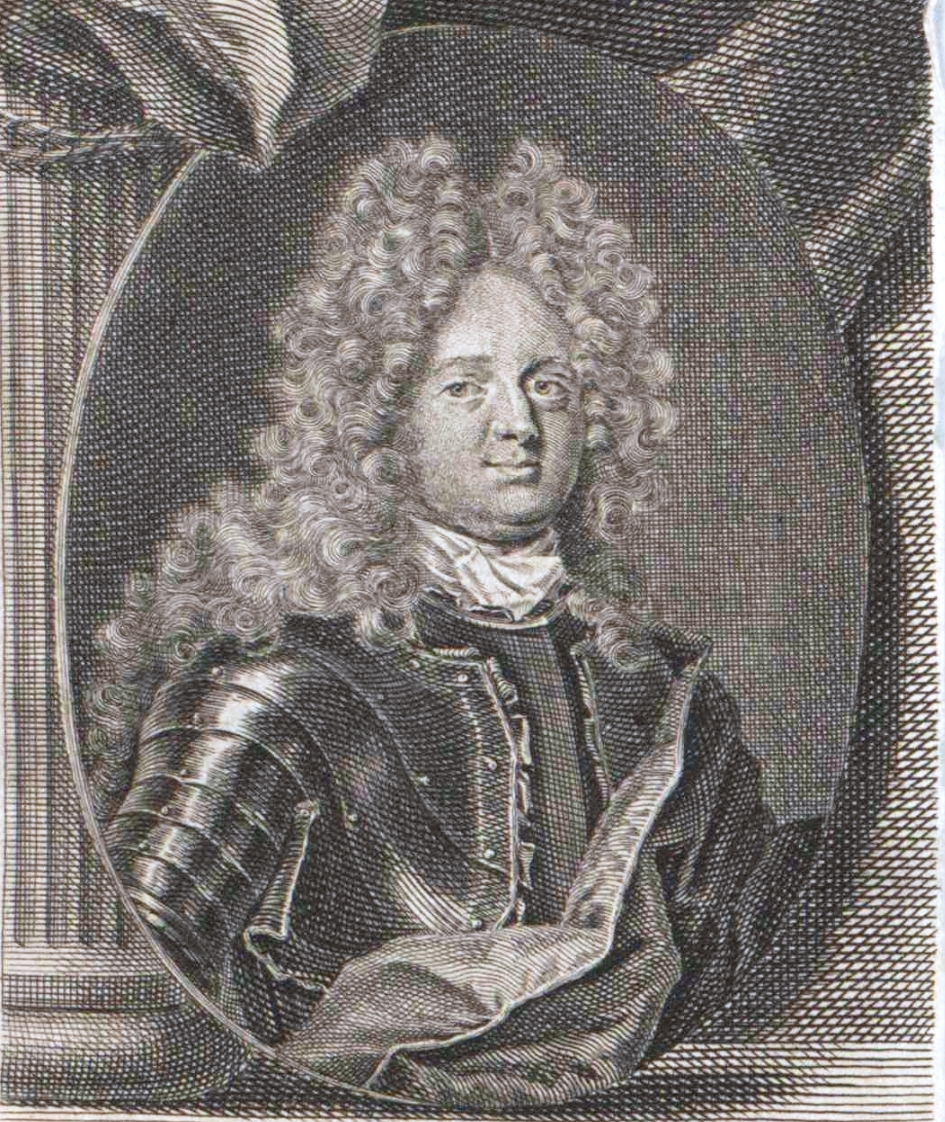
- Born: 21 June 1671; Haderslev, Denmark
- Died: 1 October 1738 (aged 67); Tølløse Castle, Denmark
- Buried: Radsted Church, Denmark
- Noble family: Reventlow
- Spouses: Anna Christiane Gyldenløve (m. 1686–1689); Benedikta Margarethe von Brockdorff (m. 1700–1738)
- Issue: Christian Ditlev Reventlow; Christine Armgard, Duchess of Schleswig-Holstein-Sonderburg-Plön
- Father: Conrad von Reventlow
- Mother: Anne Margrethe Gabel
- Military career
- Branch: Royal Danish Army
- Rank: General (DK); General of the Artillery (AUS)
- Conflicts: Nine Years' War; Williamite War in Ireland; Battle of Steenkerque; War of the Spanish Succession; Battle of Höchstädt; Battle of Cassano (WIA); Battle of Calcinato; Great Northern War

Christian Detlev, Count von Reventlow (21 June 1671 – 1 October 1738) was a Royal Dano-Norwegian Army officer and diplomat.

== Early life and education ==
Reventlow was the son of Conrad, Count Reventlow, chancellor of Denmark, and his first wife, Anna Margarethe Gabel (1651–1678). He was a brother of Christine Sophie Holstein (1672–1757) and a half-brother of Anne Sophie Reventlow (1693–1743), second wife and queen consort of King Frederick IV of Denmark.

== Career ==
Reventlow had a military career and fought in the Danish contingent against the French during the War of the Grand Alliance. In 1701 he was sent at the head of the Danish troops to fight the French in Italy during the War of Spanish Succession, serving under Prince Eugene of Savoy (1663–1736). He took part in the Battle of Höchstädt in 1704 and was severely wounded in the Battle of Cassano in 1705. At the Battle of Calcinato on 19 April 1706, Count von Reventlow was pitted against General Louis Joseph de Bourbon, duc de Vendôme (1654–1712), in a battle resulting in a French victory. His forces were divided as Reventlow was in command of the imperial army at both Montichiari and Calcinato.

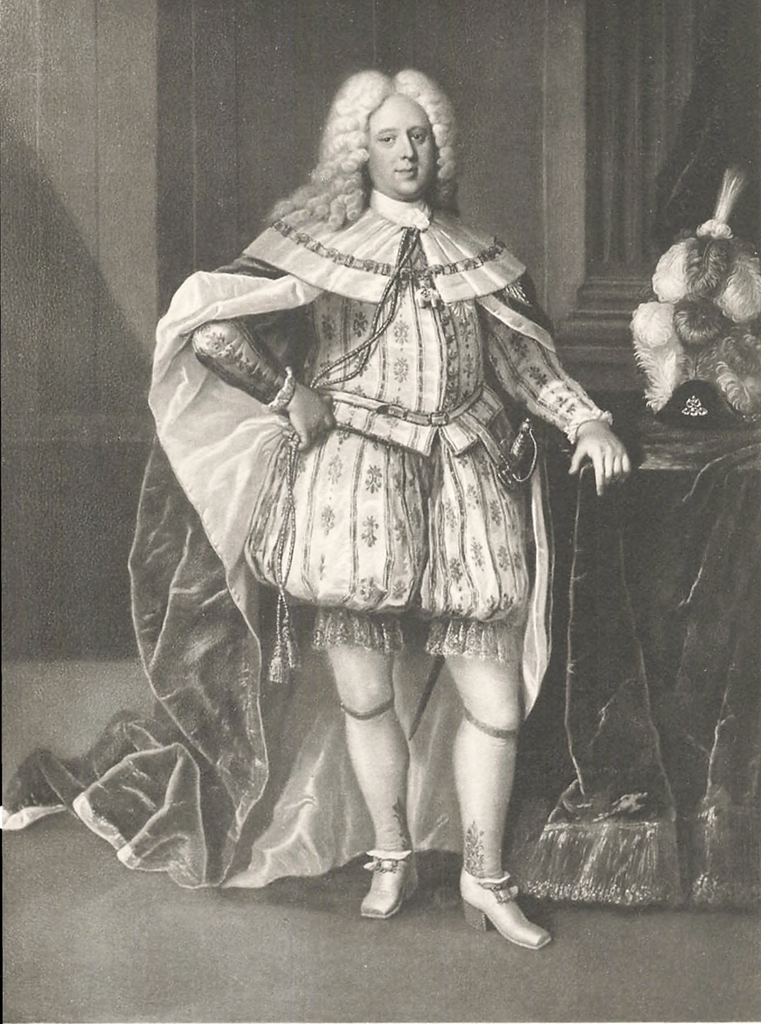
Christian Ditlev Reventlow.

In 1709 he held command of Danish forces in Scania during the Great Northern War. By the time of the Battle of Helsingborg, Reventlow had become sick, passing command to Jørgen Rantzau. In March 1713 King Frederick IV appointed Reventlow as the top official (overpræsident) of the city of Altona. Opposite Hamburg, the harbor of Altona was on the banks of the Elbe river and at that time one of the more important Danish harbour towns. The city had been plundered by Swedish forces and had to be rebuilt. His task was to supervise the reconstruction program. In 1732 in the aftermath of the death of King Frederick IV of Denmark, he was dismissed from his position at Altona.

== Personal life ==
Reventlow was first betrothed to Anna Christiane Gyldenløve (1676–1689), who died at 13 years of age. Anna Christiane was the daughter of King Christian V of Denmark and Sophie Amalie Moth, Countess of Samsø.

In 1700, he was married Benedikta Margarethe von Brockdorff (1678–1739). Among his children were

- Conrad Detlev (1704–1750) married in 1731 Wilhelmina Augusta (1704–1749), daughter of Prince Christian Charles of Schleswig-Holstein-Sonderburg-Plön-Norburg
- Christian Ditlev Reventlow (1710–1775), Danish Privy Councillor
- Christine Armgard von Reventlow (1711–1779), married Frederick Charles, Duke of Schleswig-Holstein-Sonderburg-Plön.
