= Frydenlund =

Historic house near Vedbæk, Denmark

Fredenslund
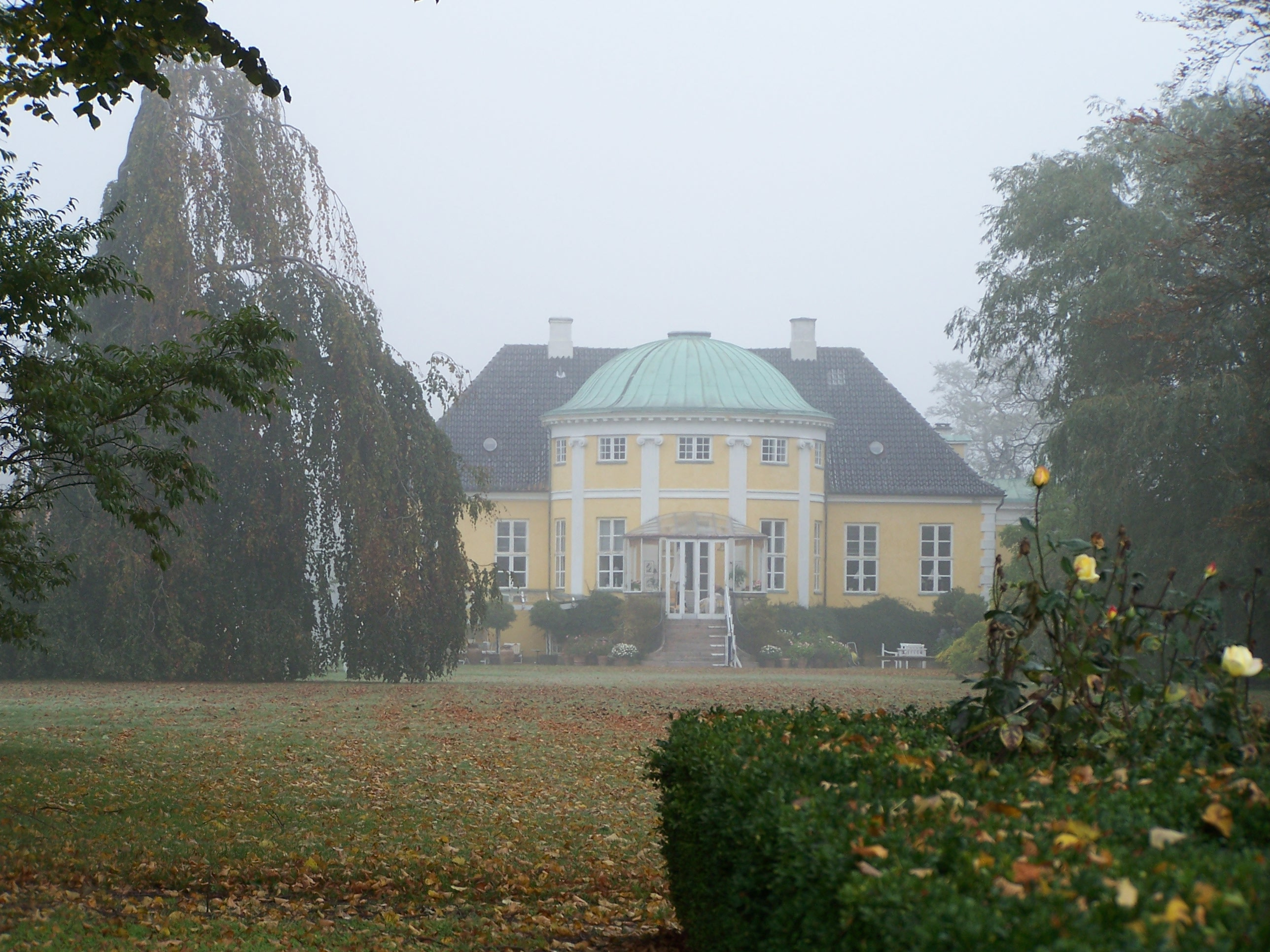
- Frydenlund
- Interactive map of the Fredenslund area

General information
- Architectural style: Neoclassical
- Location: Rudersdal, Denmark, Denmark
- Coordinates: 55°50′27.34″N 12°33′29.11″E
- Construction started: 1726
- Completed: 1729

Design and construction
- Architect: Jørgen Henrich Rawert

Frydenlund is a historic house near Vedbæk north of Copenhagen, Denmark.

== History ==
=== The royal pavilion ===
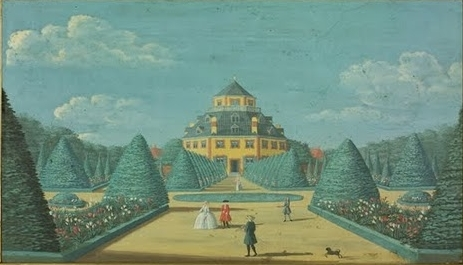
Frydenlund painted by Johan Jacob Bruun in 1749

The first structure at the site was a hunting lodge built just north of the royal deer park Jægersborg Dyrehave which was established in 1670. It was acquired by Conrad von Reventlow in the 1680s. Originally from Holstein, he now lived at Clausholm Castle and gave the pavilion the name Freudenlund. After his death, the property was passed on to his daughter, Anne Sophie, who married King Frederick IV Morganatically in 1712. From 1722 to 1726, after their second marriage in 1721, which gave Anne Sophie status of queen, court architect Johan Cornelius Krieger carried out an expansion of Frydenlund.

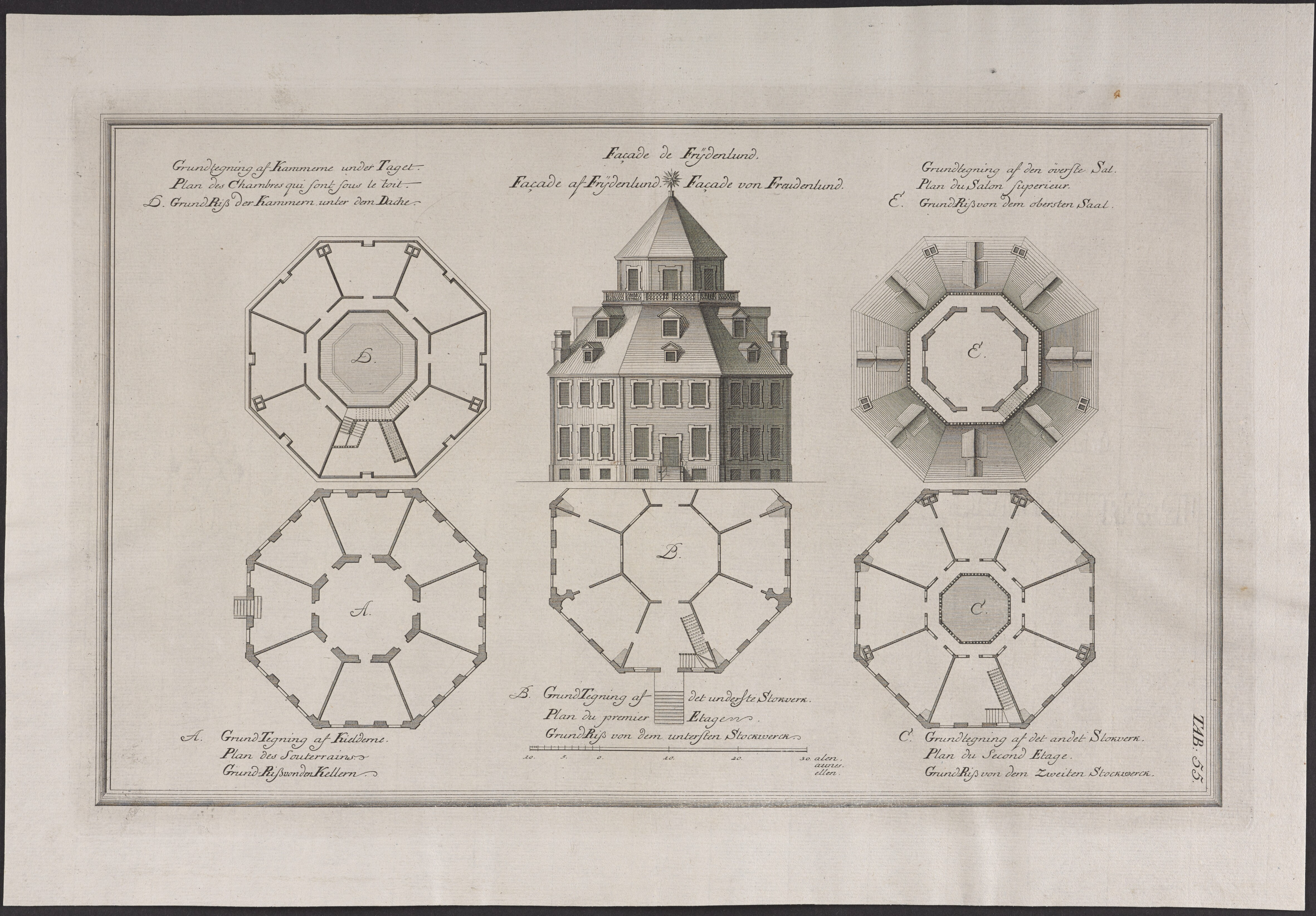
Frydenlund.

In the first half of the 1740s, the house was put at the disposal of General Charles Christian Erdmann, Duke of Württemberg-Oels along with the Württemberg Mansion in Copenhagen (now Lerches Gård).

King Frederick V refurbished the house and gave it to Crown Prince Christian in 1760. In connection with their marriage in 1764, he gave Frydendal to Queen Caroline Matilda of Great Britain. It was the preferred hideaway for her and her lover Johann Friedrich Struensee during their love affair. A new wooden mansion designed by Caspar Frederik Harsdorff was built in Lille Dyrehave in 1770.

=== Later changes ===
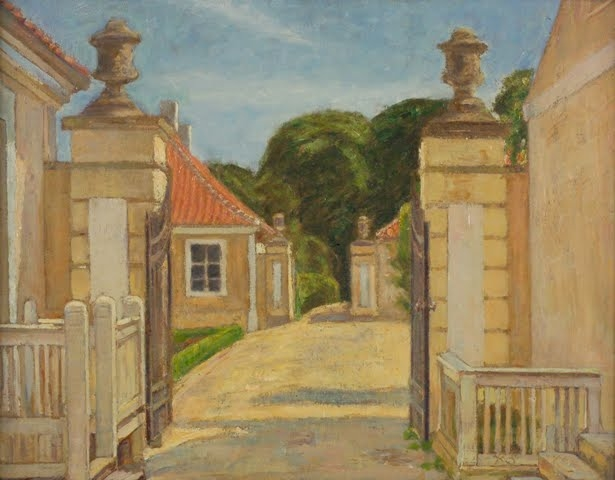
Frydenlund's vatehouse painted by Karl Schou in 1915

Harsdorff's mansion was destroyed by fire in 1793. The Crown then sold the estate to Karl Adolf Boheman, a Swedish mystic, Freemason, merchant who worked for the mystic society "The Enlightened of Avignon" on the commission of Prince Charles of Hesse-Kassel. He refurbished and expanded Krieger's old house with the assistance of Jørgen Henrich Rawert.

=== Recent history ===
American-Danish entertainer Victor Borge purchased the property in 1957. In 1960, he sold it to Haldor Topsøe who established a research centre in the buildings.

== Architecture ==
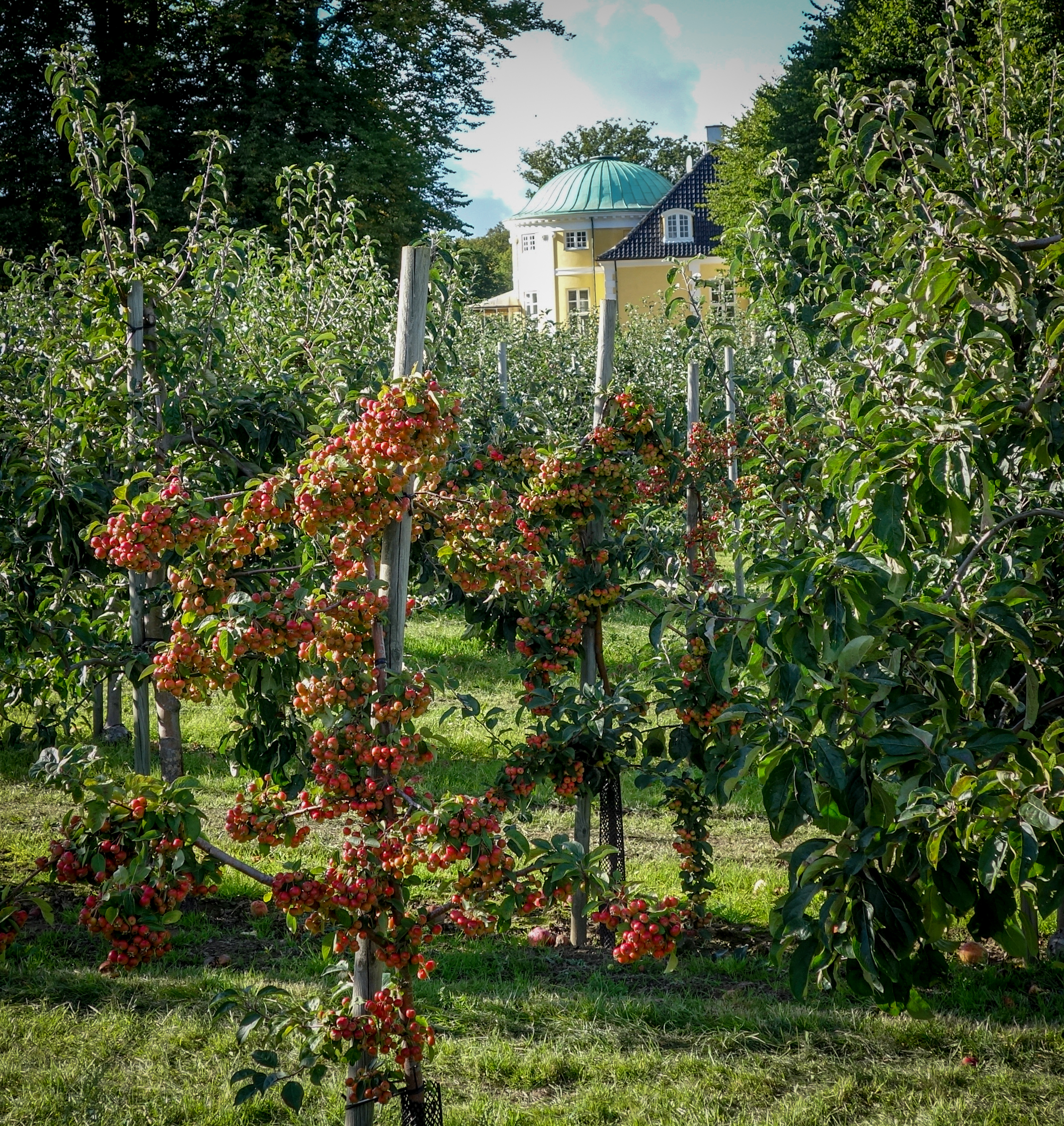
The house viewed from the orchard1749

The current house is a three-winged Neoclassical building. It is attributed to Jørgen Henrich Rawert. It was restored by Carl Brummer in 1907–09.

Krieger's original house from the 1720s was a tall, octagonal building with timber framing. It is still clearly visible as a rounded projection on the main wing.

The complex was listed in 1918. The architectural firm Berten && Schewing was commissioned to make a masterplan for restoration and development of the buildings in 2010.

== Owners ==
- (-1669) H. Ehm (kobbermølle)
- (1670-1683) M. Friis
- (17xx-17xx) Conrad Reventlow
- (17xx-17xx) Anna Sophie Reventlow
- (17xx-1793) Kronen
- (1793-1803) Carl Adolf Boheman
- (1803-1813) W.B. Linstow
- (1813-1840) Cecilie M. E. Schouw
- (1840-1843) H. Outzen Bjørn
- (1843-1846) J.L. Gottlieb
- (1846-1875) Gertrudine Rieffestahl
- (1875-1907) L. Castenschiold
- (1907-1929) C.B. Thøgersen
- (1929-1957) G.K. Schiørring
- (1957-1960) Victor Borge
- (1960-) Haldor Topsøe
