= Ulrik Adolf Holstein =

Danish nobleman

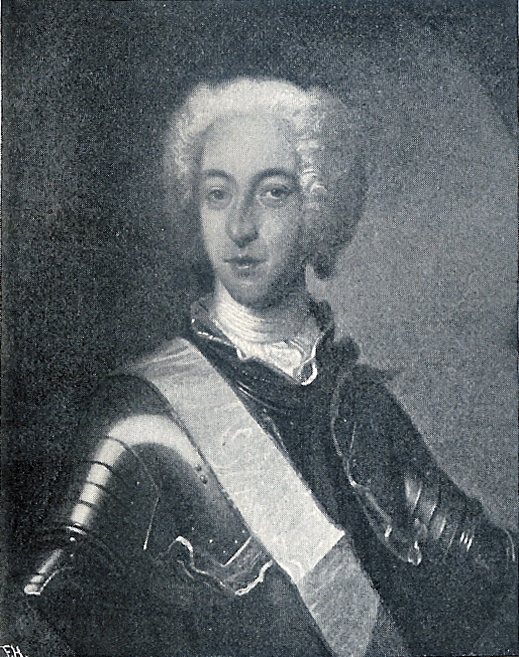

Grand Chancellor of Denmark
- Predecessor: Christian Christophersen Sehested
- Successor: Iver Rosenkrantz
- Born: 14 April 1664
- Died: 21 August 1737 (aged 73)
- Spouse: Christine Reventlow

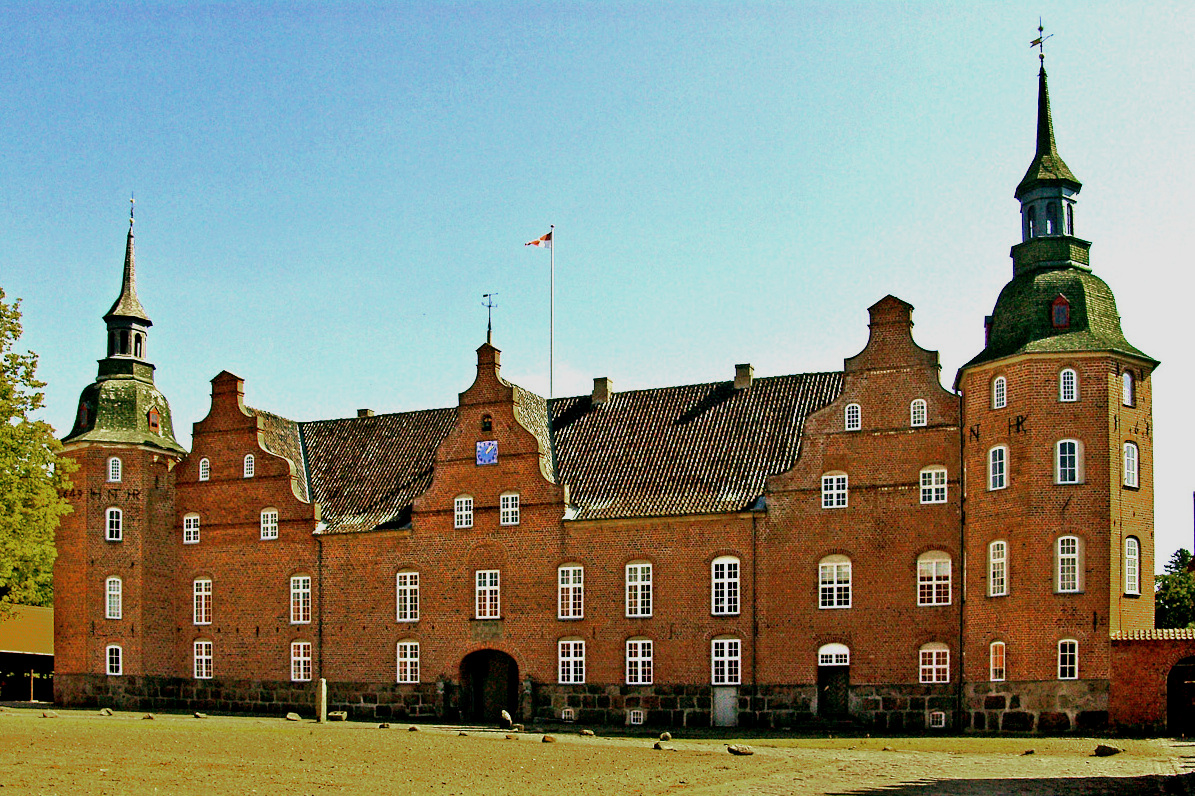
Holsteinborg Castle

Ulrik Adolf Holstein, Greve til Holsteinborg (14 April 1664 – 21 August 1737) was a Danish nobleman and statesman.

== Life ==
He was born in Schleswig-Holstein. His father, Adam Christopher von Holstein (1631–1690) owned Netzeband and Buchholtz in Mecklenburg; his mother was Cathrine Christine Reventlow of Futterkamp (1647–1704). He was the brother of Christian Frederik von Holstein (1678–1747), Ditlev von Holstein (1669–1721) and Henning Christopher von Holstein (1679–1753).

In 1679 he became a page to Crown Prince Frederick and found favour, becoming a noble (freiherr) in 1700. He was removed from court in 1703 after attempting to dissuade the King from marrying royal mistress Elisabeth Helene von Vieregg (1679–1704). He became a bailiff in Flensburg, was appointed Privy council (Geheimrat) in 1703 and held this office for a number of years.

Ulrik Adolf Holstein acquired the Barony of Fuirendal in 1700. In 1707, he also acquired Holsteinborg and Snedinge manors. Holstein was created Count of Holsteinborg in 1708. In 1718 he was one of the officials advised King Frederick IV of Denmark. He was sent on a diplomatic mission to England in 1718. Holstein was given a seat in the Council in 1719. In 1721, and Holstein was appointed Grand Chancellor. He was removed from office on the King's death in 1730.

== Personal life ==
In 1700, he married Christine Reventlow (1672–1757), daughter of Count Conrad von Reventlow (1644–1708) and Anna Margrethe Gabel (1651–1678). In 1712, he helped the King to abduct his wife's sister Anne Sophie Reventlow (1693–1743), who became the second wife of Frederick IV in 1721.

== Note ==
- The information in this article is based on that in its Danish equivalent.

Political offices
| Preceded by Christian Christophersen Sehested | Grand Chancellor of Denmark; 1721 - 1730 | Succeeded by Iver Rosenkrantz |
