= Anne Sophie Reventlow =

Queen of Denmark and Norway from 1721 to 1730

Anne Sophie von Reventlow
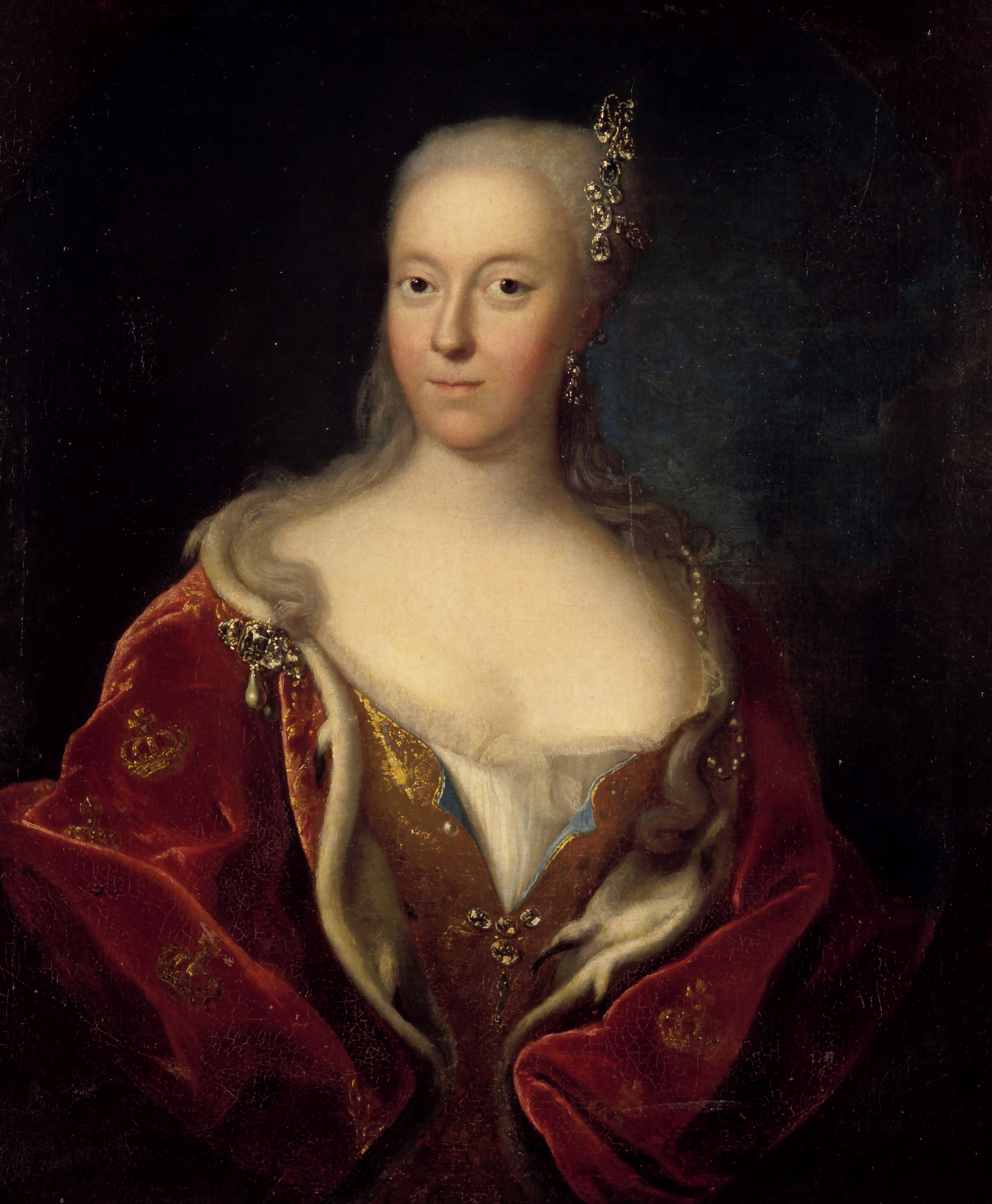
- Portrait c. 1725

Queen consort of Denmark and Norway
- Tenure: 4 April 1721 – 12 October 1730
- Coronation: May 1721
- Born: 16 April 1693; Clausholm Castle, Favrskov Municipality
- Died: 7 January 1743 (aged 49)
- Burial: Roskilde Cathedral
- Spouse: Frederick IV of Denmark (m. 1721; died 1730)
- Issue: Fredericka Sophie Reventlow; Fredericka Conradine Reventlow; Princess Christiana Amalia; Prince Frederik Christian; Prince Charles
- House: Reventlow
- Father: Count Conrad von Reventlow
- Mother: Sophie Amalie von Hahn

Anne Sophie von Reventlow (Danish: Anna Sophie; 16 April 1693 – 7 January 1743) was Queen of Denmark and Norway from 1721 to 1730 as the second wife of Frederick IV of Denmark and Norway.

== Early life ==
Born in Clausholm castle, into an ancient House of Reventlow, a Dano-German noble family originated in the County of Holstein, Countess Anna Sophie von Reventlow was the youngest daughter of Count Conrad von Reventlow, who served as Grand Chancellor of Denmark, by his second wife, Sophie Amalie von Hahn (1664-1722). About Anna Sophie's childhood nothing is known apart from the fact that her upbringing was educationally inadequate: Answered letters show that she made clumsy use of Danish, French and German. She was described as beautiful and lively, with "black, fiery eyes."

== Spouse by bigamy ==
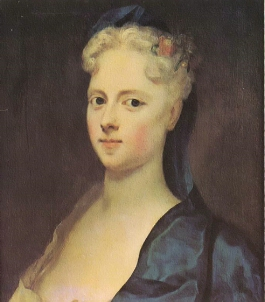
Pastel portrait of Anne Sophie in her youth

In 1711 the King encountered Anne Sophie at a masquerade ball in Koldinghus, where the royal family resided that season. He wanted her to become his mistress, which her mother refused to allow. The king abducted her on 26 June 1712 from her parents' estate, Clausholm, with the apparent support of her half-sister Christine Sophie and her husband Count Ulrik Adolph Holstein of Holsteinborg. The King took her to Skanderborg castle, where they were married morganatically in a wedding ceremony conducted by Thomas Clausen.

The King's wife was still alive, which made the wedding bigamy. However, he had committed bigamy once before, with Elisabeth Helene von Vieregg. The church authorities had not forbidden the king to engage in polygamy, as there were doctrines based on the biblical era polygamy of Hebrew patriarchs.

The king installed Reventlow in a house on Bag Børsen (present day Slotsholmsgade 8), close to Christiansborg Palace, in Copenhagen. She was given the title Duchess of Schleswig. In 1713, she was granted Vallø as a fief. Her mother, however, did not support the marriage and did not reconcile with her daughter until 1718.

Anna Sophie was supported by her sister Ulrike Eleonora and her brother-in-law, Count Ferdinand Anton of Danneskjöld-Laurvig (1688-1754), whom she often visited. As the king preferred to spend time in the house of Anna Sophie rather than with the reclusive queen, her home gradually became well frequented by the members of nobility who sought the king's favor. The king did not wish to be so public about the bigamy as such, and Anna Sophie was by many regarded as merely his official mistress.

== Queen ==

On 4 April 1721, soon after the death of Queen Louise, Frederick IV married Anne Sophie a second time. This time, the wedding was formal and conducted with grand ceremony. Nor was this marriage was not declared morganatic, although it was regarded as scandalous by the Danish nobility and foreign courts alike, marriages of rulers to subjects having come to be regarded as unequal.

The hasty remarriage of the king, conducted in the midst of the mourning period of the late queen, created some confusion among the public, as the official press had to issue news about the king's new marriage as well as the funeral and memorial services around the late queen in parallel.

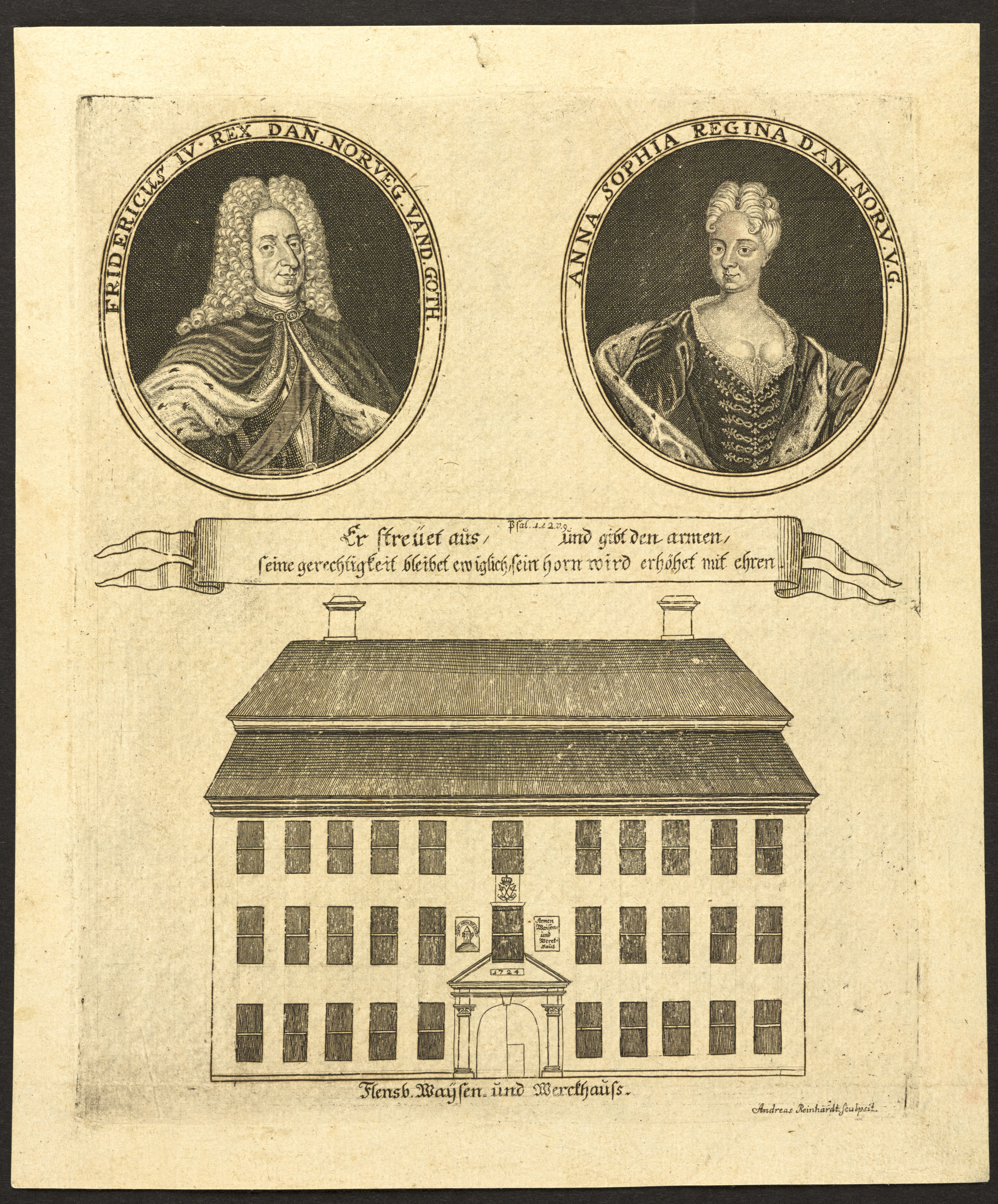
Fridericus IV. Rex ... Anna Sophia Regina.

The King had Anne Sophie crowned as queen at a hastily improvised ceremony at Frederiksberg Castle in May 1721, with Anna Sophie dressed in black with many jewels. It was noted, that her royal stepchildren did not kiss her hand, as ceremony dictated. Afterwards, she presided at the King's entry into the capital.

The personal relationship between the king and queen are described as very happy, and many love letters are preserved; the king called her a number of nicknames such as "Angel Heart", while she called him "Dearest King", and are noted to have been severely distressed during his illnesses. Anne Sophie gave birth to six children, three born before the official marriage (using the surname Reventlow) and three born after the official marriage (who were styled as Princes of Denmark), but none of them survived infancy; this was seen by members of the clergy and nobility as divine punishment for the bigamy.

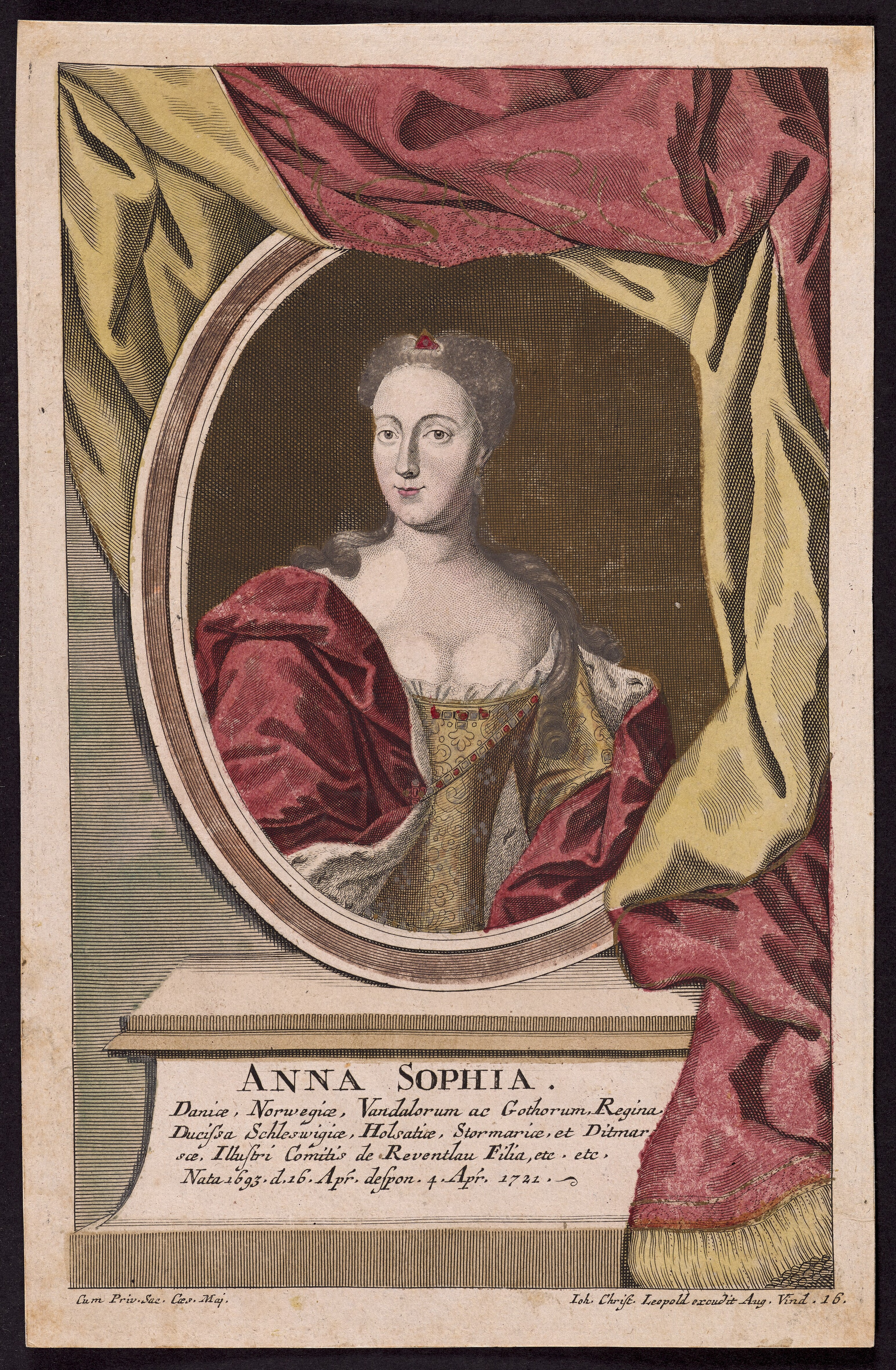
Anna Sophia.

Crown Prince Christian, who had been close to his mother, detested Anne Sophie and blamed her for his mother's suffering due to the king's neglect of her, although he did follow his father's demand that he treat Anne Sophie with at least outwardly respect for her position as queen and his stepmother. Anne Sophie showed good will to the crown prince and his spouse and never used her influence with the king against them for their hostility, and attempted to come to terms with them. Her brother-in-law, Prince Charles, and sister-in-law, Princess Sophia Hedwig, retired from the court in Copenhagen to their estate Vemmetofte in protest. Her stepdaughter Charlotte Amalie, however, quickly overcame her initial disapproval and came to like and support Anna Sophie. In 1725, the King made a will in which he ensured the rights of Anne Sophie after his death and made his son sign it.

Queen Anne Sophie's relatives, members of the Reventlow and Holstein families — popularly known as the Reventlowske Bande ('Reventlow Gang') — were placed in high positions. After her coronation, the king dismissed several of his previous officials and replaced them with relatives of Anne Sophie, notably her brother-in-law Ulrik Adolf Holstein, who was named Grand Chancellor, and a number of followers belonging to newly ennobled families from Germany. Her sister, the salonist Countess Christine Sophie Holstein, called "Madame Chancellor", exerted influence over affairs of state. Anne was blamed for the nepotism, but it is not known whether she actually exercised political influence, or if it was the King who wished to consolidate her role at court by appointing those loyal to her to powerful positions. In 1725, rumors pointing out the queen for handing out offices lead to an investigation by the king which resulted in several office holders, notable her brother-in-law, being exiled from court. Her personal guilt is uncertain, since Anne Sophie herself was not given any punishment and the documents of the investigation was destroyed. Her recommendation was important for anyone who sought the King's favour, and due to this, she was often used by petitioners and often successfully, something which gave her a certain amount of popularity.

Queen Anne Sophie are described as a lively beauty with good humor who enjoyed company, and court life was described as a reinvigorated and a jolly place during her years as queen. In her diary, which are preserved for the years 1721–23, she commented about her life in March 1723: "Gods will be done, if you will given me sunshine, I shall receive it with joy, but if it be crosses and misery, then let me suffer with patience. As you command, let med follow willingly." Like the king, she liked theatre and benefited the first public pioneer theatre in Denmark, the Lille Grønnegade Theatre, which was founded the year after she became queen. She did not have expensive habits herself, but are known to have been generous to others, both in public as well as in private. Due to the generosity of her donations to widows and the poor, she came to be called "The Protector of the Poor". In 1729, she created the charity foundation „Dronning Anna Sofies Stiftelse" ('Foundation of Queen Anne Sophie') to the benefit of the poor.

== Queen dowager ==
In 1730, Frederick IV died and was succeeded by his son Christian VI, who was well known to hate his stepmother. Frederick IV had left a will in which he had instructed his son to treat Anne Sophie with kindness and grant her the same privileges as Charlotte Amalie of Hesse-Cassel had been granted as queen dowager. However, Anne Sophie did not press the rights given to her in the will, but instead appealed to the new king to forgive her and show her mercy.

Christian VI stated that she had taken advantage of his father during his old age and weak health and that she had caused offence by years of open adultery; he did grant her an allowance but confiscated her property and expelled her to her birthplace, Clausholm Castle near Randers in Jutland. She was styled "Queen Anne Sophie", not "Queen Anne Sophie of Denmark and Norway" or "Queen dowager".

She spent the rest of her life under virtual house arrest on her estate, which the king did not allow her to leave without his express permission, which he never granted her. During the last thirteen years of her life, she devoted herself in religion and by charitable efforts among the peasantry on the estate.

Upon her death, King Christian VI allowed for public mourning and arranged to have her buried in Roskilde Cathedral, although to keep her from being buried with his father in the retroquire, he purchased the Trolle family chapel in the west end of the cathedral, and arranged for her and her children to be buried there.

== Issue ==
Anne Sophie Reventlow and King Frederick IV had six children, all of whom died in infancy:

- Fredericka Sophie Reventlow (born bef. 1721 – died in infancy); died before the official wedding of their parents.
- Fredericka Conradine Reventlow (born bef. 1721 – died in infancy); died before the official wedding of their parents.
- Stillborn child (bef. 1721); died before the official wedding of their parents.
- Princess Christiana Amalia (23 October 1723 – 7 January 1724).
- Prince Frederick Christian (1 June 1726 – 15 May 1727).
- Prince Charles (16 February 1728 – 8 July 1729).

== Ancestry ==
Ancestors of Anne Sophie Reventlow

8. Henneke von Reventlow
4. Detlef Reventlow
9. Sophie von Sperling
2. Conrad Reventlow
10. Henrik Rantzau
5. Christine Rantzau
11. Catharine Rantzau
1. Anne Sophie Reventlow
12. Christopher von Hahn
6. Vincentz Joachim von Hahn
13. Cathrine von Blücher
3. Sophie Amalie von Hahn
14. Erich Kaas
7. Sidsel Kaas
15. Susanne Sparre

Danish royalty
| Preceded by Louise of Mecklenburg-Güstrow | Queen consort of Denmark and Norway; 1721–1730 | Succeeded by Sophia Magdalene of Brandenburg-Kulmbach |
