= Henrik Harder =

Danish poet (1642–1683)

Henrik Harder (1642 – 8 January 1683) was a Danish Neo-Latin poet, who wrote epic poems and epigrams.

== Life ==
He was born Henrik Harder in Flensburg. At the age of 10 his family moved to Copenhagen, where he eventually died at the age of 42. His father, Claus (Claudius), was a courtier of Frederick III, King of Denmark. Henrik himself spent a number of years in England as the secretary to Christopher Lindenov (1639–1697), the Danish envoy to England from 1668–1672. His service complete, he explored Europe for a time, and then returned to Copenhagen and became tutor to count Niels Friis (Nicolaus Frisius, 1665–1699). He is buried in St. Peter's Church in Copenhagen.

== Works ==
- 1. An epic poem on the 1659 Assault on Copenhagen, Hafnia arctiori obsidione liberata (1660). It is reprinted in Rostgaard vol 2, pp. 305–346.
- 2. Panegyris Heroica in honorem Petri, Comitis a Griffenfeld (1675). It is reprinted in Rostgaard vol 2, pp. 347–364.
- 3. Canum cum cattis certamen, published under the pseudonym C. Catullus Caninius. It is reprinted (with explicit attribution to Harderus) in Rostgaard vol. 2, pp. 365–368.
- 4. Epigrammatum Libri Tres. Hafniae: Johannes Adolph, 1679. All three books are reprinted in Rostgaard vol 2, pp. 209–304.
- 5. Twenty-six further epigrams on mythological themes, written to accompany Wilhelm Salsmann's illustrations of Ovid's Metamorphoses, were posthumously printed in Sommer 1758, pp. 170–176.

A Danish translation of 100 epigrams appeared in 1903.

== Bibliography ==
- Dahl, Frederik (tr.) (1903). Henrik Harder: Et Hundrede Epigrammer: Udvalgte og oversatte fra Latin af Fredrik Dahl. Denmark: (n.p.).
- Johannes Moller, Cimbria literata sive scriptorum ducatus ut utriusque Slesvicensis et Holsatici historia literaria tripartita, Volume 1 (1744), p. 235.
- Rostgaard, F. (1693). Deliciae quorundam poëtarum danorum collectae et in II. tomos divisae. Netherlands: apud Jordanum Luchtmans. Vol. 2, pp. 209–368.
- Sommer, J. M. (1758). Miscellanea. Hafniae et Lipsiae: Pelt.
