= Holsteinborg =

Holsteinborg (Danish: Holstein Castle, Fort Holstein) may refer to:

- Holsteinborg Castle in eastern Denmark
  - Holsteinborg (surname), a Danish noble family
  - Holstein-Holsteinborg (surname), a Danish noble family
- Sisimiut, Greenland, in Danish also known as Holstensborg or Holsteinborg
