= Ernst Brandenburger =

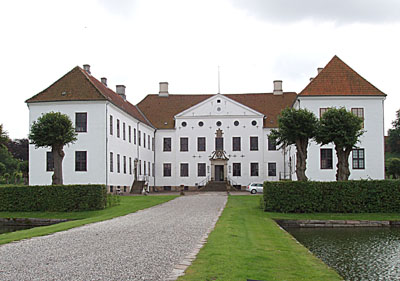
Clausholm Castle (1701)

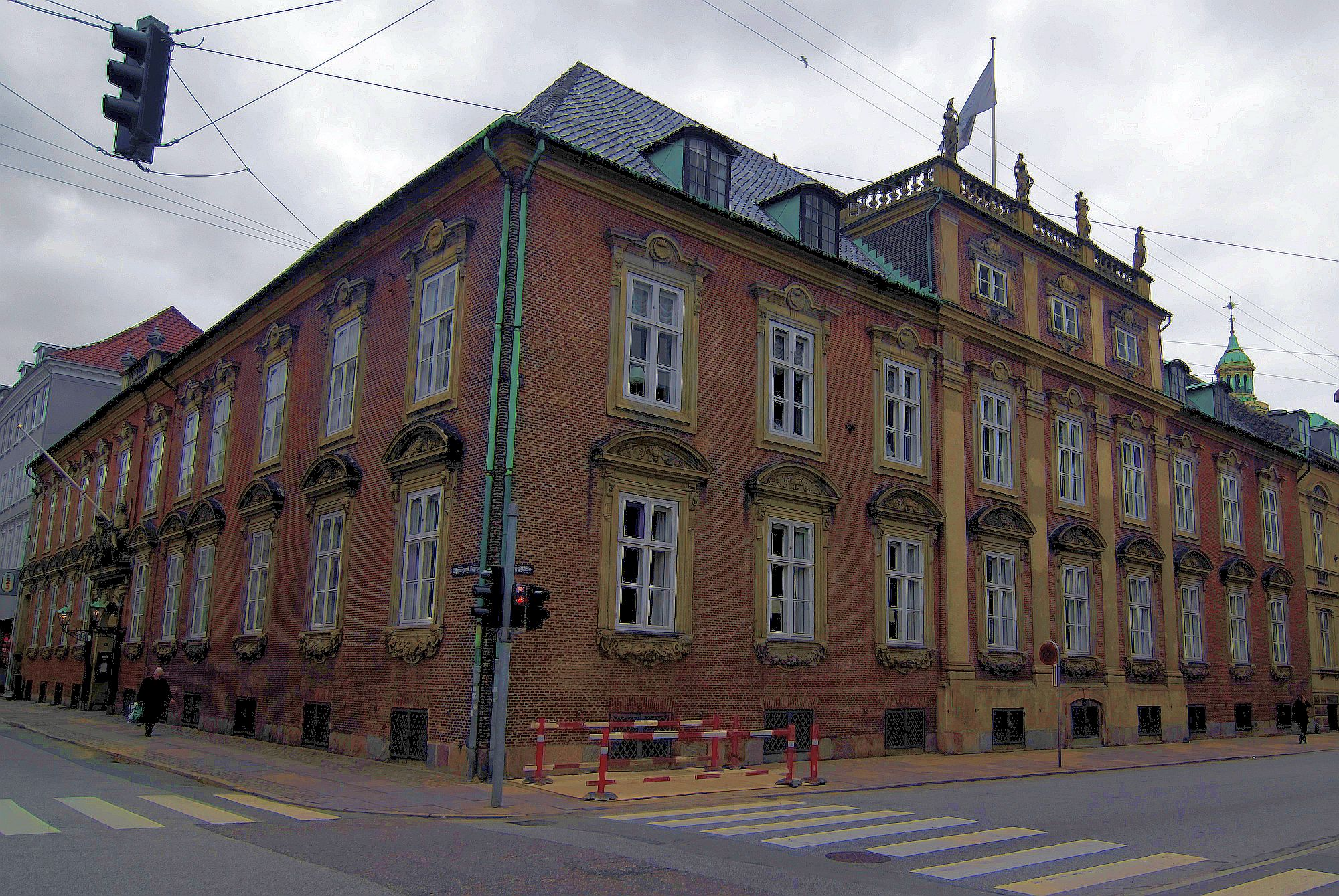
Gyldenløve's Little Mansion (1702)

Ernst Brandenburger (active from 1689 – died c. 1713) was a Danish master builder and entrepreneur who, through his collaboration with Christof Marselis (ca. 1670–1731) and Wilhelm Friedrich von Platen (1667-1732), left his mark on Danish Baroque architecture during the early reign of King Frederick IV.

== Biography ==
Brandenburger was engaged as master builder for the island of Funen in 1690. By 1695, he was working as master mason at the royal palaces and as constructor of royal buildings in 1698. From 1700 he also owned a brickyard in Vedbæk. He was royal building inspector from 1704 and until his death, presumably in 1713 since he was buried from St. Peter's Church in Copenhagen on 14 December that year.

== Works ==
- Stensballegård (c. 1691-93)
- Drawings for modernization of Clausholm (1692)
- Clausholm (1693-1701)
- Tower for Galten Church in Skanderborg (1697)
- Niels Juel's Mausoleum at Church of Holmen, Copenhagen(1697, demolished)
- Adaptions of Prince's House, Frederiksberg (1697 and 1705–06)
- Frederiksberg Palace, Frederiksberg (1699-1704, later altered)
- Frederiksberg Chapel, Frederiksberg (1710, with Christof Marselis and Wilhelm Friedrich von Platen )
- Riding Grounds at Frederiksborg Castle (1699, demolished)
- New Knight's Hall at Copenhagen Castle, Copenhagen (1700–01, demolished in 1730)
- Opera House, Fredericiagade, (Copenhagen) (1701–02, later altered, now part of High Court of Eastern Denmark)
- Avener's House, Slotsholmen, Copenhagen (1703–06, with Marselis and von Platen)
- Gyldenløve's Little Mansion, Bredgade/Dronningens Tværgade, Copenhagen (1700–02, later altered, now Håndværkerforeningen)
