= Conrad von Reventlow =

Danish statesman (1644–1708)

Conrad, Count of Reventlow
- Count
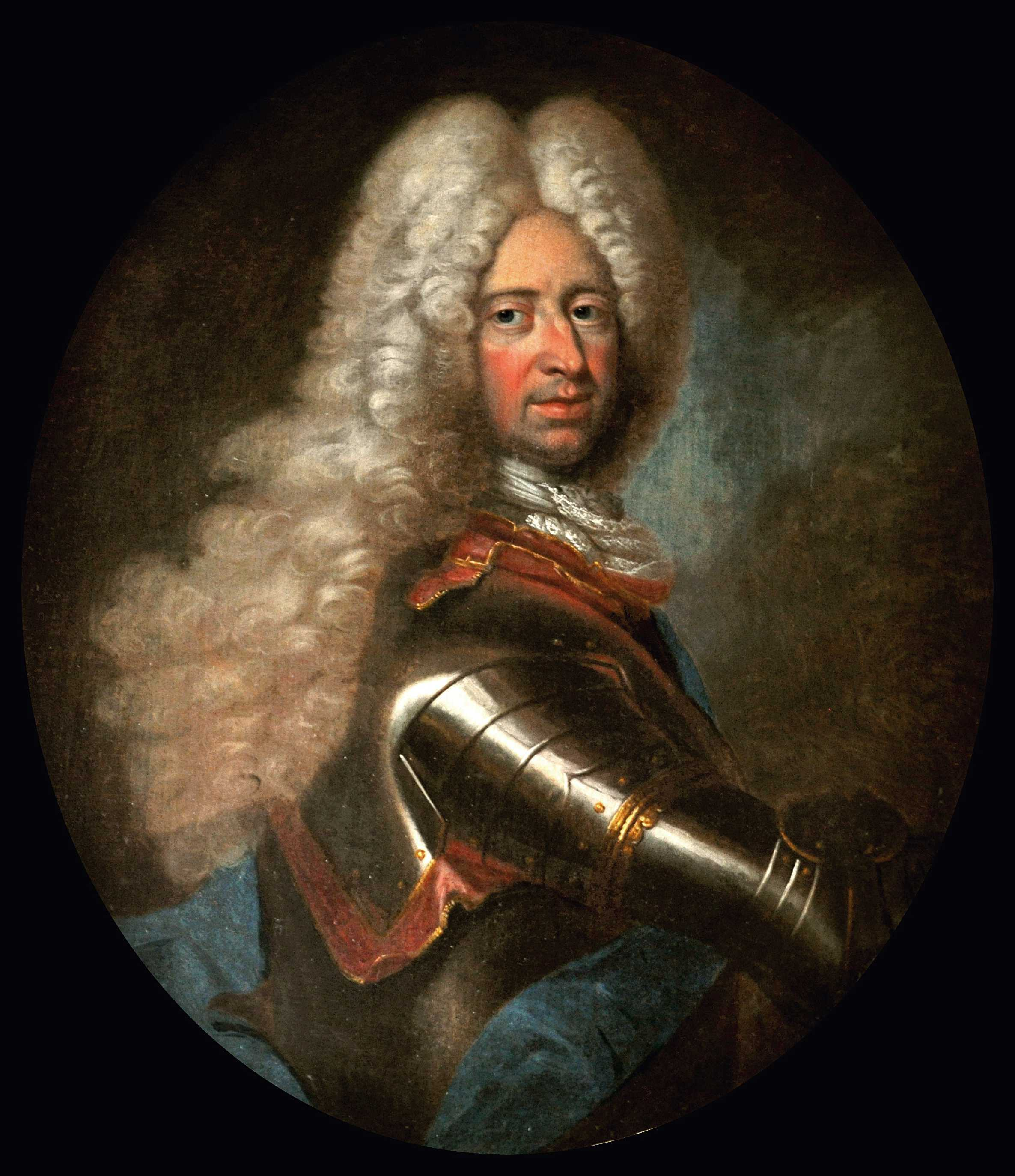

Grand Chancellor of Denmark
- Predecessor: Frederik Ahlefeldt
- Successor: Christian Christophersen Sehested
- Born: 21 April 1644; Copenhagen, Denmark
- Died: 21 July 1708 (aged 64); Clausholm estate, Denmark
- Buried: Schleswig Cathedral, Germany
- Noble family: Reventlow
- Spouses: Anna Margrethe Gabel (m. 1651; died 1678) Sophie Amalie von Hahn (m. 1664)
- Issue: Christian Ditlev, Count Reventlow; Christine Sophie, Countess Holstein; Anna Sophie, Queen of Denmark and Norway
- Father: Ditlev Reventlow
- Mother: Christine Rantzau

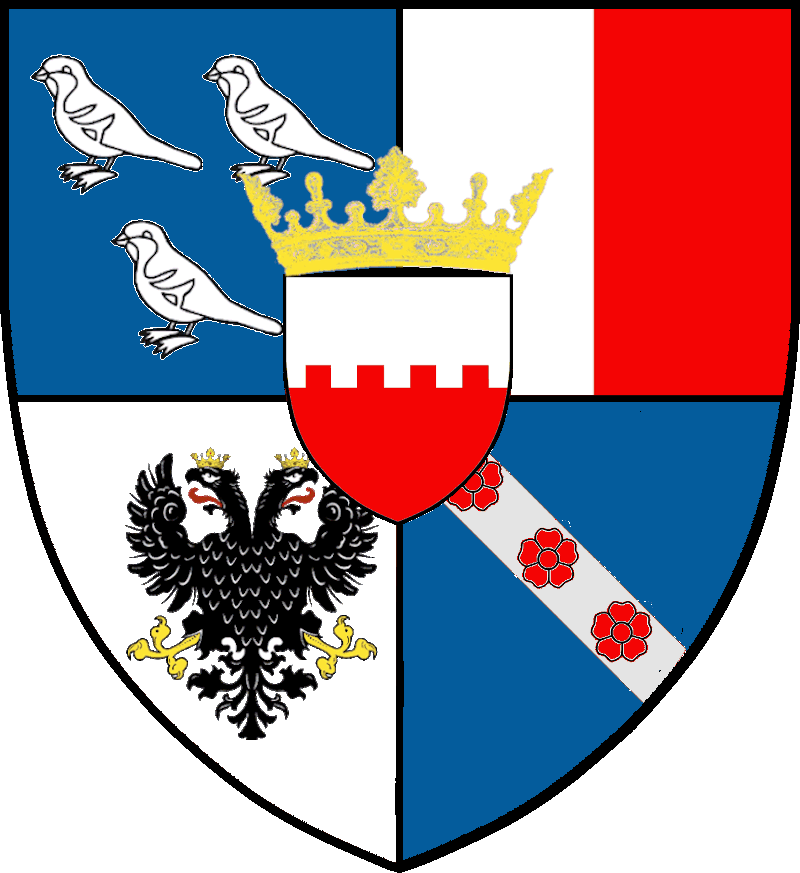
Coat of arms for count Conrad Reventlow from 1673

Conrad, Count von Reventlow (21 April 1644 – 21 July 1708) was a Danish statesman who was "Grand Chancellor of Denmark" (Danish: Danmarks storkansler), a predecessor title of the Prime Minister of Denmark, from 1699 until his death. His chancellorship occurred during the reign of King Frederick IV.

== Early life ==
Conrad von Reventlow was the son of Chancellor Ditlev von Reventlow (1600–1664) and his wife, Christine zu Rantzau (1618–1688). He was the brother of chamberlain Count Henning von Reventlow (1640–1705) and Chancellor, Count Ditlev von Reventlow (1654–1701).

== Career ==
=== Military career ===
He attended Academy in Sorø Academy and studied at the University of Orleans (1662). After attending university, Reventlow was called to the Danish Court in 1665, where he rose through various positions of responsibility. In the 1670s, he became a colonel in the Danish military. He recruited a regiment and distinguished himself in the Scanian War (1675–1679).

In 1700, Reventlow was deeply involved in the negotiations for peace with Sweden during that country's naval blockade of Copenhagen, an early event in the Great Northern War. Both France and the United Kingdom dealt extensively with Reventlow in their efforts to pressure Denmark to declare peace, in order to prevent a wider war from spreading into Europe.

=== Councillor and Grand Chancellor ===
In 1672, he became a land commissioner in Schleswig-Holstein. In 1685, Reventlow used his influence as a councilor to the court on behalf of privateer Benjamin Raule (1634–1707), to promote Danish acquisition of the island of St. Thomas in the West Indies.

In 1678, he applied for leave from service when his wife was incurably ill.

== Family ==
He married twice; with his first wife, Countess Anna Margarethe Gabel (1651–1678), he had two children:

- Christian Detlev, who played a prominent political role
- Christine Sophie (1672–1757) became an influential advisor to her sister and brother-in-law, the Danish queen and king.

With his second wife, Sophie Amalie Hahn of Seekapm (1664–1722), he had three children:

- Anne Margrethe (1682–1710), married Hans Schack, 2nd Count of Schackenborg
- Ulrikke Eleonor (1690–1754), married Count Ferdinand Anton Gyldenløve, a grandson of King Frederick III by his mistress, Margrethe Pape
- Anna Sophie (1693–1743), married Frederick IV in 1721, becoming the first modern Queen of Denmark not to have been born a princess.

His sarcophagus in the Schleswig Cathedral (Schleswiger Dom) was designed by the renowned sculptor Thomas Quellinus.

== Ancestry ==
Ancestors of Conrad von Reventlow

8. Lorenz von Reventlow
4. Henning von Reventlow
9. Anna von Below
2. Ditlev von Reventlow
10. Cord von Sperling
5. Sophie von Sperling
11. Mette von Stralendorff
1. Conrad von Reventlow
12. Hans zu Rantzau
6. Henrik zu Rantzau
13. Margarethe of Ahlefeldt
3. Christine zu Rantzau
14. Cai zu Rantzau
7. Catharine zu Rantzau
15. Elisabeth zu Rantzau

== Additional sources ==
- Jirí Louda and Michael MacLagan, Lines of Succession: Heraldry of the Royal Families of Europe, 2nd edition (London, U.K.: Little, Brown and Company, 1999), table 19.

Political offices
Preceded by Frederik Ahlefeldt	Grand Chancellor of Denmark; 1699–1708	Succeeded by Christian Christophersen Sehested
