= Clausholm Castle =

Manor house in Favrskov Municipality, Denmark

Coordinates: 56.3847°N 10.1701°E

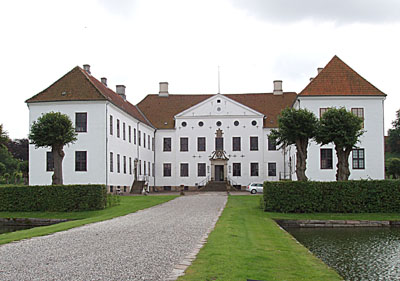
Clausholm Castle

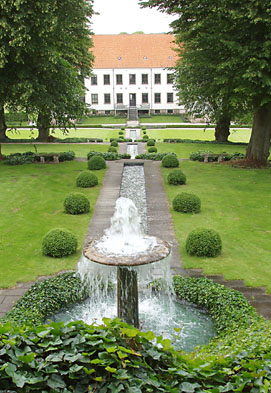
The Baroque garden at Clausholm Castle

Clausholm Castle is a large Danish country house located some 12 km southeast of Randers in eastern Jutland. It is one of Denmark's finest Baroque buildings.

== History ==
The castle's origins appear to go back to the 12th century but it is first mentioned in the 14th century when its owner, Lage Ovesen, was one of the leaders of the Jute uprising against Valdemar Atterdag. At the time, Clausholm was a four-winged building surrounded by a moat. But when the first Danish Prime Minister, Grand Chancellor Conrad von Reventlow, acquired the property in the 1690s, it was in such a sorry state that he pulled it down and had today's two-storeyed, three-winged building constructed in its place. It was designed by Danish architect Ernst Brandenburger with the assistance of the Swede Nicodemus Tessin the Younger.

The castle was designed so that the Grand Chancellor could live on the ground floor while the second floor, with higher and more decorative ceilings, was intended for royal visitors. Both the castle and the park are among Denmark's earliest and finest from the Baroque period.

It was thanks to Reventlow's daughter, Anna Sophie Reventlow, that the castle gained fame when she was abducted by an amorous king, Frederick IV. Anna Sophie became his queen in 1721 but when he died in 1730, she returned to Clausholm with her court.

It is also used for Den Store Bagedyst, a baking competition broadcast on DR1

In the castle's chapel, decorated by Anna Sophie, is one of Denmark's oldest organs built around 1700 by the Botzen brothers from Copenhagen.

== Restoration ==
As there was no running water or electricity at the castle, for many years it was only inhabited during the summer. But in 1964, the new owners, Henrik and Ruth Berner, modernised the facilities with the result that the castle came back to life.

Restoration work continued for a considerable period, great care being taken to protect the historical building which had remained practically untouched since the 1730s. The efforts were rewarded in 1994 when Queen Margrethe presented the castle with the Europa Nostra Prize for outstanding heritage work.

== Park and estate ==
The large Baroque park with its fountains and avenues was designed in the 18th century. In 2009, with the support of the Realdania Foundation, the park was thoroughly renovated.

The 900-hectare estate includes Schildenseje, Sophie-Amaliegård, Sophienlund and Estrupgård.
