= Frederick IV of Denmark =

King of Denmark and Norway from 1699 to 1730

Frederick IV
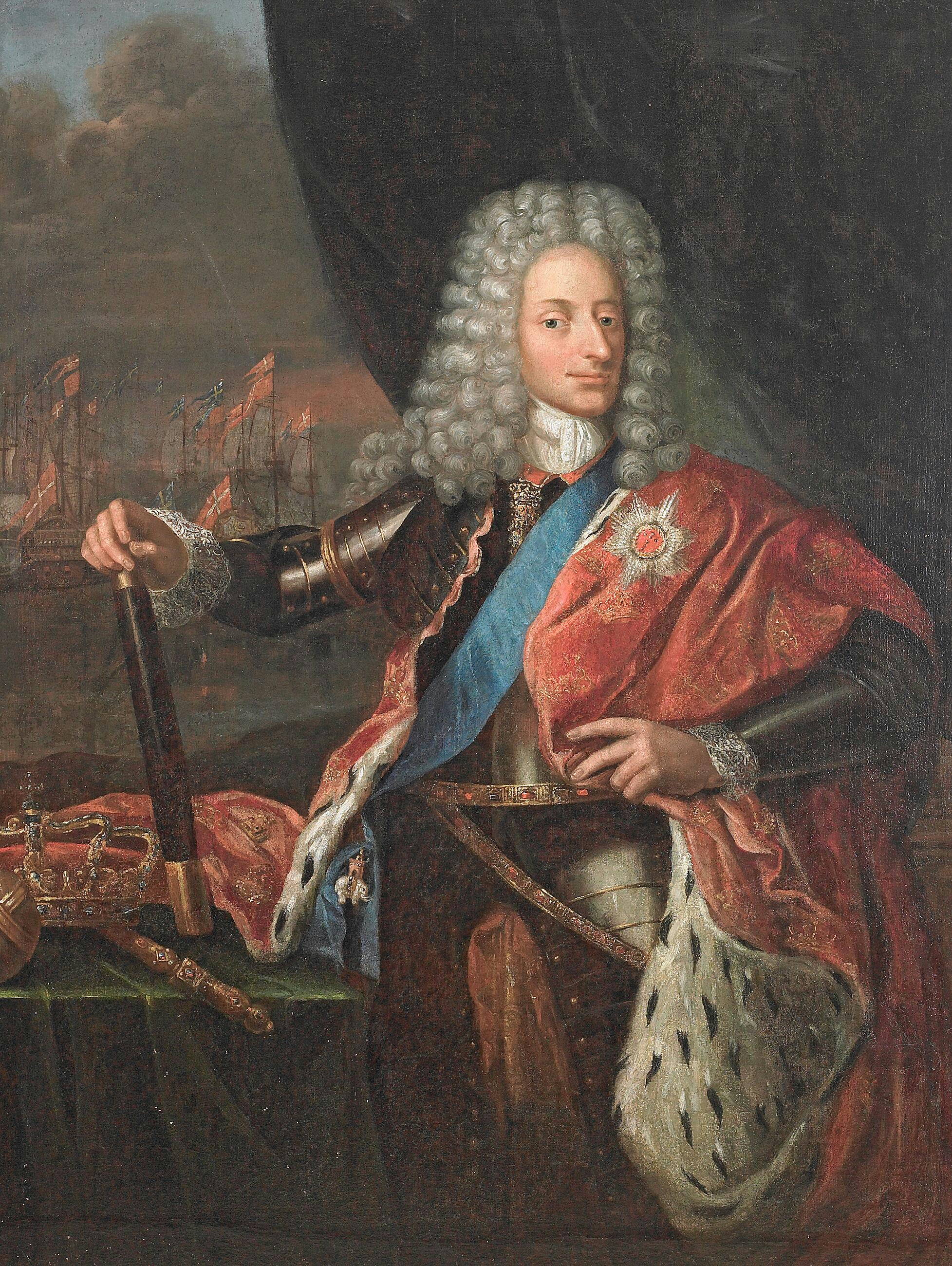

King of Denmark and Norway
- Reign: 25 August 1699 – 12 October 1730
- Coronation: 15 April 1700; Frederiksborg Palace Chapel
- Predecessor: Christian V
- Successor: Christian VI
- Grand Chancellors: See list: Conrad von Reventlow Christian Christophersen Sehested Ulrik Adolf Holstein
- Born: 11 October 1671; Copenhagen Castle, Copenhagen, Denmark
- Died: 12 October 1730 (aged 59); Odense Palace, Odense, Denmark
- Burial: Roskilde Cathedral
- Spouses: Louise of Mecklenburg-Güstrow (m. 1695; died 1721) Elisabeth Helene von Vieregg (m. 1703; died 1704) Anne Sophie Reventlow (m. 1721)
- Issue: Christian VI; Princess Charlotte Amalie
- House: Oldenburg
- Father: Christian V of Denmark
- Mother: Charlotte Amalie of Hesse-Kassel
- Religion: Lutheran
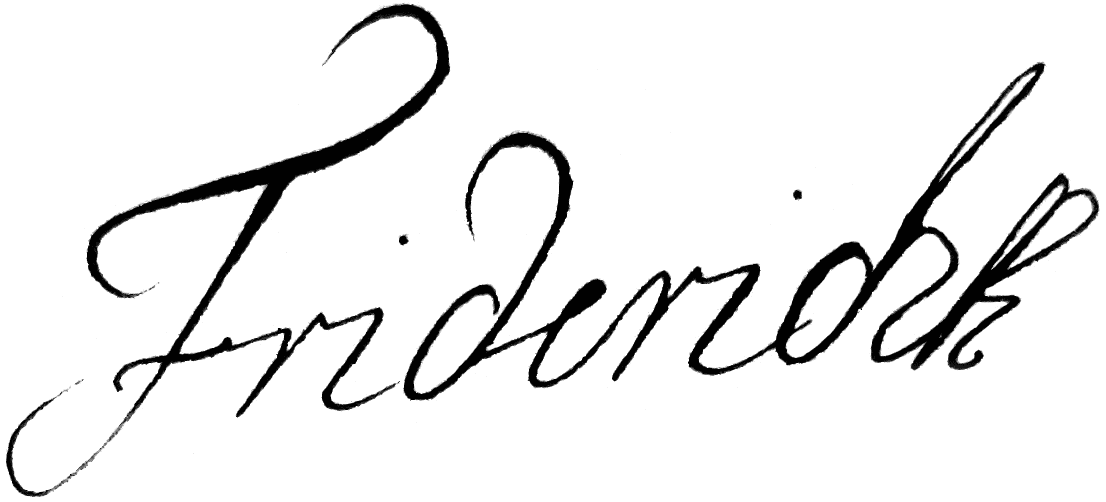
- Signature

Frederick IV (Danish: Frederik; 11 October 1671 – 12 October 1730) was King of Denmark and Norway from 1699 until his death. Frederick was the son of Christian V of Denmark–Norway and his wife Charlotte Amalie of Hesse-Kassel.

== Early life ==
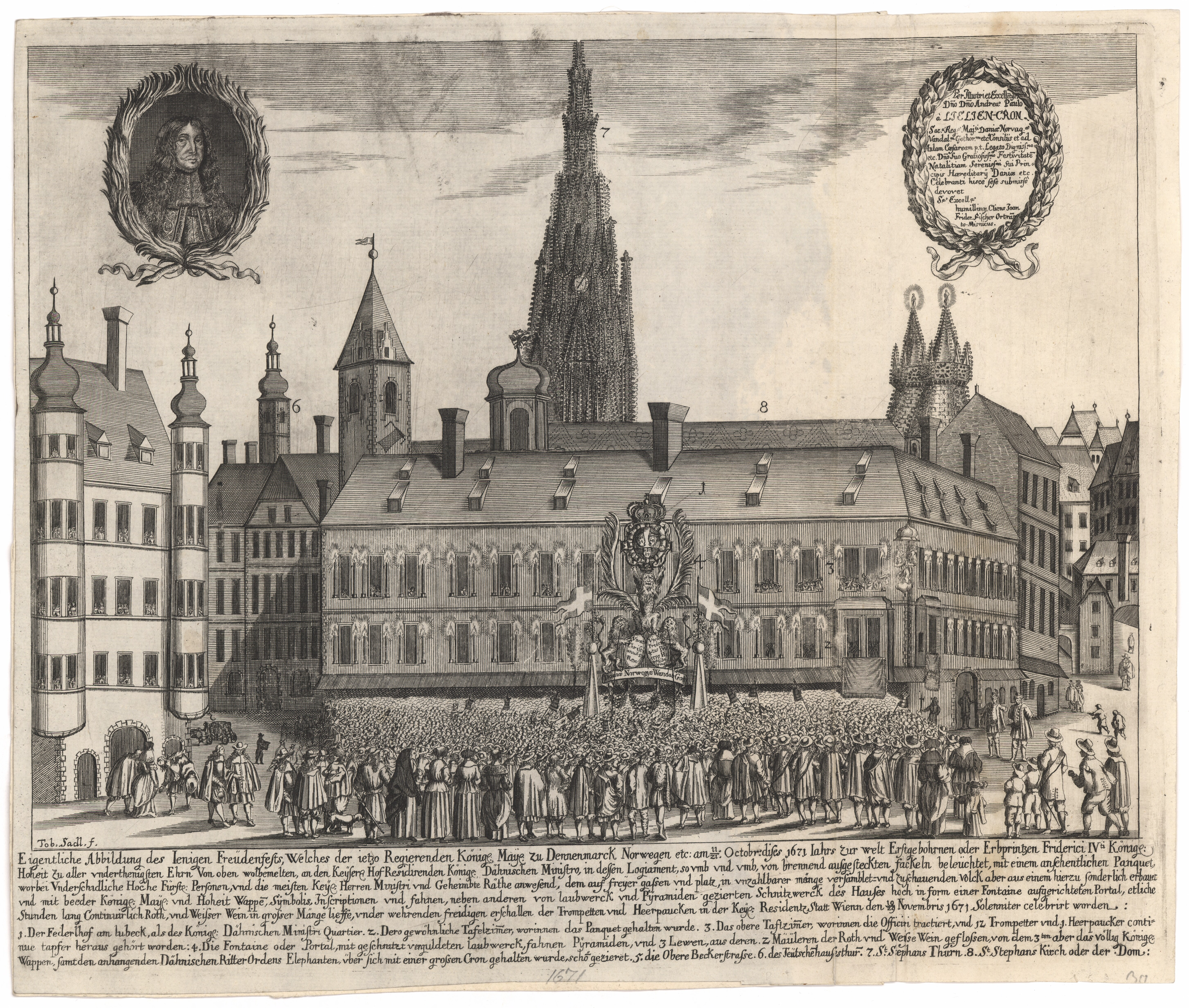
Print commemorating the birth of Crown Prince Frederick (IV).

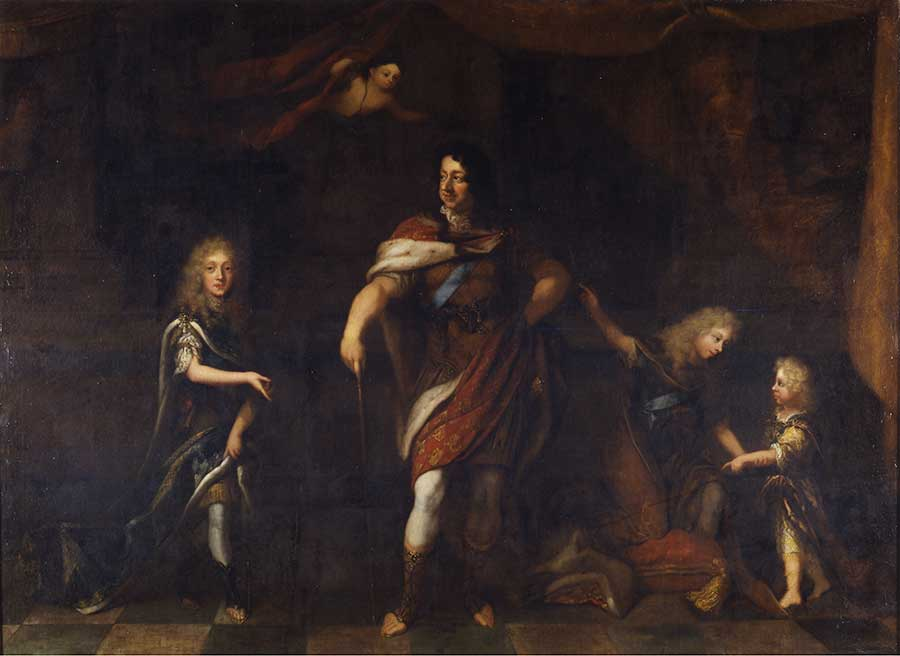
Crown-prince Frederick (IV), with his father in centre and his brothers Christian and Charles

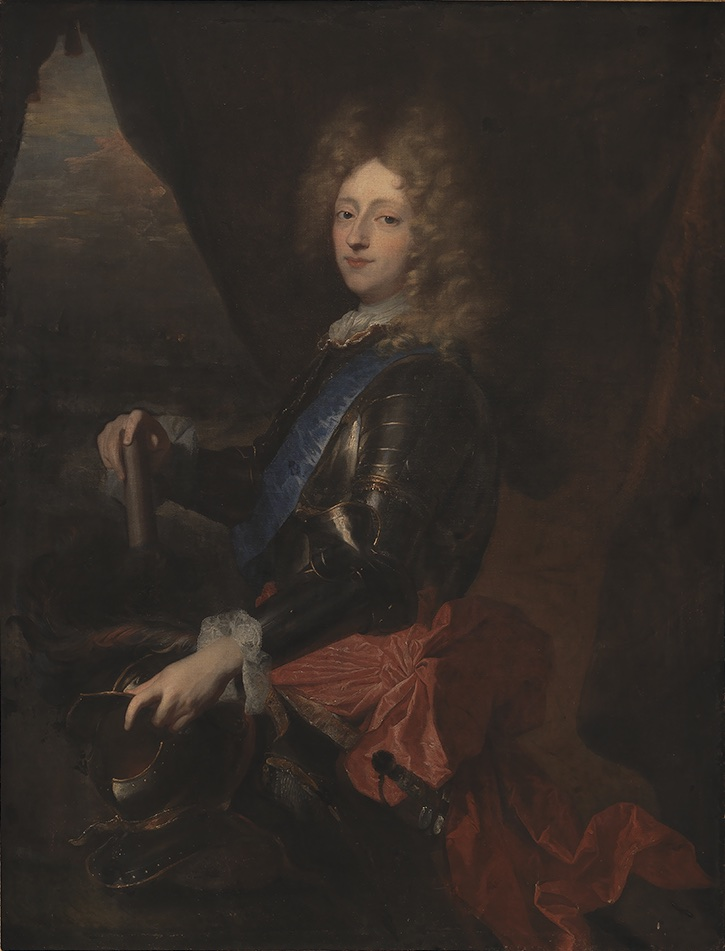
Frederick as Crown Prince by Hyacinthe Rigaud, 1693

Frederick was born on 11 October 1671 at Copenhagen Castle as the eldest son of King Christian V and his spouse Charlotte Amalie of Hesse-Kassel. His grandfather King Frederick III had died a year and a half before he was born, and as the eldest son of the ruling King he was thus Crown Prince from birth. The newborn prince was baptised the same evening with the name Frederick by the royal confessor Hans Leth. The royal baptismal font, which has been used for the baptism of the royal children in Denmark ever since, was used for the first time at his christening.

At the age of 18, he was given a seat on the Council of State as the heir apparent to the throne.

As Crown Prince, Frederick broadened his education by travelling in Europe, led by his chamberlain Ditlev Wibe. He was particularly impressed by the architecture in Italy and, on his return to Denmark, asked his father for permission to build a summer palace on Solbjerg, as the hill in Valby was then known, the future site of Frederiksberg Palace. The one-storey building, probably designed by Ernst Brandenburger, was completed in 1703.

Frederick was allowed to choose his future wife from a number of Protestant royal daughters in northern Germany. In 1695, he visited the court of Gustav Adolph, Duke of Mecklenburg-Güstrow in Güstrow. But his visit there was cut short by a message telling of his brother Prince Christian's serious illness (he had, in fact, already died in Ulm). Frederick later returned to Güstrow, where he was forced to choose the eldest of the unmarried princesses. On 5 December 1695 at Copenhagen Castle, he married Louise of Mecklenburg-Güstrow, herself a great-great-granddaughter of Frederick II of Denmark.

At the death of Christian V on 25 August 1699, the couple became King and Queen of Denmark–Norway. They were crowned on 15 April 1700 in the chapel of Frederiksborg Palace.

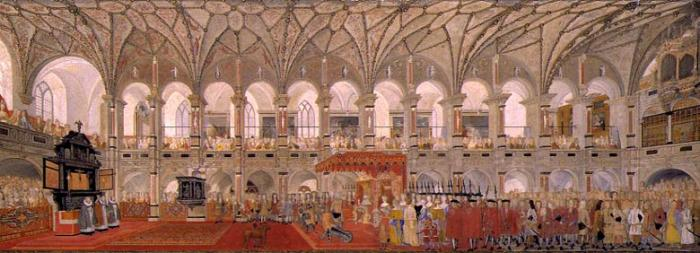
Anointing of Frederick IV in the Chapel of Frederiksborg Palace by Bendix Grodtschilling the Youngest.

== Reign ==
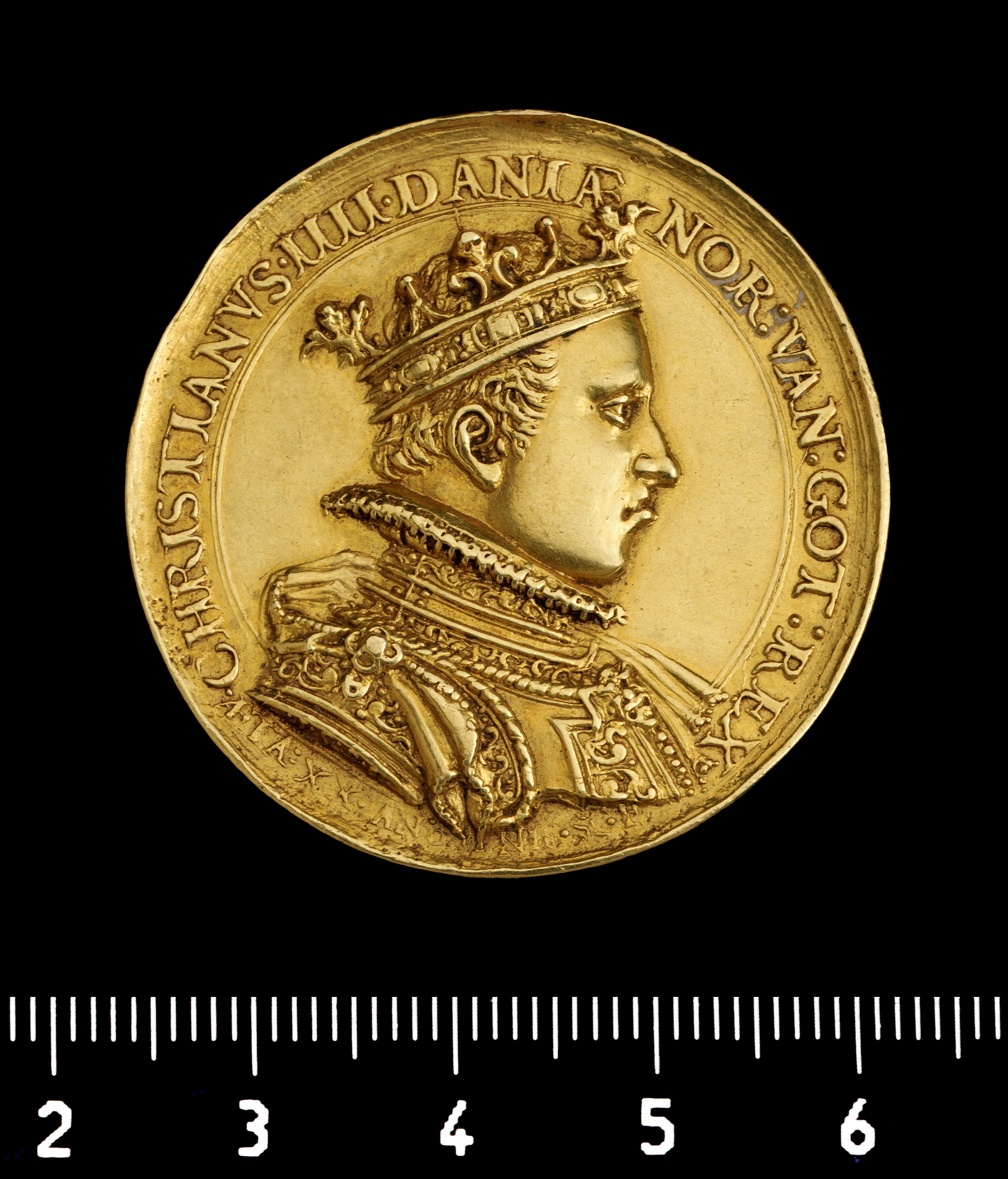
Frederick IV's coronation medal

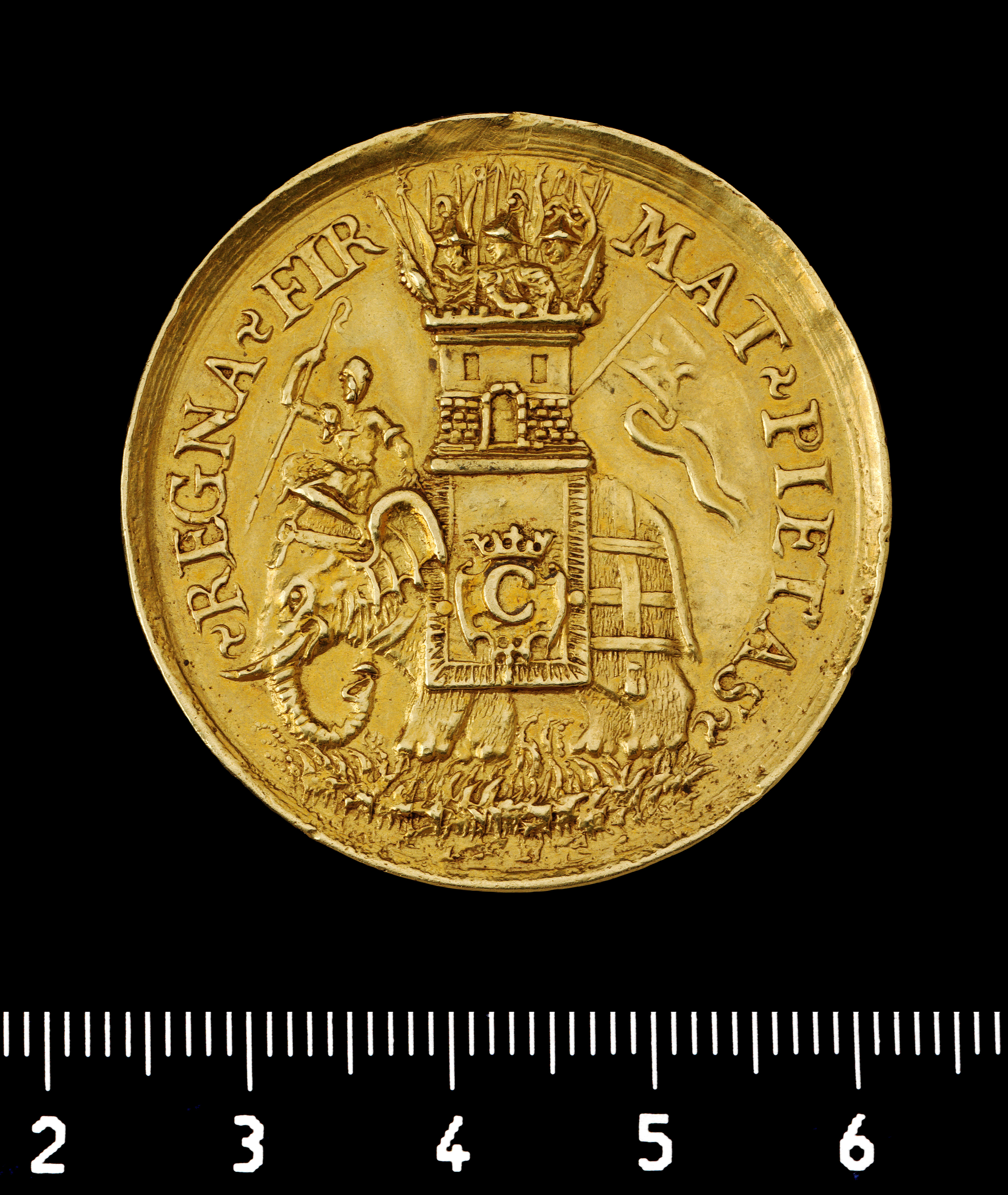
Frederick IV's coronation medal, reverse.

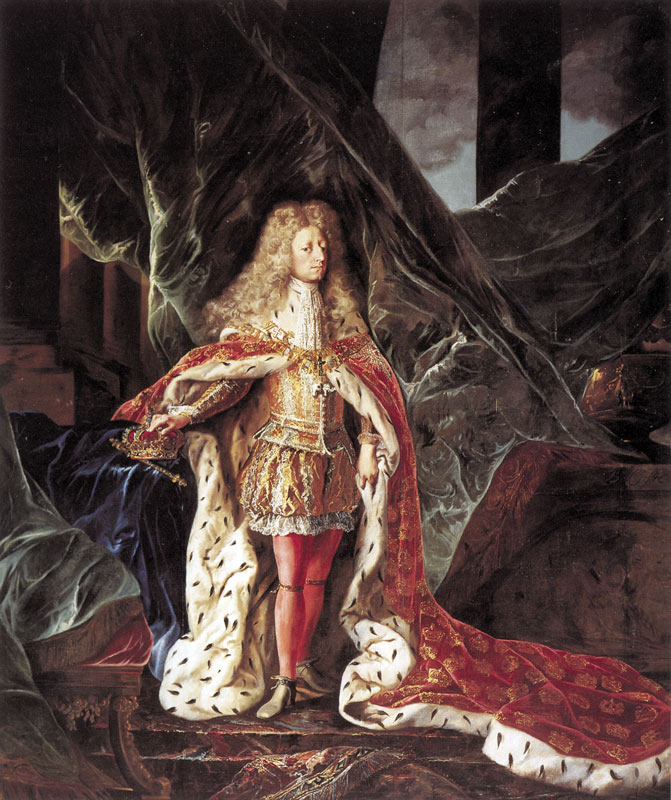
Coronation portrait of Frederick IV by Benoît Le Coffre, c. 1700s

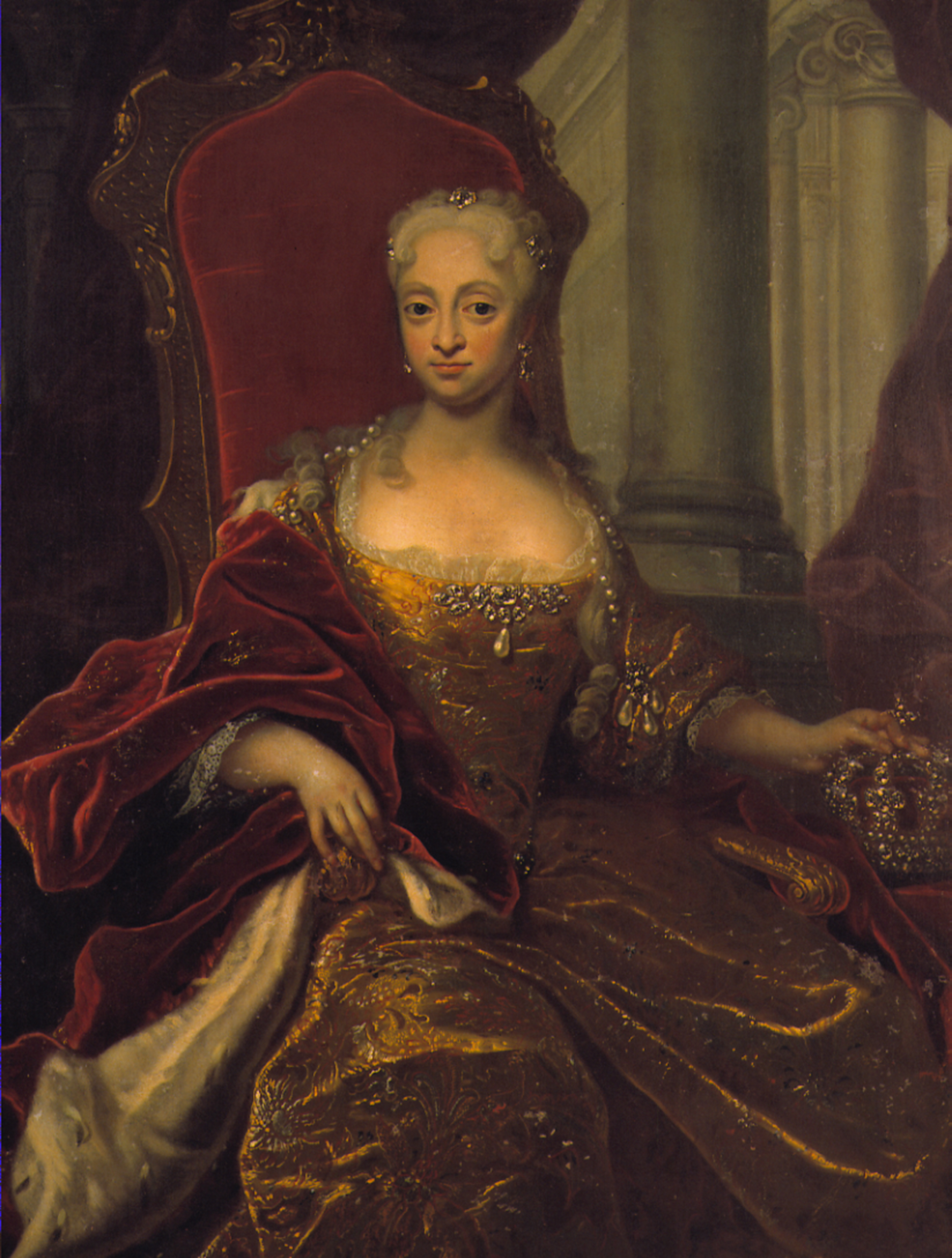
Frederick's first wife Louise of Mecklenburg-Güstrow

=== Domestic rule ===
Frederick's most important domestic reform was the abolition in 1702 of the so-called vornedskab, a kind of serfdom which had applied to the peasants of Zealand since the Late Middle Ages. His efforts were largely in vain because of the introduction in 1733 of adscription (stavnsbånd), a law that forced peasants to remain in their home regions, by which the peasantry were subjected to both the local nobility and the army.

After the Great Northern War, trade and culture flowered. The first Danish theatre, Lille Grønnegade Theatre, was created and the great dramatist Ludvig Holberg (1684–1754) began his career. He established the College of Missions which funded the missionary Hans Egede (1686–1758) in taking forward the colonisation of Greenland. Politically this period was marked by the King's connection to the Reventlows, the Holsteiner relatives of his second queen, and by his growing suspicion of the old nobility.

During Frederick's rule Copenhagen was struck by two disasters: the plague of 1711, and the great fire of October 1728, which destroyed most of the medieval capital. The King had been persuaded by astronomer Ole Rømer (1644–1710) to introduce the Gregorian calendar in Denmark–Norway in 1700, but the astronomer's observations and calculations were among the treasures lost to the fire.

Frederik IV, having twice visited Italy, had two pleasure palaces built in the Italian baroque style: Frederiksberg Palace was extended during his reign, when it was converted into a three-storey H-shaped building, completed in 1709 by Johan Conrad Ernst, giving the palace a true Italian baroque appearance and Fredensborg Palace, both considered monuments to the conclusion of the Great Northern War.

=== Venetian journey ===
Frederick IV holds a memorable place in the social history of the city of Venice due to a remarkable visit he made during the winter of 1708–09. The King stayed in the city with an entourage of at least 80 people, formally incognito under the title "Count of Oldenburg." This disguise was not meant to conceal his identity, but rather to avoid the cumbersome and costly etiquette required for a royal visit.

During his nine-week stay, Frederick IV became a familiar figure in Venice. He was a frequent guest at operas and comedies, indulging in the city's vibrant cultural scene. The King was also a generous buyer of Venetian glass, which was highly prized at the time. His visit to the state arsenal of Venice was marked by a prestigious gift from the republic: two large bronze cannons and a bronze mortar.

One of the highlights of his stay was a grand regatta on the Grand Canal held in his honour, which was immortalized in a painting by Luca Carlevarijs. In the painting, Frederick IV is depicted in a gondola with eight rowers, accompanied by a cavalier, enjoying the spectacle. This event is celebrated as a key moment in the King's visit.

The winter of 1708–09 was unusually cold, so much so that the lagoon surrounding Venice froze over. Venetians were able to walk from the city to the mainland, and it became a popular joke that the King of Denmark had brought the cold weather with him.

Frederick IV's time in Italy was not confined to Venice. He also made a visit to the dowager grand-princess Violante Beatrice at the grand-ducal court of the Medici family in Florence, further cementing his ties with the European nobility.

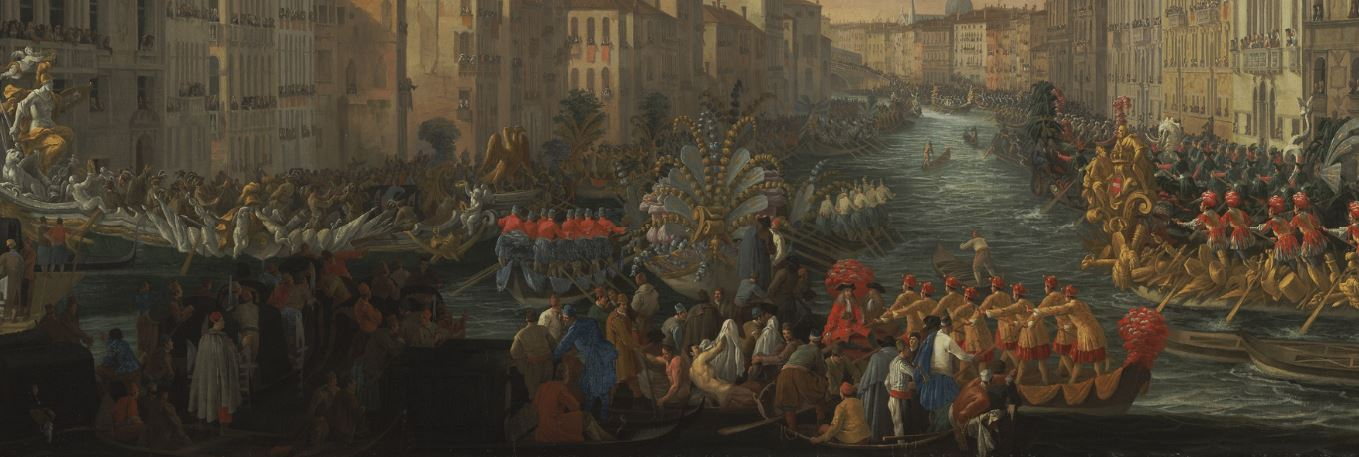
Regatta on the Grand Canal in honour of Frederick IV, King of Denmark, painted by Luca Carlevarijs.

Upon his return journey, Frederick IV conducted political negotiations with Augustus the Strong, Elector of Saxony and King of Poland, as well as with Frederick I of Prussia, regarding the impending war against Sweden. His visit to Venice thus not only contributed to his cultural experience but also had significant political implications. Much of the King's life was spent in strife with kinsmen. Two of his first cousins, Charles XII of Sweden and Frederick IV, Duke of Holstein-Gottorp (the three men were the grandsons of Frederick III of Denmark), had waged war upon his father jointly. Initially defeated by the Swedes and forced to recognise the independence of Holstein-Gottorp, Frederick finally drove the next duke of Holstein-Gottorp, Duke Charles Frederick (who was Frederick IV's first cousin once removed) out of Schleswig in 1713, and avoided the revenge contemplated by Charles Frederick's mother-in-law, Catherine I of Russia.

=== Personal life ===
Frederick was deemed a man of responsibility and industry — often regarded as the most intelligent of Denmark–Norway's absolute monarchs. He seems to have mastered the art of remaining independent of his ministers. Lacking all interest in academic knowledge, he was nevertheless a patron of culture, especially art and architecture. His main weaknesses were probably pleasure-seeking and womanising, which sometimes distracted him. He was the penultimate Danish king to make a morganatic marriage (the last was Frederick VII with Louise Rasmussen aka "Countess Danner").

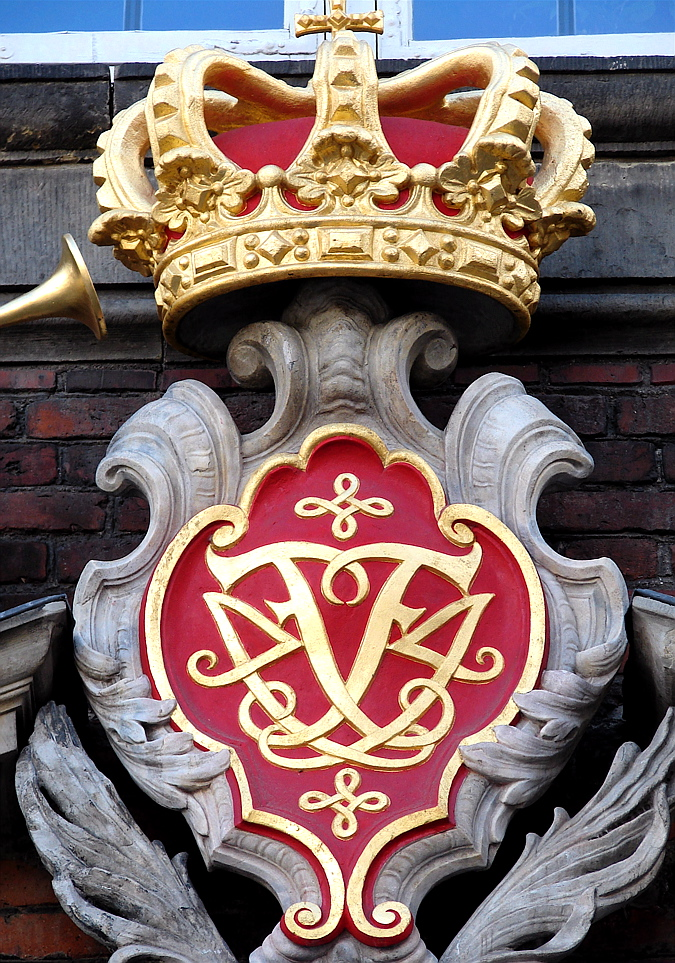
The monogram of Frederick IV on the Danish Parliament building

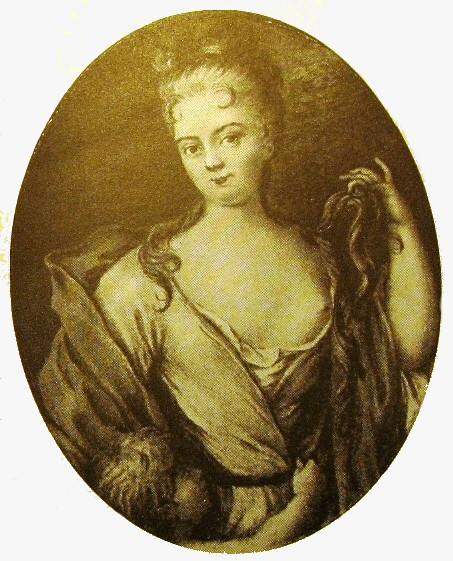
Elisabeth Helene von Vieregg

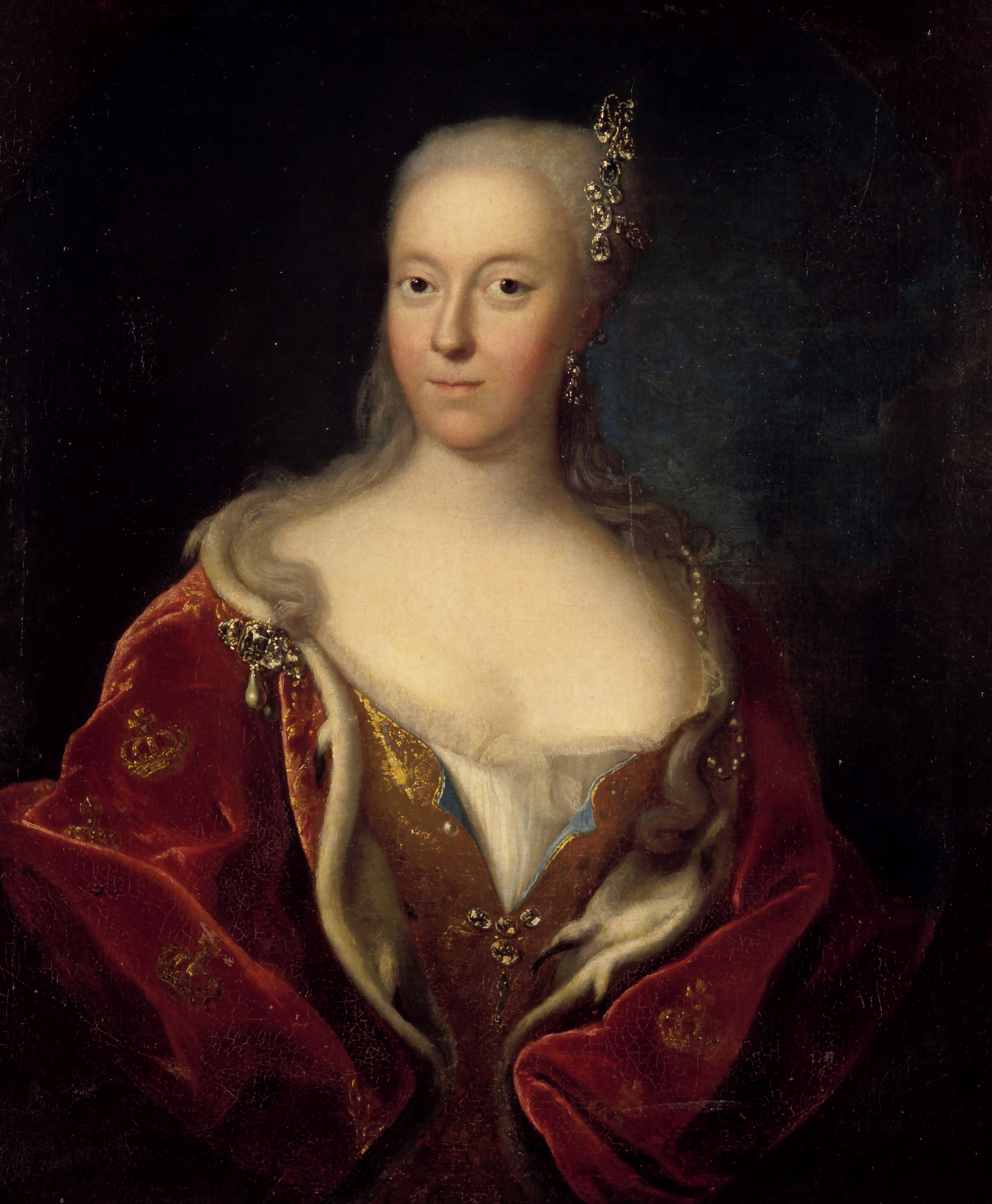
Anne Sophie Reventlow

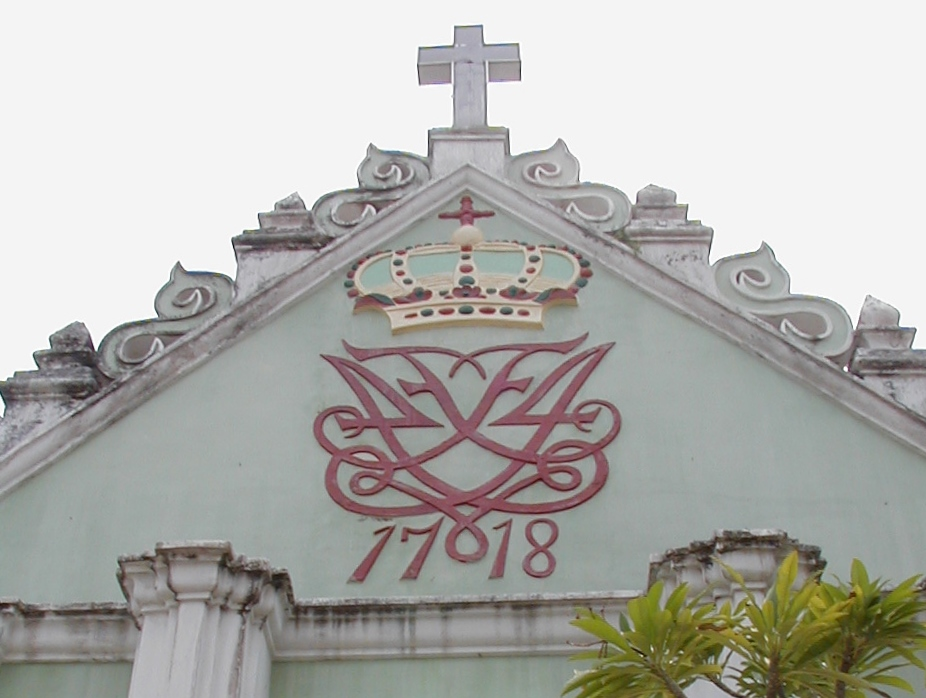
Royal Monogram of Frederick IV of Denmark, New Jerusalem Church, Tranquebar, India

Without divorcing Queen Louise, in 1703 he married Elisabeth Helene von Vieregg (d.1704). After the death of Elisabeth, he entered into a romance with her lady-in-waiting Charlotte Helene von Schindel, though he later lost interest in her. In 1711, Frederick fell in love with 19-year-old Countess Anne Sophie Reventlow, daughter of the then Grand-Chancellor Conrad von Reventlow. He carried her off from her home, Clausholm Castle near Randers, after her mother refused to let her daughter be a royal mistress. Frederick had seen Anne Sophie at a masquerade ball at Koldinghus, where the royal family resided during the plague that devastated Copenhagen. A secret marriage was held at Skanderborg on 26 June 1712. At that time he accorded her the title "Duchess of Schleswig" (derived from one of his own subsidiary titles). Three weeks after Queen Louise's death in Copenhagen on 4 April 1721, he legalised his relationship with Anna Sophie by a new marriage, this time declaring her queen consort (the first wife of a hereditary Danish king to bear that title who was not of royal blood by birth). It was undoubtedly a relief to regularise a relationship they both saw as sinful. Of the nine children born to him of these three wives, only two of them survived to adulthood: the future Christian VI and Princess Charlotte-Amalia, both from the first marriage. All the other children died in infancy.

The Reventlows took advantage of their kinship to the King. Anna's sister, the salonist Countess Christine Sophie Holstein of Holsteinborg, was nicknamed Madame Chancellor because of her influence. Within a year of making Anna Queen, Frederick also recognized as dynastic the issue of the morganatic marriages of two of her kinsmen, Duke Philip Ernest of Schleswig-Holstein-Glucksburg (1673–1729) and Duke Christian Charles of Schleswig-Holstein-Plön-Norburg (1674–1706), to non-royal nobles. The other Schleswig-Holstein dukes of the House of Oldenburg perceived their interests to be injured, and Frederick found himself embroiled in complicated lawsuits and petitions to the Holy Roman Emperor. Also offended by the Countess's elevation were Frederick's younger unmarried siblings, Princess Sophia Hedwig (1677–1735) and Prince Charles (1680–1729), who withdrew from Copenhagen to their own rival court at the handsomely re-modelled Vemmetofte Cloister (later a haven for dowerless damsels of the nobility).

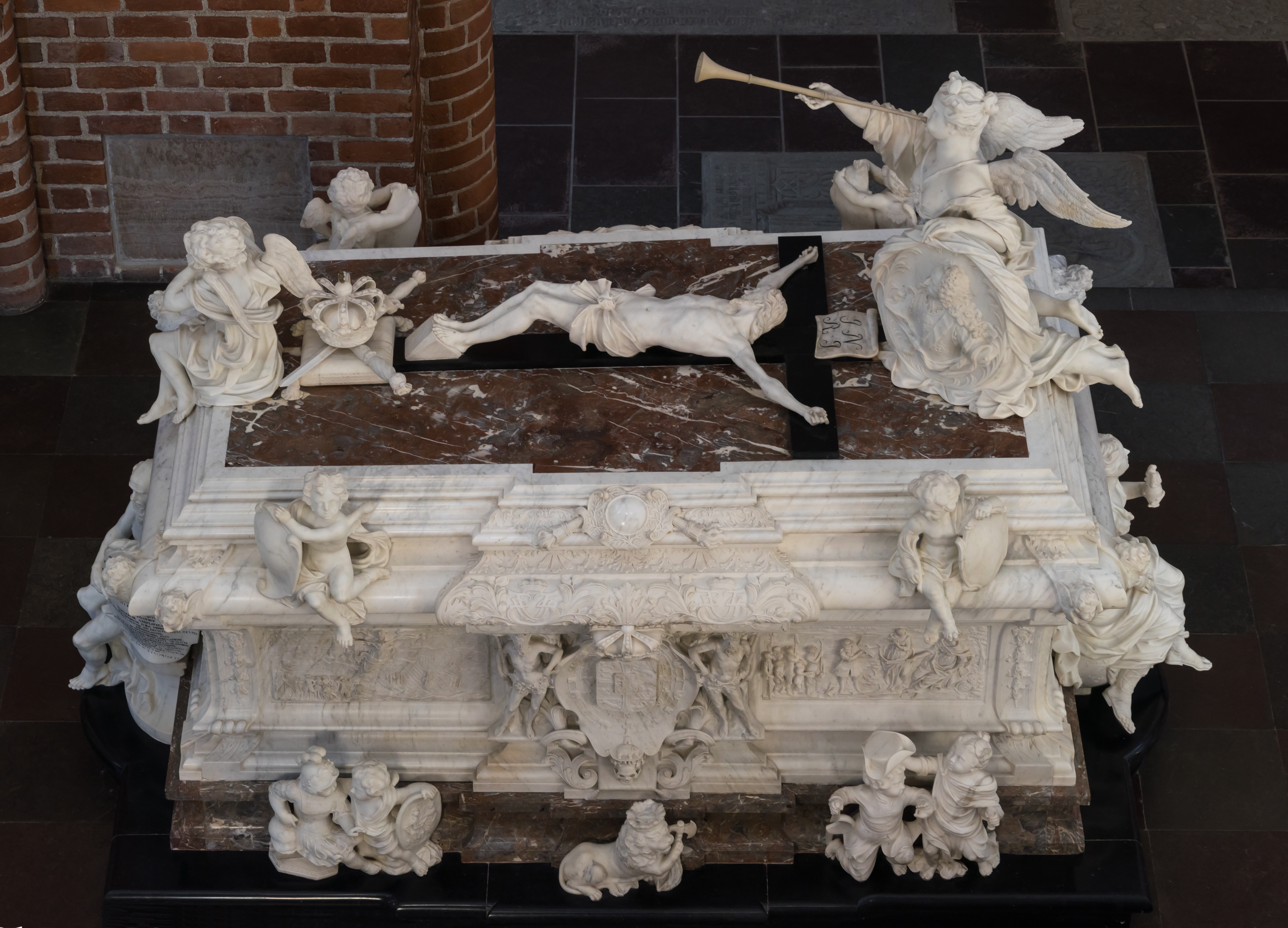
Frederik IV's sarcophagus at Roskilde Cathedral

=== Later life ===
During the King's last years he had dropsy (oedema), and was also affected by the consequences of an accident in an explosion in a cannon foundry in Copenhagen. He also had private sorrows that inclined him toward Pietism, a form of faith that would rise to prevalence during the reign of his son. During his last years, Frederick IV asked for the loyalty of his son in order to protect Queen Anna Sophie. Despite the growing weakness, he set in 1730 on a muster travel; he reached Gottorp but had to return, and died in Odense, on the day after his 59th birthday. He was buried in Roskilde Cathedral, the site of the mausoleum of Danish royalty.

== Issue ==
With his first queen, Duchess Louise of Mecklenburg-Güstrow:

- Prince Christian (28 June 1697 - 1 October 1698) died in infancy
- King Christian VI of Denmark (10 December 1699 - 6 August 1746)
- Prince Frederik Charles (23 October 1701 - 7 January 1702) died in infancy
- Prince George (6 January 1703 – 12 March 1704) died in infancy
- Princess Charlotte Amalie (6 October 1706 – 28 October 1782)

With his second wife Elisabeth Helene von Vieregg:

- Frederik Gyldenløve (1704–1705)

With his third wife and second queen, Countess Anne Sophie von Reventlow:

- Princess Christiana Amalia (23 October 1723 - 7 January 1724) died in infancy
- Prince Frederik Christian (1 June 1726 - 15 May 1727) died in infancy
- Prince Charles (16 February 1728 - 10 December 1729) died in infancy

== Ancestry ==
Ancestors of Frederick IV of Denmark

8. Christian IV of Denmark
4. Frederick III of Denmark
9. Anne Catherine of Brandenburg
2. Christian V of Denmark
10. George, Duke of Brunswick-Lüneburg
5. Sophie Amalie of Brunswick-Lüneburg
11. Landgravine Anne Eleonore of Hesse-Darmstadt
1. Frederick IV of Denmark
12. William V, Landgrave of Hesse-Kassel
6. William VI, Landgrave of Hesse-Kassel
13. Countess Amalie Elisabeth of Hanau-Münzenberg
3. Charlotte Amalie of Hesse-Kassel
14. George William, Elector of Brandenburg
7. Margravine Hedwig Sophie of Brandenburg
15. Countess Palatine Elizabeth Charlotte of Simmern

Frederick IV House of Oldenburg Born: 11 October 1671 Died: 12 October 1730
Regnal titles
Preceded by Christian V	King of Denmark and Norway; Count of Oldenburg; 1699–1730	Succeeded by Christian VI
Preceded by Christian V and Frederick IV	Duke of Schleswig; 1699–1730 with Frederick IV (1699–1702); Charles Frederick (1702–1713)	Succeeded by Christian VI
Preceded by Christian V and Frederick IV	Duke of Holstein; 1699–1730 with Frederick IV (1699–1702); Charles Frederick (1702–1730)	Succeeded by Christian VI and Charles Frederick
