= Christine Sophie Holstein =

Danish salon hostess (1672–1757)

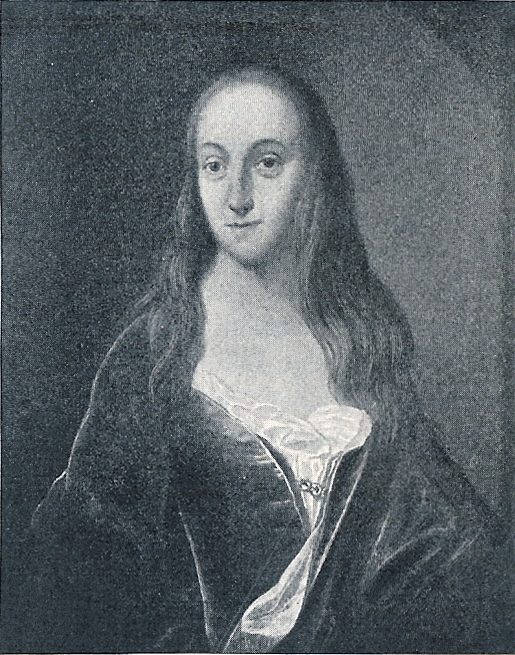
Christine Sophie Holstein

Countess Christine Sophie Holstein of Holsteinborg, née Reventlow (30 October 1672 – 27 June 1757) was a politically influential Danish salon hostess.

== Biography ==
Daughter to Count Conrad von Reventlow (1644–1708), Danish Grand Chancellor (prime minister), and Anna Margrethe Gabel (1651–1678), she married Count Niels Friis (1665–1699) in 1688 and statesman Count Ulrik Adolph von Holstein of Holsteinborg in 1700, and belonged to the highest aristocracy in Denmark. In 1707, she was granted Seekamp estate (a part of today's Kiel-Schilksee) in then Slesvig as her own fief by her father.

From 1712, the king had a relationship with her half-sister, Anna Sophie Reventlow, and in 1721, he made her queen. Holstein had a large influence over her sister and her royal brother-in-law: she was called "madame la grande chancellière" (Madame Grand Chancellor), and her views were presented through her sister to the king and to the government, thereby making her an important politician in the 1710s and 1720s. She held a salon in her palace in Copenhagen, and it was well known by foreign ambassadors that she was one of the most powerful people during the reign of Frederick IV of Denmark.

In 1730, Fredrick IV died and his son banned Anne Sophie Reventlow from court and fired Holstein's husband. Holstein lost all power and spent the rest of her life with her family.

== See also ==
- Charlotte Schimmelmann
- Sophia Magdalena Krag Juel Vind
