= Von Hahn =

German noble family

Hahn Hane, Hanen
- Noble family
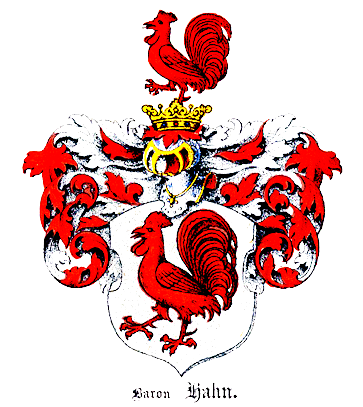
- Country: Germany: Mecklenburg
- Founded: 1230; 796 years ago
- Titles: Baron
- Members: Heinrich von Hahn; Georg von Hahn; Philipp Heinrich; Theodor von Hahn; Johann August von Hahn; Alexander von Hahn (1970)
- Motto: Primus sum, qui deum laudat (I was the first to praise God)
- Estates: Mecklenburg; Neuhaus in Holstein; Wetterau in Hesse; Postenden, Latvia
- Cadet branches: Baltic states

The House of Hahn (originally Hane and Hanen) was an ancient German-Baltic noble family which was prominent in the Duchy of Courland and Semigallia and on the Baltic Island Ösel. It was founded in 1230 and existed until 1951. It was also part of the old Mecklenburg noble family, first mentioned on October 30, 1230. The Mecklenburg clan branched out at the turn of the 14th century into a Mecklenburg and a Courland clan.

Later, the family carried the title Baron or Baron (Baroness, Baroness, Freifrau, Freiin), which was the highest title, which the family ever held. Ludolf Hahn (around 1300) is mentioned as the ancestor of the Baltic lines, whose descendants later established their residence with Heinrich von Hahn (around 1518) in Postenden near Talsen. Johann August von Hahn (around 1725–1799) descended from the Saaremaa von Hahns. Both family lines carried the same coat of arms.

== Origins ==
The origin of the name and the family is not clear. The first Hahn, with whom this coat of arms is associated, is mentioned in the historical annals as Eckhard I, or "Eggehardus Gallus" in Latin original. In 1230 he was referred to as a councilor and a knight of Duke Johann I of Mecklenburg. Not much is known about his ancestors, though the family legend points to Franconia as a place of family origin. Regarded by some researchers as highly improbable on mainly geographical grounds, this theory may warrant further consideration due to close connections between the Obotrit's house of Mecklenburg and that of Franconian Hennebergs. The marriage in 1229 (a year before Eckhard Hane appears in chronicles) between Johann and Luitgart von Henneberg, daughter of Poppo VII. von Henneberg supports this theory as it establishes a direct link between these two families.

There is a similarity between the Hahn's coat of arms, the old Franconian families of Rothenhahn and Hahnsberg, further reinforced by the 'historical' form of the name of the Öesel's Hahn family: "Hahn genannt Rothenstern". Another similarity exists between Hahn's coat of arms and that of the de Vogüé family of Aubenas, France.

Finally, there is also a proximity between the name and the coat of arms of the Hennebergs (literally "Rooster's mountain) and the Hahns, the rooster being its main point of reference.

The origin of the Baltic Hahn families is largely unclear. Presumed, though unproven, the connection between the Hahn family in Mecklenburg and the families in Courland and Öesel is a conventional explanation of their coat of arms being identical to one another and virtually identical to that of the descendants of Eckhard Hahn.

The Ösel's Hahn family was accepted into the Nobility Corporation in 1849 with the arms of the Courland Hahns. In Russia, this part of the family was also incorporated into Russian Nobility with the coat of arms, granted by Catherine II.

Von Hahns have distinguished themselves through their service to the sovereigns of the Russian, Holy Roman, and German Empires, kings, and queens of Denmark, Sweden, and Poland.

Mecklenburg: Notable members:

- Ida, Countess von Hahn-Hahn – novelist

Courland: The history of the Baltic Hahns begins with Johann Hane referred to in 1318 as a vassal of the Danish king Erik. It is thought that Johann is a direct descendant of Eckhard Hane through his son Heinrich.

In 1318 AD king Erik of Denmark granted lands to Johann Hane "for knightly and praiseworthy deeds." Johann's brother, Reimar Hane, was Master of the Teutonic Order (in Livonia) from 1324 to 1328. In 1476 Berndt von der Borch, Master of the Order granted Heinrich Hahn the Postenden estate, which remained in the same hands until 1939 - the longest uninterrupted land ownership in Courland. 1862 Ukaz of the Russian Imperial Senate allowed the family to use the title "Baron" officially.

== Members ==
- Reimar Hane — Master of the German Order (1324–1328)
- Paul Theodor von Hahn (1793–1862) — Privy Councilor, civil governor of Courland (1824–1827), and of Livland (1827–1829), Senator and Imperial State Council member, honorary member of the Russian Academy of Sciences.

Ösel: descendants of Johann August von Hahn. Family incorporated into the Ösel's Nobility Corporation in 1849.

- Johann August von Hahn (c. 1730 – 1799) — Privy Councillor to the Empress Catherine II, General-director of the St. Petersburg Post Department and Imperial Postmaster
- Friedrich August von Hahn (1761–1851) — Actual State Councilor, St. Petersburg post Director

Russian Empire: cadet branch of the Ösel family; descendants of Otto Karl v H, younger brother of Friedrich August v H (and son of Johann August von Hahn). Recorded at the Nobility Genealogical Book of Saint Petersburg Governorate. Members of the family use the title "Baron", alongside Hahn coat of arms.

- Eugen Kaspar von Hahn (1807–1874) — Senator, Privy Councilor
- Alexander von Hahn (1809–1895) — General of the Infantry, member of the Military Council of the Minister of War
- Dmitry K. von Hahn (1830–1907) — General of the Infantry, Inspector of the Border Guard Corps
- Sergey D. (1860–1914) — Actual Privy Councilor, President of the Russian Imperial Bank, Deputy Minister of Trade and Industry

== Coat of arms ==
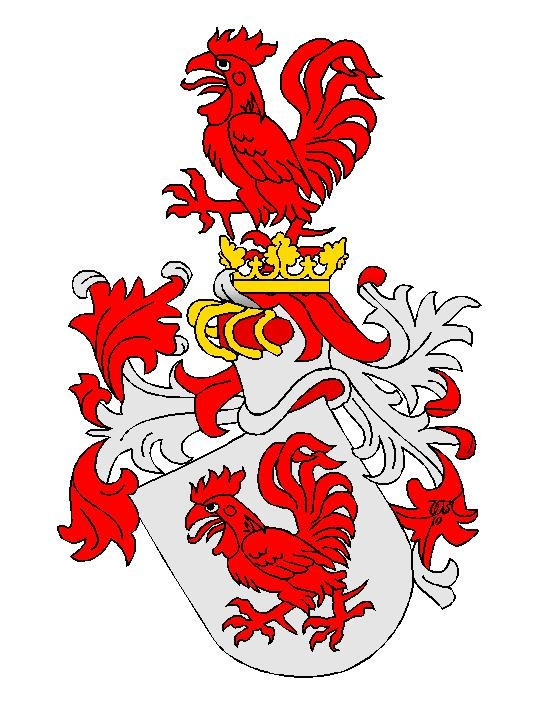
Coat of Arms of von Hahn, Kurland and Oesel

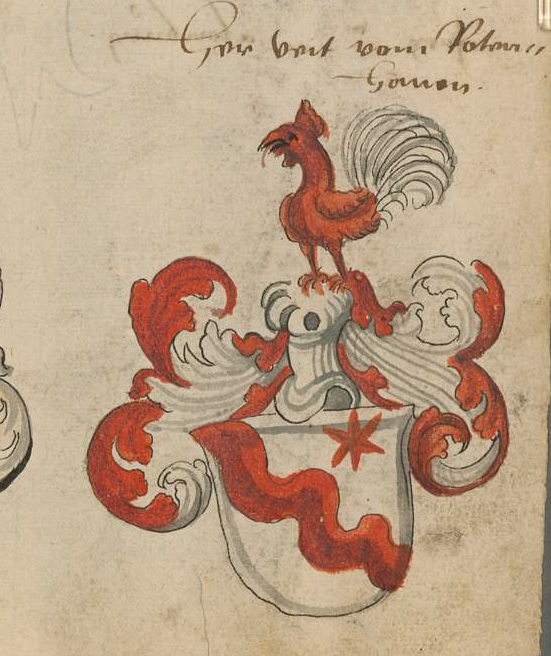
Coat of arms of the Rotenhan

Coat of Arms of de Vogüé

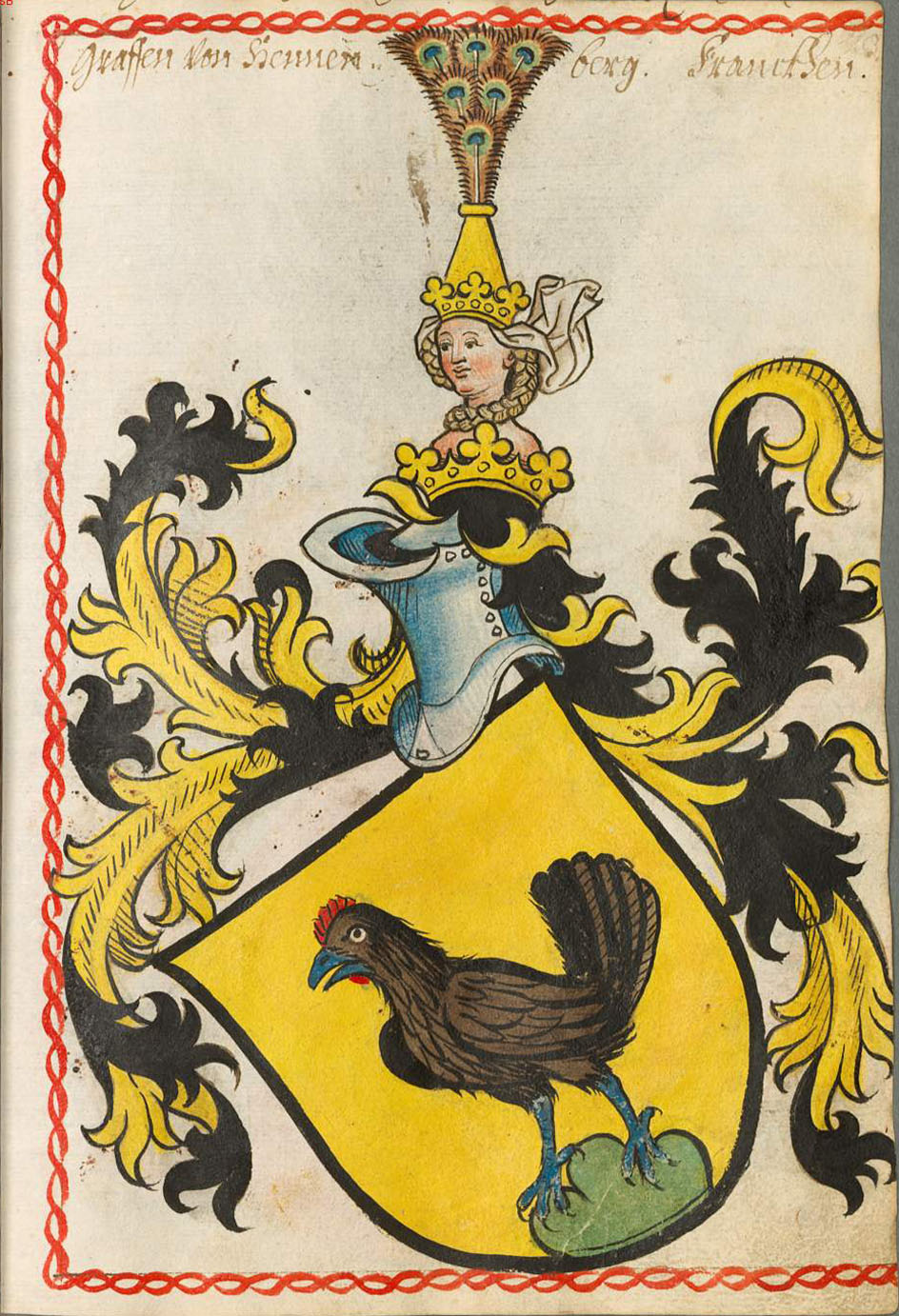
Coat of arms of Henneberg

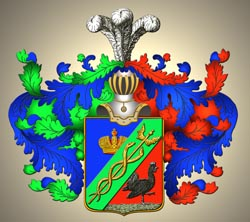
Coat of arms of Johann August von Hahn, granted by Catherine II of Russia and recorded at the Armorial of the Russian Empire

== See also ==
- Kur coat of arms
