= Reventlow =

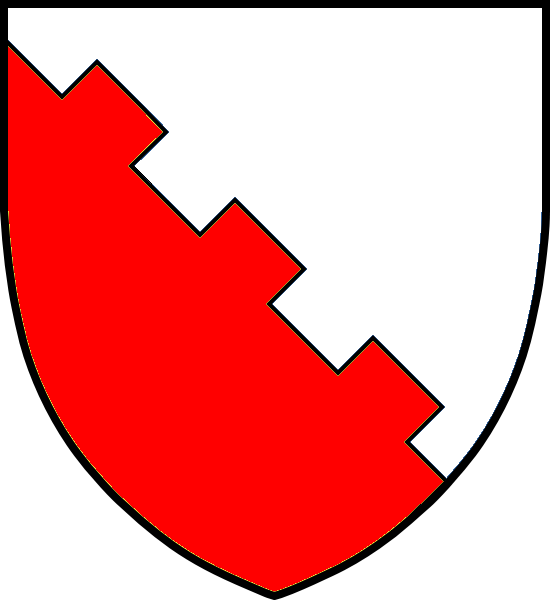
One of the Reventlow coat of arms

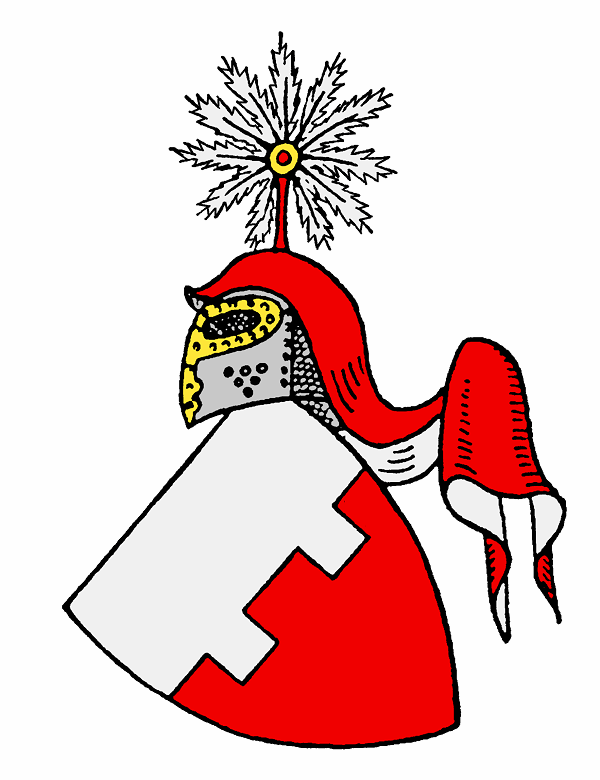
One of the Reventlow coat of arms

The Reventlow family is an ancient (Uradel) German noble family of Holstein and Mecklenburg origin, belonging to the Equites Originarii of Schleswig-Holstein, which achieved notable prominence within both the Holy Roman and German Empires while also rising to immense political influence within the Kingdom of Denmark through generations of royal service. Alternate spellings include Revetlo, Reventlo, Reventlau, Reventlou, Reventlow, Refendtlof and Reffentloff.

== History ==
In 1223, Godescalcus de Revetlo of Holstein was first mentioned in writing. He was vassal of Count Albrecht of Orlamünde and Holstein. In 1236 and 1258, Thitlevus de Revetlow was in Mecklenburg in the wake of the Prince Johann I. In both countries, members of the family were able to gain significant professional and economic positions over time.

The old Holstein line, also found from the 14th to the 16th century in Funen, ended in 1752. With the extinction of the Gallentiner branch in 1772, the Mecklenburg branch also ended. Relatives from this branch, however, had previously settled in the Duchy of Schleswig. From Ziesendorf (in Mecklenburg) came Detlef Reventlow, who was appointed chancellor of Christian IV of Denmark in 1632. He was progenitor of two new branches, both of which came to great influence.

By royal letters patent in 1767, the senior line was elevated to the Danish dignity of Lensgreve by primogeniture, one of seven extant Danish noble lines to hold the dignity by royal patent rather than by succession to a former fief.

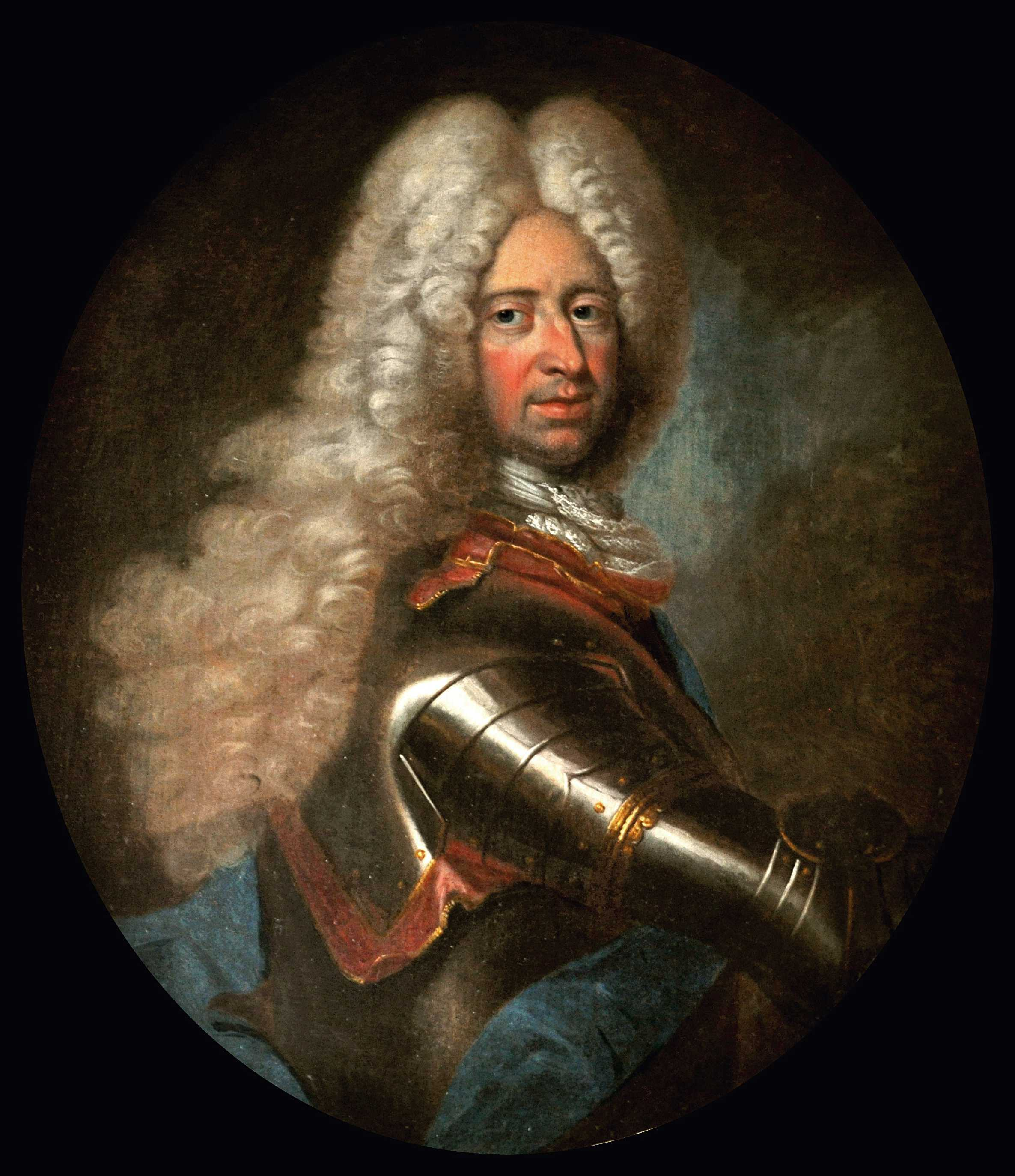
Count Conrad von Reventlow (1644–1708), Danish Prime Minister

The younger branch had acquired by 1673 the Danish Graf and on July 23, 1706, to Vienna the Count of the Holy Roman Empire. Conrad von Reventlow (1644–1708), Grand Chancellor and Prime Minister of Christian V of Denmark, received the higher feudal rank and was awarded the Liege County of Reventlou - Sandbjerg in Schleswig. His son acquired the feudal county Christianssæde on Lolland and the feudal barony Brahetrolleborg on Funen.

The younger daughter of Conrad von Reventlow, Anna Sophie von Reventlow (1693–1743), became in 1712 consort of King Frederick IV of Denmark and Duchess of Schleswig. In 1721 she was crowned Queen of Denmark. Other Reventlows were related by marriage to the Dukes of Holstein. The Reventlow family counts important personalities of the European aristocracy, including the last German empress Auguste Victoria.

Detlev von Reventlow (1712–1783), heir of the Altenhof and Glasau estates, bought Gut Emkendorf in 1764, from Detlef von Reventlow Gut Wittenberg in 1767, and the Altenhof neighboring Gut Aschau in 1782.

The Counts of Reventlow-Criminil with a Danish diploma of 1815 belonged in the male line to the French Marquis Le Merchier de Criminil. Joseph and Heinrich were the sons of a niece of Julia von Reventlow who she and her husband Friedrich Karl Reventlow adopted. Joseph inherited the Emkendorf in 1828; his descendants sold it in 1929.

Lensgreve Dr.-Ing. Christian Friedrich Klaus Hermann von Reventlow is the current head of the senior line and of the House of Reventlow as a whole.

== Possessions ==
=== Denmark ===
Estates currently owned by members of the Reventlow family in Denmark include Rudbjerggaard (since 1891) and Sæbyholm (since 1801). Former estates of the Reventlow family in Denmark include Christianssæde (1728–1934), Pederstrup (1725–2009) and Sandbjerg (1673–1930).

A lot of churches has also belonged to members of the family. These include Horslunde Church. Former town mansions of the Reventlow family in Denmark include Amaliegade 12.

=== Germany ===
In addition to the Schleswig-Holstein and Mecklenburgian possession, estates which were temporarily in the possession of the Reventlow included Good Bülk (around 1350), Gut Kaden (15th century), Gut Waterneverstorf (1592–1662), Gut Dobersdorf (in the 17th century, from 1625), Gut Altenhof (1691–1960, inherited from the family of Bethmann-Hollweg) with Wittenberg and Gut Jersbek (1840–1960), Quarnbek and Schmoel (around 1700), Hohenfelde with Kollmar (around 1700–1739), Gut Rantzau (1728–1740), Gut Emkendorf (1764–1929), Gut Kaltenhof ( 1780–1910), Gut Falkenberg (1790–1848), Gut Testorf (18th century), and Gut Farve (19th century to 1926).

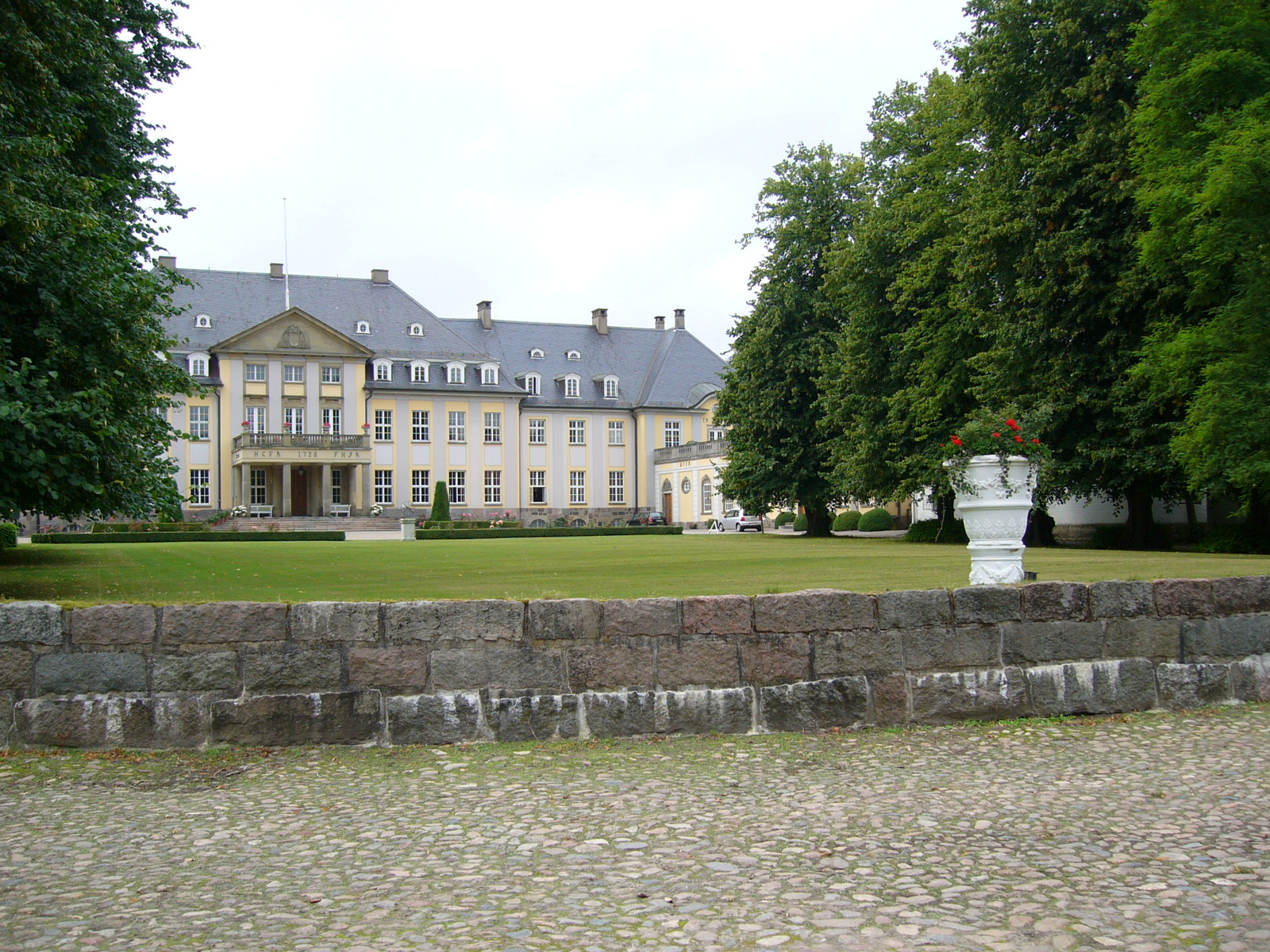
Gut Altenhof

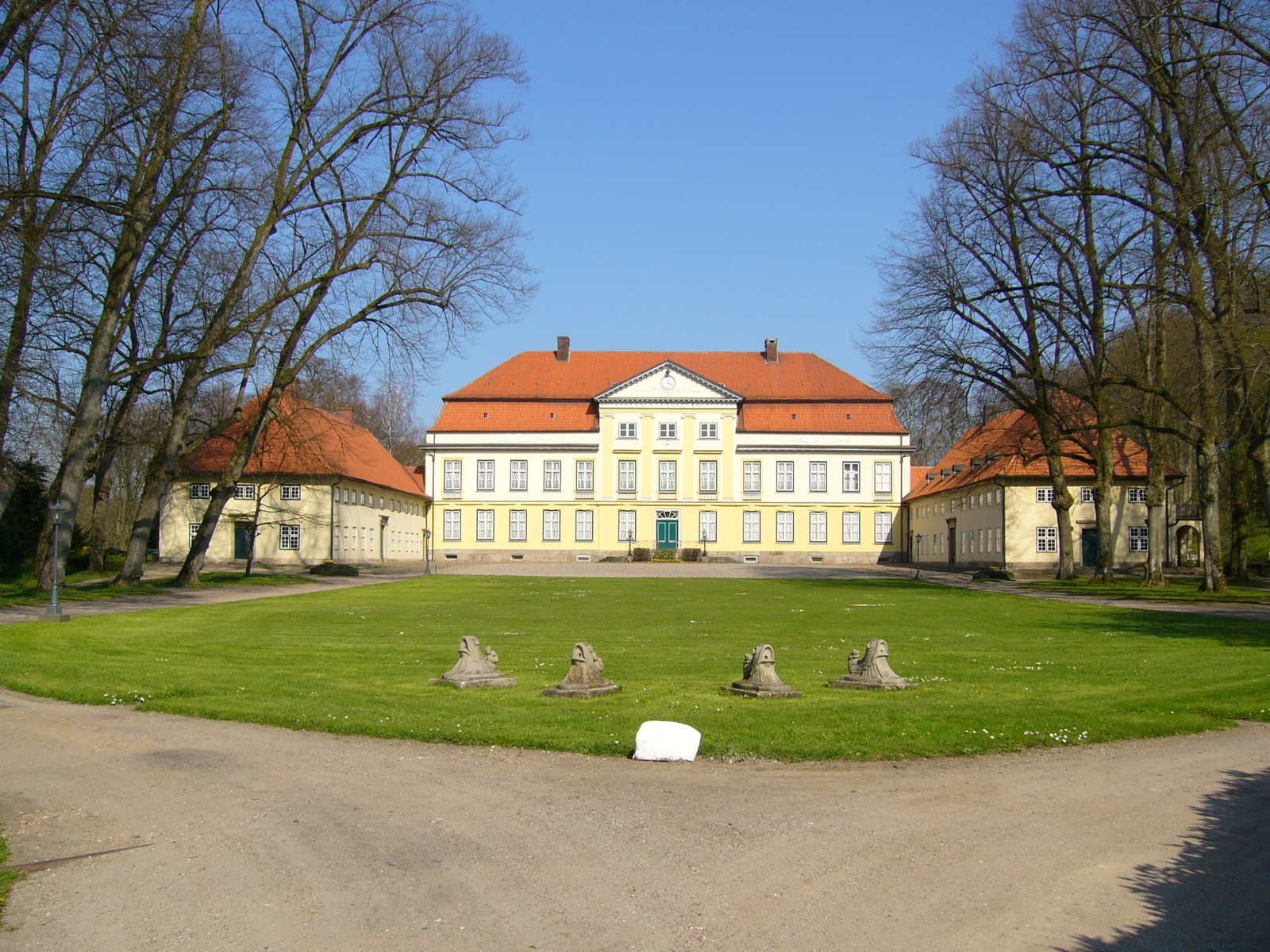
Gut Emkendorf

In Schleswig-Holstein the family is still based in Gut Damp (since the end of the 16th century), Gut Wittenberg (since 1584), Gut Wulfshagen (at Tüttendorf, since 1903) and Gut Eckhof (since 1972).

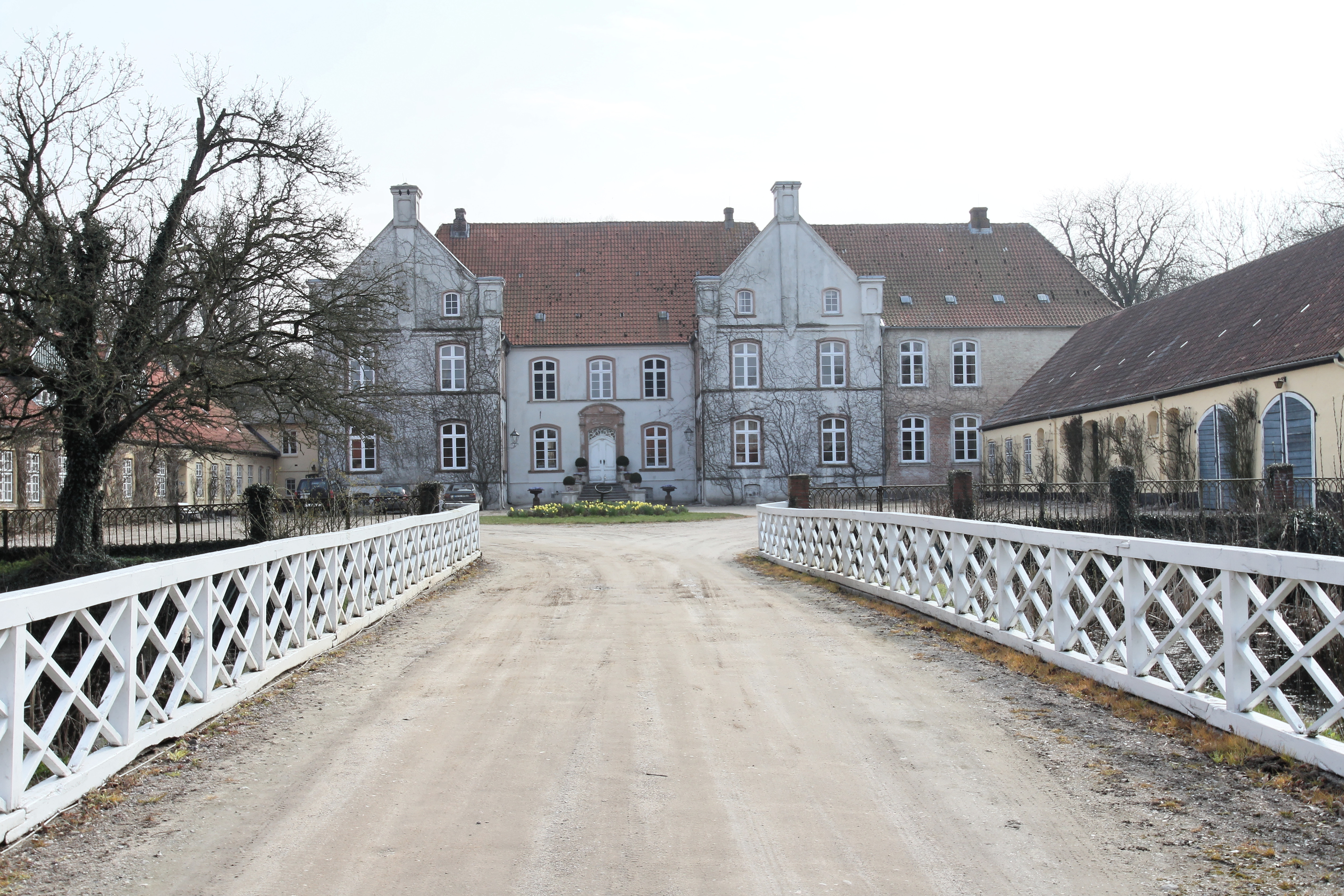
Gut Damp

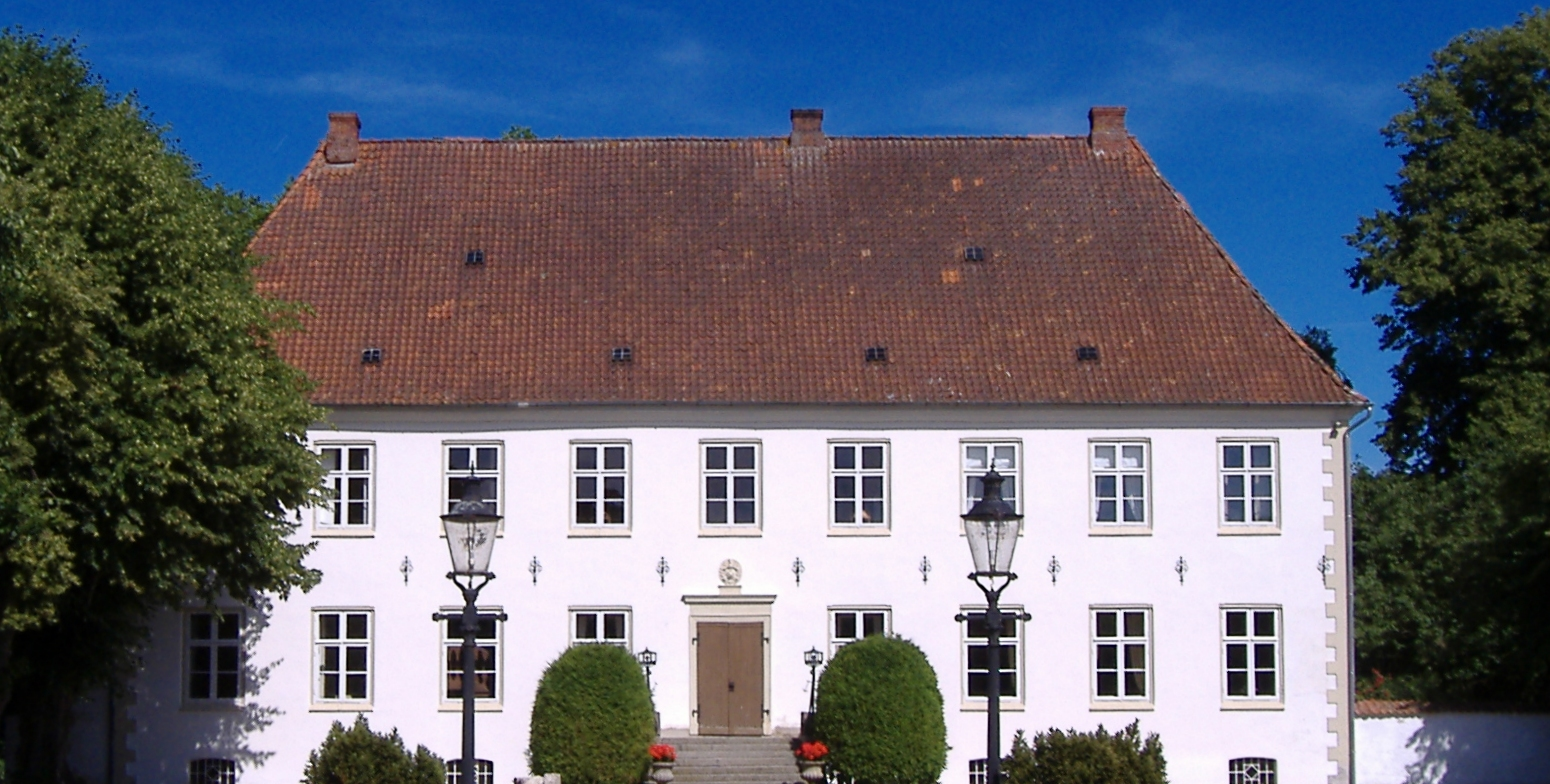
Gut Wulfshagen

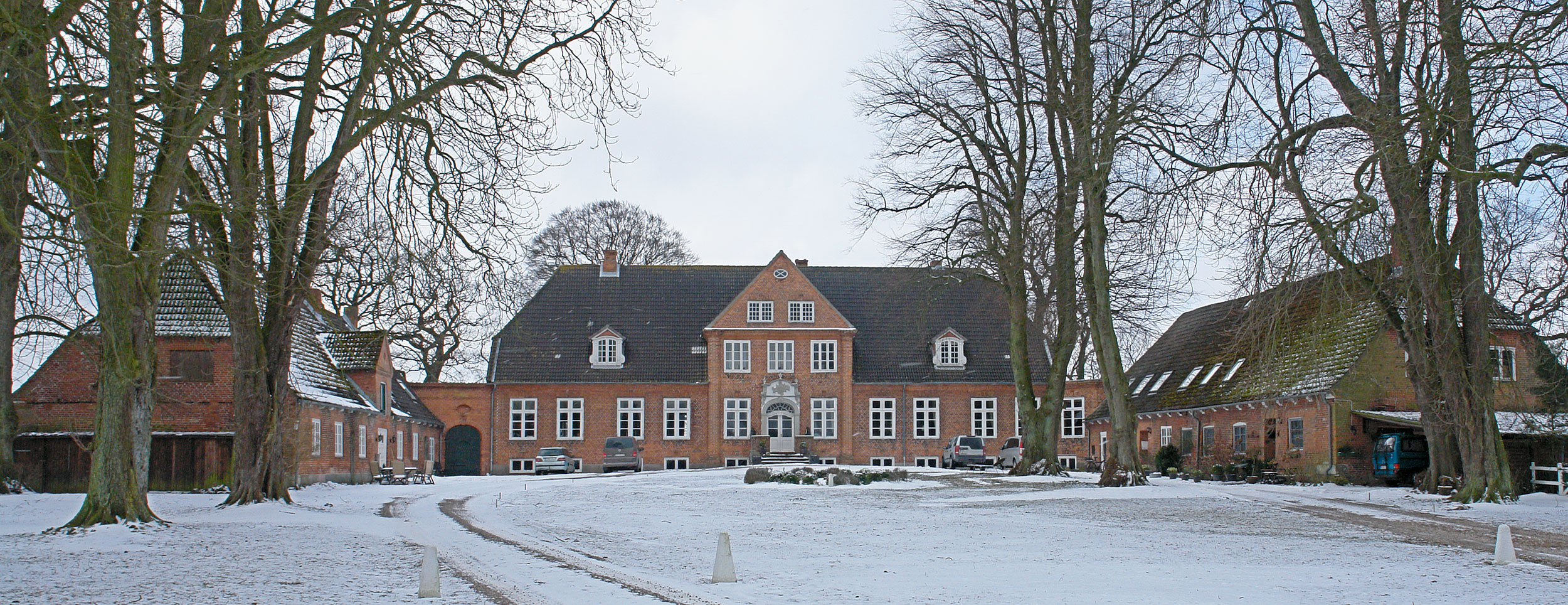
Gut Eckhof

In Denmark, Gram Castle was taken over or built by the Reventlow around 1470 and remained in the family until 1664. In 1673, Prime Minister Conrad Reventlow acquired the Sandbjerg Castle (1673–1930 owned by the family) with Gut Ballegård and built Clausholm Castle (owned 1690–1743). His son Christian Detlev of Reventlow acquired Brahetrolleborg on Funen (1722–1960), Pederstrup on Lolland (1725–1935) and Christianssæde on Laaland (1728–1934). His son Conrad Detlev Reventlow (1704–1750) married Wilhelmine Auguste, the sister of the Duke Friedrich Karl of Schleswig-Holstein-Sonderburg-Plön in 1731. In 1739 he acquired the Krenkerup Castle at Radsted Sogn with Nørregård and Rosenlund (1739–1793). In 1900, the estate Agerupgård in Våbensted Sogn came to the Counts Reventlow, who are still there.

Commoner descendants in the female line with the name Reventlow (no title of nobility) are the families Reventlow-Mourier on Brahetrolleborg and Reventlow Grinling on Krenkerup, as well as some descendants in the cognitive line in Sweden.

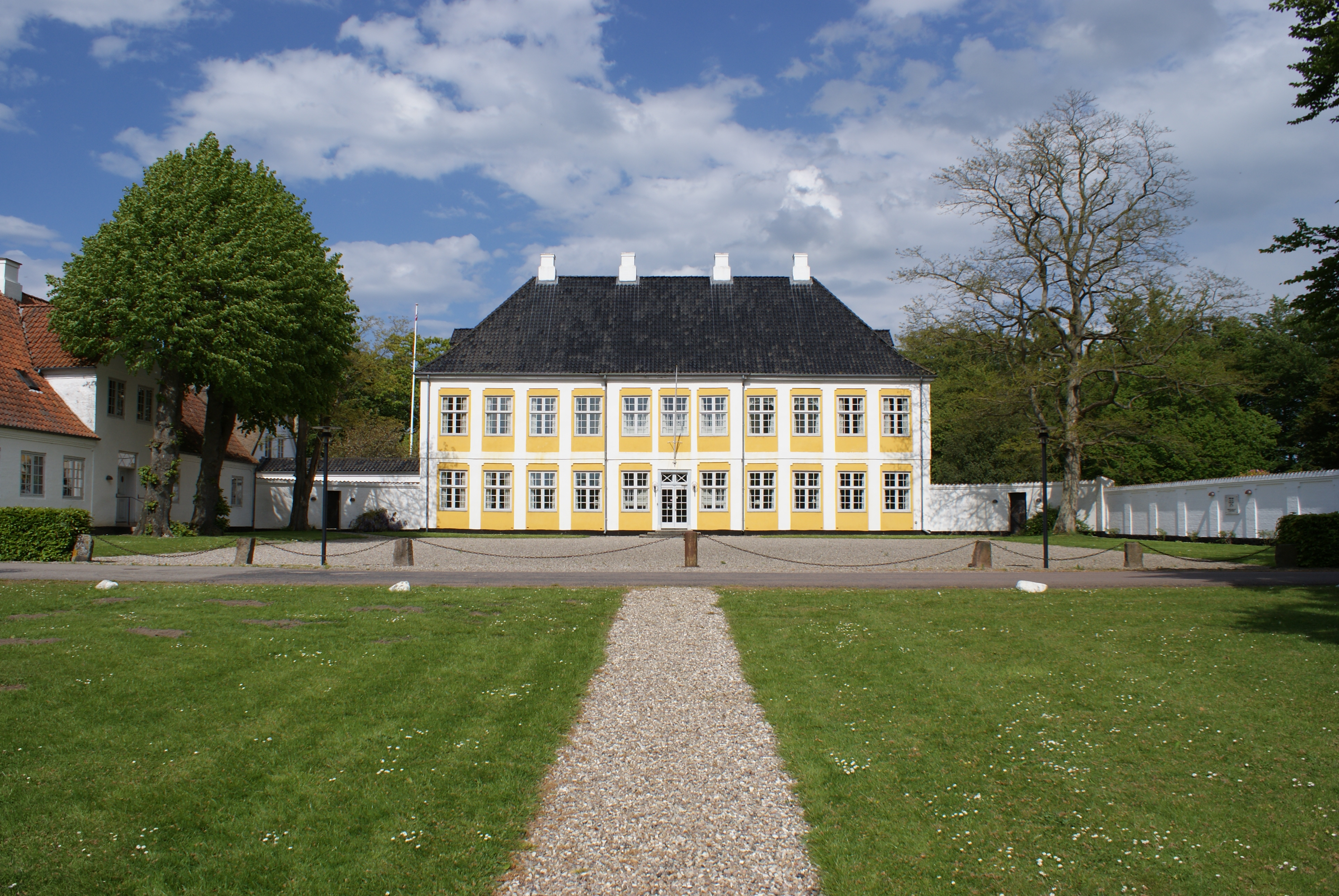
Schloss Sandbjerg

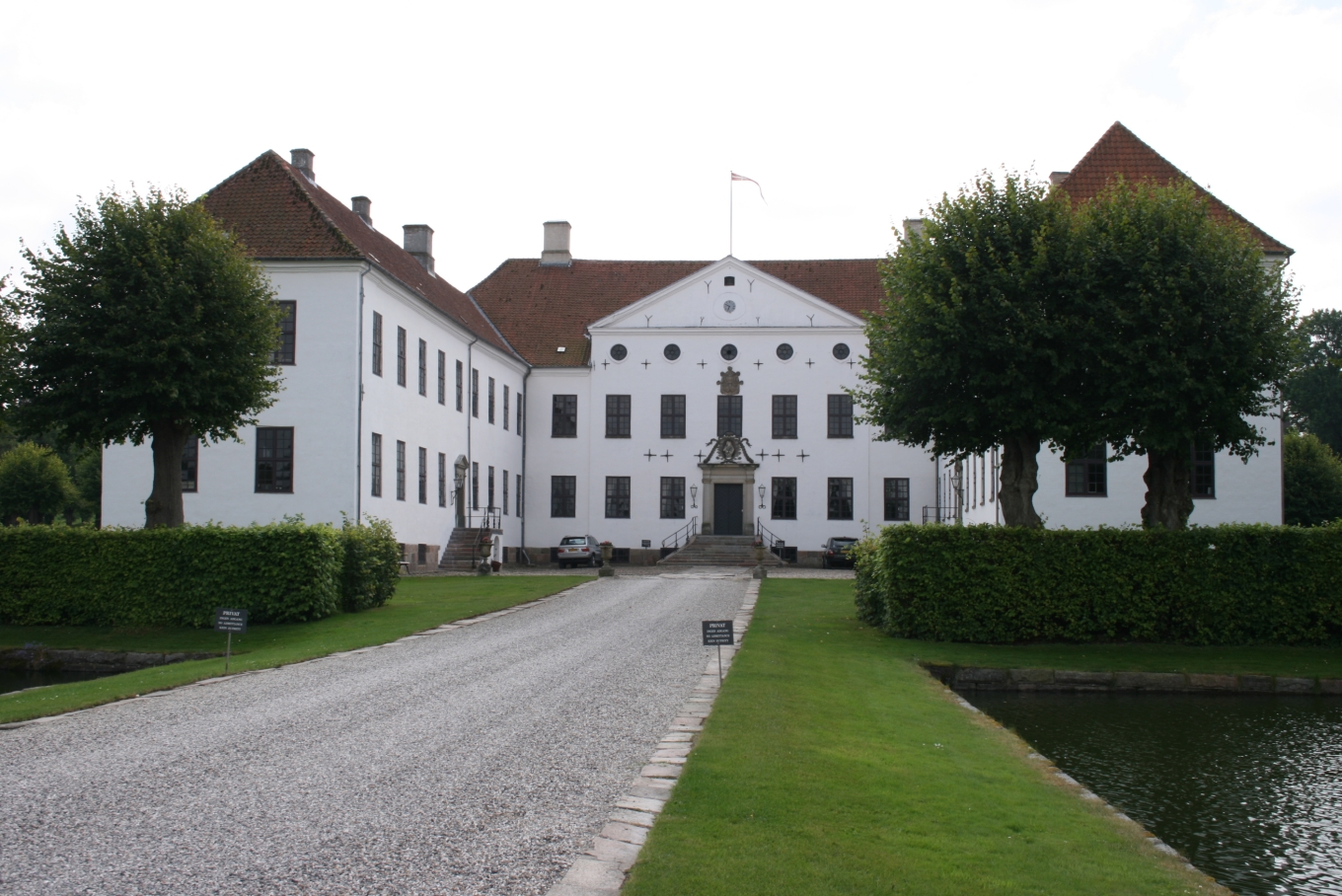
Clausholm Castle

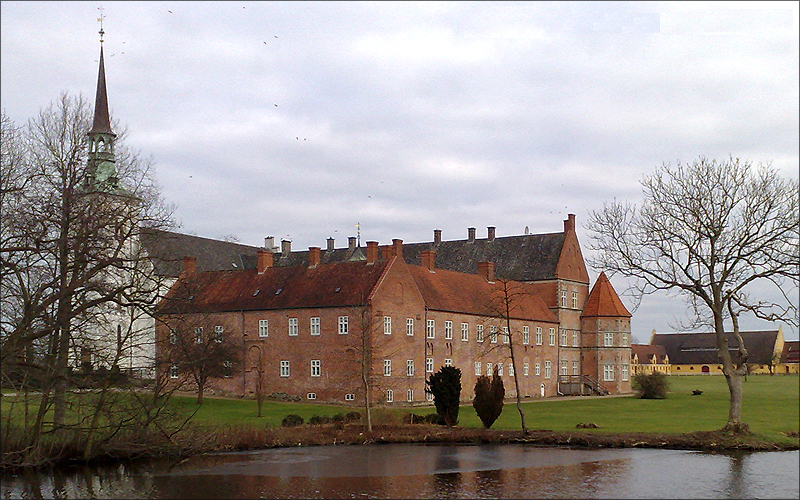
Brahetrolleborg

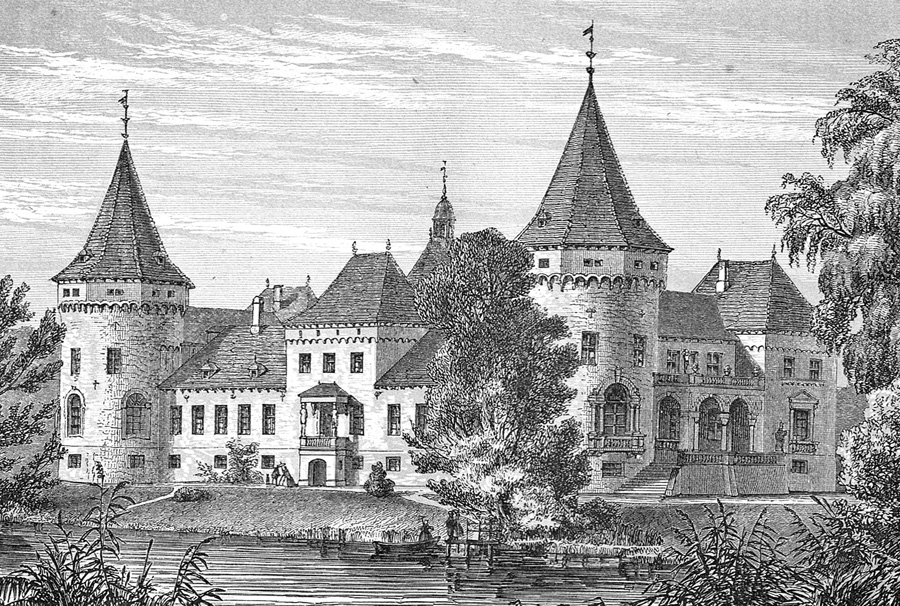
Pederstrup

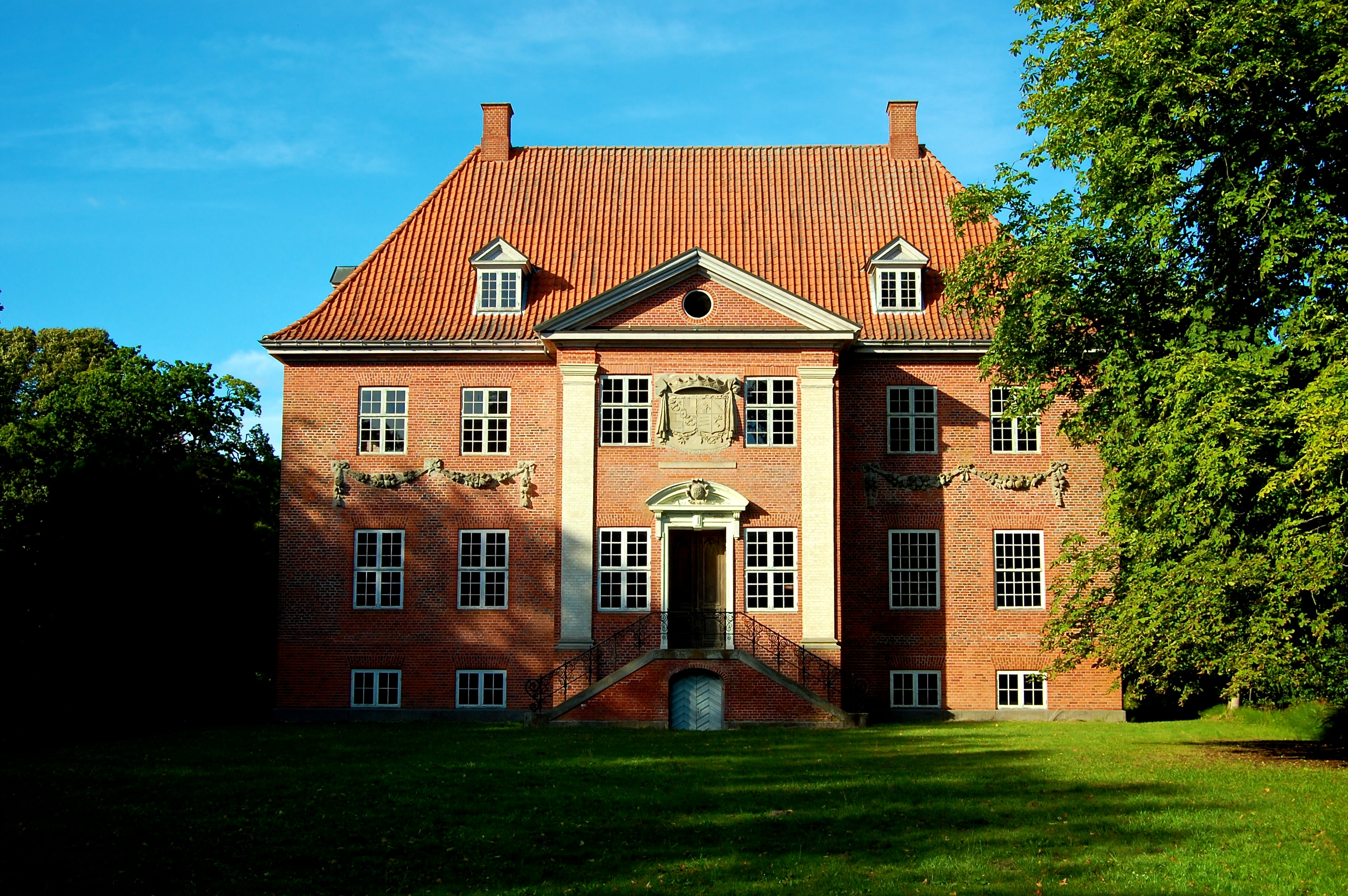
Christianssæde

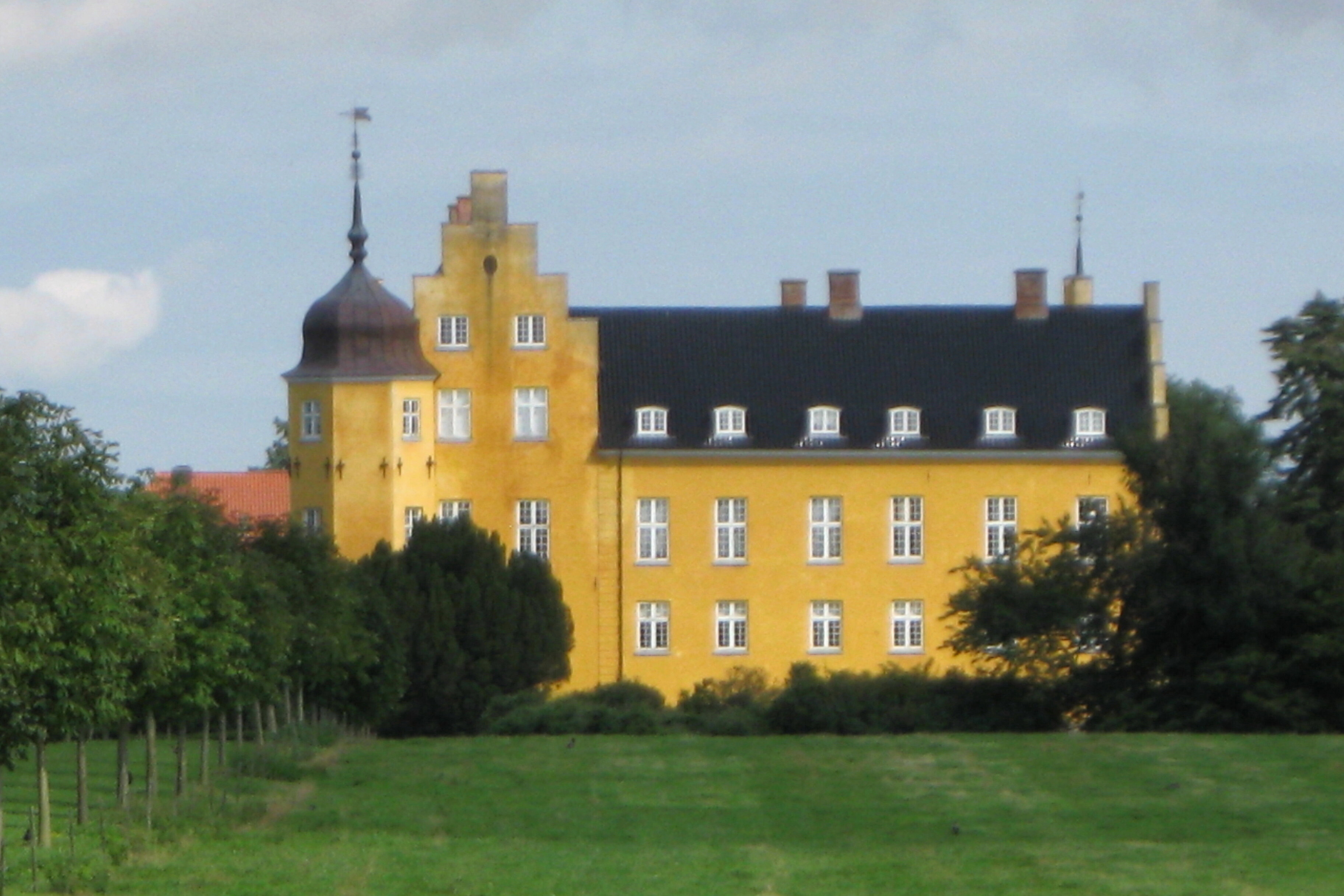
Krenkerup

== Coat of arms ==
The arms of the family is divided in the Zinnenschnitt of silver over red. It has red and silver mantling, and its crest features a golden ring mounted on a red rod surrounded with feathers.

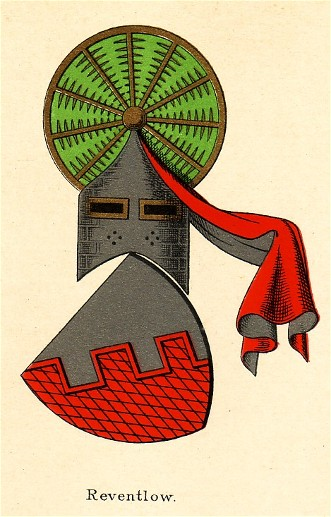
Coat of arms in Denmark's nobility Aarbog 1893

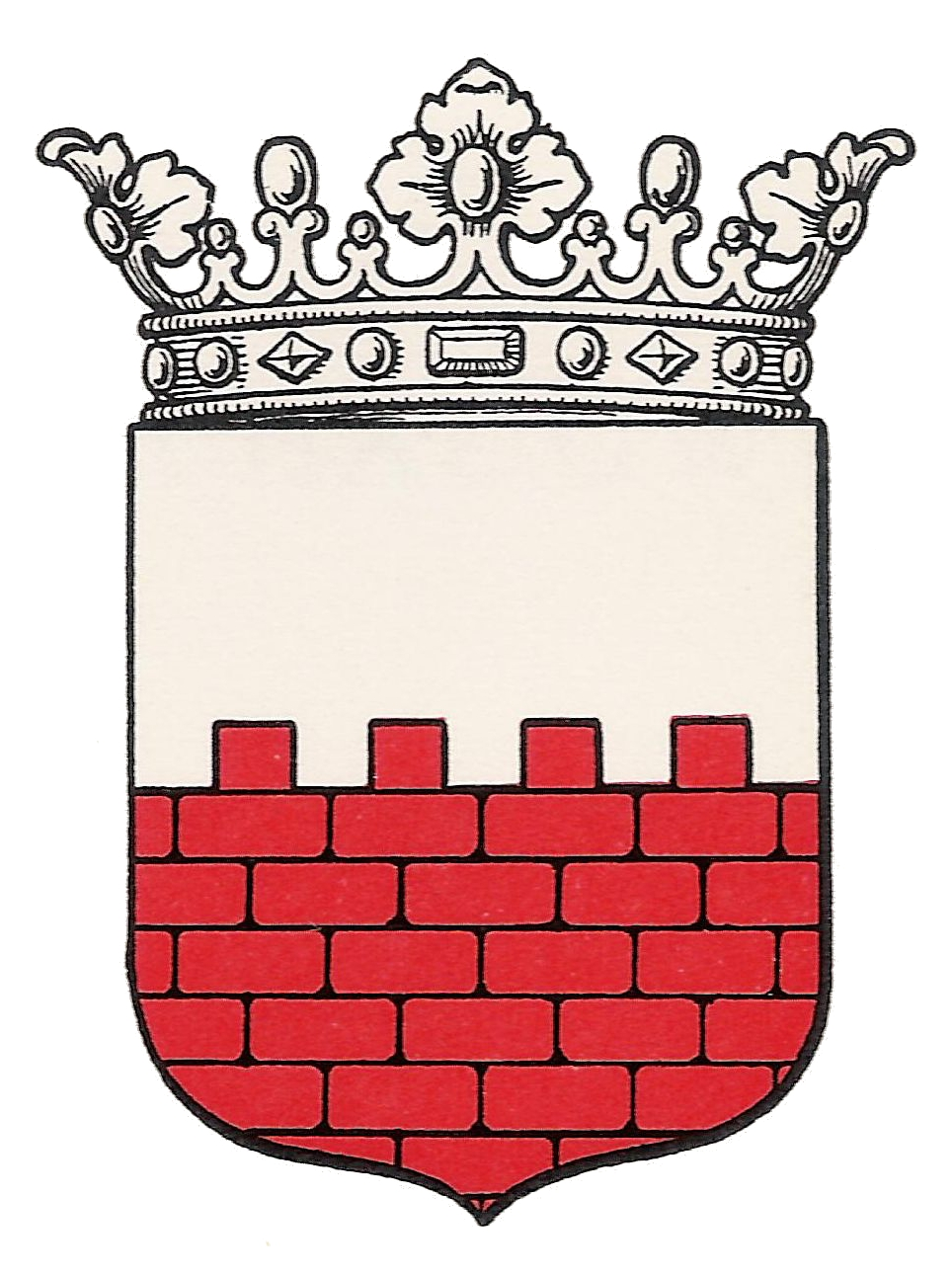
Coat of arms of the counts to Reventlow

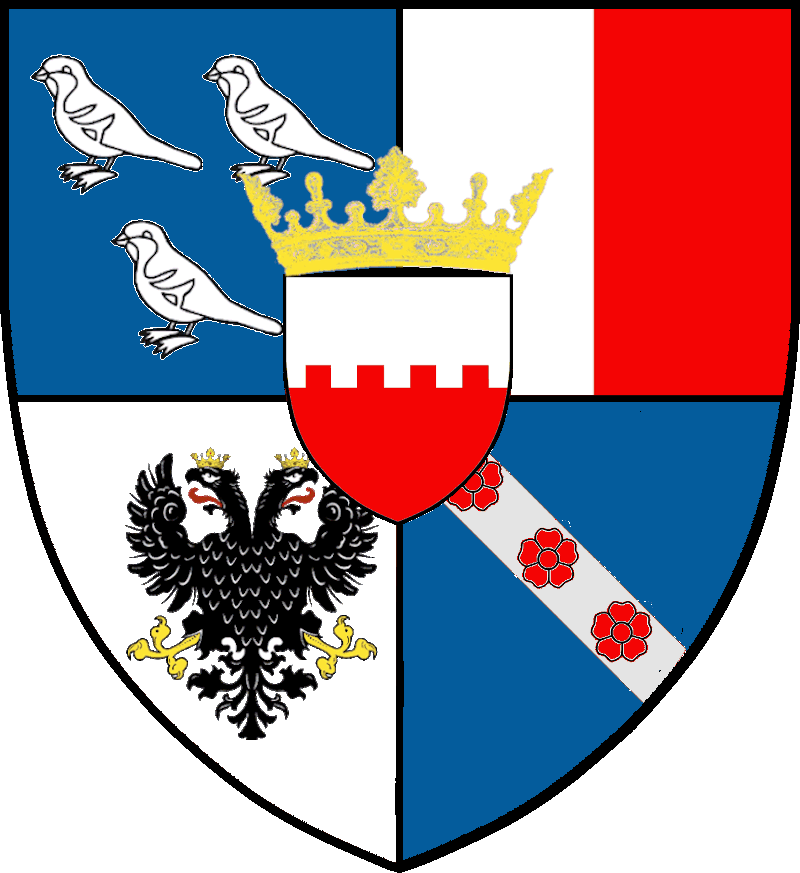
Coat of arms for Conrad von Reventlow (1644–1708) 1673

== Derived area coats ==
Elements and colours from the coat of arms of the family Reventlow appear today in some Schleswig-Holstein municipal coat of arms.

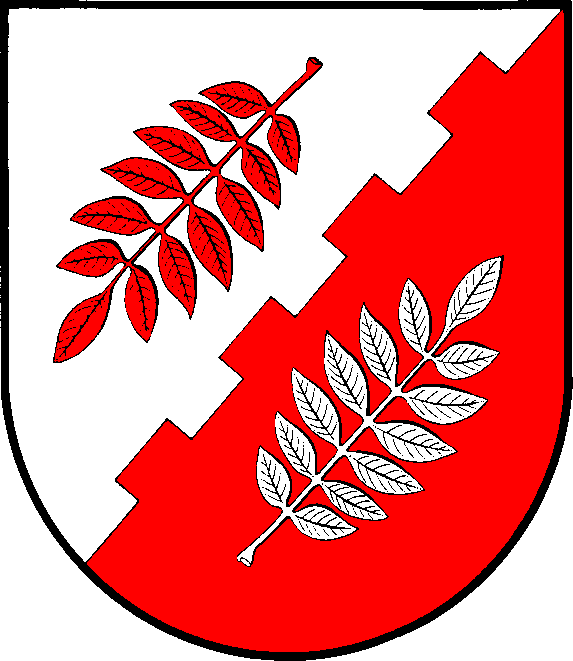
Ortswappen Altenhof (bei Eckernförde)

Ortswappen Martensrade

Ortswappen Windbergen

== Name bearers ==
- Anna Emerentia von Reventlow (1680–1753), prioress of Uetersen Monastery
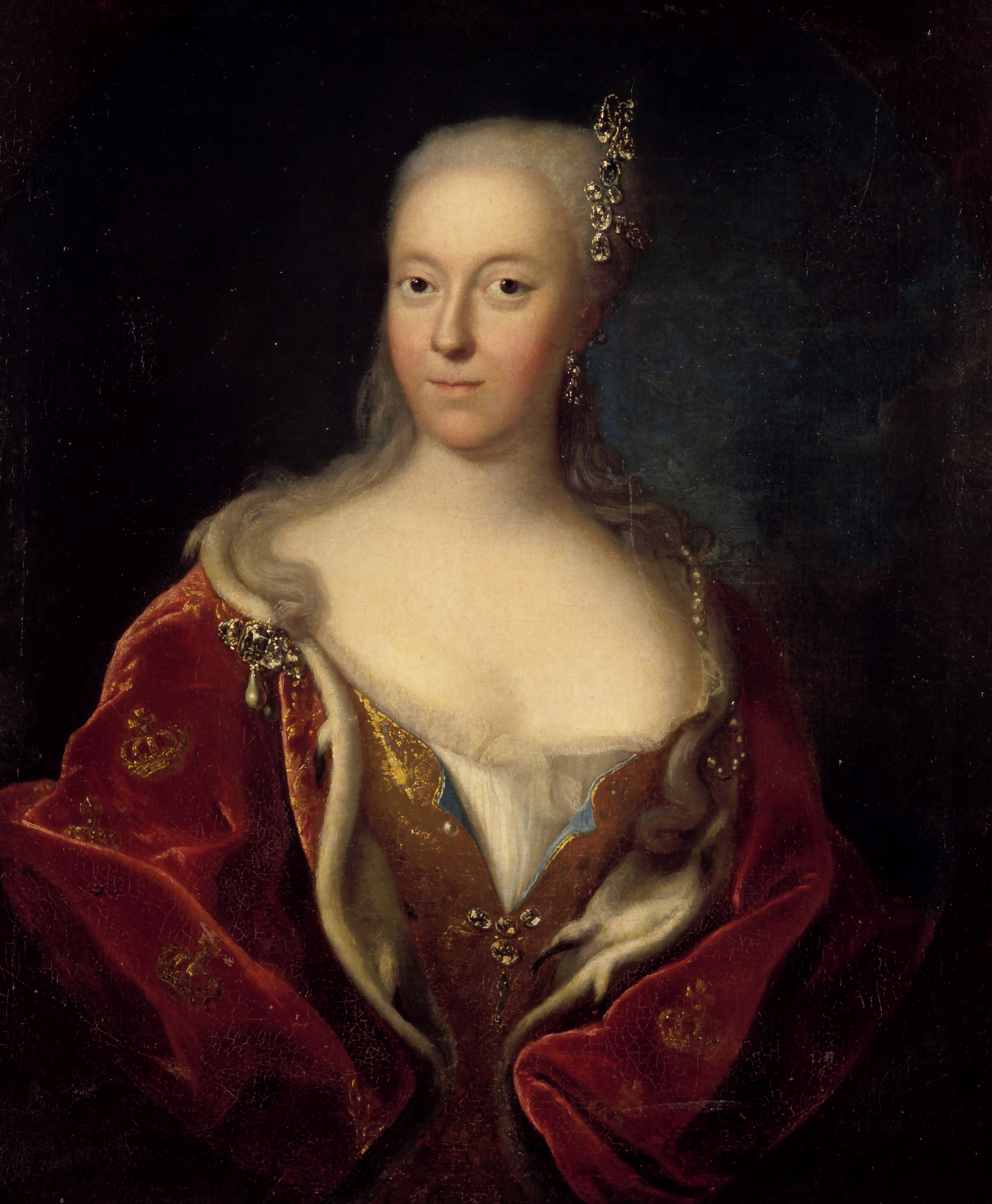
- Anna Sophie von Reventlow (1693–1743), Queen of Denmark
  Conrad Earl of Reventlow (1644–1708), Danish Chancellor and Prime Minister
- Christian Detlev of Reventlow (1671–1738), senior president of Altona
- Conrad Detlev (1704–1750) married Princess Wilhelmine Auguste of Schleswig-Holstein-Sonderburg-Plön
- Christian Detlev of Reventlow (1710–1775), Danish statesman
- Frederikke Charlotte Reventlow (1747–1822), Danish countess and writer
- Christian Detlev of Reventlow (1748–1827), Danish statesman and reformer, on Christians side and Pederstrup
- Ludwig Detlev Reventlow (1780–1857), Danish statesman
- Arthur Count von Reventlow (1817–1878), on Sandbjerg, German-Danish administrative lawyer
- Ludwig von Reventlow (1824–1893), Prussian district administrator, bailiff in the Duchy of Schleswig
- Ernst Count zu Reventlow (1869–1943), German writer, Lieutenant-Captain and politician (NSDAP)
- Ludwig von Reventlow (1864–1906), German lawyer, landowner on Wulfshagen and politician, Member of the Reichstag
- Fanny (Franziska) zu Reventlow (1871–1918), German writer
- Rolf Reventlow (1897–1981), son of Fanny to Reventlow
- Conrad Georg Reventlow (1749–1815), on Sandbjerg
- Johan Ludvig Reventlow (1751–1810), on Brahetrolleborg
- Christina Irmengardis (1711–1779), Duke Friedrich Karl of Schleswig-Holstein-Sonderburg-Plön
- Christine Sophie (1672–1757), I. Count Niels Friis (1665–1699), II. Ulrich Adolph Count of Holstein-Holsteinborg
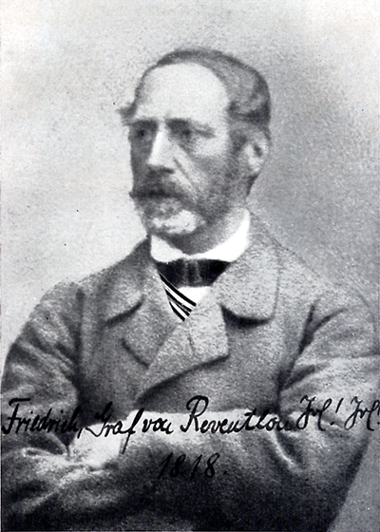
- Count Friedrich Count von Reventlow (1797–1874), 1849–1851 Governor of the Duchies Schleswig and Holstein
  Anna Sophie von Reventlow (1693–1743), Danish Queen (1721–1730), King Frederick IV.
- Detlev von Reventlow (1485–1536), first Protestant bishop of Lübeck and Danish chancellor
- Detlev of Reventlow (1654–1701), Royal Secret Conference Budget and District Administrator
- Heinrich von Reventlow (1678–1732), Imperial Court Counselor and monastery provost of Uetersen
- Detlev Count von Reventlow (1712–1783), diplomat and statesman in Danish service and curator of Kiel University
- Cay Friedrich von Reventlow (1753–1834), squire on Altenhof, diplomat and statesman in Danish service
- Eugen von Reventlow (1798–1885), squire on Altenhof with Aschau and Glasau, diplomat in Danish and Prussian services
- Gottfried von Reventlow (1800–1870), Court Court President in Ratzeburg
- Theodor von Reventlow (1801–1873), squire of the Holstein estates Jersbek and Stegen
- Friedrich Karl von Reventlow (1755–1828), curator of Kiel University and owner of Gut Emkendorf
- Friederike Juliane von Reventlow Schimmelmann (1762–1816), center of the Emkendorfer Literature Circle
- Heinrich von Reventlow (1763–1848), Major General
- Heinrich von Reventlow (1796–1841), bailiff of Flensburg, Bordesholm, Kiel and Kronshagen
- Adeline Countess von Reventlow (1839–1924), German animal painter of the Düsseldorf School
- Friedrich Graf von Reventlow (1797–1874), Schleswig-Holstein governor
- Ernst Christian von Reventlow (1799–1873) on Farve (Reventlow-Farve), landowner and politician
- Lance Graf von Haugwitz-Hardenberg-Reventlow, better known as Lance Reventlow (1936–1972), son of Barbara Hutton, entrepreneur, racecar driver, and socialite
- Henning Graf Reventlow (1929–2010), theologian
- Christian Friedrich Klaus Hermann Graf von Reventlow, Entrepreneur
