= Borreby =

Fortified manor house in Zealand, Denmark

Borreby Slot
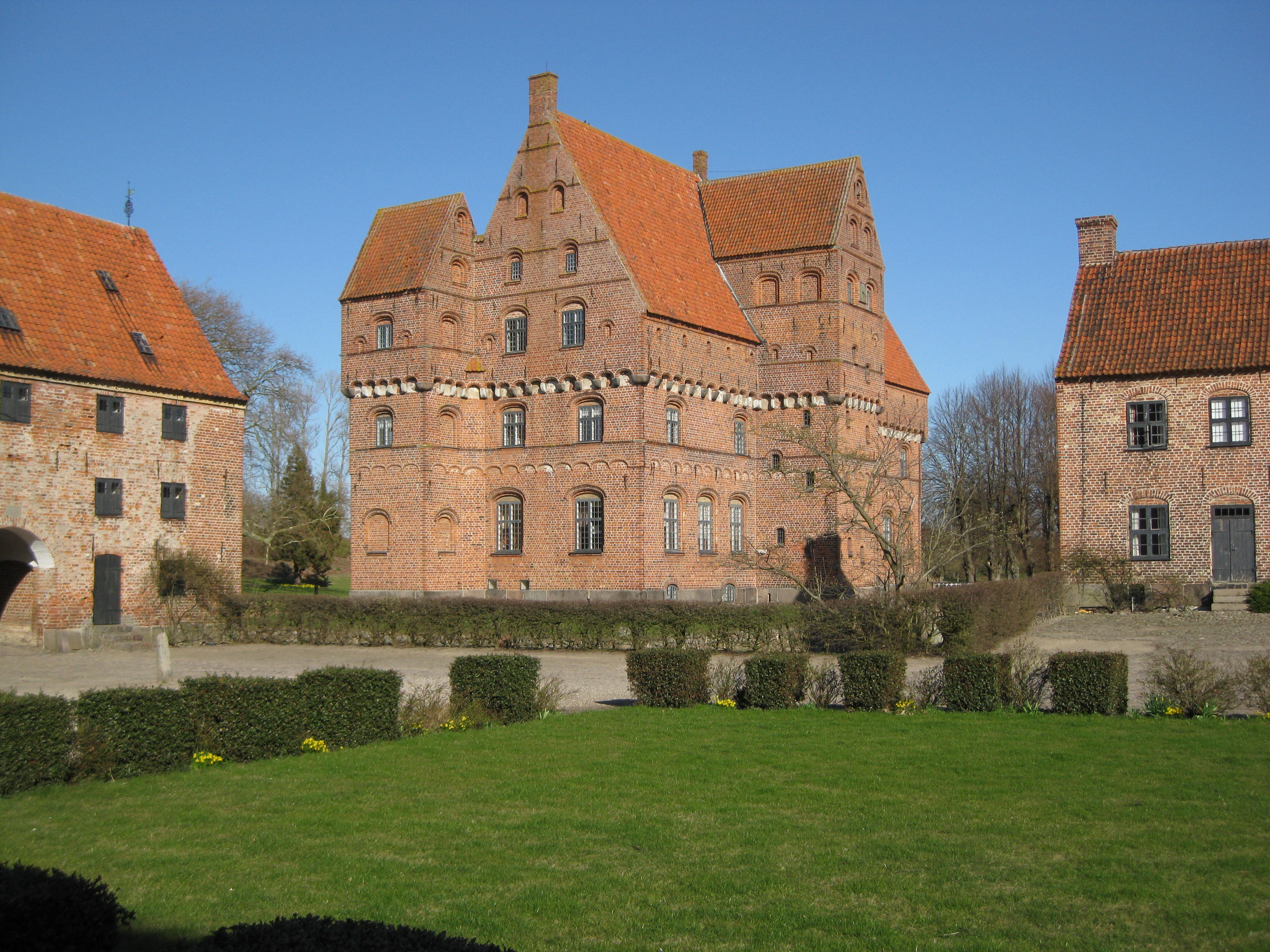
- Borreby Castle
- Interactive map of the Borreby Slot area

General information
- Architectural style: Renaissance
- Location: Slagelse Municipality, Borrebyvej 45, 4230 Skælskør, Denmark
- Coordinates: 55.2326°N 11.2909°E
- Completed: 1556
- Client: Johan Friis

Borreby Castle (Danish: Borreby Slot, pronounced [ˈpoːɐˌpyˀ ˈslʌt]) is a fortified manor house located near Skælskør, Slagelse Municipality, in the south-west corner of the island of Zealand, in eastern Denmark. The present main building was constructed for chancellor Johan Friis in the middle of the 16th century. The estate was acquired by Joachim Melchior Holten Castenschiold in 1783 and has remained in the hands of his descendents since then.

The main building and a number of other buildings were listed in the Danish register of protected buildings and places in 1918. A barn from 1593 has been converted into a theatre and music venue. The estate covers 722 hectares of land.

== History ==
=== Early history ===
First mentioned in 1345, by the end of the century Borreby had come into the possession of the Urne family, an important house of high nobility in Denmark at that time. In 1410 the estate was acquired by Bishop Peder Jensen Lodehat and it was then held by the Bishops of Roskilde until its confiscation by the Crown in 1536 in connection with the Reformation in 1534.

=== Friis and Daa families ===
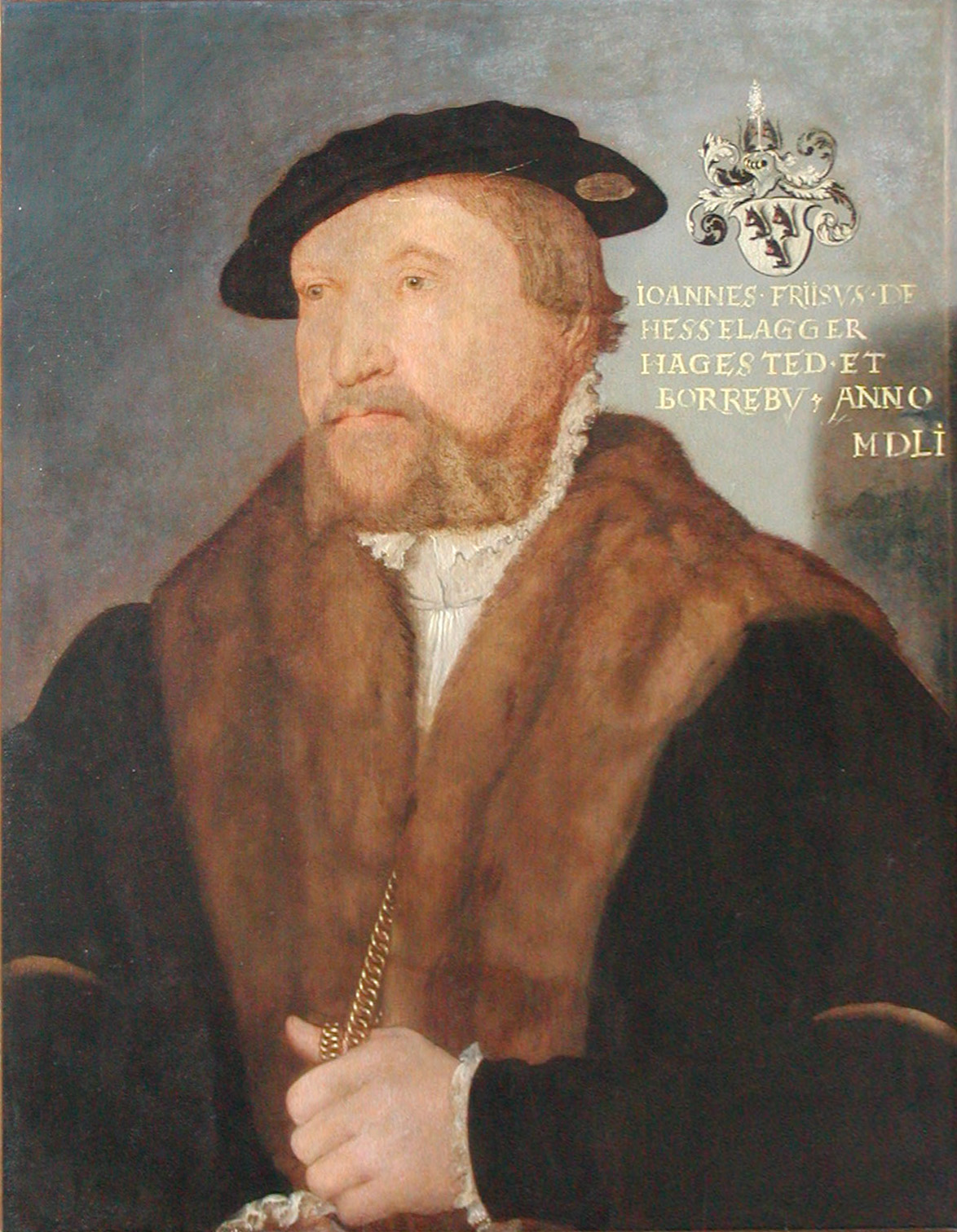
Johan Friis

In 1553, possibly somewhat earlier, King Frederick II ceded the property to Chancellor Johan Friis, one of the most powerful men in the country at the time, who also owned Hesselagergård on the island of Funen. In 1456 he built the current castle at a site 300 metres (980 ft) north of the old building.

After Johan Friis' death in 1570, Borreby was passed to his nephew, Christian Friis, who later followed in his uncle's footsteps as Chancellor from 1594 to 1616. Christian Friis expanded the complex with an extra moat and several new buildings, including two castle yard wings to the east and west, a gatehouse and several large farm buildings west of the castle.

Christian Friis' daughter Dorthe Friis brought Borreby into her marriage to Claus Daa. The estate was later passed down to his son Jørgen Daa and grandson Claus Daa. The latter's brothers Oluf and Valdemar Daa ran it into economic ruin during their ownership from 1652 to 1681. Valdemar Daa spent large sums on experiments with alkymism.

=== Changing owners, 1571–1783 ===
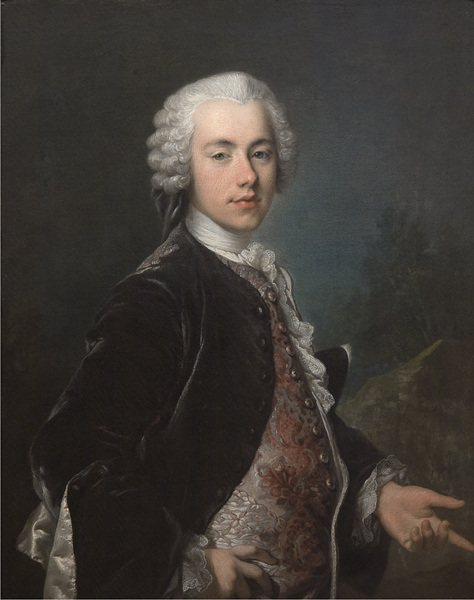
Frederik de Berregaard.

The next owner was Ove Ramel. His daughter Else sold Borreby in 1732 to Christian Berregaard. On his death, Borreby was passed first to his son Willum and then to his grandson Frederik.

In 1776, Frederik Berregaard sold Borreby to Hans Georg Faith (1751–1795). In 1783, Feith sold Borreby. In 1786, he purchased Edelgave noirthwest of Copenhagen. In 1791, he sold Edelsgave and bought Bødstrup at Kalundborg.

=== Castenschiold family ===
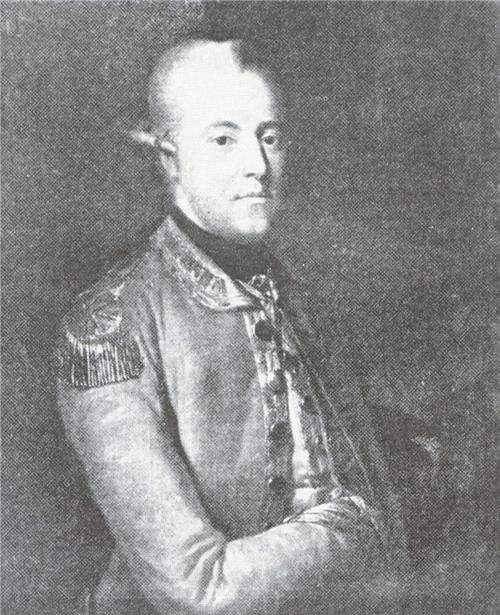
Castenschiold painted in 1799.

In 1783, Borreby was acquired by Major General Joachim Castenschiold.

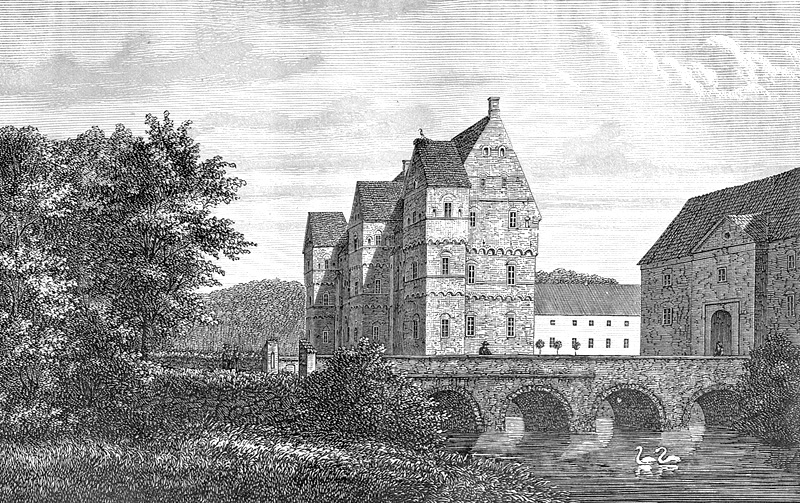
Borreby Castle in 1870

Together with nearby Holsteinborg and Basnæs, Borreby later in the century formed a small cluster of manor houses where Hans Christian Andersen was a frequent guest. In 1859 Andersen published his story "The Wind Tells about Valdemar Daae and His Daughters", a tragic tale of how the last descendant of Johan Friss to own Borreby lost the estate through his own foolish and quite unsuccessful experiments with alchemy.

The Castenschiold family still own the property.

== Architecture ==
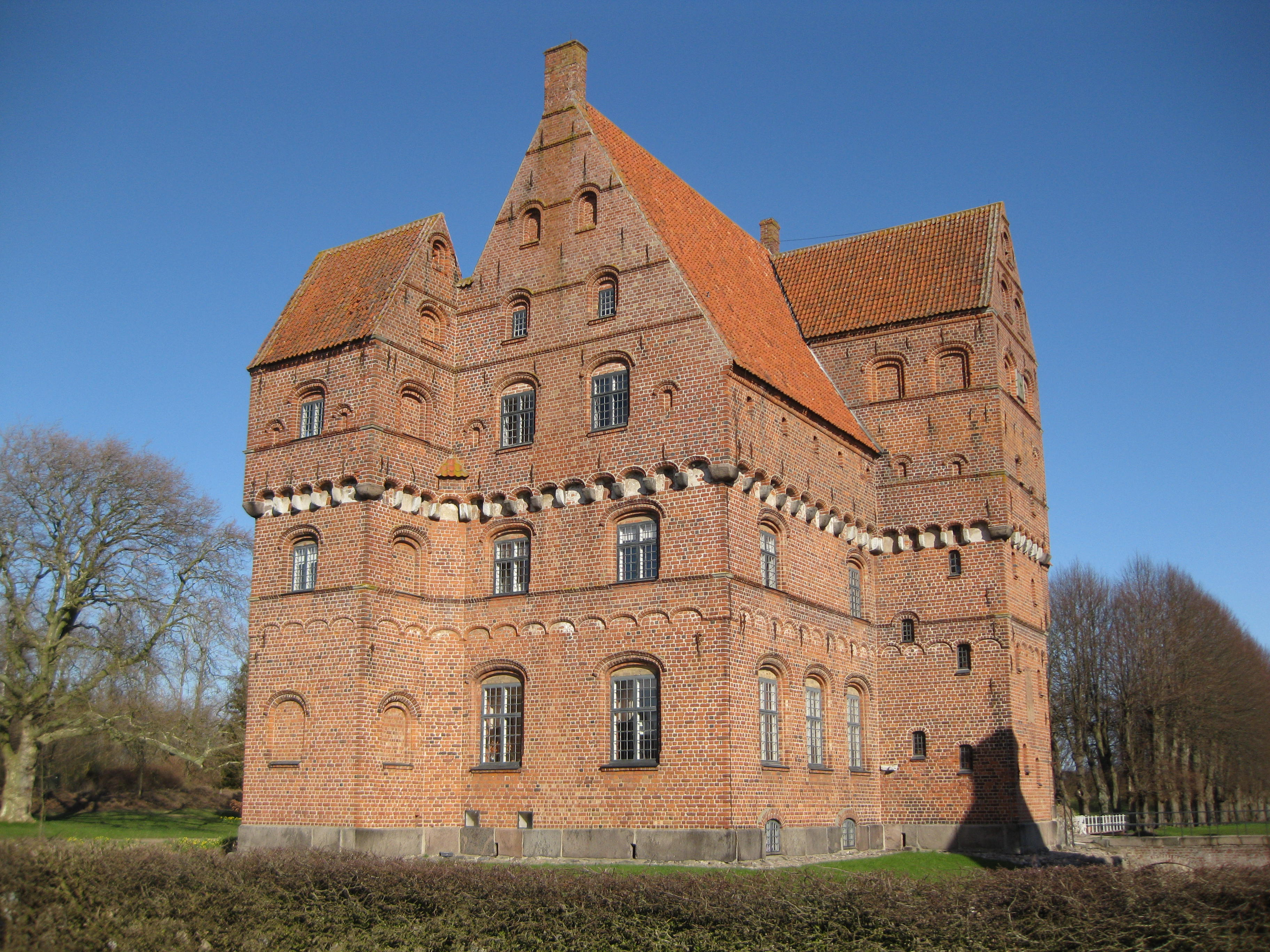
Main building

Built in red brick in the Renaissance style, Borreby consists of two and a half floors resting on stone plinth and topped by a pitched roof. There are four towers, three on the north side and a staircase tower on the south side. The masonry is decorated with arched friezes above each storey and the windows are topped by depressed arches.

The defensive character of the building is witnessed by machicolation holes which are found on all sides. Behind these there used to be a walkway which has now been removed, but machicolation holes can still be seen all round the building.

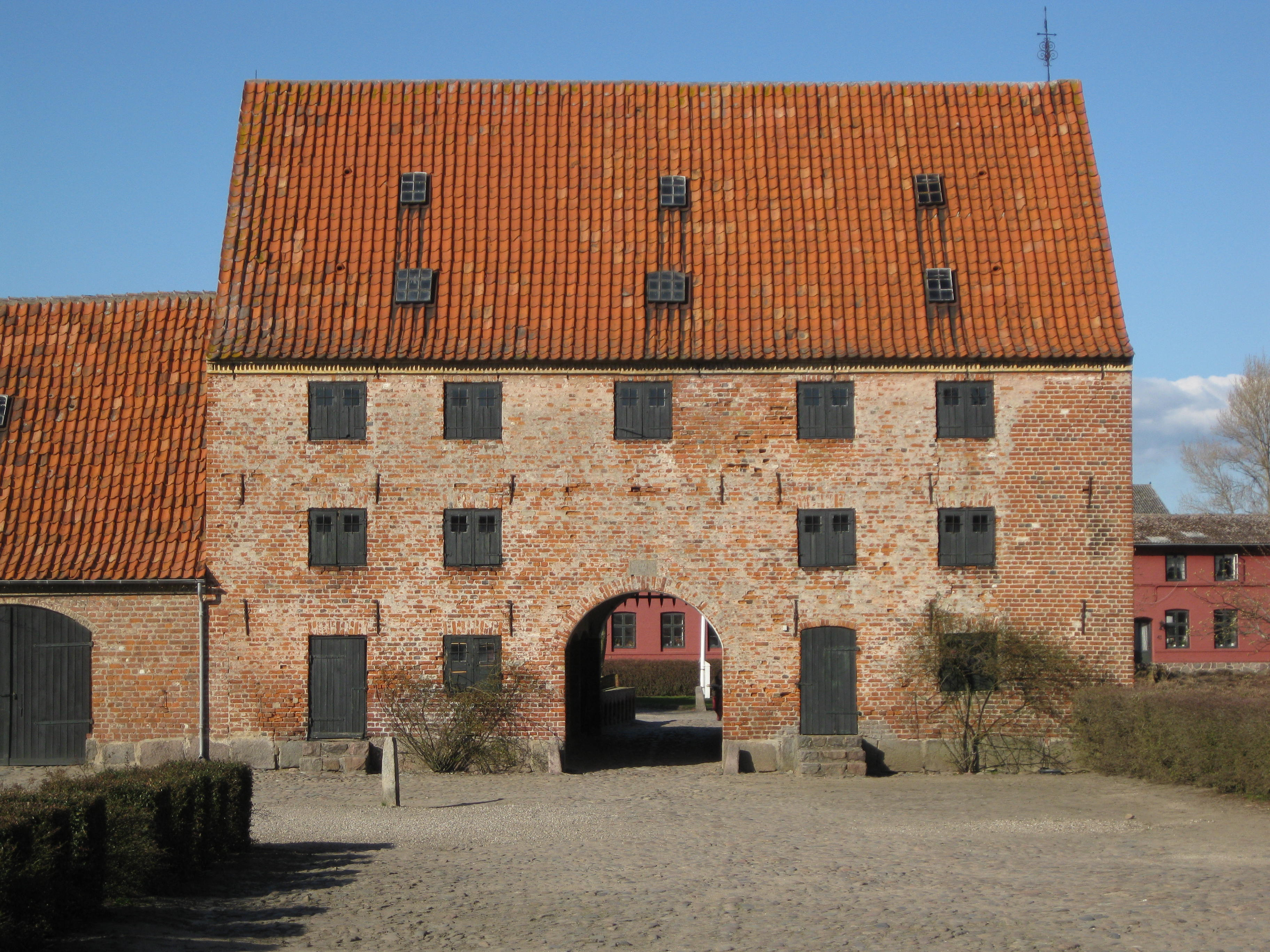
The gatehouse from 1600

The interior is dominated by Joachim Lorentz Holten Castenschiold's modernizations carried out in the 1750s and restorations from 1883 to 1884 and 1923–24.

The east and west wings of the outer courtyard date from Christian Friis' expansion, as does the gatehouse from 1600 and the large farm buildings located west of the castle. A chapel in the west wing was in its current form designed in 1754.

== Today ==
The estate covers 722 hectares od land of which 509 hecates are farmland, 17 hectares are meadows, 78 hecates are bogland and 8 hectares are parkland and lake.

== In the 21st century ==
Borreby Castle is owned by and managed as a modern agricultural estate with a large production of biomass for power stations on Zealand. There is public access free of charge to the outer courtyard and park with views of the historical buildings. The castle is also open for tours on prior notification.

The castle is also used as a cultural venue. Borreby Art Gallery is based in the former courthouse as well as some former stables. Borreby Theatre with a capacity of 450 spectators is currently under construction in a former barn, and other buildings will house a restaurant and café.

== List of owners ==
- (1345) Niels Jensen
- (-1392) Lave Nielsen Urne
- (1392–) Zabel Kerkendorp
- (-1410) Fikke Kerkendorp
- (-1410) Radike Kerkendorp
- (1410–) Roskilde Bispestol
- (-1536) Grev Christoffer
- (1536–1553) Kronen
- (1553–1570) Johan Friis
- (1570–1616) Christian Friis
- (1616–1617) Mette Hardenberg, gift Friis
- (1617–1618) Dorthe Friis, gift Daa
- (1618–1641) Claus Daa
- (1641–1652) Jørgen Daa
- (1652–1666) Oluf Daa
- (1652–1681) Valdemar Daa
- (1681–1685) Ove Ramel
- (1685–1730) Mette Rosenkrantz, gift Ramel
- (1730–1732) Else Ovesdatter Ramel
- (1732–1750) Christian Berregaard
- (1750–1769) Villum Berregaard
- (1769–) Beata Antonia Augusta Reuss-Lobenstein, gift Berregaard
- (-1776) Frederik Berregaard
- (1776–1783) Hans Georg Faith
- (1783–1817) Joachim Castenschiold
- (1817–1832) Henrik Gisbert Castenschiold
- (1832–1865) Adolph Frederik Holten Castenschiold
- (1865–1919) Carl Vilhelm Behagen Castenschiold
- (1919–1945) Adolf Frederik Holten Castenschiold
- (1945–1961) Carl Christian Henrik Castenschiold
- (-present) Joachim Lorentz Castenschiold
