= Christian Ditlev Ammentorp Hansen =

Danish pharmacist (1843–1916)

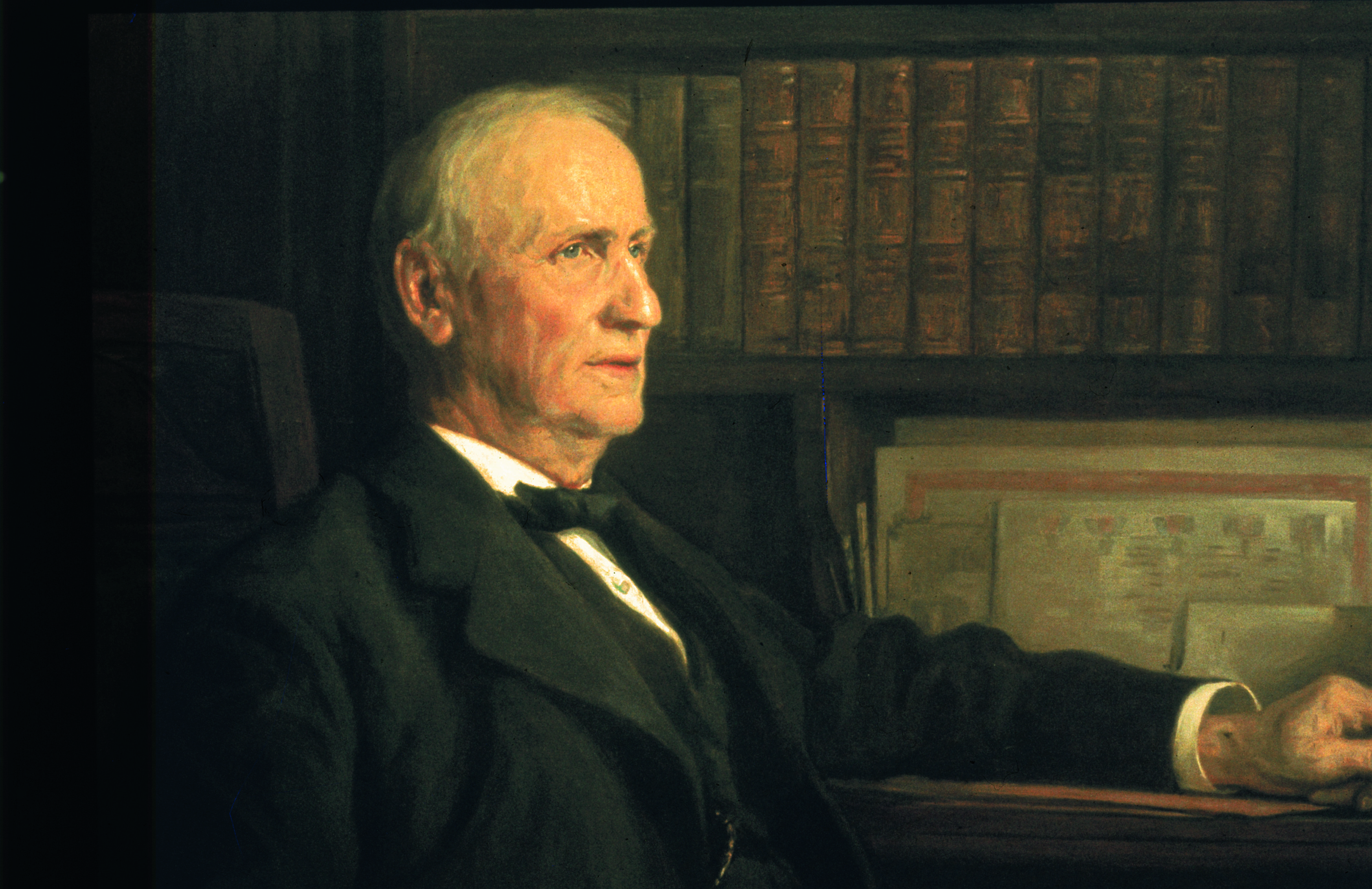
- Hansen painted by Knud Larsen in 1913
- Born: 25 February 1843; Kragsbjerg, Funen, Denmark
- Died: 20 June 1916 (aged 73); Copenhagen, Denmark
- Occupations: Pharmacist and industrialist

Christian Ditlev Ammentorp Hansen (25 February 1843 – 20 June 1916) was a Danish pharmacist and industrialist. He founded Christian Hansen's Technical-Chemical Laboratory (Chr. Hansen), which revolutionized the production of wholesome dairy products in the 1870s. He also had a key role in the establishment of the Danish Pharmaceutical College in Copenhagen in 1892, financing its first building in Stockholmsgade out of his own pocket. He owned Mullerup on Funen and Bøstrup at Slagelse.

== Early life ==
Hansen was born on 25 February 1843 at Kragsbjerg, near Odense the son of Christian Henrik Hansen (1797-1868) and Bertha Marie Ammentorp (1805-1848). He attended Slagelse Realskole in Slagelse and then Ålborg Latinskole in Aalborg.

== Pharmacist ==
Hansen apprenticed as a pharmacist at the pharmacy of Frederick's Hospital in Copenhagen, 1859. He passed his exams as an assistant pharmacist in 1862 and then worked at the pharmacy in Højer from 1862 to 1864 before passing his pharmaceutical exams in 1865. He then spent half a year at the pharmacy in Thisted before returning to Copenhagen where he worked as an assistant at the University of Copenhagen's Chemical Laboratory from 1870 to 72.

He published Pharmacopoea Danica in Danish in 1869. He also established the magazine Ny farmaceutisk Tidende. In 1972, he received the university's gold medal for Udvikling af Forholdet mellem et Stofs Krystalform og dets kemiske Sammensætning.

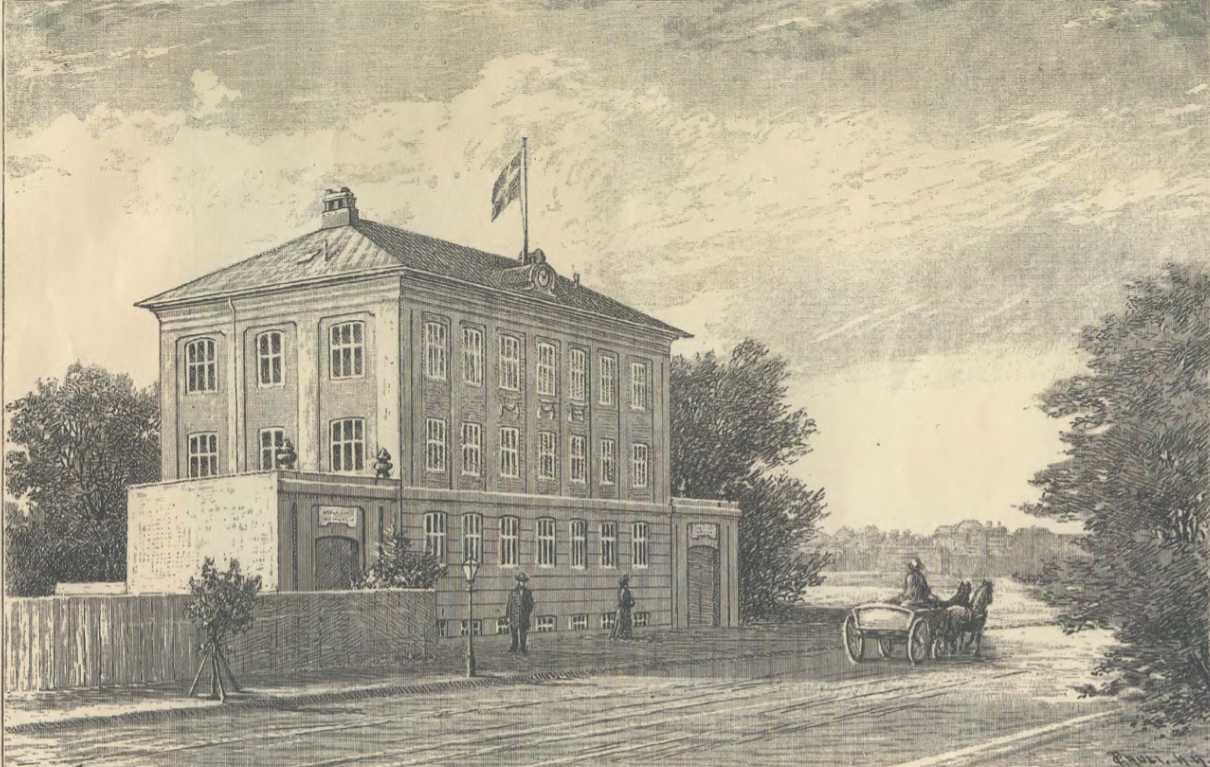
The new Pharmaceutical College in Stockholmsgade

He then went on a journey sabbatical on a government stipend to study pharmaceutical colleges and manufacturing plants. Back in Copenhagen, in 1876, he received a license to establish a pharmacy in the new Gammelholm neighbourhood. Gammelholm Pharmacy opened at Holbergsgade 11 the following year.

He was a member of the Pharmaceutical Educational Commission from 1887. In 1891, he financed the construction of the new Pharmaceutical College in Stockholmsgade out of his own pocket. It opened in 1892 with Hansen as its first principal.

He was chairman of the Foundation for the Promotion of Pharmaceutical Education in Denmark from 1891 and was the same year made an honorary members of the Danish Association of Pharmacists.

== Christian Hansen's Technical-Chemical Laboratory ==
Hansen was also involved in a number of industrial enterprises. He established Maglekilde og Frederiksberg Brøndanstalt for a limited company in 1873 and for a few years after its opening served as its technical director.

In 1874, he established an industrial production of rennet. It was a big commercial success. His research also contributed to the improvement of Danish cheese production in other ways. He presented his results at the Danish Agricultural Assembly in Aalborg in 1883.

== Property ==
In 1880, Hansen acquired Bødstrup at Slagelse. In 1882, he also acquired Mullerup on Funen. He commissioned the architect Charles Abrahams to renovate both main buildings. In 1889, he was elected to president of Svendborg Amts landøkonomiske Selskab.

== Personal life ==
Hansen married Cecilia Elisa Købke (9 September 1846 - 4 March 1879) on 24 March 1869 in Korsør. He was second time married to Agnes Mathilde Hedemann (3 September 1858 - 14 May1930) on 30 September 1880 in Copenhagen.

He had five children with his first wife, of which only two survived to adulthood, Johannes Hansen (1872-1960) and Gerda Hansen. Johannes Hansen studied engineering and later served as CRO of Chr. Hansen.

His second wife bore him four children: Nancy Hansen (1881-1949), Viggo Christian Hansen (1884-1963), Einar Hansen Bernhoft (1886-1958) and Agnes Marie Mathilde Almira Hansen (1888, Mullerup-1978).

Hansen died on 20 June 1916 in Copenhagen.

Bøstrup was taken over by Ejnar Hansen while Mullerup was passed on to Agnes Hansen. In 1930, Ejnar Hansen also acquired Mullerup. Both estates are still owned by his descendants.
