= Christian Hans von Warnstedt =

Danish court official and county governor

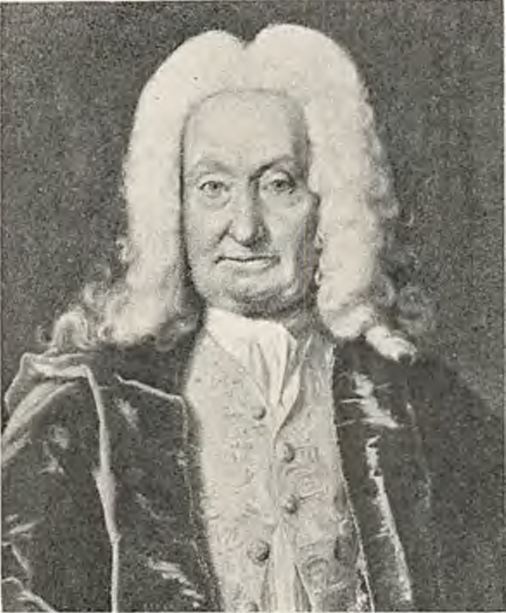
Christian Hans von Warnstedt.

Christian Hans Warnstedt (1675 – 31 December 1742) was a Danish court official county governor of Jorsør and Antvorskov counties.

== Early life and education ==
Warnstedt was born in 1675 to colonel Frederik Vilhelm von Warnstedt (1620–1677) and baroness Elisabeth Anna von Lützow.

== Career ==
Warnstedt became a page at the Royal Danish Court in 1693. He was later promoted to 1st Kammerjunker for Prince Carl. From 20 November 1730 to 25 September 1734, he served as county governor of Antvorskov and Korsør counties. On 20 March 1731, he was awarded the title of etatsråd.

== Personal life ==
Warnstedt was married to Louise Hedvig Baronesse Diede zum Fürstenstein (died 1733). She was a daughter of Hans Eiler Baron Diede zum Fürstenstein and Clara Anna con Buttlar-Elberberg.

In 1734, he bought Knardrupsdal at Ølstykke. He died at Antvorskov on 31 December 1742. Johan Hørner has painted a portrait of him.

He was survived by a son and two daughters. The son Johan Ludvig von Warnstedt (1710-1755) was an infantry captain. He was married twice, first to Ingeborg Marie Ebio and then to Marianna von Holtern. The elder daughter Sophia Hedvig von Warnstedt (1707–1768) was married to Christoph Ernst von Beulwitz. The younger other daughter Margrethe Sophie Magdalene von Warnstedt Kvinde (1708–1792) was married to baron Mogens Holck.

Civic offices
Preceded by Frederik Rostgaard	County Governor of AntvorskovCounty; 1730–1734	Succeeded by Christian Berregaard
Preceded by Frederik Rostgaard	County Governor of Korsør County; 1730—1734	Succeeded by Christian Berregaard
