= Christian Berregaard =

Danish Supreme Court justice, government official and landowner

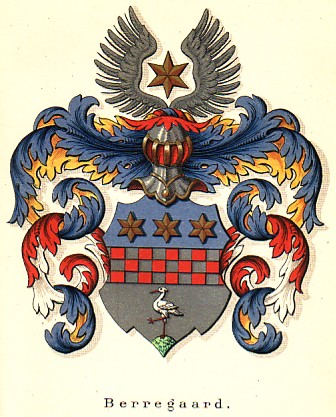
Coat of arms

Christian Frederik Berregaard (née Bjerregaard/Bierregaard, 26 October 1683 – 2 August 1750) was a Danish Supreme Court justice, government official and landowner. He served as burgermaster in Copenhagen and county governor of Korsør and Antvorskov counties. Together with his father, Enevold Bjerregaard, who owned Jøkbygaard in northern Jutland, and brother Frederik Bjerregaard, who owned Ørslev Kloster at Viborg, he was ennobled by letters patent under the name de Berregaard on 20 August 1726.

His city home in Copenhagen was the building now known as Assistenshuset. The building, which is now home to the Ministry of Culture, was constructed for him in 1730–1731. The current appearance of the building is, however, the result of a major renovation undertaken for the Royal Pawn by Philip de Lange in the 1760s. Berregaard's other holdings included Borreby at Slagelse and Kølbygaard in northern Jutland.

== Early life and education ==
Berregaard was born on 26 October 1683 to Enevold Nielsen Berregaard and Anne Kristensdatter Søe (1646—1736). His father served as burgermaster of Thisted.

Berregaard attended the Knight's Academy in Copenhagen and was later educated in Danske Kancelli.

== Career ==
Berregaard entered court service as a page (hofjunker) in 1705. In 1707, he was appointed judge at Hofretten. On 25 December 1713, he was appointed deputy burgermaster in Copenhagen. On 19 April 1715, Berregaard was appointed Supreme Court justice. In 1729, he left the post as burgermaster to become councillor of finances (deputeret for finanserne). On 6 June 1731, he was awarded the title of kancelliråd.

On 26 September 1734, he was appointed county governor of Antvorskov and Korsør counties. He remained in this office until 14 August 1741.

== Property ==
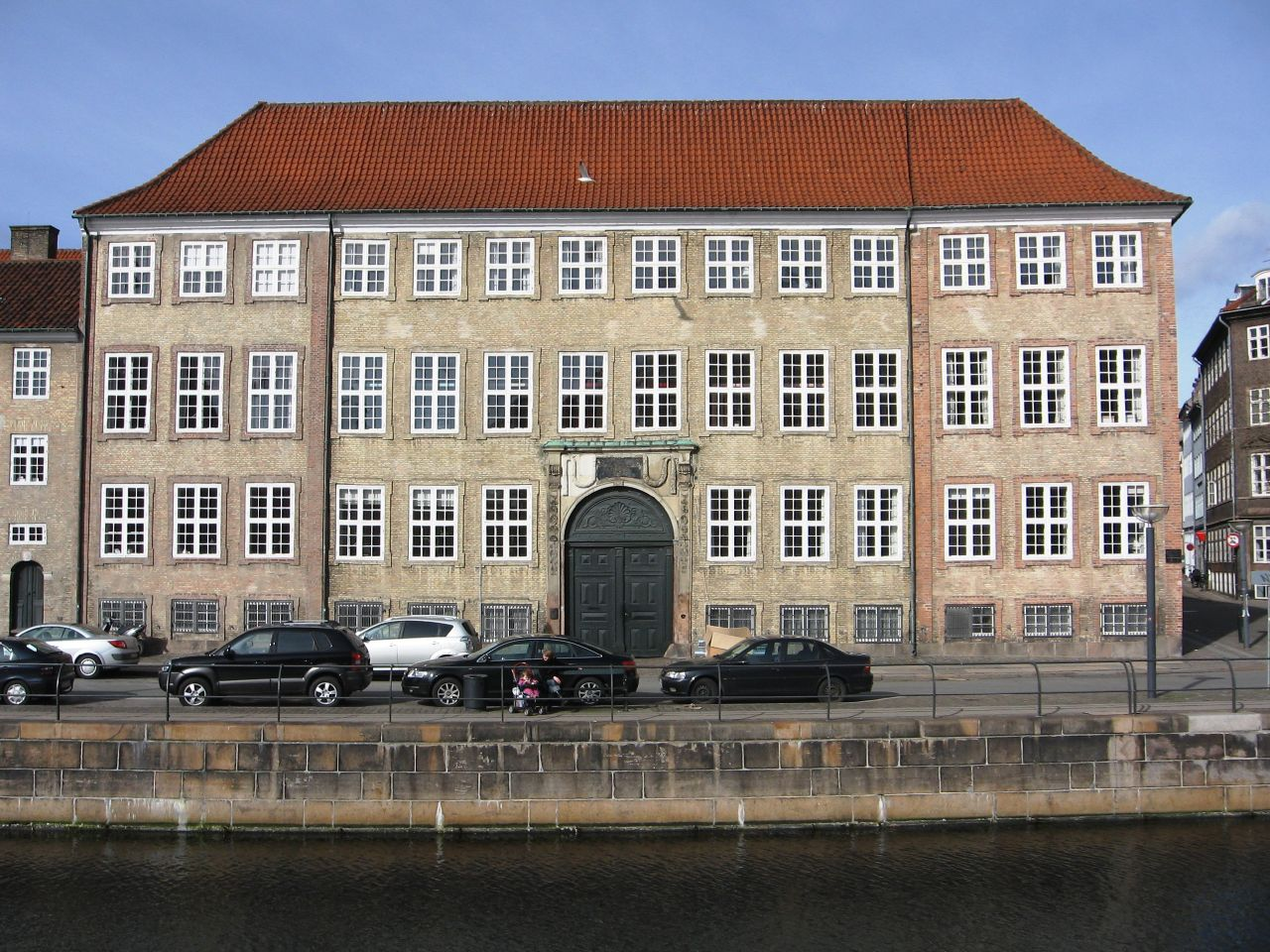
The Assistenshuset building in Copenhagen

In 1716 (deed issued on 18 June 1716), Berregaard purchased a large property at the corner of Nsaregade and Gammelstrand (No.2, Snaren's Quarter) from Commodore Christopher Christophersen. The building was destroyed in the Fire of 1728. In 1730–1731, he had it replaced by a large new building.

On 20 August 1726, Berregaard's father was ennobled under the name de Berregaard. In 1724, Berregaard's elder brother Frederik bought Ørslev Kloster at Viborg. In 1837, he succeeded his father to Stamhuset Kjølbygaard. In 1741, he merged it with Vesløsgård.

In 1731, Berregaard purchased Borreby at Slagelse. In 1837,, he succeeded his father to Stamhuset Kjølbygaard. In 1741, he merged it with Vesløsgård.

== Personal life ==
On 21 July 1711, Berregaard was married to Jytte Worm (1685—1741). She was a daughter of Supreme Court president Villum Worm and Else Luxdorph.

Berregaard died on 2 August 1750. He is buried in Thisted Church. An epitaph in the church commemorates his parents and their two sons.

Berregaard's son Villum Berregaard succeeded him as county governor of Antvorskov and Korsør counties.

Civic offices
Preceded by Christian Hans von Warnstedt	County Governor of Antvorskov Amt; 1734—1741	Succeeded by Villum Berregaard
Preceded by Christian Hans von Warnstedt	County Governor of Korsør County; 1734—1741	Succeeded by Villum Berregaard
