= Villum Berregaard =

Danish government official and Supreme Court justice

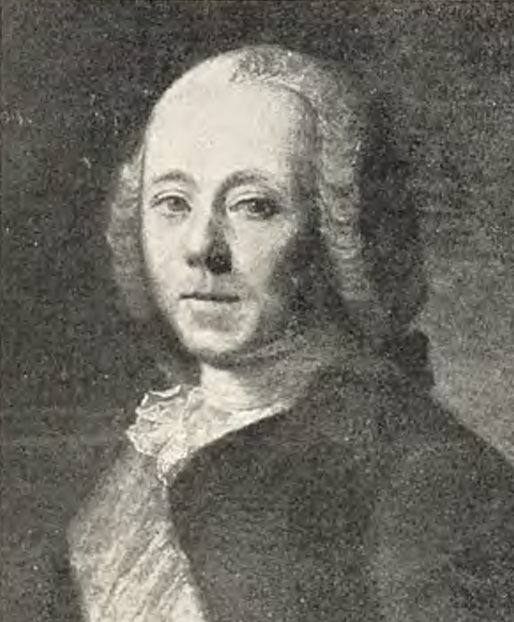
Villum Berregaard.

Villum Berregaard (2 January 1717 – 1 December 1769) was a Danish government official and Supreme Court justice.

== Early life and education ==
Berregaard was born on 2 January 1717 at Antvorskov, the son of chamberlain Christian Frederik Berregaard (1683–1750) and Jytte Worm (1683–1741). His father was a major landowner whose holdings included til Kølbygård, Borreby and Antvorskow. He was the cousin of Bolle Luxdorph.

== Career ==
In 1736, Berregaard was appointed as hofjunker. In the same year, he became a councillor (kommiteret) in kammerkollegiet.

In 1741, Berregaard was appointed as county governor of Korsør and Antvorskov. In 1771, he became a councillor (deputeret) in Admiralitets- og Kommissariatskollegiet. In 1753, he was also appointed as a Supreme Court justice. In 1759, he became director of the Poor Authority (De Fattiages Værn). In 1763, he became director of the Økonomi- og Kommercekollegiet. In 1767, he became 1st Councillor in Ekstraskattekommissionen. In 1769, he was appointed as president of the Supreme Court.

== Property ==
After his father's death, Berregaard became the owner of Borreby and Kølbygård. In 1766, he constructed a new main building on the latter este (later demolished).

== Personal life ==
Berregaard was married to Beate Antonia Augusta of Reuss-Lobenstein (1723-1797= on 25 November 1749. She was a daughter of count Heinrich XXIII af Reuss-Lobenstein (1680–1723) and Beate Henriette von Söhlenthal (1696–1757).

He died on 1 December 1769 in Copenhagen and is buried at Thisted Church.

== Awards ==
Berregaard was awarded the title of justitsråd in 1739, etatsråd in 1745, Konferensråd in 1749, and Gehejmeråd in 1878. In 1749, he was also appointed as chamberlain. In 1767, he was created a White Knight. In 1761, he was awarded the L'Union parfaite.

Civic offices
Preceded by Christian Berregaard	County Governor of Antvorskov Amt; 1741—1751	Succeeded by Frederik de Løvenørn
Preceded by Christian Berregaard	County Governor of Korsør County; 1734—1741	Succeeded by Frederik de L'venørn
