= Christoph Ernst von Beulwitz =

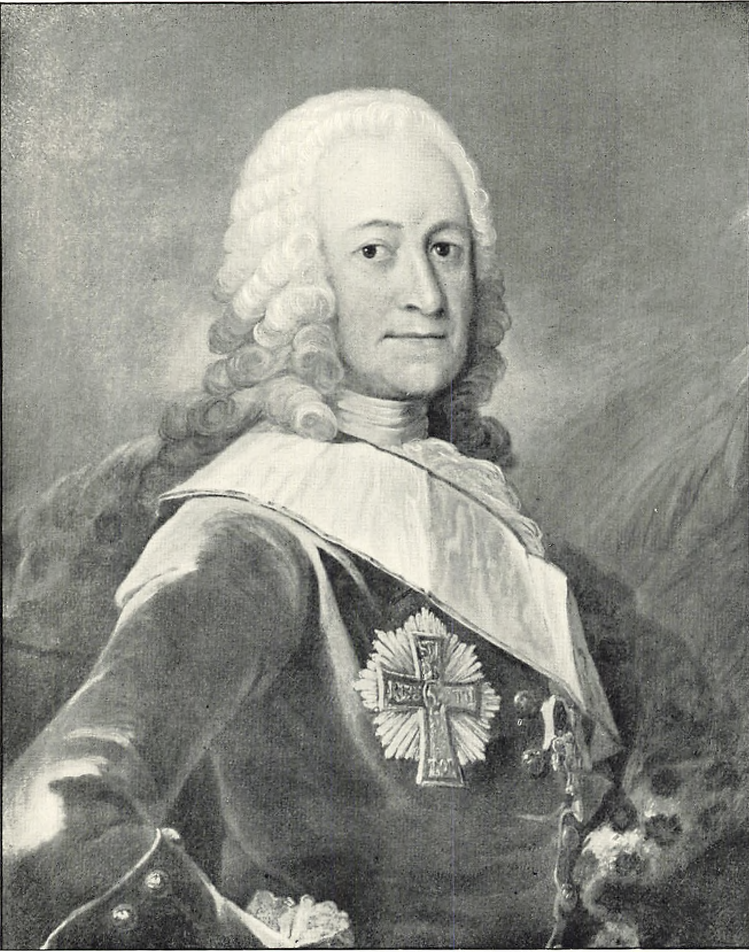
Christoph Ernst von Beulwitz.

Christoph Ernst von Beulwitz (14 February 1695 – 17 April 1757) was a German-Danish privy councillor, county governor and headmaster of Sorø Academy. His daughter, Frederikke Charlotte Reventlow, became a renowned author and letter writer.

== Early life and education ==
Beulwitz was born on 14 February 1695 at Löhma in Württemberg, the son of Gottfried Christian von Beulwitz (died 1726) and Catharina Magdalene von Reitzenstein (1658–c. 1720). His mother had previously been married to Adam Friedrich Thoss von Erlbach til Prex (died 1688). His father owned the estates Löhma and Weitisberge. In 1712–15, Beulwitz studied in Jena.

== Career ==
Beulwitz started his career as Hofmeister at the courts in Nassau-Saarbrücken and Württemberg. In 1732, he was appointed government councillor and Lehnprobs. In 1737, he was promoted to heheimeraat. In 1738, he moved to Denmark to serve as hofmeister for crown prince Frederick. In the same year, he became a councillor (deputeret) in Generallandøkonomi- og Lommercekollegiet. In 1743, he was appointed county governor of Sorø County and headmaster of Sorø Academy. In 1745, he was appointed overlanddrost in Oldenburg and Delmenhorst. In 1752, he was appointed county governor of Steinburg and chancellor of the government council in Glückstadt.

In 1738, he was awarded the title of Konferensråd . In 1745, he was promoted to Gehejmeråd.

== Personal life ==
On 9 June 1733 at Schwieberdingen, Beulwitz married Bibiane Henriette von Wallbrunn (1705–1735). She was a daughter of gehejmeråd Johann Christoph von Wallbrunn (1661–1729) and Eberhardine Henriette von Stockheim (1670–1745). After the death of his first wife, he remarried on 30 July 1743 at Frederiksborg Chapel to Sophie Hedevig von Warnstedt (1707–1768). She was a daughter of county governor of Antvorskov, Christian Hans von Warnstedt, and Louise Hedevig Diede zum Fürstenstein (d. 1733). Their daughter and only child, Sophie Frederikke Louise Charlotte von Beulwitz, married Christian Ditlev Frederik Reventlow.

Government offices
| Preceded by Wilhelm August von der Osten | County governor of Sorø Amt; 1743—1745 | Succeeded by Heinrich von Reuss |
| Preceded by Conrad Detlev von Dehn | County governor of Steinburg Amt; 1728–1732 | Succeeded by Friedrich Christian Friccius von Schilden |
