= Joachim Castenschiold =

Danish army officer and landowner (1743–1817)

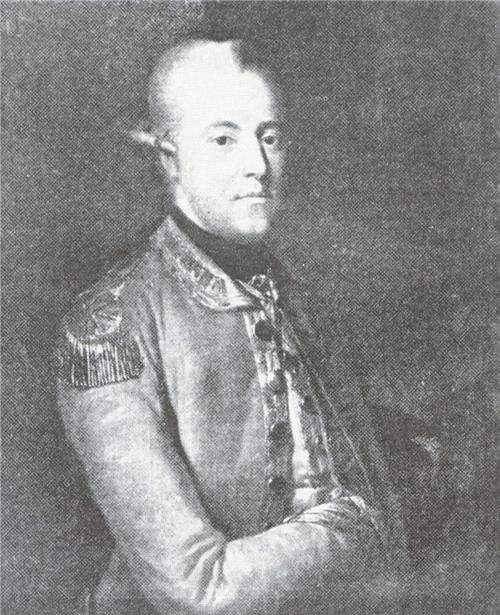
- 1779 portrait
- Born: 29 November 1743
- Died: 6 April 1817 (aged 73); Borreby, Denmark
- Burial place: Magleby Church, Denmark
- Military career
- Allegiance: Denmark-Norway
- Branch: Royal Danish Army
- Service years: 1760–1807
- Rank: Lieutenant-General
- Unit: Schleswig Cuirassier Regiment
- Commands: Danish militia Royal Horse Guards
- Conflicts: Napoleonic Wars; Battle of Køge

Lieutenant-General Joachim Melchior Holten von Castenschiold (29 November 1743 – 6 April 1817) was a Danish army officer and landowner who served in the French Revolutionary and Napoleonic Wars. Castenschiold purchased Borreby Castle in 1783, the estate of which has been owned by the family ever since.

== Biography ==
He was son of slaveholding planter Johan Lorentz Castenschiold and his wife Jacoba von Holten. In 1760, Castenschiold enlisted in the Danish army as an officer at the Schleswig Cuirassier Regiment, and was eventually promoted to the rank of major in 1776. He became commander of the Royal Horse Guards in 1784 (the regiment was eventually discontinued in 1866). He was promoted further, becoming major general in 1788, and finally lieutenant general in 1802.

In 1772, Castenschiold became involved in the coup d'état against Count Struensee. Because of Queen Caroline Matilda's dislike of Castenschiold, he was chosen to escort her to Kronborg together with 30 dragoons after she was arrested.

In 1807, Castenschiold led the East Danish (mainly Zealandic) territorial force, which was established to defend Denmark during the Napoleonic Wars. His efforts culminated in the Battle of Køge on 29 August 1807, where Castenschiold's force of around 7,000 militiamen was defeated by well-equipped British forces under General Arthur Wellesley (later 1st Duke of Wellington). Castenschiold was later prosecuted together with the other military leaders in Copenhagen, but was acquitted.

== Personal life ==
He was part of the landed gentry. In 1781, when he was in his late thirties, he married Elisabeth Behagen. His holdings included the manor Borreby Castle which has been owned by his descendants ever since. He died on 6 April 1817 at Borreby and is buried at Magleby Church.

== In popular culture ==
Castenschiold appears as a character in Bernard Cornwell's 2001 novel Sharpe's Prey and in Jacques Sudre's novel 'L'Eléphant Blanc, Une aventure du colonel de Sallanches'
