= Horslunde Church =

Horslunde Church Horslunde Kirke
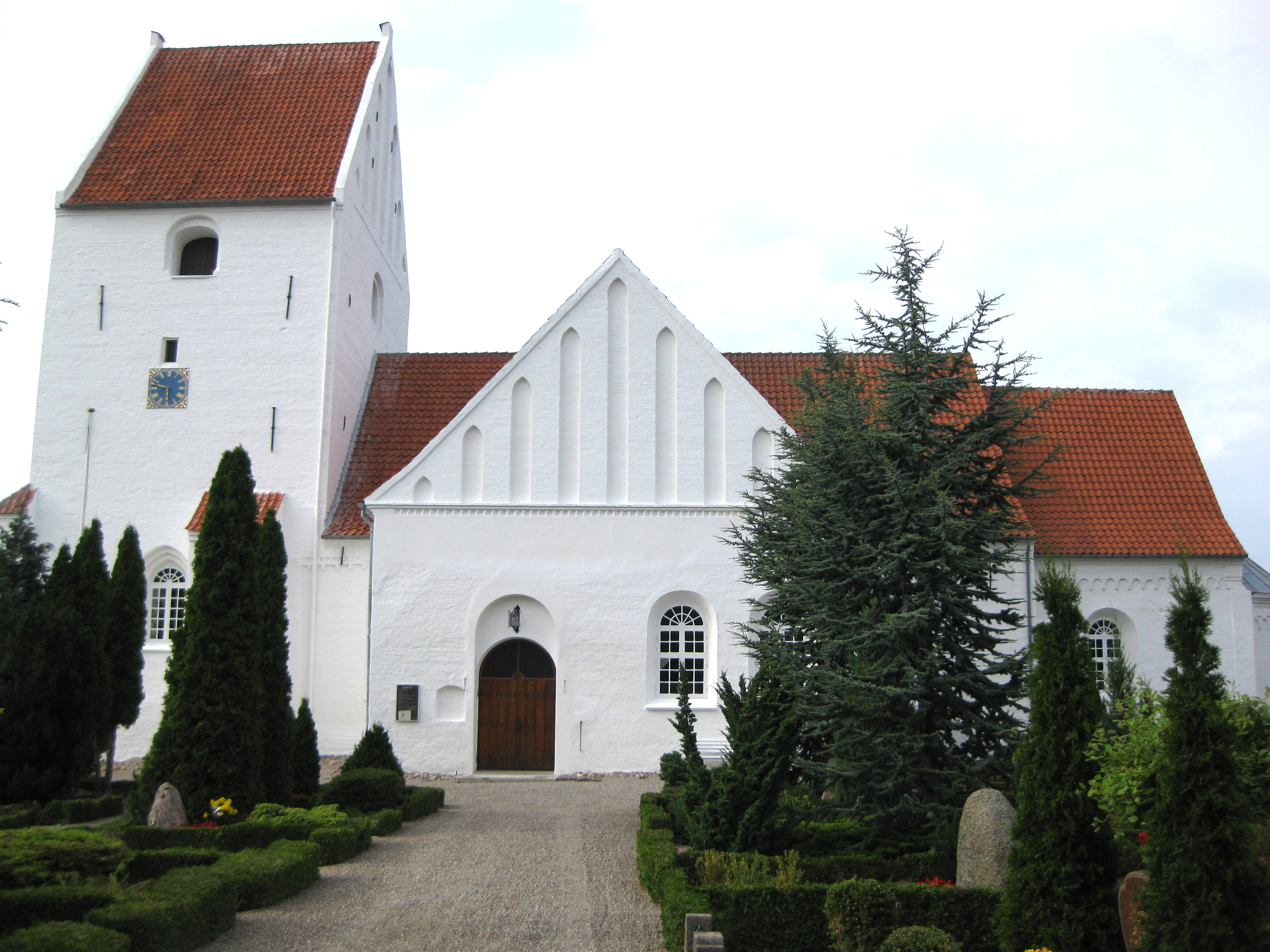
- Horslunde Church
- Horslunde Church; Horslunde Kirke
- 54°54′30″N 11°12′59″E
- Location: Horslunde
- Country: Denmark
- Denomination: Church of Denmark

History
- Founded: 12th century
- Dedication: St. Hans

Architecture
- Functional status: Functional

Horslunde Church (Danish: Horslunde Kirke) is a Church of Denmark parish church located in the village of Horslunde, on the island of Lolland, in southeastern Denmark. The altarpiece and the pulpit date from 1594. Former Danish prime minister, Christian Ditlev Frederik Reventlow is buried in the churchyard.

== History ==
The church was in Catholic times dedicated to Saint lians. In 1379, Guds Legems Tjeneste in Horslunde Church is mentioned. Nothing is known about its ownership in the Middle Ages apart from the fact that the Crown had appointment rights already prior to the Reformation. In 1686, it was presented to Peder Brandt of Pederstrup Manor.

In 1725, it came under the authority of the county of Christianssæde when it together with Pederstrup transferred to Christian Ditlev Reventlow. In 1819, Daniel Smith was appointed as parish priest of Horslunde-Nordlunde. In 1820, he was appointed as provost of Lollands Nørre Herred and in 1829 also of Lollands Søndre Herred. He maintained a close relationship with C. D. Reventlow. In 1834, he transferred to Stege on Møn.

On 1 April 1031, it gained its independence.

== Interior ==
Christian Ditlev Reventlow is buried inside the church. C.D.F. Reventlow, Frederik Reventlow, and Frederikke Charlotte Reventlow are interred in the surrounding graveyard.

== Churchyard ==
The surrounding churchyard is unusually large and has most likely been expanded in all directions.

Notable burials in the churchyard include:

- Christian Ditlev Frederik Reventlow (1748–1827), count and landowner
- Frederik Reventlow (1747–1822), diplomat
- Frederikke Charlotte Reventlow (1727–1952), countess and writer
- Christian Stolberg (1748–1821), district governor, writer and translator
- Louise Stolberg (1746–1824), saloniste, playwright and letter writer.
