= Martensrade =

- Municipality
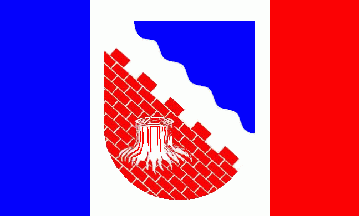
- Flag Coat of arms

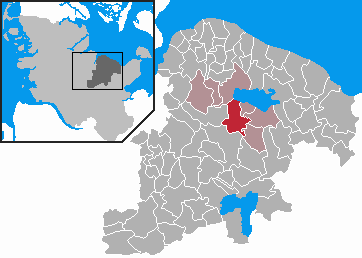
- Location of Martensrade within Plön district
- Interactive map of Martensrade
- Location within Germany Location within Schleswig-Holstein
- Coordinates: 54°16′N 10°24′E
- Country: Germany
- State: Schleswig-Holstein
- District: Plön
- Municipal assoc.: Selent/Schlesen

Government
  - Mayor: Ulrike Raabe

Area
  - Total: 19.53 km^{2} (7.54 sq mi)
- Elevation: 76 m (249 ft)

Population (2025-12-31)
  - Total: 935
  - Density: 47.9/km^{2} (124/sq mi)
- Time zone: UTC+01:00 (CET)
  - Summer (DST): UTC+02:00 (CEST)
- Postal codes: 24238
- Dialling codes: 04384
- Vehicle registration: PLÖ
- Website: www.amt-selent-schlesen.de

Martensrade is a municipality in the district of Plön, in Schleswig-Holstein, Germany.
