= Sandbjerg =

Manor house in Sønderborg Municipality, Denmark

Coordinates: 54°57′00″N 09°45′00″E

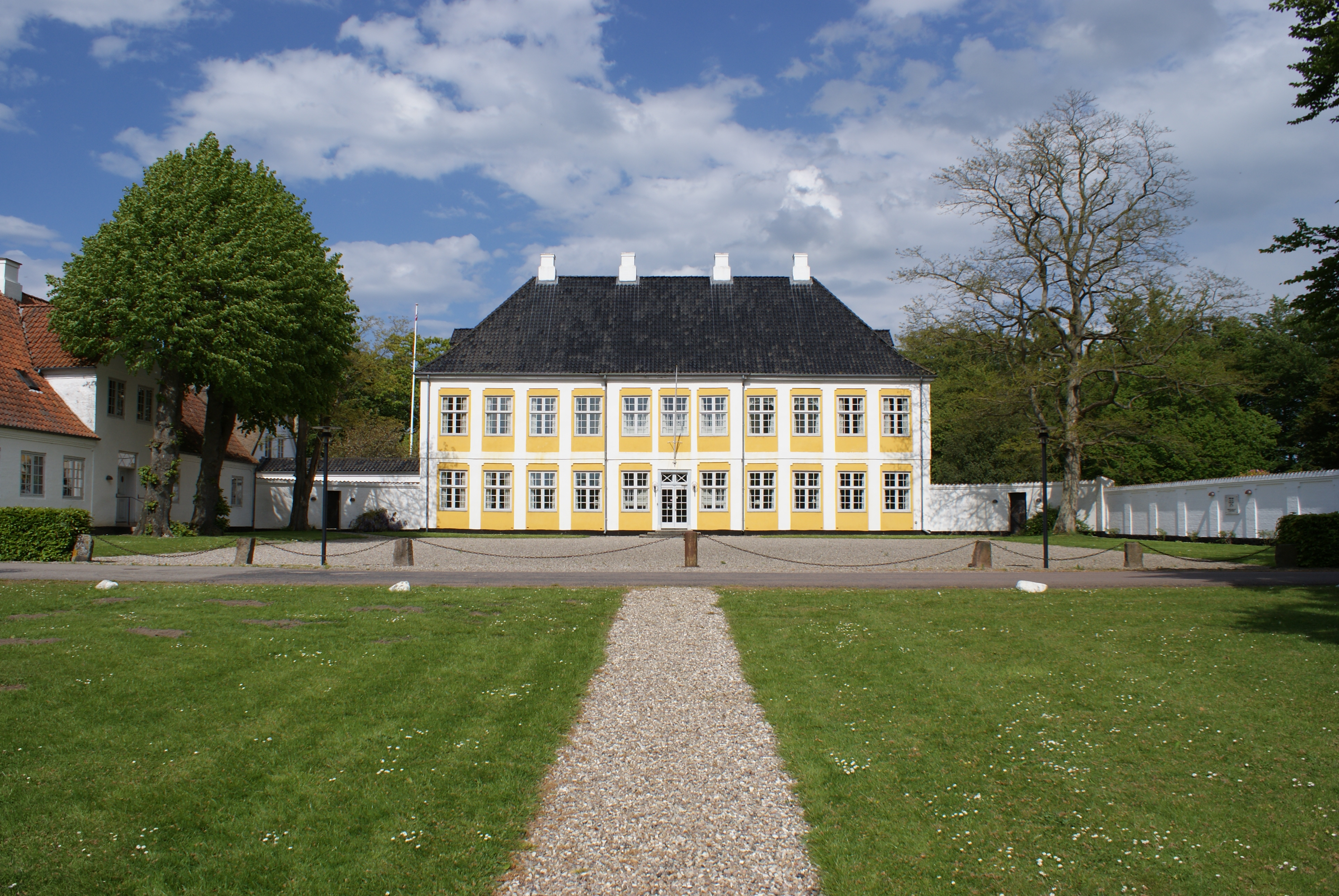
Sandbjerg Manor

Sandbjerg is a former estate and manor house 5 km (3.1 mi) north of Sønderborg in the southeast of Jutland, Denmark. The estate dates from 1571, but today's house was built in 1788. Since 1959, the estate has been used by Aarhus University for teaching and research. Today it is the university's conference centre.

== History ==
Sandbjerg is mentioned for the first time around 1500. In 1564, King Frederick II transferred a third of his properties, including Sandbjerg, to his brother John II, Duke of Schleswig-Holstein-Sonderburg. It remained in the hands of the House of Sonderburg until Christian Adolf's bankruptcy in 1667, when it was returned to the Crown. In 1668 it was sold to the statesman Conrad Reventlow, who established the fiefdom of Reventlow-Sandbjerg. In 1788, Conrad Georg Reventlow (1749–1815) commissioned Christian August Bohlsmann to build a mansion overlooking the Alssund on the east side of Mølle Sø. The park and the tenancy buildings and the mansion now form the Sandbjerg Estate. After retiring from the navy in 1795, Reventlow spent extended periods at Sandbjerg where he enjoyed good food and drink prepared by his French chef, Charles Maton. Among his guests were the poets Jens Baggesen and Adam Oehlenschläger.

In the 1850s, General Frederk Bülow who was victorious at the Battle of Fredericia in 1849, spent several summers on the estate, where he died in 1858. The last of the Reventlows died in 1929. In 1930 the estate was sold to Knud Dahl, a lawyer, and his wife Ellen, Karen Blixen's sister. After her husband died 1945, Ellen Dahl opened the residence to cultural and scientific figures and, in 1954, gave it to Aarhus University. On her death in 1959, the university took full possession of the estate.

== Mansion ==
The two-storey Rococo mansion completed in 1788 is a listed building. With a lesene-decorated facade and tall hipped roof, its rooms include a library, dining room and conservatory and three historic bedrooms.

== Literature ==
- Rasmussen, Søren (2004). Sandbjerg mellem Sø og Sund: strejftog i historie, kultur og natur. Aarhus Universitetsforlag. ISBN 978-87-7288-909-2., in Danish
