= Frederikke Charlotte Reventlow =

Danish countess and writer (1747–1822)

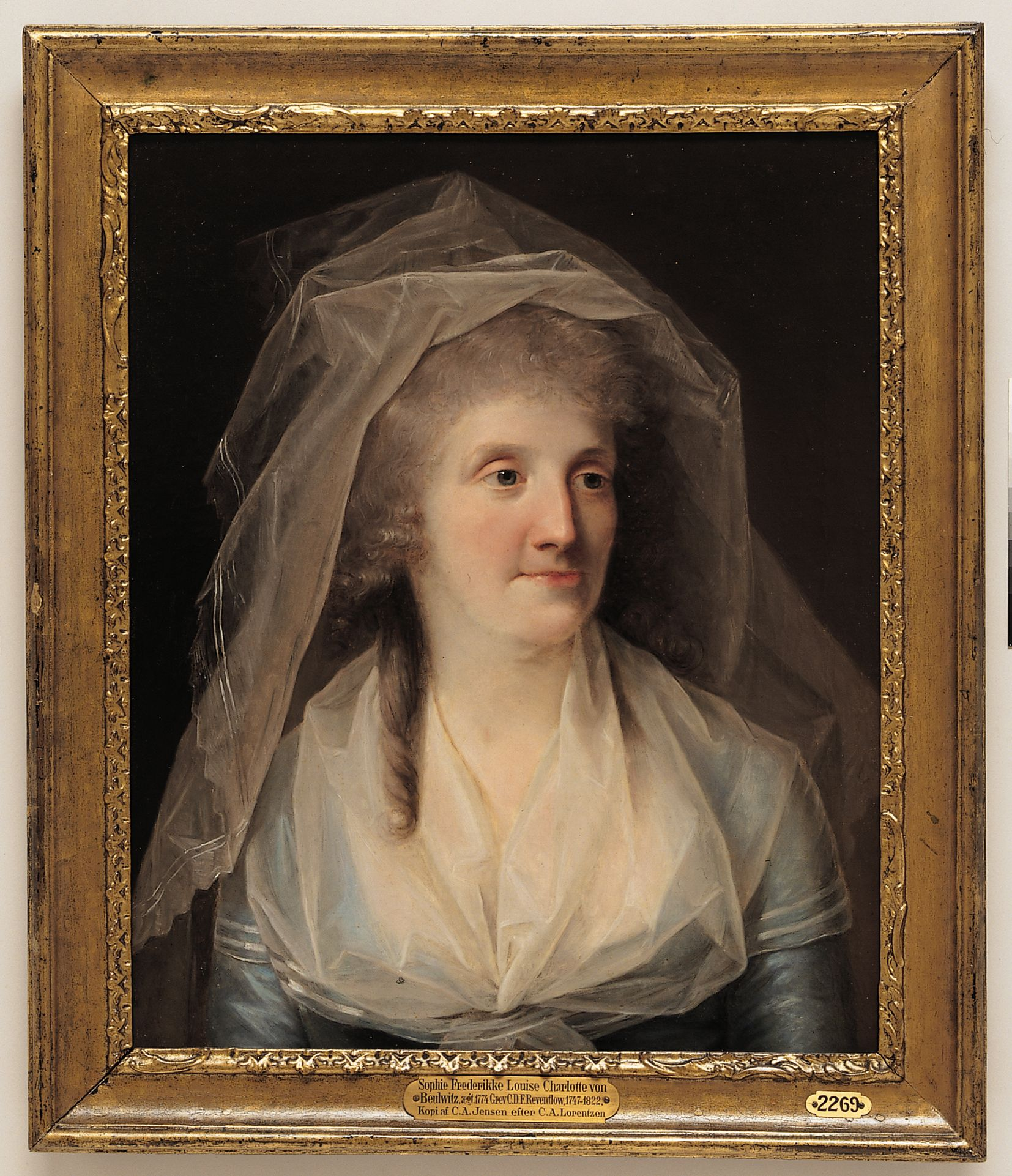
Frederikke Charlotte Reventlow, portrait copied by C.A. Jensen from C.A. Lorentzen's original

Sophie Frederikke Louise Charlotte Reventlow née von Beulwitz or von Beulwiz (1747–1822) was a Danish countess, author and letter writer. She contributed to improvements in children's education and upbringing and, encouraged by her husband, the statesman Christian Ditlev Frederik Reventlow, published an account of her children's upbringing in Vore opblomstrende Børn (Our Flourishing Children) which she had compiled as her large family developed in the 1770s and 1780s. Her correspondence, which has been preserved, reveals much about her concerns and feelings.

== Biography ==
Born on 1 June 1747 in Oldenburg, Sophie Frederikke Louise Charlotte von Beulwitz was the daughter of the Royal Councilor Christoph Ernst von Beulwitz (1695–1757) and his wife Sophie Hedevig née von Warnstedt (1707–1768). In June 1774, she married Lengreve Christian Ditlev Frederik Reventlow (1748–1827), They had 12 children together, nine of whom reached adulthood. Frederikke Charlotte had an older half-sister, Charlotte Augusta Johanne Eberhardine von Beulwitz (1734–1786), and a younger brother, Gottlob Frederik von Beulwitz (1750–1811).

Frederikke Charlotte was raised in Sorø where her father, originally from Oldenburg, had headed the re-establishment of the academy. After his death in 1757, the family lived in rather difficult conditions in Sorø where she received a German education. Frederikke Charlotte moved to Vallø Castle in 1769 where she became a Diocesan lady.

She enjoyed a successful marriage with Christian Reventlow, raising 12 children, nine of whom reached adulthood. They nevertheless were beset with financial problems and debt, spending their summers in Pederstrup on the island of Lolland and living in their modest Copenhagen home in Amaliegade in the winter. They concentrated on raising their family in accordance with their Christian beliefs.

Reventlow's letters to her sister-in-law Louis Stolberg show she tired of social life and was concerned about her many births and her children's illnesses. She was seriously affected by the deaths of her five-year-old son Ernst and her "angel" Conrad who died when he was just two weeks old.

Encouraged by her husband, in the late 1770s and early 1880s, she wrote a diary recording the births of her children and their early upbringing. It was not published until 1990 when, translated from the original German, it appeared in Danish as Vore opblomstrende Børn (Our Flourishing Children).

Frederikke Charlotte Reventlow died on 26 July 1822 on the Pederstrup estate near Nakskov. She was buried in Horslunde Churchyard.
