= Timm =

Timm is a given name and a surname. As a given name, it is a variant of Tim, and as an English surname, it is probably from an Old English personal name cognate with Germanic Timmo.

Notable people with the name include:

== Given name ==
- Timm Golley (born 1991), German footballer
- Timm van der Gugten (born 1991), Dutch cricketer
- Timm Herzbruch (born 1997), German field hockey player
- Timm Kern (born 1972), German politician
- Timm Klose (born 1988), Swiss footballer
- Timm Kröger (born 1985), German director, screenwriter and cinematographer
- Timm Ormsby (born 1959), American politician
- Timm Peddie (born 1970), American racing cyclist
- Timm Rosenbach (born 1966), American football player and coach
- Timm Sharp (born 1978), American actor and writer
- Timm Stade (born 1968), German windsurfer

== Surname ==
- Bruce Timm (born 1961), American artist, character designer, animator
- Bruno Timm (1902–1972), German cinematographer
- Cap Timm (1908–1987), American baseball coach
- Christian Timm (born 1979), German former professional footballer
- Christopher Timm (born 1968), English cricketer
- Claudia Timm (born 1973), German tennis player
- Cole Timm (born 1998), American racing driver
- David Timm (born 1969), German pianist and choir director
- Doug Timm (1960–1989), American composer
- Emilie Timm (1821–1877), Baltic German pianist
- Erich Timm (politician), (1884–1968) German politician, and member of the Reichstag for the German National People's Party
- Erika Timm (born 1934), German linguist
- Ernst Timm (1926–2005), German politician
- Georg Wilhelm Timm (1820–1895), Russian painter
- Heinrich Timm (1910–1974), German commander
- Helga Timm (1924–2014), German politician
- Henry Christian Timm (1811–1892), Musical artist
- Joachim Christian Timm (1734–1805), German botanist
- Jud Timm (1906–1994), American football player and coach
- Jürnjakob Timm (born 1949), German classical cellist
- Kevin Bechmann Timm (born 1989), Danish footballer
- Mads Timm (born 1984), Danish footballer and coach
- Marián Timm (born 1990), Slovak footballer
- Michael Timm (1962–2025), German boxer
- Miguel Timm (born 1992), South African footballer
- Mike Timm (1937–2018), American politician
- Otto Timm (1893–1978), American stunt aviator
- Paul-Joachim Timm (born 1990), German politician
- Reinhold Timm (1616–1639), Danish painter
- Richard William Timm (1923–2020), American priest, educator, zoologist, and activist
- Robert D. Timm (1921–2016), American politician
- Tarmo Timm (born 1936), Estonian zoologist
- Uwe Timm (born 1940), German writer
- Uwe Timm (libertarian author) (1932–2014), German anarchist
- Wally Timm (1896–1978), American aircraft engineer

== See also ==
- Timms, a surname
