= Gert van Egen =

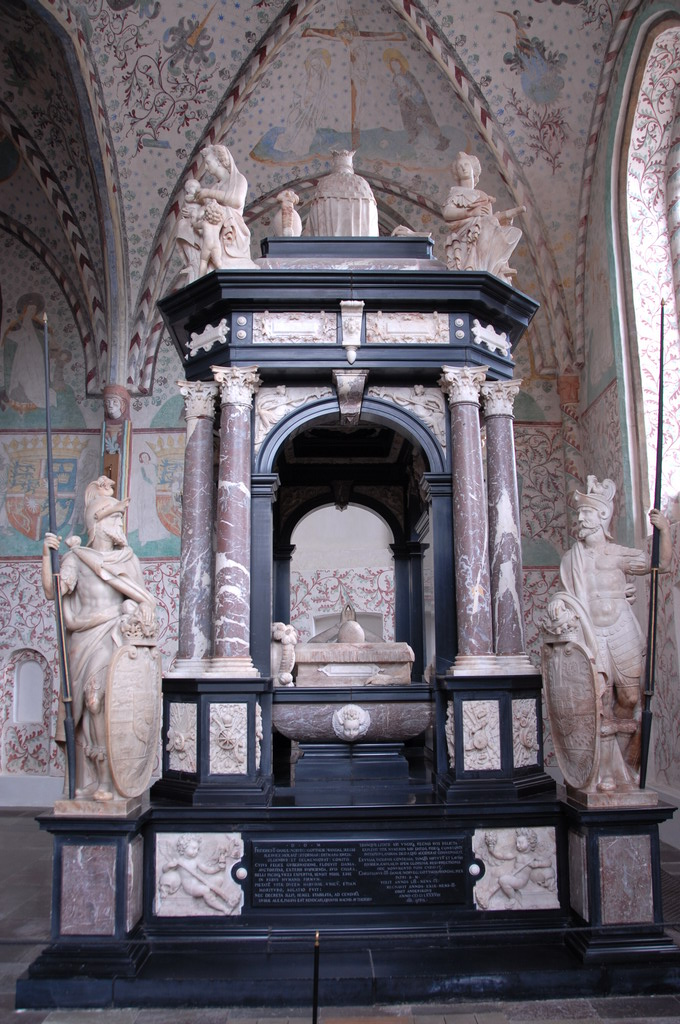
Monument to king Frederick II and Queen Sophie in Roskilde Cathedral, 1598

Gert van Egen (I) (alternative names: Gert va Egerem, Gert van Eggernn) (Mechelen, c. 1550 – Elsinore, 1612) was a Flemish sculptor who became a sculptor working for the Royal Danish Court.

== Life ==
Little is known about his life. He was likely trained in Mechelen and was later a pupil or assistant in the Antwerp workshop of Cornelis Floris de Vriendt whose work was particularly popular in Northern Europe. He was part of a group of pupils and assistants of Cornelis Floris, who moved to countries situated on the Baltic Sea to take advantage of Floris’ network and the international popularity of the Floris style. The Baltic region was at the time politically relatively stable when compared to van Egen's native home, the Spanish Netherlands, which were rife with religious persecution. There was also less competition from other artists in these countries.

He was employed, together with his brother Peter, in Denmark at Kronborg Castle from 1578 to 1585. The principal architects of Kronborg Castle were his fellow Flemings Hans Hendrik van Paesschen and Anthonis van Obbergen, whereas the sculptural work was coordinated by Dutchman Gert van Groningen. At this time king Frederick II of Denmark had the medieval fortress radically transformed into a magnificent Renaissance castle. Van Egen was one of the best paid sculptors, indicating that he had important responsibilities in the decoration of Kronborg, although there are no records as to what these were. While his brother Peter likely left with van Obbergen for Danzig upon completion of the work at Kronborg Castle, Gert stayed on in Denmark to work for the Danish royal family.

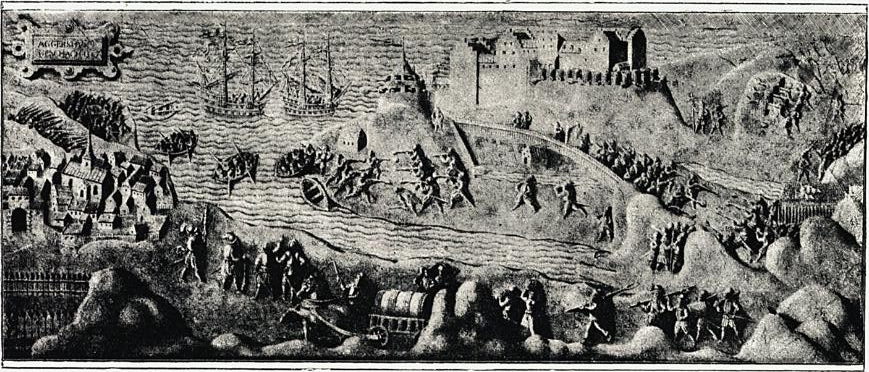
Relief from Frederick II's tomb showing the siege of Akershus Fortress in 1567. Bottom left: Oslo with St. Hallvard's Cathedral

Frederick II died in 1588 and a year later Gert van Egen was commissioned to make a monumental tomb of the king to be placed in Roskilde Cathedral. The initiative came from the deceased king's son Christian IV and widow, Dowager Queen Sophie.

Van Egen remained in the employ of the Danish court for the rest of his life and raised a family in Denmark.

== Work ==
Unlike some of his fellow Flemings working in the Baltic, van Egen not only worked on large monuments, but he also produced small-scale works.

=== Monuments ===
The major documented monumental work that he worked on was the tomb for Frederick II in Roskilde Cathedral. The instructions for the design of the tomb were that it should form a unity with the tomb of king Christian III, designed by Floris, that was already placed in the Cathedral. It has been suggested that the design for the tomb was by the hand of the sculptor Johan Gregor van der Schardt who was at the time probably working in Denmark. Of particular interest are the reliefs on the sides of the monument. They depict scenes from the king's campaign against Dithmarschen in 1559 and from the Northern Seven Years' War that lasted from 1563 to 1570. One scene shows the siege of Akershus Fortress in Oslo of 1567. Van Egen shows a virtuoso technique in the details of this work. The figure of the reclining king on the tomb is also sculpted with precision.

=== Small-scale work ===
In addition to the large-scale tomb of Frederick II, it is recorded that in 1600 van Egen delivered to Christian IV a closet with alabaster pieces. Probably he has also made some small portrait reliefs of Frederick II now at Rosenborg and the Nationalmuseum in Stockholm and a few similar alabaster works of Danish noblemen. Of the small-scale works four are still known to be extant. There are two alabaster statuettes both signed with his initials: GE. One represents Judith holding the head of Holofernes and is now in a private collection in New York. The other representing Mercury is in the collection of the Metropolitan Museum in New York City. These pieces demonstrate that Van Egen likely received his training primarily in Mechelen, the center of alabaster small-scale sculpture.
