= Tims (surname) =

Tims is a surname, and may refer to:

- Desiree Tims, American politician
- Frank Fraser Tims (1856–1949), Canadian politician
- Ian Tims (born 1979), Irish boxer
- John Tims (1857–1945), Canadian Anglican archdeacon
- Lesley Tims, birth name of Mahogany L. Browne, American poet
- Michael Tims (born 1931), British courtier
- Syd Tims (1914–1962), Australian rules footballer

== See also ==
- Timms, surname
- Timbs, surname
