= Hans Knieper =

Flemish artist (died 1587)

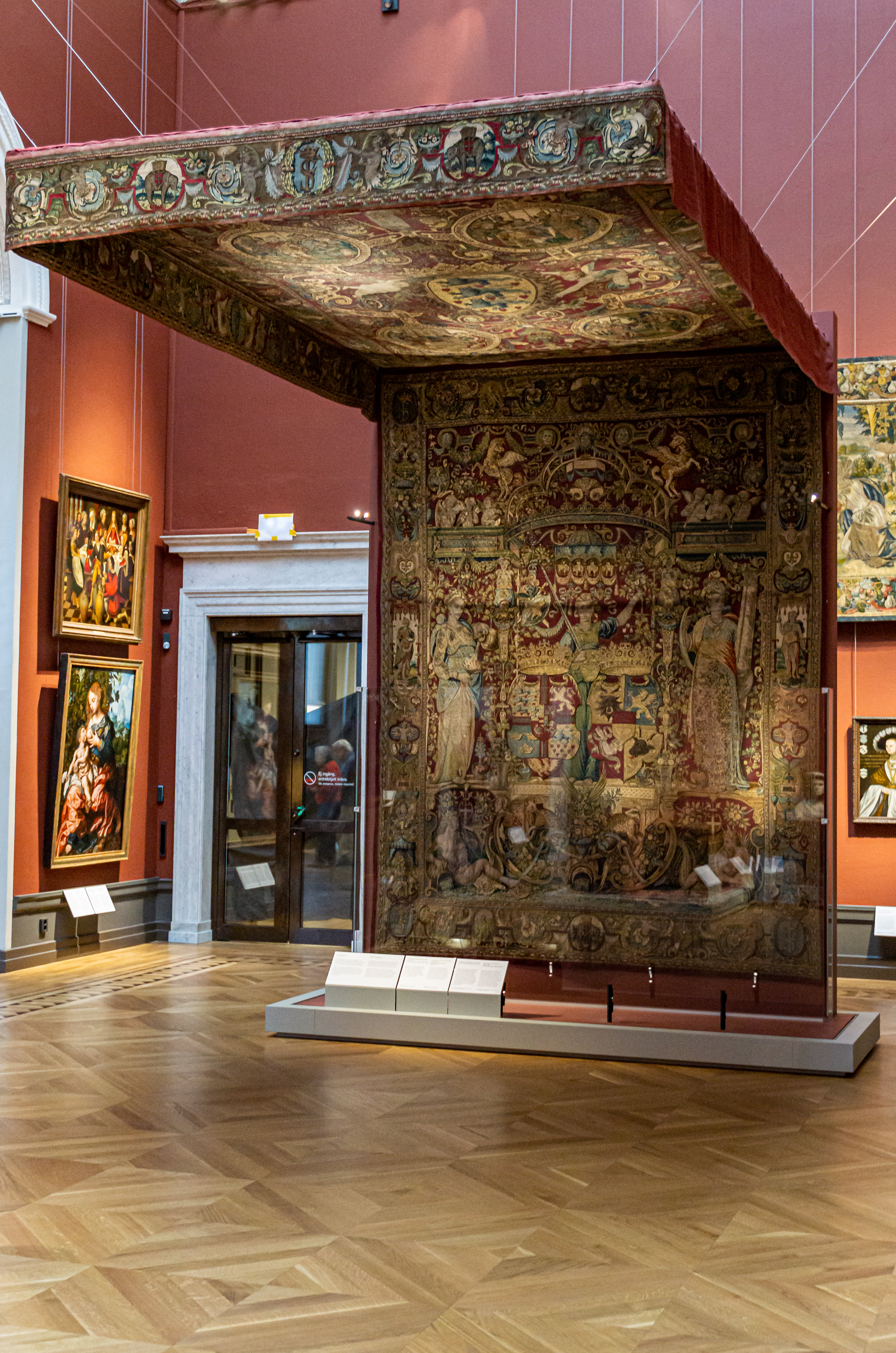
Frederick II's Throne Baldaquin.

Hans Knieper (alternative names: Hans Kniepper, Hans Knipper, Johan van Antwerpen, Hans Maler, Hans Knibber, Jan Knibber, signature: I. D. Knibber and monogram IDK) (probably Antwerp, ? – Elsinore, 2 November 1587) was a Flemish painter and draughtsman. He became a court painter and tapestry cartoon designer at the Royal Danish Court and ran a tapestry weaving shop in Denmark.

== Early life and training ==
Very little is known about Knieper's early life and training in Flanders. He was likely born in Antwerp, as he was referred to by the name 'Johannes de Antwerpia' in his initial contract with the Danish king. A training in Brussels has been proposed based on a possible link with the Brussels family of weavers de Smet and the fact that he added a mark composed of a crown and a B to the tapestries that he designed for Kronborg Castle in Denmark. The B mark was a famous mark of a Brussels weaving workshop. The only work attributed to him in his home country is a watercolour of an allegorical figure now in Gaasbeek in Belgium.

== In Denmark ==
=== Kronborg Castle ===
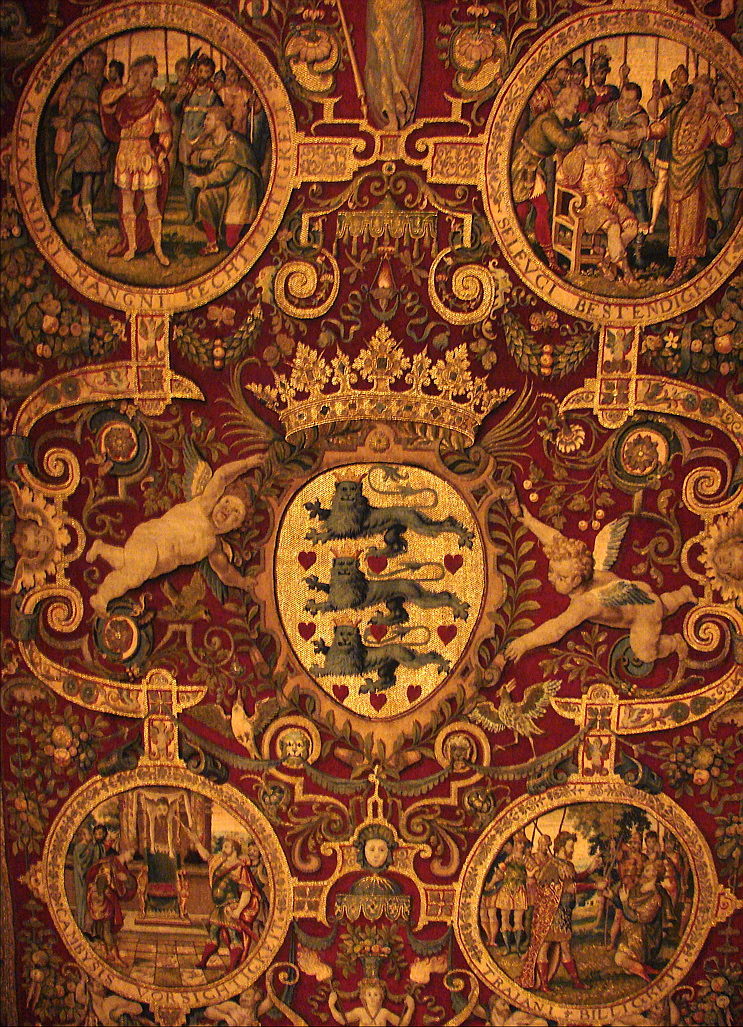
Detail of the Throne Baldaquin

Knieper must have had quite an international reputation as an artist since the Danish king Frederick II's envoy Thomas Tenniker engaged him in 1577 on the king's behalf to go to Helsingør to design tapestries for the decoration of Kronborg Castle. At the time king Frederick II was transforming the medieval fortress radically into a magnificent Renaissance castle, using as principal architects Knieper's fellow Flemings Hans Hendrik van Paesschen and Anthonis van Obbergen. Rather than decorating the castle by importing finished artworks, Frederick decided to invite artists to produce their work in situ.

Knieper arrived in Kronborg in the company of the Flemish master weaver Anthonius de Goech (or the Corte or de Gorth). Anthonius de Goech brought all the materials to execute the tapestries with him but died within three months of his arrival (eight months after his appointment). Knieper was then given the post of director of the weaving workshop. He travelled back and forth between Denmark and Flanders to import further materials and skilled workers. He managed to establish a high-quality workshop near Kronborg Castle which had about 20 weavers and executed many works for the king. He probably appointed another master weaver to manage the actual weaving work in the shop.

=== First tapestries ===
As early as 1579 his workshop was able to deliver twelve tapestries with the Old Testament story of David and Nebuchadnezzar and a single tapestry with the story of Susanna and Daniel, none of which have survived. He delivered in the same year a further five tapestries of the Susanna series and two more Daniels. It has been speculated that between 1579 and 1581 the weaving activities ceased. It is not clear whether the Flemish weavers returned to their home country.

In this period, Knieper continued to work as the royal painter. He made paintings for the king's chamber (the story of Gideon) and other rooms as well as the altarpiece for the castle's chapel. Knieper was also responsible for the maintenance and preservation of the castle's tapestries.

=== The genealogy ===
In 1581 Frederick II commissioned Knieper's weaving workshop to design and weave a tapestry series of the Danish royal genealogy which would include 111 former Danish kings, as well as the king himself and the Crown Prince Christian III, and of some tapestries of hunting scenes. A similar Swedish tapestry cycle with no less than 143 kings had already been planned in 1560 by the Swedish king Erik XIV. In Denmark, the Swedish artist Antonius Samfleth had painted in 1574 a painted royal series totaling 117 portraits Knieper produced designs for 40 tapestries of the genealogy in 1584 that covered the entire walls of the ballroom at Kronborg Castle. Of these 14 still survive.

Behind the life-size portraits Knieper created a background, with castles and forests, animals and plush vegetation, allegorical profundities, heraldic expressions and ornamentation of an elegance and brilliance.

=== The Throne Baldaquin ===
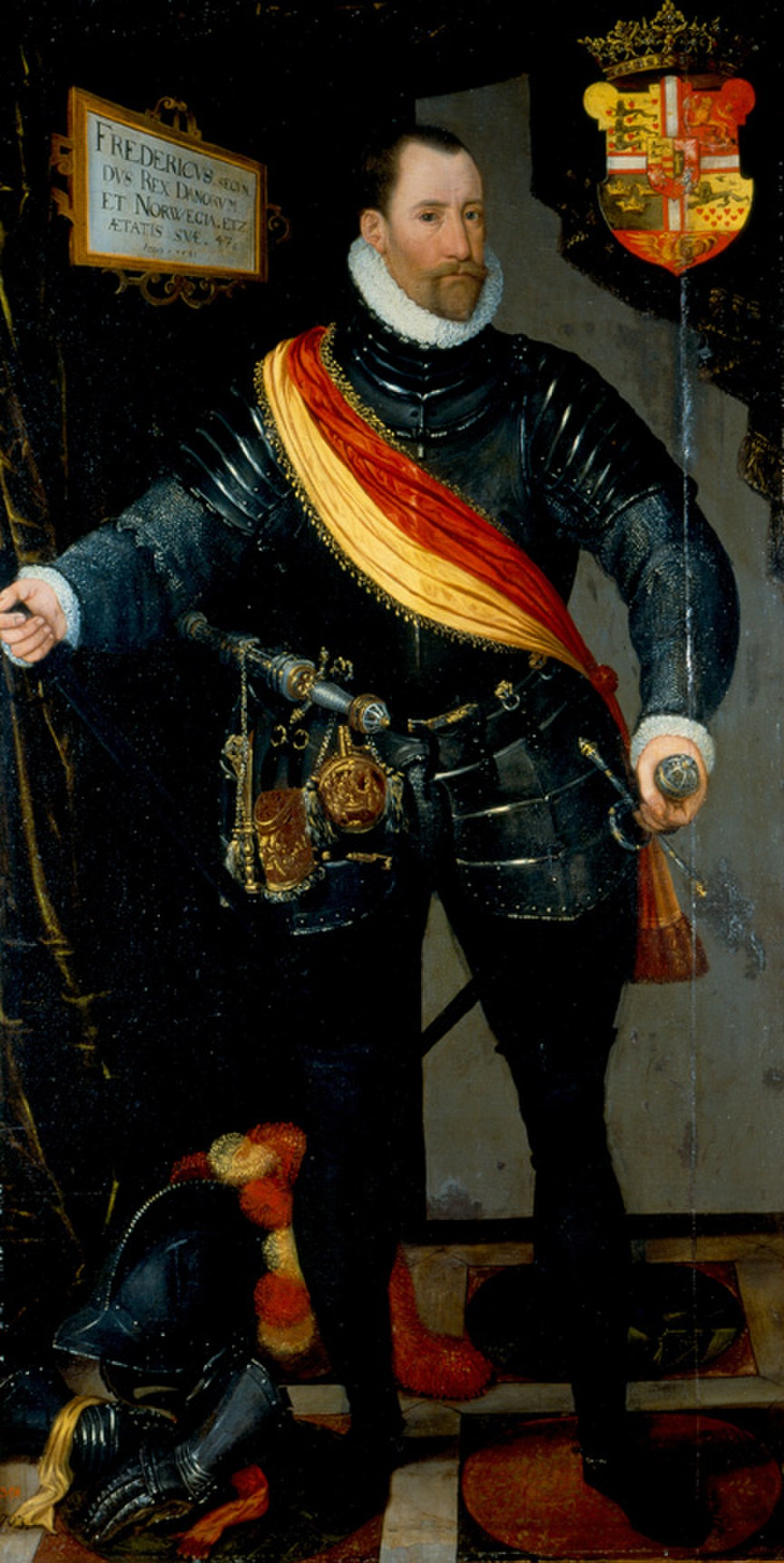
Portrait of Frederick II, 1581

When this series was completed in 1585, the king commissioned Knieper to make the Throne Baldaquin. The Throne Baldaquin was made of 8 separate tapestry pieces which were woven with silver, gold and silk. It was intended to hang above the heads of the king and queen when they sat at the head of the banquet table. Its rich materials and distinguished and refined style make it probably Northern Europe's most beautiful piece of fabric. It was completed in 1586 and was in 1659 taken by the Swedes as war loot after they sacked Kronborg. It remained in the Swedish royal family until after Karl XV's death it was transferred to the State and is now in the Nationalmuseum in Stockholm.

=== Portrait painting ===
Knieper is said to have revived Danish portrait painting. Portraits of king Frederick II, the queen Sophie, the queen's father, the Duke Ulrich III of Mecklenburg-Güstrow, and the crown prince Christian have been attributed to him. Knieper's portrait painting and in particular the portrait of Frederick II represent a break with the domestic portrait tradition. It is the oldest known full-length profane portrait that is furthermore set into a three-dimensional pictorial space.

=== Painting for Tycho Brahe ===
The famous Danish astronomer Tycho Brahe invited Knieper in 1587 to come to the island Hven that he had received as a gift from king Frederick II. In Uraniborg observatory on the island Brahe had built an astronomical instrument called the mural quadrant that consisted of an arch attached to a wall. Brahe commissioned three artists to make a mural painting above the arch. Hans Knieper painted the landscape at the top, Hans van Steenwinckel the Elder painted the three arches representing the three areas of Uraniborg and Tobias Gemperle painted the portrait of Brahe.

Knieper married Marine Johansen who survived him.
