= Timbs =

Timbs is a surname, and may refer to:

- John Timbs (1801–1875), British journalist
- Ken Timbs (1951–2004), American professional wrestler
- Maurice Timbs (1917–1994), Australian public servant

== See also ==
- Timbs v. Indiana, a United States Supreme Court case
- Tims (surname)
- Timms, a surname
- Timberland (company)
