= Tymms =

Tymms is a surname. Notable people with the surname include:

- Athol Tymms (1886–1949), Australian rules footballer
- Bill Tymms (1903–1989), Australian rules footballer
- Samuel Tymms (1808–1871), English antiquarian

== See also ==
- Timms
