= Willem van den Blocke =

Flemish artist (1550–1628)

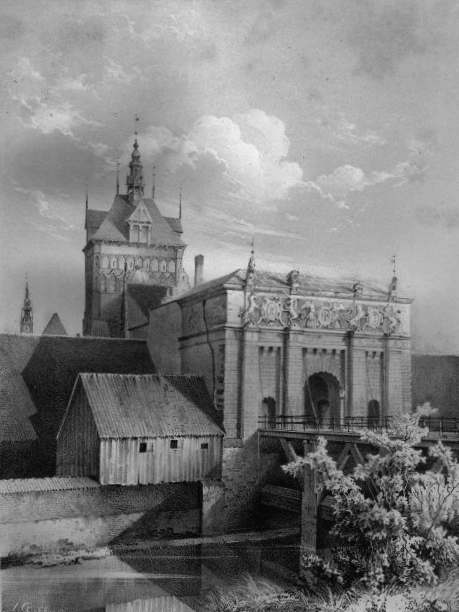
The High Gate in Danzig before the removal of the walls (drawing by Julius Greth, 1855)

Willem van den Blocke (Note: Alternative names: Willem van den Block, Willem van den Bloocke, Wilhelm von dem Block, Wilhelm von dem Blocke, Wilhem van Block) (c. 1550 – 1628) was a sculptor and architect of Flemish descent who was active in the Baltics and worked in a mannerist style.

== Biography ==
He was born in Mechelen, the son of Franciscus van den Blocke, who was also a sculptor. Willem received his first training in the art of stone carving and sculpting in his father's workshop in Mechelen. He then likely moved for further training to the workshop of Cornelis Floris de Vriendt in Antwerp.

In 1569, he went to Königsberg (Kaliningrad). He was part of a group of pupils and assistants of Cornelis Floris, which included Gert van Egen, Robert Coppens and Philips Brandin, who moved to the Baltic region to take advantage of Floris’ network and the international popularity of the Floris style. The Baltic region was at the time politically relatively stable when compared to Willem's native home, the Spanish Netherlands, which were rife with religious persecution. The van Block family were Mennonites and were particularly vulnerable to such persecution in their home country. In the Baltics, there was also less competition from other artists.

In Konigsberg van den Blocke worked on the monumental tomb of Albert, Duke in Prussia, designed by Floris, in the local cathedral. In 1581 he designed and executed the tomb of princess Elizabeth, the first wife of George Frederick, Margrave of Brandenburg-Ansbach, also in the Königsberg Cathedral.

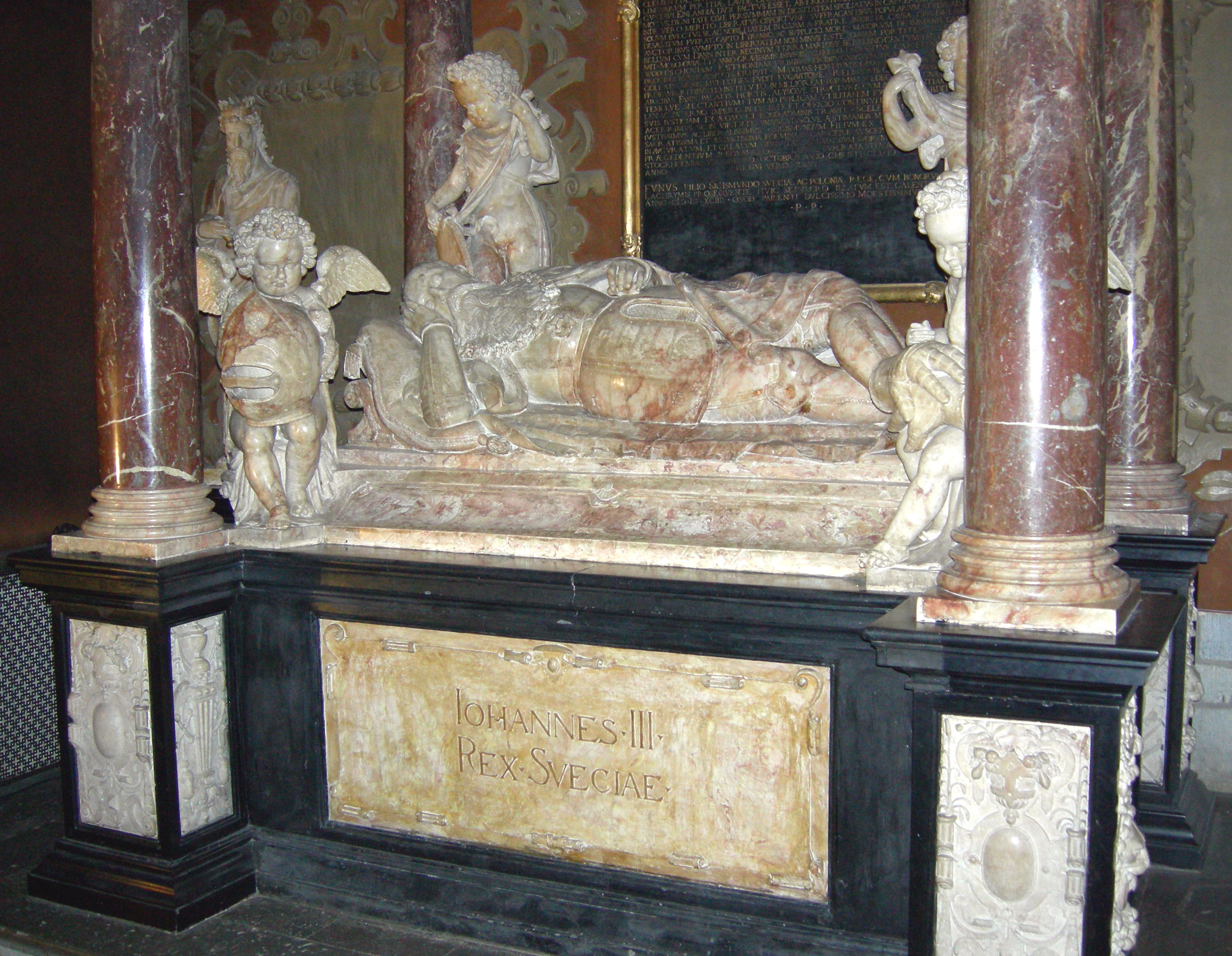
Uppsala Cathedral, tomb of King John III of Sweden

After 14 years of service to the Margrave, he received a recommendation letter and then went to work in Poland. He received many commissions such as the design and execution of the tomb of Christopher Báthory, brother of the King of Poland Stephen Báthory. He completed this commission from 1581 to 1583 in Wartenburg (Barczewo).

In early 1584, he went to Gyulafehérvár in Transylvania to install in the local church a tomb he had created.

Willem van den Blocke moved on 18 June 1584 to Danzig (Gdańsk), the center of the Vistula delta Mennonites, carrying with him a recommendation by Stephen Báthory, the king of Poland. As he was in royal employ, he did not have to join the local guild. He ran a workshop in Danzig until his death His most important work in Danzig was the design of one of the gates in the city walls, called the High Gate (completed in 1588). He also created numerous epitaphs and tombs. He also designed the facades of town houses in Danzig, Toruń (Thorn) and Elbing (Elbląg).

His son Abraham van den Blocke was also an architect and sculptor, whereas his sons Jacob van den Blocke, Isaak van den Blocke and David van den Blocke were painters. Van den Blocke died in Danzig in the same year as his sons Abraham and Isaac, likely from an infectious disease.

== Work ==
Willem van den Blocke is regarded as the main representative in the Baltics of Italianizing Flemish mannerism as developed first by Cornelis Floris. Although he designed many building ornaments, he is best known for his monuments. His monuments are characterized by their clarity and rich ornamentation. The deceased are presented realistically.

=== Known works ===
- Epitaph of Edward Blemke in the St. Mary's Church, 1591
- Tomb of the King John III of Sweden in Uppsala Cathedral (1593–1596), was until 1782 installed in the Great Armoury in Danzig, and re-assembled at the current location in 1817–1818
- Tomb of Ture Nilsson Bjelke and his wife Margaret Svantesdotter Sture in the Linköping Cathedral, c. 1615

=== Attributed Works (selection) ===
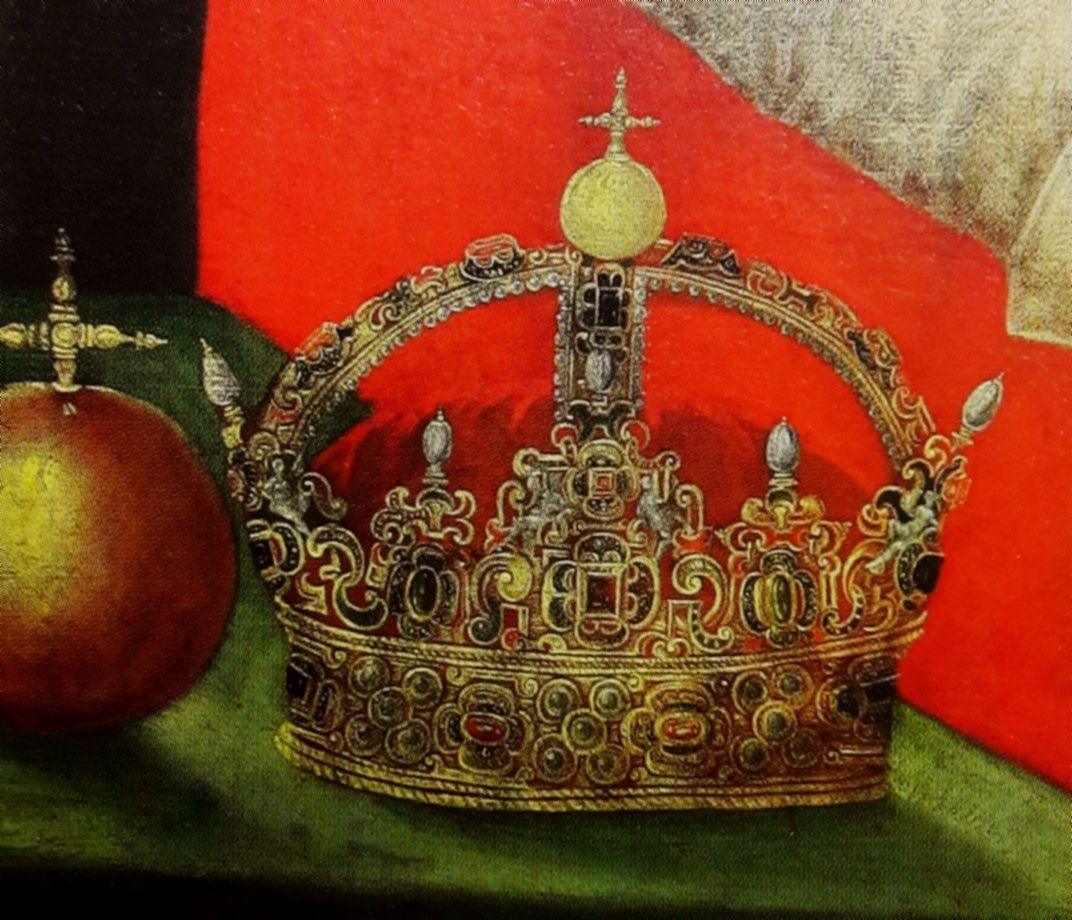
Mannerist crown most probably created for Stephen Báthory in Gdańsk after Willem van den Blocke's design in about 1584

==== Epitaphs ====
- Brandes family in the St. Mary's Church, Danzig, 1588
- Christoph von Dohna in St. Canute's Cathedral in Odense in Denmark, 1586
- Valentin Bodecker in the St. Nicholas Church in Elbing, 1587
- Family Stroband in the Church of the Assumption of the Blessed Virgin Mary in Toruń, 1590

==== Tombs ====
- Kos family in Oliwa Cathedral, 1600 or 1620
- Martin de Berzewice in Lisnowo near Brodnica, 1592 (destroyed 1939)
- Andreas and Balthasar Báthory in the St. Andrew's Church in Wartenburg, 1598
- Peter Tarnowski in the cathedral of Łowicz, after 1604
- Stanislaus Radziwill in the former Bernardine church in Vilnius, 1618–1623

==== Facades of houses ====
- Home of the Danzig St. George Archers (late 16th century)
- Esken house in Torun (1590)
