= Knieper =

Knieper is a surname. Notable people with the surname include:

- Hans Knieper (fl. c. 1577–1587), Flemish painter
- Jürgen Knieper (born 1941), German film score composer
- Werner Knieper (1909-1977), German politician and manager
