= Anthonis van Obbergen =

Flemish architect and engineer (1543–1611)

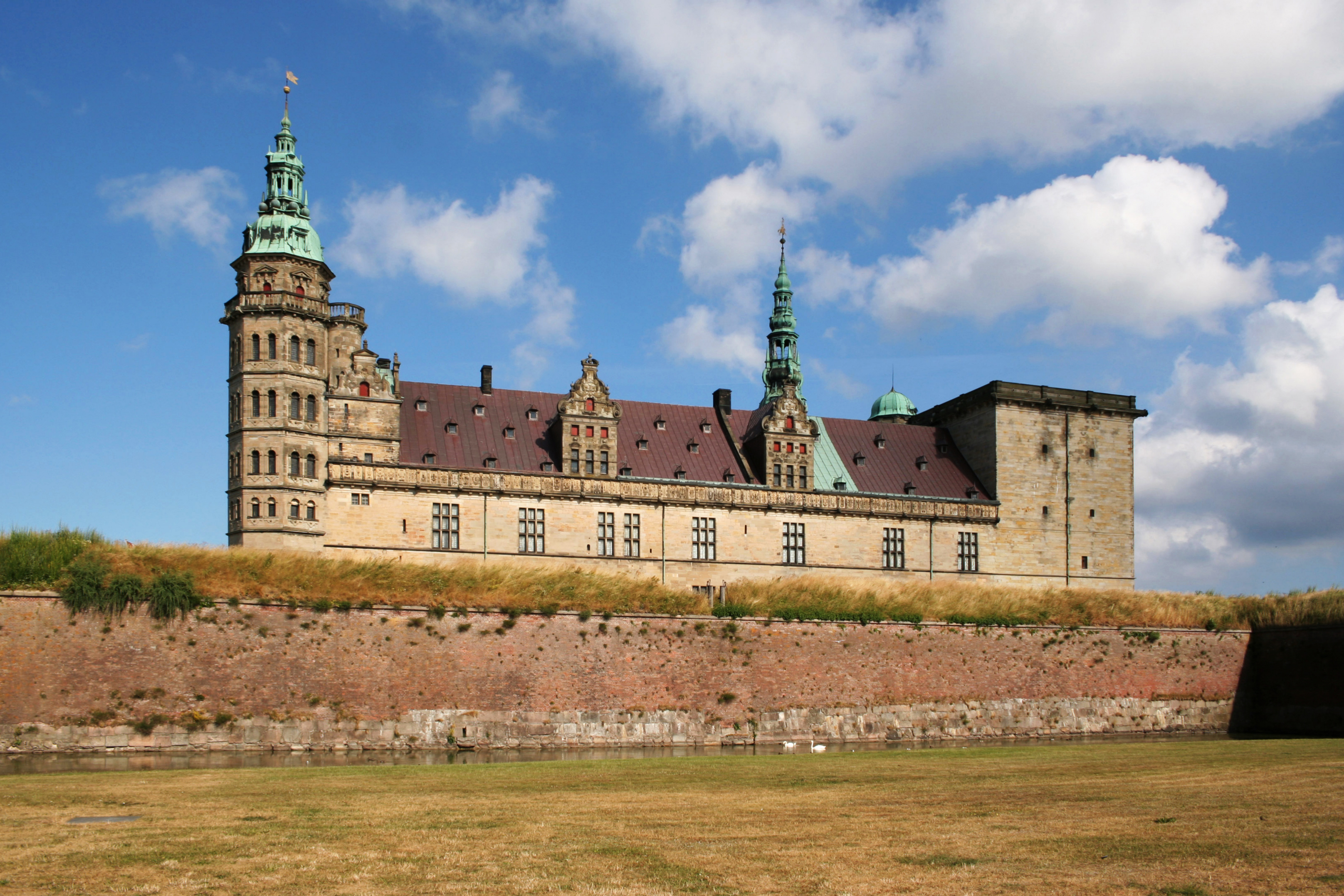
Kronborg Castle, Helsingør, Denmark

Anthonis van Obbergen (Antonius, Anthonis, Anthony, Antonie, Anton - Obberghen, Oberberg, Opbergen) (1543 in Mechelen – 1611 in Danzig (Gdańsk)) was a Flemish architect and fortifications engineer. After studying masonry in Mechelen and completing a tour to study fortification work in Germany, he initially gained experience working on the fortifications of Antwerp (1567–71). He later worked in Denmark and Poland where he designed fortifications as well as civilian homes.

== Achievements in Denmark ==
In Denmark, he is remembered for his exceptional work on the Royal Palace of Kronborg in Helsingør (1577–86) which he completed after another Flemish architect, Hans van Paeschen, resigned from the project in 1577. Inspired by the Flemish Renaissance style of Antwerp developed by Cornelis Floris, the building quickly gained international fame, both as an architecturally imposing building and as the largest castle in northern Europe. Although most of it was destroyed by fire in 1629, Christian IV had it rebuilt in accordance with van Obbergen's design. Today's castle has not changed substantially since that time.

In 1585, under Frederik II, van Obbergen replaced the tower of the Kullen Lighthouse in the Öresund. The area is now part of Sweden.

== Achievements in Poland ==
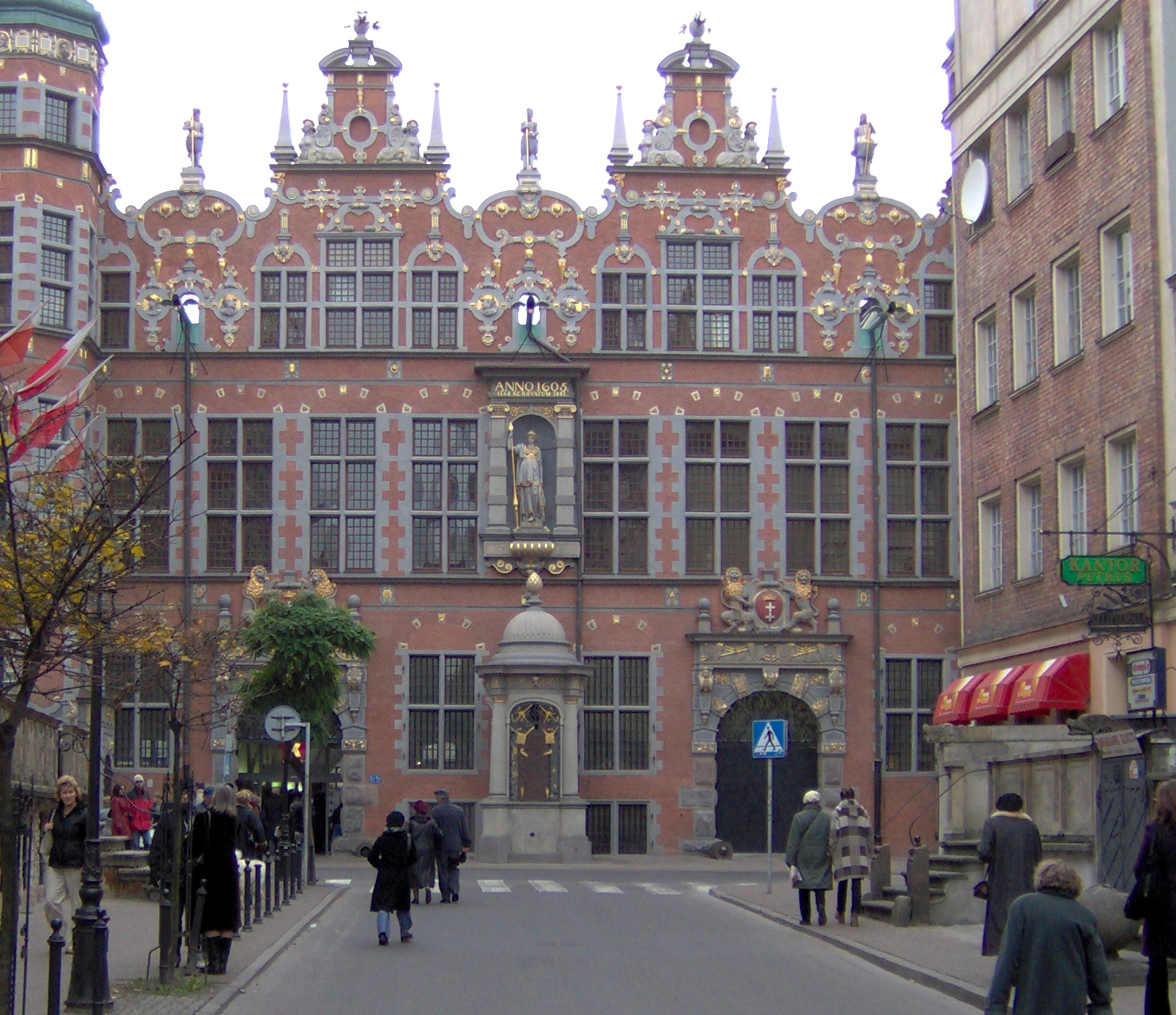
Old Arsenal, Gdańsk, Poland

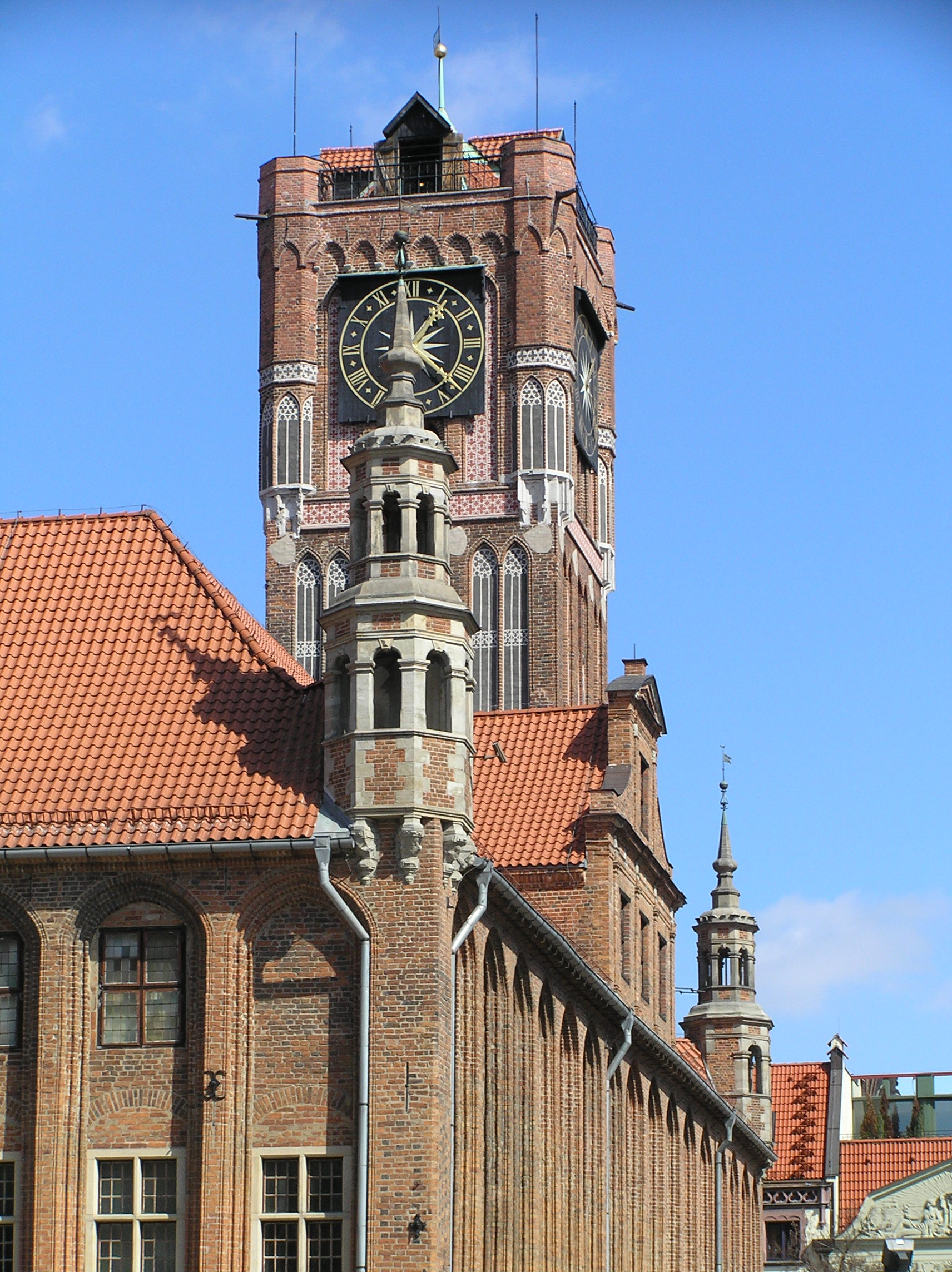
Old Town Hall, Toruń, Poland

In 1586, van Obbergen moved to Gdańsk where he brought a Flemish flavour to the city's architecture. In particular, he designed together with Jan Strakowski and Abraham van den Blocke the Old Arsenal, one of the great buildings in the Flemish Renaissance style (1601–1609) as well as the Old Town Hall (1587–1595) which displays the classic features of high quality Mannerist Flemish architecture.

Other achievements include a number of fine houses in Gdańsk which he designed together with Jan Strakowski as well as work on the city's fortifications.

Van Obbergen also designed the Old Town Hall in Toruń, Poland, which was completed in 1603.

== See also ==
- Architecture of Denmark
- Mannerist architecture and sculpture in Poland
