= Timm (disambiguation) =

Timm is a given name and a surname. Timm or TIMM may also refer to:

- TIMM (TV), a television channel from Germany
- Timm Aircraft, a former American aircraft manufacturer
- TIMM9, the gene encoding human protein Tim9
- TIMM10, the gene encoding human protein Tim10
