= Christopher Timm =

English cricketer

Personal information
- Full name: Christopher William Timm
- Born: 17 November 1968 (age 57); Didsbury, Lancashire, England
- Batting: Left-handed
- Role: Wicket-keeper

Domestic team information
- Years: Team
- 1989: Oxford University

Career statistics
Competition	First-class
Matches	2
Runs scored	10
Batting average	5.00
100s/50s	–/–
Top score	5
Catches/stumpings	–/1
- Source: Cricinfo, 7 April 2020

Christopher William Timm (born 17 November 1968) is an English former first-class cricketer.

Timm was born at Didsbury in November 1968. He later studied at University College, Oxford where he played first-class cricket for Oxford University in 1989, making two appearances against Northamptonshire and Middlesex at Oxford. Playing as a wicket-keeper, he scored 10 runs in his two matches and made a single stumping.
