= Syd Tims =

Australian rules footballer

Personal information
- Full name: Sydney Victor Tims
- Born: 12 November 1914; South Melbourne, Victoria
- Died: 30 May 1962 (aged 47); Huntingdale, Victoria
- Original team: Port Melbourne
- Height: 178 cm (5 ft 10 in)
- Weight: 74 kg (163 lb)

Playing career^{1}
Years	Club	Games (Goals)
1938–1939	South Melbourne	19 (18)
- ^{1} Playing statistics correct to the end of 1939.

Sydney Victor Tims (12 November 1914 – 30 May 1962) was an Australian rules footballer who played with South Melbourne in the Victorian Football League (VFL).

== Family ==
The son of John Tims (1875-1955), and Emily Edith Jane Tims (1877-1966), née Critch, Sydney Victor Tims was born at South Melbourne, Victoria on 12 November 1914.

He married Queenie Cowell at Port Melbourne on 20 June 1933. He married Mabel Veronica Hand (1913-1973) in 1954.

== Football ==
=== Port Melbourne (VFA) ===
He played in 16 matches (9 goals) for Port Melbourne in the VFA over two seasons (1936 and 1937).

=== South Melbourne (VFL) ===
He played in 19 matches (18 goals) for South Melbourne in the VFL over two seasons (1938 and 1939).

== Cricket ==
He was the honorary secretary of the Port Melbourne Cricket Club in the 1940s and 1950s.

== Military service ==
Tims served in the Australian Army during World War II.

== Death ==
He died at his residence in Huntingdale, Victoria on 30 May 1962.
