= Reinhold Timm =

Danish painter

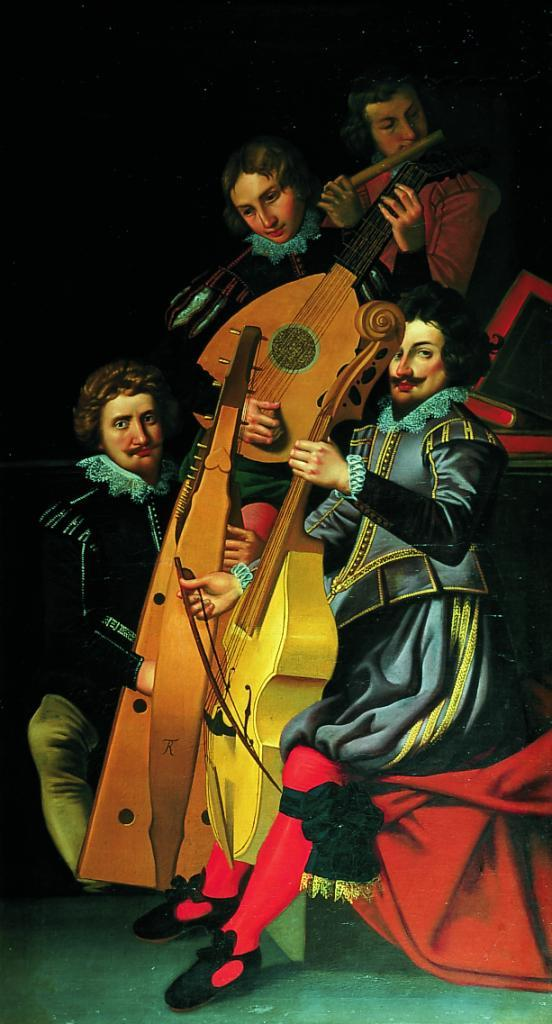
Christian IV's musicians painted by Reinhold Timm in 1622

Reinhold Timm (died 12 January 1639) was a Danish painter. From 1619 he participated in the decoration in the Long Hall at Rosenborg Castle in Copenhagen with 7 or 8 large allegorical paintings of which only one, Unge mænd brydes på en bro, is signed while the others are attributed. Today they are kept at Kronborg Castle.

From 1624 he was a drawing teacher at Sorø Academy.

== See also ==
- Art of Denmark
