= Gert van Groningen =

Sculptor

Gert van Groningen (died ca. 1577) was a sculptor active in Denmark in the 1570s, who probably came from Groningen in the Netherlands.

Gert is known to have been a citizen of Aarhus in 1573 when he was commissioned by King Frederik II to build a stone gate and a well at Skanderborg Castle. In 1574, the king transferred him to Kronborg Castle near Helsingør where he was responsible for coordinating all the sculptural additions. In particular, he designed two entrances, including the grand Royal Entrance complete with a bay, as well as fireplaces for the chambers of the king and his wife, Queen Sophie. It was also decided that the Skanderborg gate should be brought to Kronborg. Van Groningen's work for the king appears to have terminated in 1576 (the work was continued by his son, Herman Gertsen). He also completed two sandstone reliefs (1574) with the coats of arms of the king and queen for the entrance to Helsingør's town hall where they still stand today. By contrast, the coat of arms, crucifix and tombstone he designed for the chapel at Frederiksborg have now been lost. The epitaph to Holger Rosenkrantz with two wives in Uth Church near Horsens has also been attributed to Van Groningen.

== See also ==
- Danish sculpture
