= Emilie Timm =

Baltic German pianist

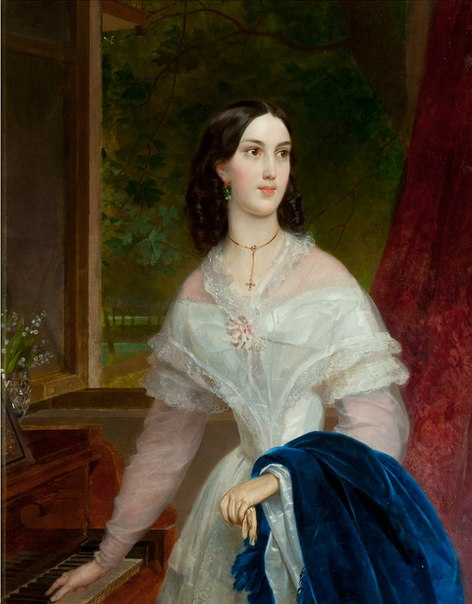
Emilie Timm

Emilie Timm (1821–1877) was a Baltic German pianist.

Emilie Timm was given a good education, and spoke six languages. She was educated by H. Dorn in Riga, and by A. Henselt in Saint Petersburg in Russia. She was a student of Frederic Chopin in Paris from 1842 through 1844.

She mainly resided in St. Petersburg, except for a period in 1862-1871, when she lived in Karlsruhe. From 1871, she had her own students in Saint Petersburg, Russia. She befriended V. v. Scheffel and the painters Ad. Schrödter, A. v. Werner and C. Ph. v. Reiff.

Timm married the painter Karl von Brüllow in 1839 (divorced). She married the journalist Alexey Nikolaevich Gretsch (1814—1850) in 1844.
