= Cornelis Floris de Vriendt =

Flemish sculptor and architect

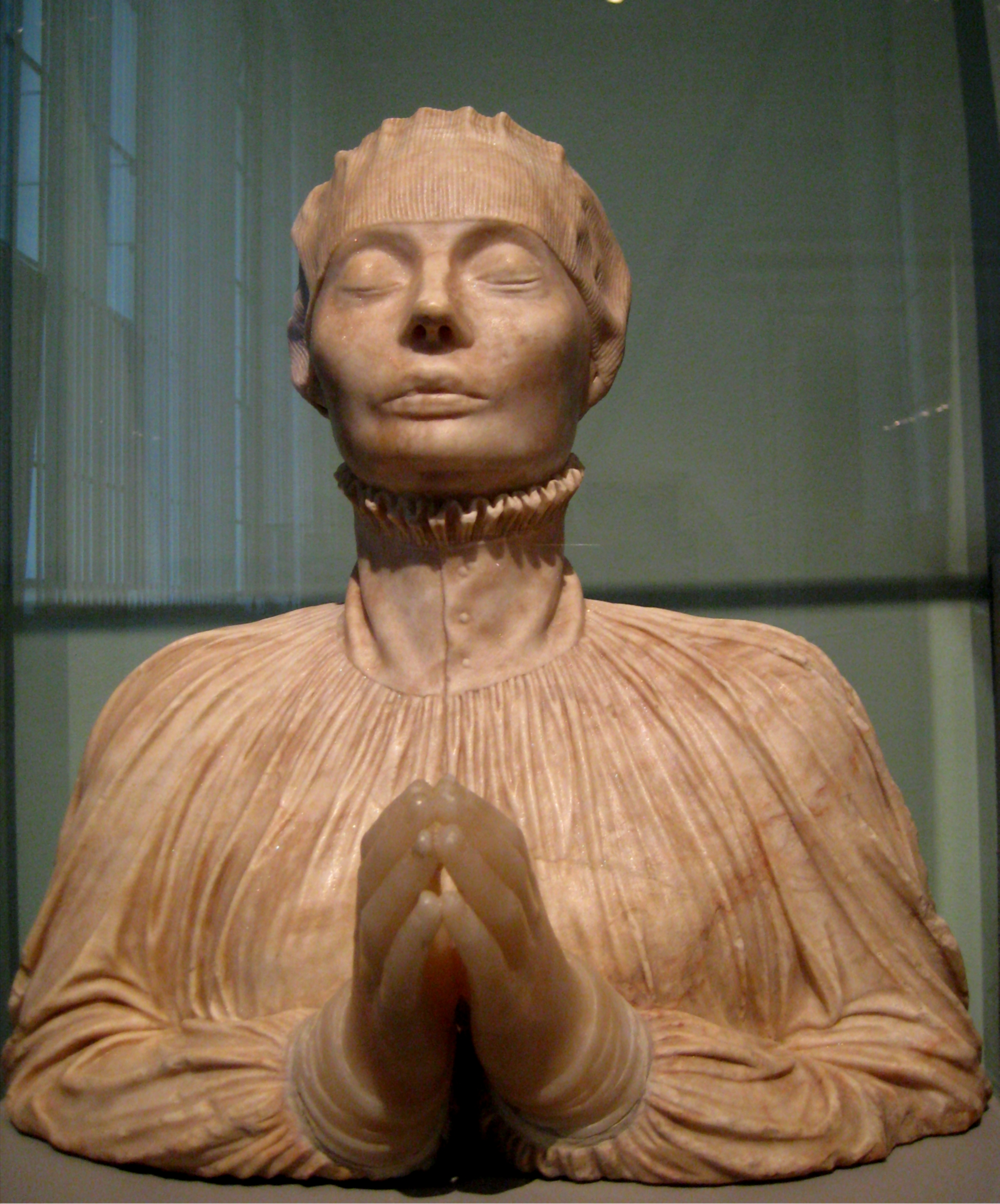
Dorothea of Denmark, Pushkin Museum

Cornelis Floris or Cornelis (II) Floris De Vriendt (c. 1514 – 20 October 1575) was a Flemish sculptor, architect, draughtsman, medallist and designer of prints and luxury. He operated a large workshop in Antwerp from which he worked on many large construction projects in Flanders, Germany and Denmark. He was one of the designers of the Antwerp City Hall. He developed a new style, which was informed by Flemish traditions, the 16th century Italian Renaissance and possibly the School of Fontainebleau. His innovations spread throughout Northern Europe where they had a major influence on the development of sculpture and architecture in the 16th and early 17th centuries.

== Life ==
Cornelis Floris II was born around the year 1514 as the eldest of the four sons of Cornelis the Elder and Margarita Goos. The earliest known ancestors of the Floris de Vriendt family, then still called only 'de Vriendt', were residents of Brussels where they practiced the craft of stonemason and stonecutter which was passed on from father to son. One of Cornelis' ancestors became in 1406 a master of the Brussels stonemasons guild. A family member, Jan Florisz. (abbreviation of Floriszoon, meaning son of Floris) de Vriendt, left his native Brussels and settled in Antwerp in the mid 15th century. The patronymic name 'Floris' became the common family name of the subsequent generations. The original form 'de Vriendt' can, however, still be found in official documents until the late 16th century.

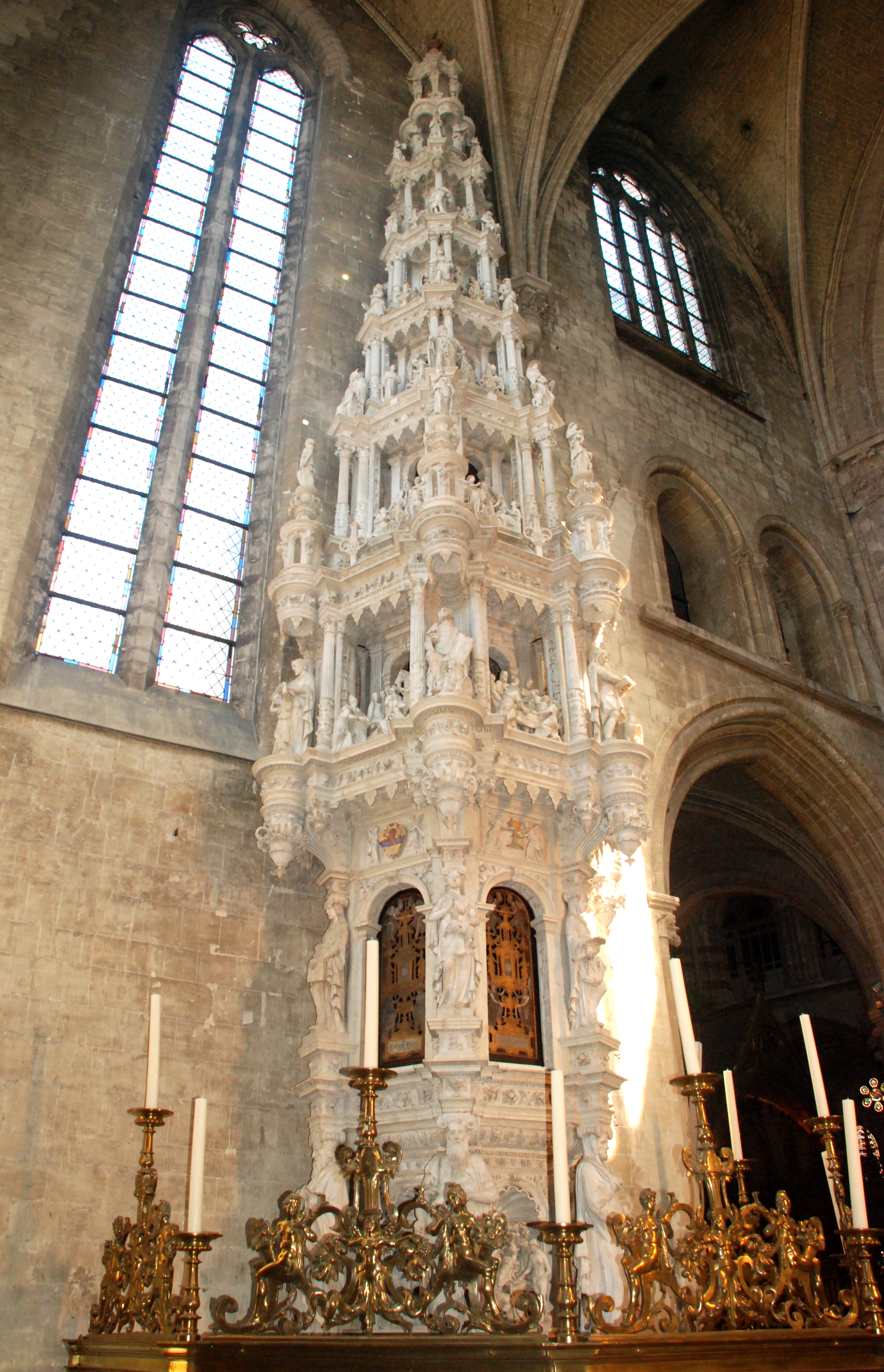
Tabernacle, St. Leonard's Church, Zoutleeuw

Little is known about his training. He probably worked in the workshop of his father who was a stonemason. He traveled abroad and was reportedly in Italy when his father died in 1538. He then returned to Antwerp to take care of his mother and younger brothers. In 1539, he became a master in the local Guild of Saint Luke. He served as the dean of the Guild in 1547 and 1559. At around 1540, the guild register was embellished with grotesque initials which were signed by Cornelis. These grotesque motives, that were inspired by Italian contemporary models which in turn were based on archeological finds in Rome, would become an important characteristic of the Floris style and were used by him (as well as his brother Frans) in his other works.

A hypothesis put forward in 2021 and explained in 2024 stating that the famous Roman drawings in the two Berlin scrapbooks were not executed by the Dutch painter Maarten van Heemskerck and the Anonimi A and B, but with a few exceptions entirely by Floris and dated between 1535/36 and 1538, was not taken up by archaeological and art-historical research and was refuted by several contributions to the Berlin exhibition catalog “The Allure of Rome. Maarten van Heemskerck draws the city."

In 1550, Floris married Elisabeth Machiels and bought a house in Antwerp that he renovated in his own style.

Cornelis Floris II died on 20 October 1575 after a rich career. At the beginning of his career, the renaissance was just starting to appear in the Netherlands. By the time he died, the new style was firmly established in the Netherlands. This was, however, not a simple copy of the Italian example as artists like Floris had imbued the style with homegrown sensibility.

Cornelis' brothers also became excellent artists. The most famous one is Frans, who was one of the leading Flemish mannerist painters while Jacob was a painter of stained-glass windows and Jan was a potter.

Cornelis had many pupils, a number of whom became established artists in their own right. They included Willem van den Blocke, Gert van Egen, Gillis de Witte, Philip Brandin, Robert Coppens, Heinrich Hagart, and Hieronymus van Kessel (I).

== Works ==
Cornelis Floris was a versatile artist. He was mainly active as architect and sculptor, but also worked as a designer of prints and other objects such as vases.

=== Sculpture ===
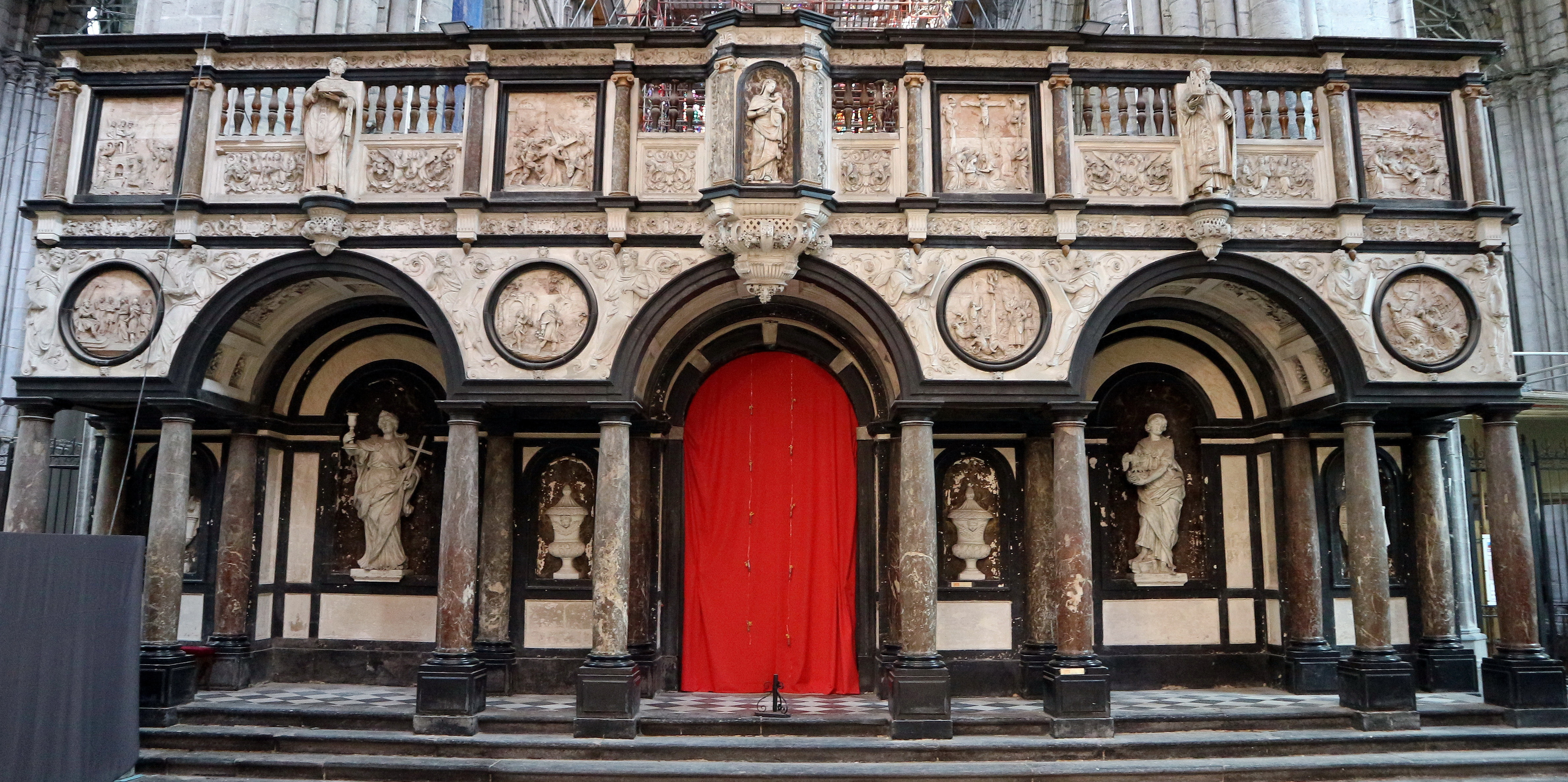
Marble Rood Screen with stations of the cross, in Tournai Cathedral

As a sculptor, he is principally known for his work on funeral monuments. In 1549, he received the commission for a funeral monument to be placed in Königsberg Cathedral for Dorothea, the wife of Albert, Duke in Prussia and daughter of the Danish king Frederick I. This was the beginning of many commissions for sepulchral monuments for members of the Danish royal family. These included the tomb of Albert, Duke in Prussia in Königsberg Cathedral, the mausoleum of King Christian III of Denmark and the Cenotaph of Frederick I in Schleswig Cathedral. The monuments were typically made in marble with the statue of the deceased executed in alabaster.

In his home country, he created in 1522 for the St. Leonard's Church in Zoutleeuw a stone tabernacle in the form of an 18-meter-high, nine-level tower. The tower made of white Avesnes stone was shipped in parts from Floris’ workshop in Antwerp to the church. This work still incorporates gothic elements. He created another tabernacle for the St. Catherina Church in Zuurbeemde (now part of Glabbeek) in 1555-1557 which is in a pure renaissance style. He also made the rood screen for the Notre-Dame Cathedral in Tournai and the tomb monument of Jean II de Mérode in the Saint Dymphna Church in Gheel.

This sequence of major assignments points to a large workshop with a fair number of employees. Cornelis Floris acted mainly as an organizer and planner. His pupils and assistants travelled to the various locations (usually in Northern Europe) where the monuments designed by Floris were to be installed. Many of them remained to live and work in Northern Europe where they set up their own workshops. They relied on the Floris network to find their own commissions while often also continuing to assist with the execution of designs of Floris in their place of residence. Some of these artists, such as Willem van den Blocke and Gert van Egen, became artists working for the local court and were instrumental in the spread of the Floris style in Northern Europe.

=== Architecture ===
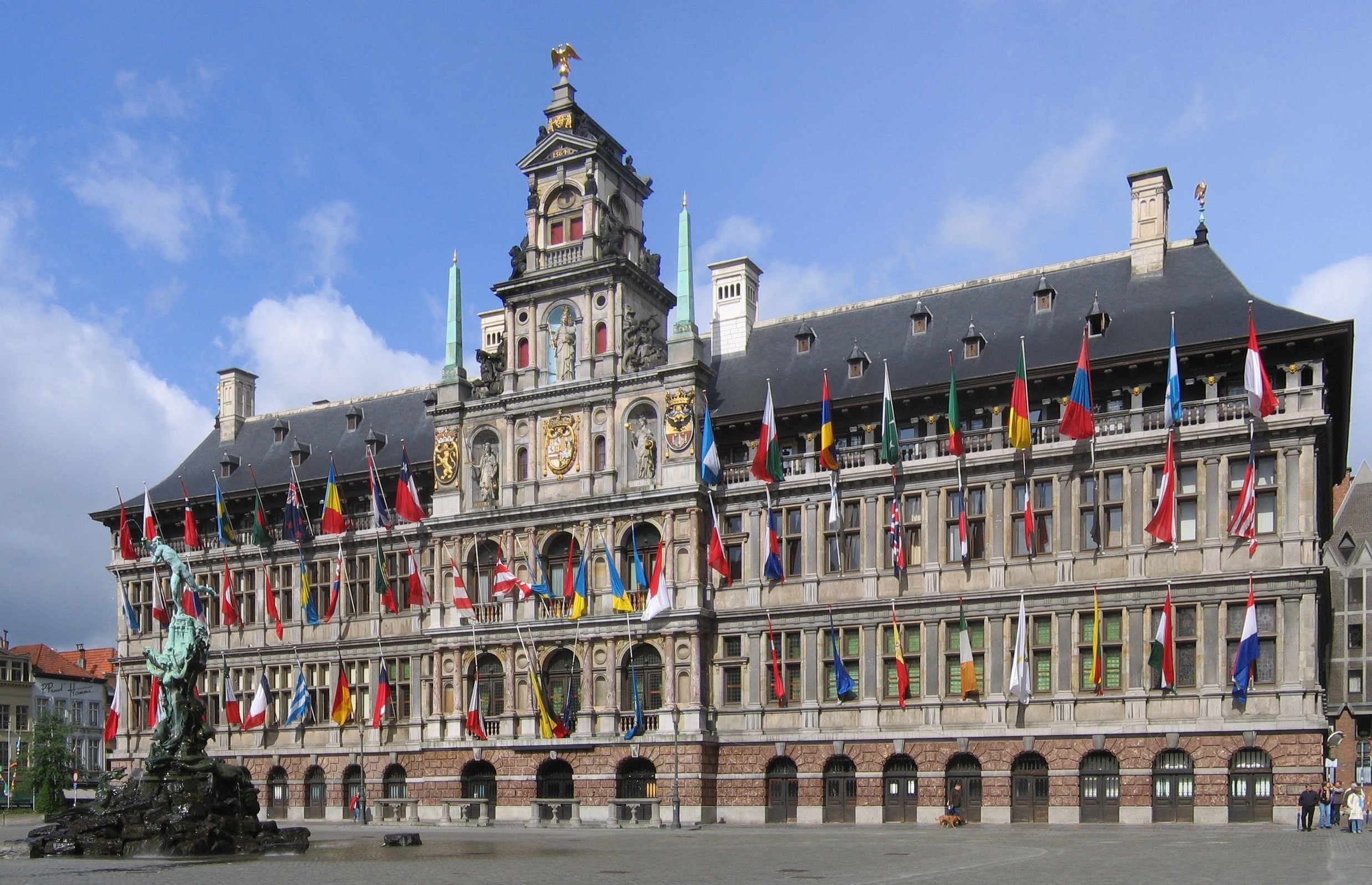
Antwerp city hall

From the late 1550s, Cornelis Floris was additionally active as a designer of buildings. He is listed among others as architect of the Antwerp City Hall. There are divergent views on the precise role of Cornelis Floris in the design of the building and its construction, as it was a collaborative effort which involved a great number of architects and sculptors including, amongst others, Willem van den Broeck, Hans Hendrik van Paesschen and Jan Daems. His contribution was not restricted to collaboration in the design. It is certain that he also had an important role in the practical execution. He visited quarries to choose stone and at that time maintained a large workshop in the Everdijstraat with a dozen assistants who were mainly busy with work related to the construction of the city hall. Their activity likely focused on the sculptures for the interior and the facade.

The Antwerp City Hall became a figurehead for the new renaissance style in architecture in the Netherlands. The city halls of Vlissingen and The Hague in the Netherlands and the design of the city hall of Emden, the portico of the Cologne City Hall (1557) in Germany and the Green Gate in Gdańsk, Poland were inspired by this new style.

Cornelis Floris also designed in Antwerp the Hanseatic League building and the town house of his brother Frans (1562–5). Both buildings no longer exist.

=== Prints ===
Floris was a prolific designers of prints and collaborated with the Antwerp publishers on various projects. Hieronymus Cock published in 1548 in Antwerp a series of 21 prints entitled Vazen, kannen en schalen met grotesken ('Vases, jugs and bowls with grotesques') which represented designs for vases, jugs and bowls with grotesque designs. The prints were cut by Balthasar van den Bosch.

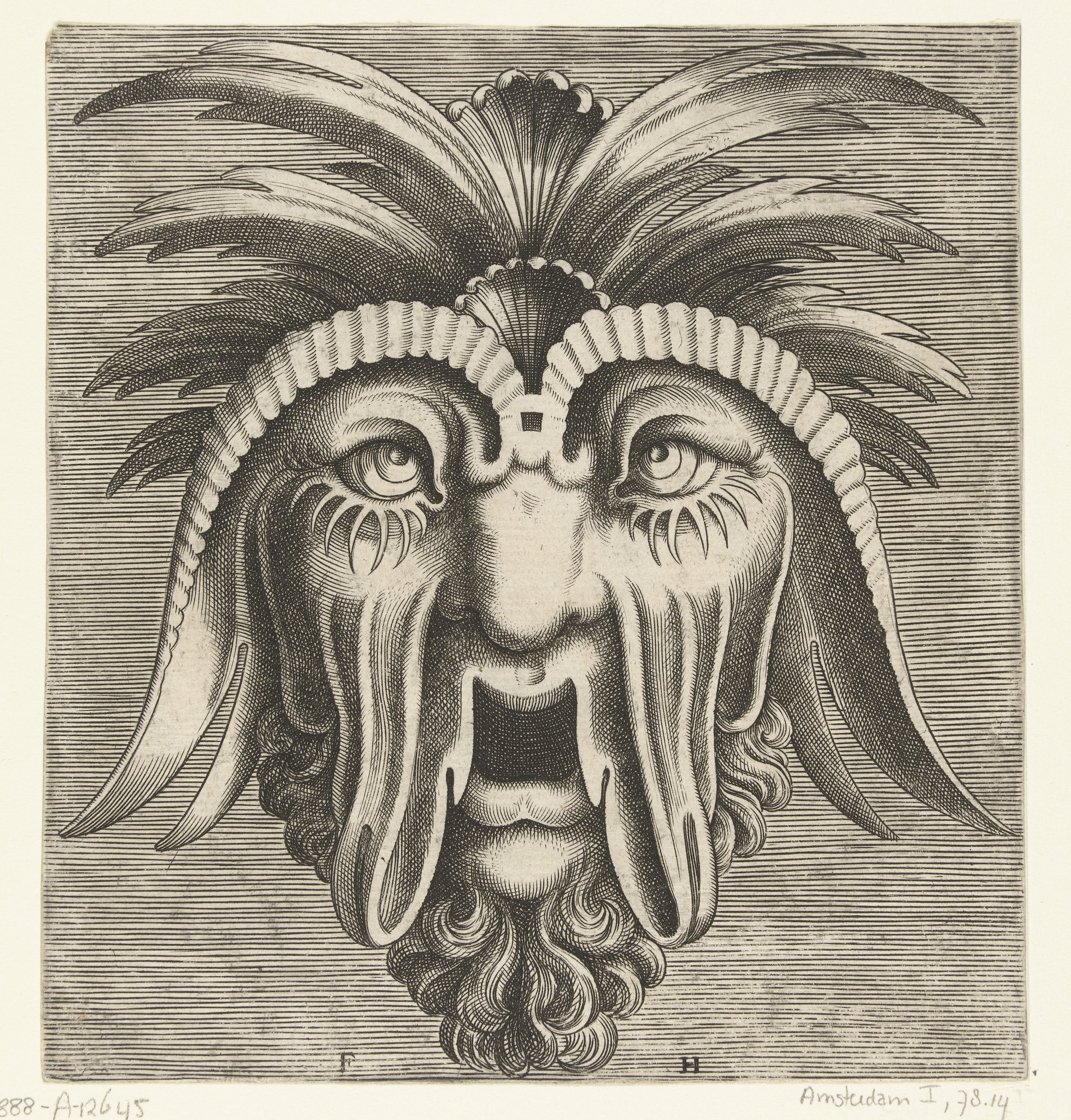
Grotesque masque, from 'Pourtraicture ingenieuse'

Hans Liefrinck printed in 1555 in Antwerp a set of 18 prints after designs by Floris under the title Pourtraicture ingenieuse de plusieurs facons de Masques (Ingenious depiction of various forms of masks). The prints were cut by Frans Huys and show 'grotesques' style derived from ancient Roman prototypes. The grotesque decoration originated from ancient Roman designs rediscovered in the late 15th century in the underground rooms, or grottoes, of the Golden House of Emperor Nero in Rome. Grotesque ornaments took inspiration from fish and animal forms or from vegetation.were used to decorate a wide range of objects, such as ceramics. Floris is credited with inventing a Flemish version of the grotesque style in about 1541.

Hieronymus Cock published in 1556 in Antwerp a suite of six strapwork cartouches with philosophical quotes in Latin. The engravings were cut by Joannes van Doetecum the Elder or Lucas van Doetecum. Hieronymus Cock published Veelderleij Veranderinghe van grotissen ende Compertimenten ghemaeckt tot dienste van alle die Conste beminne ende ghebruiken (Many variations of grottoes and compartments made to serve all who love and use art) in 1556 in Antwerp. The plates for this publication were cut by Joannes or Lucas van Doetecum after designs of Floris. The publication contained ornamental designs for the use by other artisans in the creation of furniture, vases, textiles etc. Many of the designs used grotesques, which were popular at the time. Hieronymus Cock published in 1557 a book with Floris' designs for tomb monuments and ornaments entitled the Veelderley niewe inuentien van antycksche sepultueren ('The many new designs of antique grave tombs'). The 14 plates were engraved by Joannes or Lucas van Doetecum.

These publications contributed to the spread of Floris' inventions and style throughout Northern Europe.
