= Kronborg =

Medieval castle in Helsingør, Denmark

- Kronborg Castle (2026)
- Interactive map of Kronborg
- 56°02′19″N 12°37′19″E
- Location: Helsingør, Denmark

History
- Built: 1420s

Site notes
- Architect(s): Hans Hendrik van Paesschen; Anthonis van Obbergen
- Architectural style: Renaissance architectural style
- Website: https://kronborg.dk/en

UNESCO World Heritage Site
- Criteria: Cultural: iv
- Reference: 696
- Inscription: 2000 (24th Session)

Exterior view of the main entrance to Kronborg Castle (2026)

A view through the arched doorway inside the fortress, looking toward the inner grounds

Aerial video showing a bird's-eye view of Kronborg Castle

Kronborg (Danish pronunciation: [ˈkʰʁoːnˌpɒˀ]) is a castle and historical stronghold in the town of Helsingør, Denmark. Immortalised as Elsinore in William Shakespeare's play Hamlet, Kronborg is one of the most important Renaissance castles in Northern Europe. It was inscribed on the UNESCO World Heritage List in 2000.

The castle is situated on the extreme northeastern tip of the island of Zealand at the narrowest point of the Øresund, the sound between present Denmark and the provinces of present Sweden. The latter were under Danish control at the time the castle was built. In this part, the sound is only 4 kilometres (2.5 mi) wide, hence the strategic importance of maintaining a coastal fortification at this location commanding one of the few outlets of the Baltic Sea.

The castle's story dates back to a stronghold, Krogen, built by King Eric VII in the 1420s. Along with the fortress Kärnan in Helsingborg, on the opposite coast of Øresund, it controlled the entrance to the Baltic Sea. From 1574 to 1585, King Frederick II had the medieval fortress radically transformed into a magnificent Renaissance castle. The main architects were the Flemings Hans Hendrik van Paesschen and Anthonis van Obbergen. The sculptural work was coordinated by Gert van Groningen.

In 1629, a fire destroyed much of the castle, but King Christian IV subsequently had it rebuilt. The castle has a church within its walls. In 1658, Kronborg was besieged and captured by the Swedes, who took many of its valuable art treasures as war booty.

In 1785, the castle ceased to be a royal residence and was converted into barracks for the Army. The Army left the castle in 1923. After a thorough renovation, the complex was opened to the public.

== History ==
=== Krogen ===
The castle's history dates to a fortress, Krogen (lit. 'the Hook'), built in the early 15th century by the Danish king, Eric of Pomerania. The king insisted on payment of sound dues by all ships wishing to enter or leave the Baltic Sea through the Øresund; to help enforce his demands, he built a powerful fortress at the narrowest point in the Sound. At the time, the Kingdom of Denmark extended across both sides of the Sound. On the eastern shore the Helsingborg Castle had been operating since the Middle Ages. With the two castles and guard ship, Denmark could control all navigation through the Sound.

The castle was built on Ørekrog, a sandy tongue of land stretching into the sea from the coast of Zealand toward the coast of Scania. The castle consisted of a square curtain wall with a number of stone buildings inside. The stone building in the northeastern corner contained the king's residence. The building in the southwestern corner contained a large arched banquet hall. The building in the southeastern corner possibly served as the chapel. Large portions of the walls of Krogen are contained within the present-day Kronborg Castle.

King Christian III had the corners of the curtain wall supplemented with bastions in 1558–1559.

=== Frederick II's Kronborg ===
As a consequence of developments in the military technique of the era and the improved striking power of the artillery, it became clear that it was necessary to modernize the fortifications of Krogen. After the conclusion of the Northern Seven Years' War in 1570, King Frederick II initiated an extension of the advanced bastions to relieve the medieval curtain wall. The main architect was the Flemish architect Hans Hendrik van Paesschen and the fortification works were completed in 1577. After this, the castle acquired its current name of Kronborg (lit. 'Crown Castle').

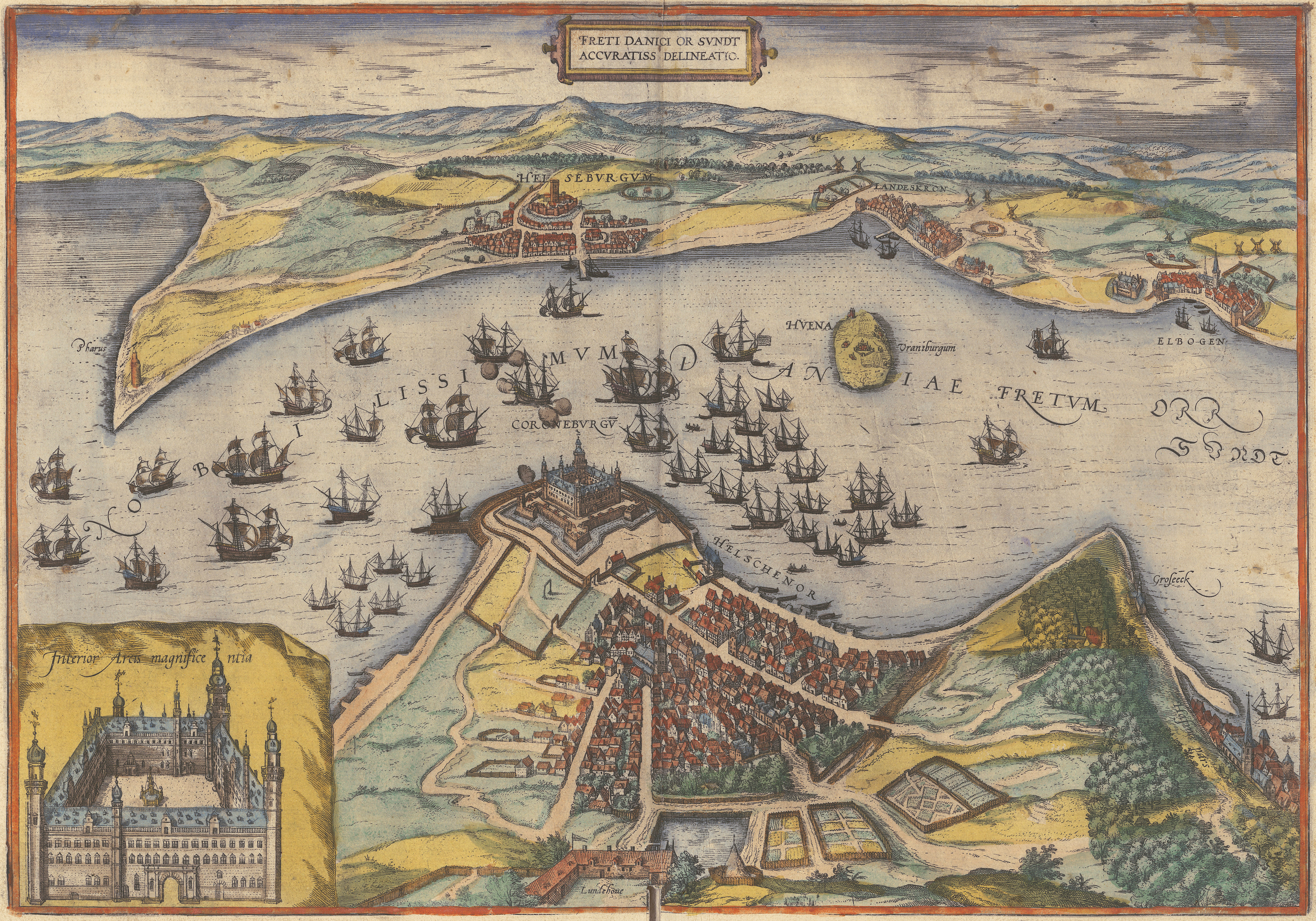
Kronborg Castle and the Øresund from the 1580s geography book Civitates Orbis Terrarum

The castle itself was rebuilt from 1574 to 1585, with the separated buildings of Krogen being extended to three coherent wings. The north wing was equipped with chambers for the king, queen and her ladies-in-waiting as well as for the chancellery. In the south wing, the medieval building in the southeast corner was refitted as a modern chapel with the vaulted windows facing the chapel being retained. Frederick was a keen patron of theatre and players performed at the castle when he held court there in 1579.

Initially, the castle was reconstructed only to a height of two storeys. In 1578, however, the Flemish architect Anthonis van Obbergen was engaged as new master builder and work was undertaken to make Kronborg even larger and more magnificent. The sculptural work was coordinated by Gert van Groningen. As a sign of the new ambitions, the south wing was heightened by one storey and a new, gigantic ball room placed over the chapel. Soon after the west and north wings were also heightened by one storey. Finally, the east wing was also heightened with a passageway, The Queen's Gallery, allowing the Queen comfortable passage from her chambers in the north wing to the ball room in the south wing. The exterior walls were clad with sandstone from Scania, and the new castle was given a roof with copper sheeting.

James VI of Scotland stayed in the castle in 1590 after his marriage to Anne of Denmark. James gave 2,000 Danish dalers in gold coins to the officers and servants in the castle as a reward.

=== Fire of 1629 ===
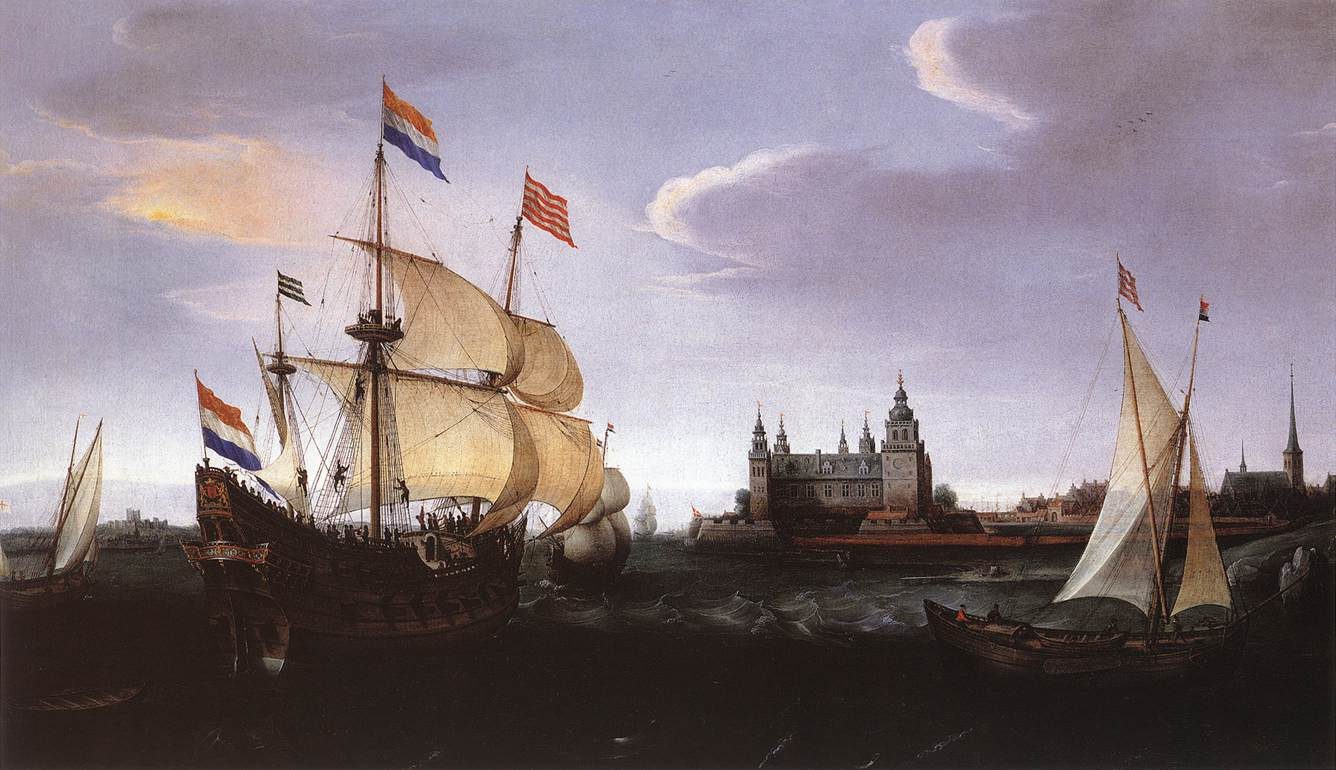
Arrival of a Dutch three-master at Kronborg Castle, by Hendrick Cornelisz Vroom.

In 1629, a moment's carelessness by two workmen caused much of the castle to go up in flames on the night of 24-25 September. Only the chapel was spared by the strength of its ceiling vaults. King Christian IV put great efforts into restoring the castle. Already in 1631, the work was underway, led by the architect Hans van Steenwinckel the Younger. By 1639, the exterior — which in keeping with the king's wish was reconstructed without major changes — was once again magnificent, but the interior never fully regained its former glory. Furthermore, certain modernizations were made, and portals, chimneypieces, ceiling paintings and other decorations were renewed in Baroque style.

=== Swedish conquest of 1658 ===
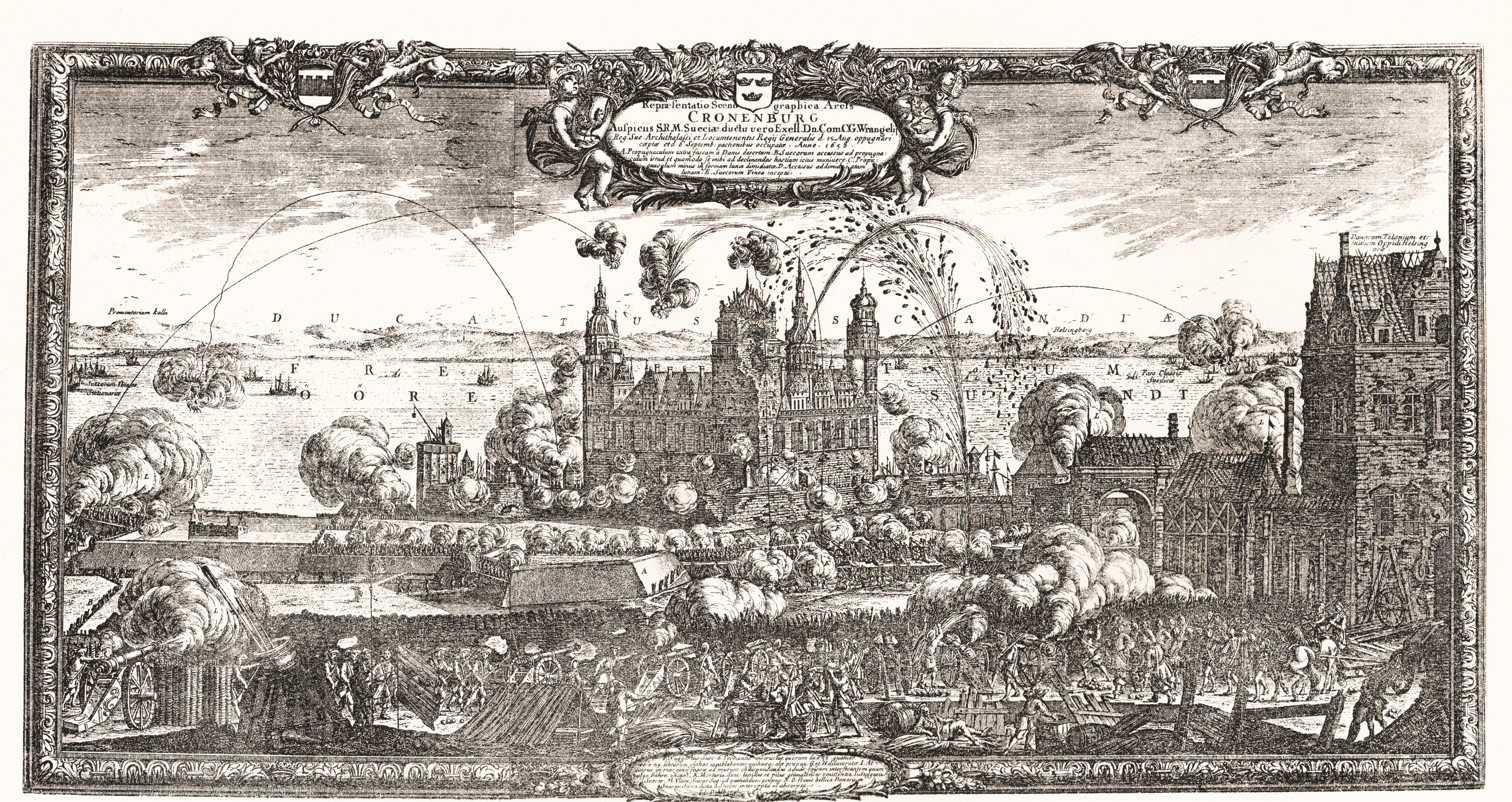
The siege of Kronborg in 1658

During the Dano-Swedish war of 1658–1660, Kronborg was besieged, attacked and conquered by a Swedish army commanded by Carl Gustaf Wrangel. During the Swedish occupation, the queen of Sweden, Hedvig Eleonora of Holstein-Gottorp and the Swedish king's sister Maria Eufrosyne of Pfalz lived at Kronborg, where they were visited by Charles X of Sweden during the campaign and entertained the foreign ambassadors.

As a result of the Swedish occupation, Kronborg was deprived of many of its most precious art works, including the richly decorated fountain in the castle courtyard, Frederick II's canopy and a number of the large ceiling paintings commissioned by Christian IV for the ballroom.

=== Garrison fortress ===
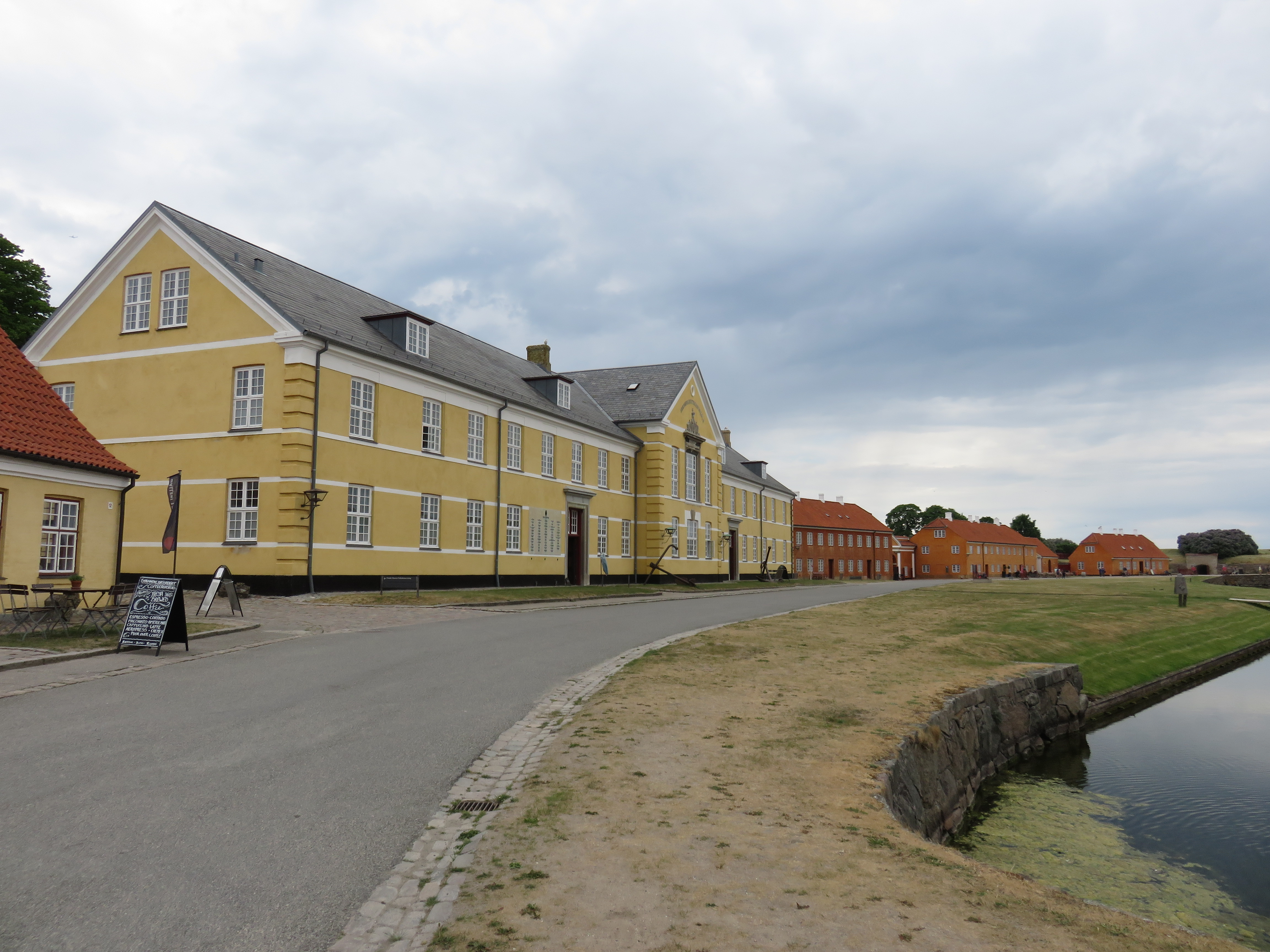
Former military barracks on the outskirts of the castle in 2018

Map of the fortifications (around 1765)

The Swedish conquest of Kronborg in 1658 demonstrated that the castle was far from impregnable. Afterwards, the defences were strengthened significantly. From 1688 to 1690, an advanced line of defence was added called the Crownwork. Shortly afterwards, a new series of ramparts were built around it. After their completion, Kronborg was considered the strongest fortress in Europe.

From 1739 until the 20th century, Kronborg was used as a prison. The inmates were guarded by the soldiers billeted in the castle. The convicts had been sentenced to work on the castle's fortifications. The convicts were divided into two categories: those with minor sentences were categorised as "honest" and were allowed to work outside the castle walls; those serving sentences for violence, murder, arson or the like were categorised as "dishonest" and had to serve the full sentence doing hard physical labour inside the castle ramparts. Otherwise, they served their time under the same conditions: they all had to wear chains and spend nights in cold and damp dungeons. From 17 January to 30 April 1772, Kronborg was the place of imprisonment of Queen Caroline Mathilde, sister of King George III, following the scandal of her affair with Johann Friedrich Struensee.

As Kronborg's importance as a royal castle diminished, the armed forces came to play a greater role. From 1785 to 1922, the castle was completely under military administration. During this period, a number of renovations were completed.

=== Sound Dues and recent history ===
The captain of every ship sailing through the strait had to state the value of ship's cargo. Money that had to be paid to the King of Denmark, called Sound Dues, was then calculated depending on the value of the cargo. The king had the right to buy the cargo for the price the ship's captain stated. This policy prevented captains from stating prices that were too low. The Royal Danish Army left the castle in 1923, and after a thorough renovation it was opened to the public in 1938.

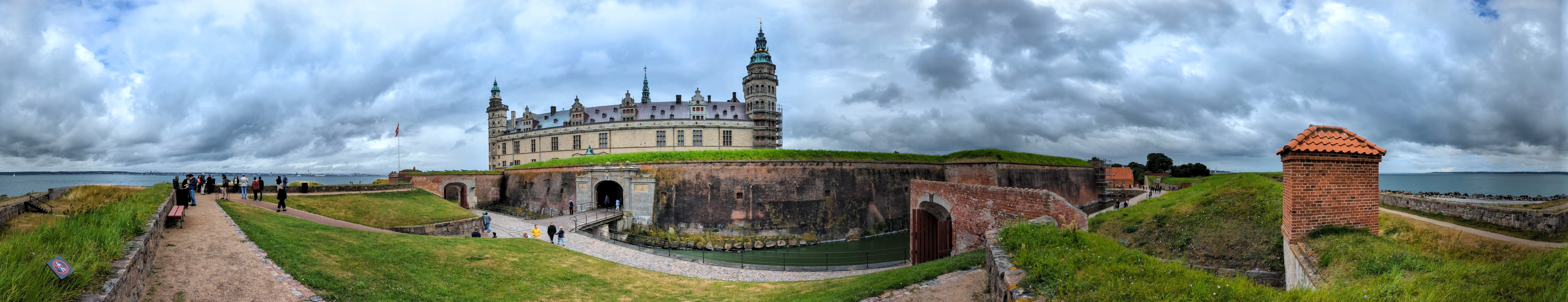
Panoramic view with the sound in the background

== Kronborg today ==
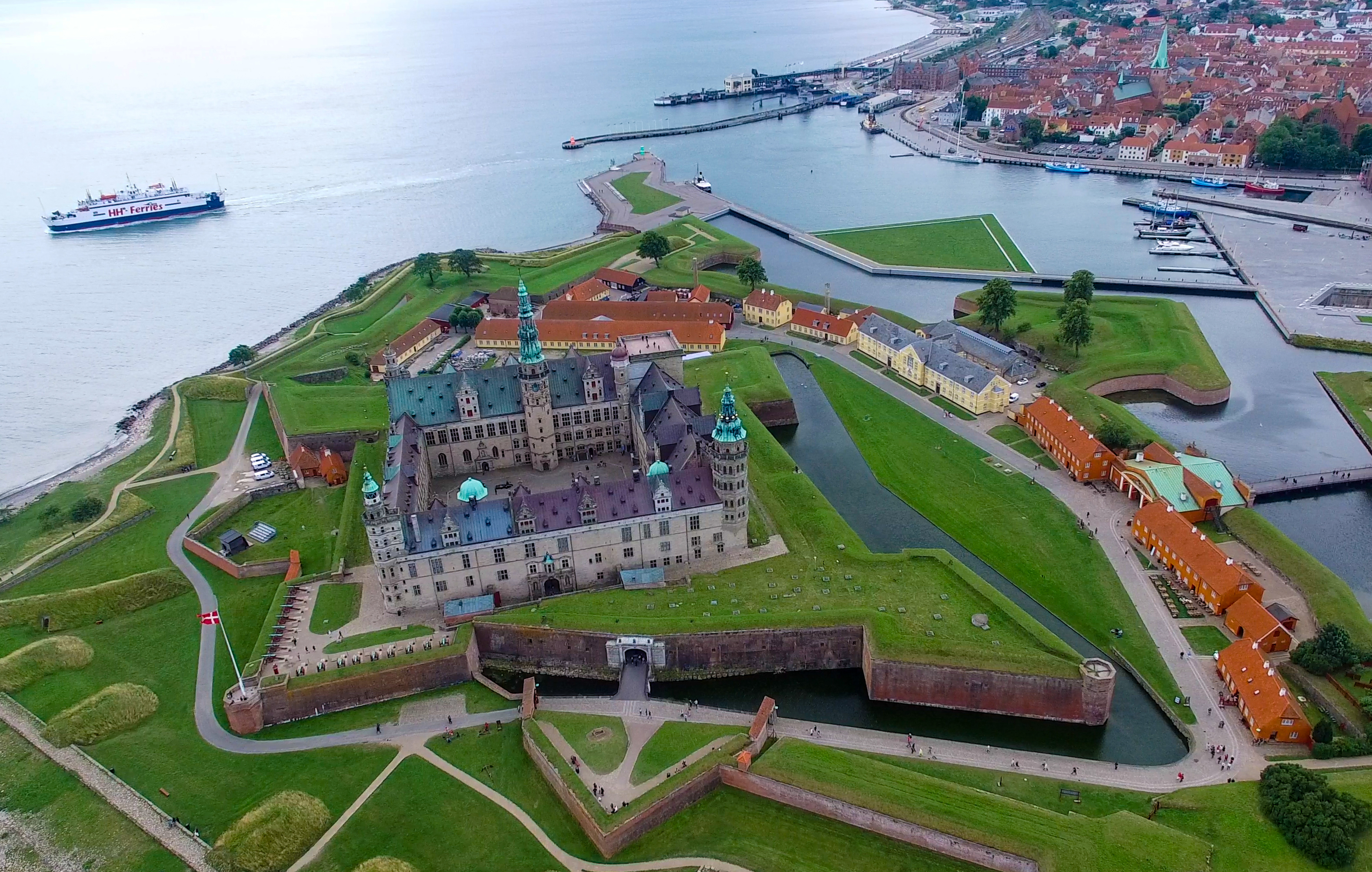
Kronborg castle is situated on the extreme northeastern tip of the island of Zealand at the narrowest point of the Øresund.

Kronborg Castle is located on the extreme northeastern tip of the island of Zealand, to the northeast of the historic centre of the town of Helsingør. It is situated at an elevation of 12 metres, on a small foreland jutting out into the narrowest point of the Øresund, the sound between the Danish island of Zealand and the Swedish province of Scania, that was also Danish until 1658. The approach from the town is to the east, with a series of moats and gates protecting the route from the town to the castle itself.

=== Royal apartments ===
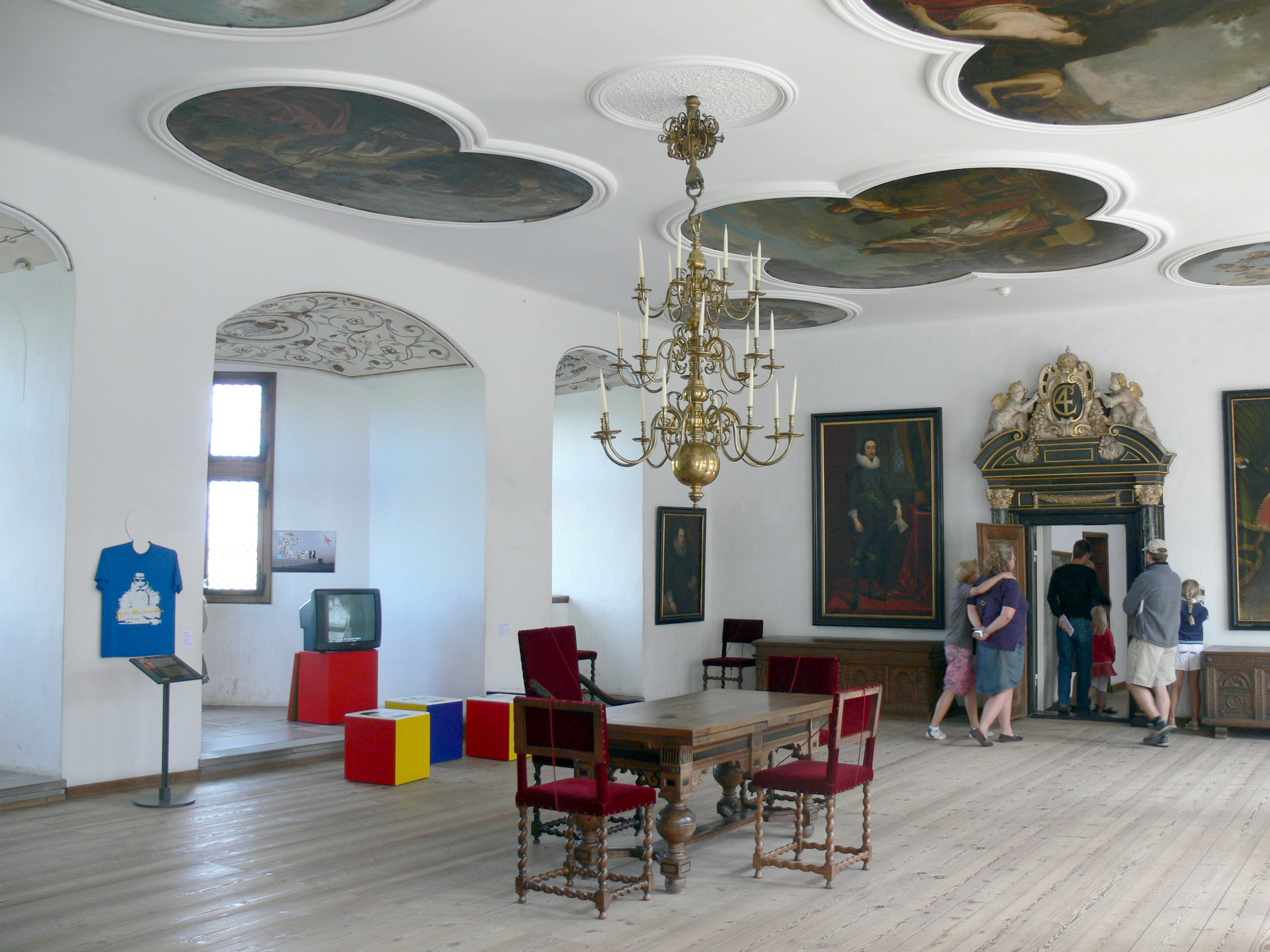
The King's Chamber in 2008

The royal apartments are located on the first floor of the north wing. The apartments were originally furnished by Frederick II around 1576, but after the fire in 1629, Christian IV had the apartments refurnished and richly decorated with ceiling paintings, stone portals and chimneypieces. The original floors were tiled in black and white which were replaced with wooden floorboards in 1760–61, and the walls were clad in gilt-leather. Today the chambers are furnished with Netherlandish furniture from the 17th century.

The King's Chamber has a bay window, located right above the castle's main portal, from which the king could keep an eye on guests arriving at the castle, whereas the Queen's Chamber has access to a vaulted tower chamber overlooking the Flag Bastion.

=== Ballroom ===
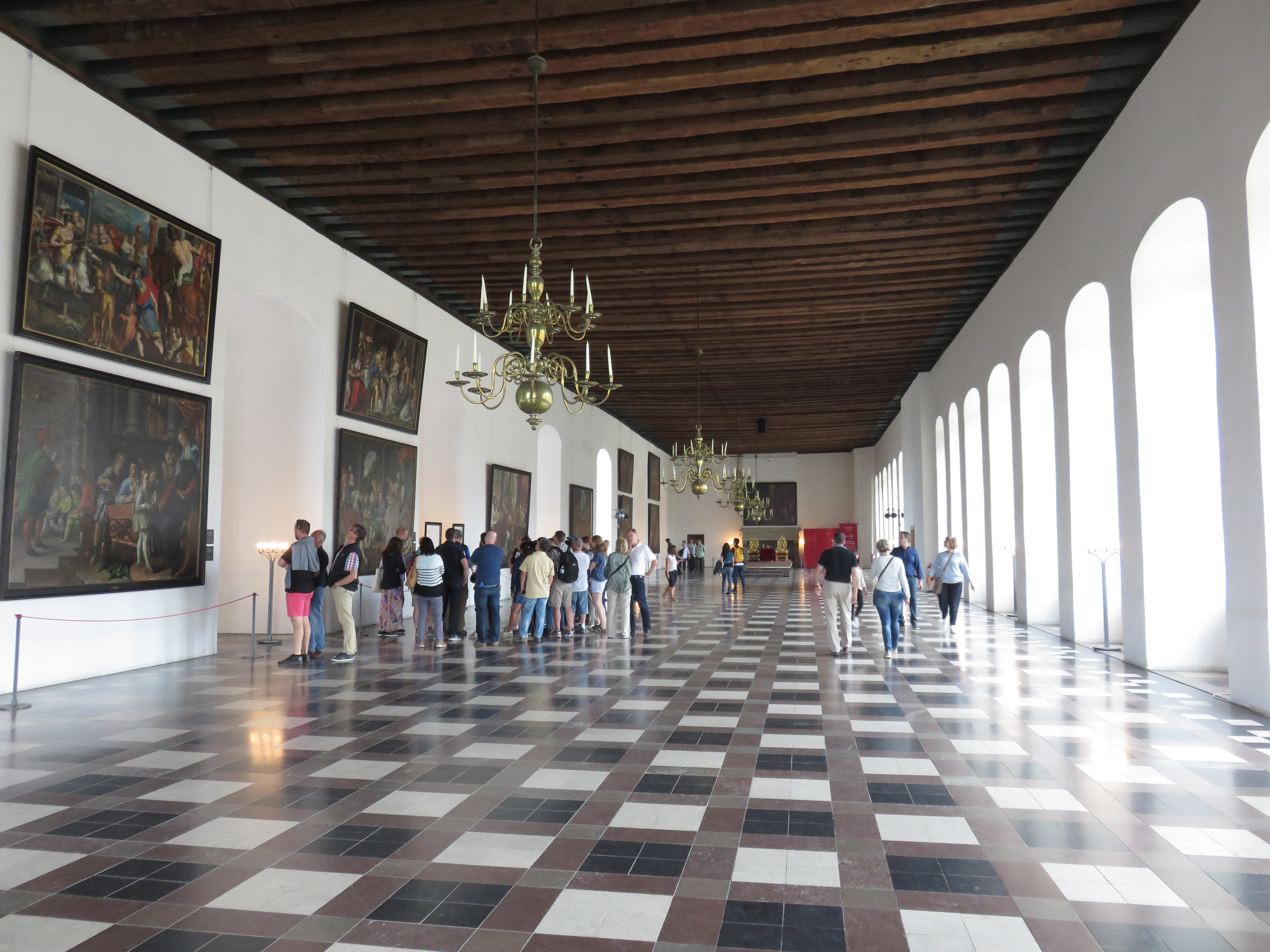
The Great Ballroom in 2018

Measuring 62 x 12 metres, the Ballroom was the largest hall in Northern Europe when it was completed in 1582. The walls are hung with a series of large paintings which were originally made from 1618 to 1631 for the Great Hall of Rosenborg Castle in Copenhagen. The paintings in the Ballroom include: Children off to School by Francis Cleyn, Feminine Pursuits by Reinhold Timm, Riding at the Ring by Reinhold Timm, A Boys School by Francis Cleyn, A Wedding in a Church by Francis Cleyn, An Academy for Noblemen by Reinhold Timm, A Banquet (1622) by Isaac Isaacsz. The present floor and the fireplaces are from the rebuilding in 1924–38.

=== Little Hall ===
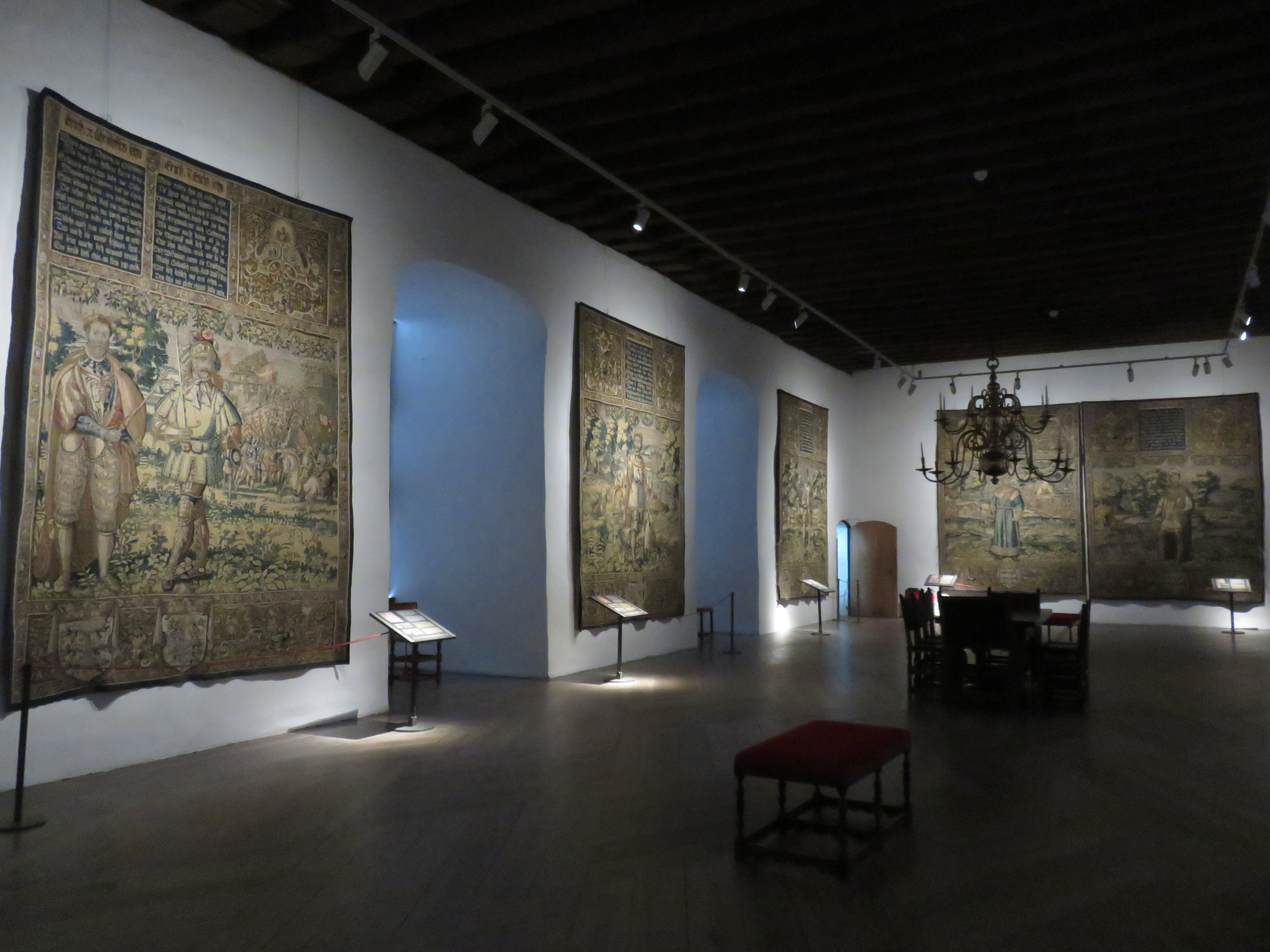
The Little Hall with five of the seven tapestries in 2018

The walls of the Little Hall are furnished with seven tapestries originally from a series of forty tapestries portraying one hundred Danish kings. The masterpieces include Tapestry depicting Oluf (1376–1387) and Tapestry depicting Knud VI (1182–1202). The tapestries were commissioned by Frederick II around 1580. Seven more tapestries are at the National Museum of Denmark, while the rest have been lost.

=== Chapel ===
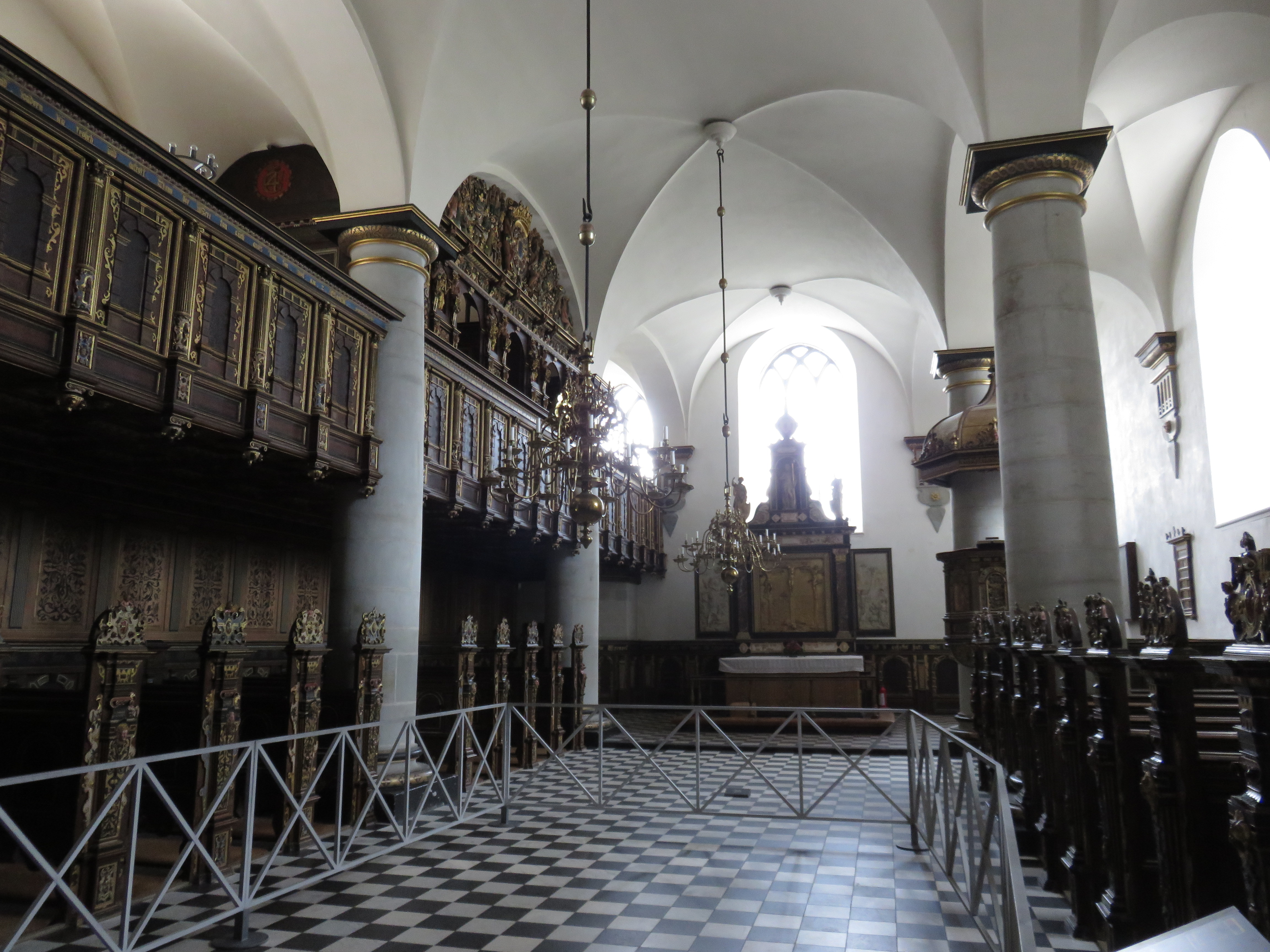
The Chapel in 2018

The chapel is located in the ground floor of the south wing and was inaugurated in 1582. In 1785, as the castle was being fitted for use as army barracks, the chapel was fitted out as a gymnasium and fencing hall and the furniture stored away. The chapel was refurnished with the original furniture in 1838 and reinaugurated in 1843.

== Cultural significance ==
=== Hamlet ===
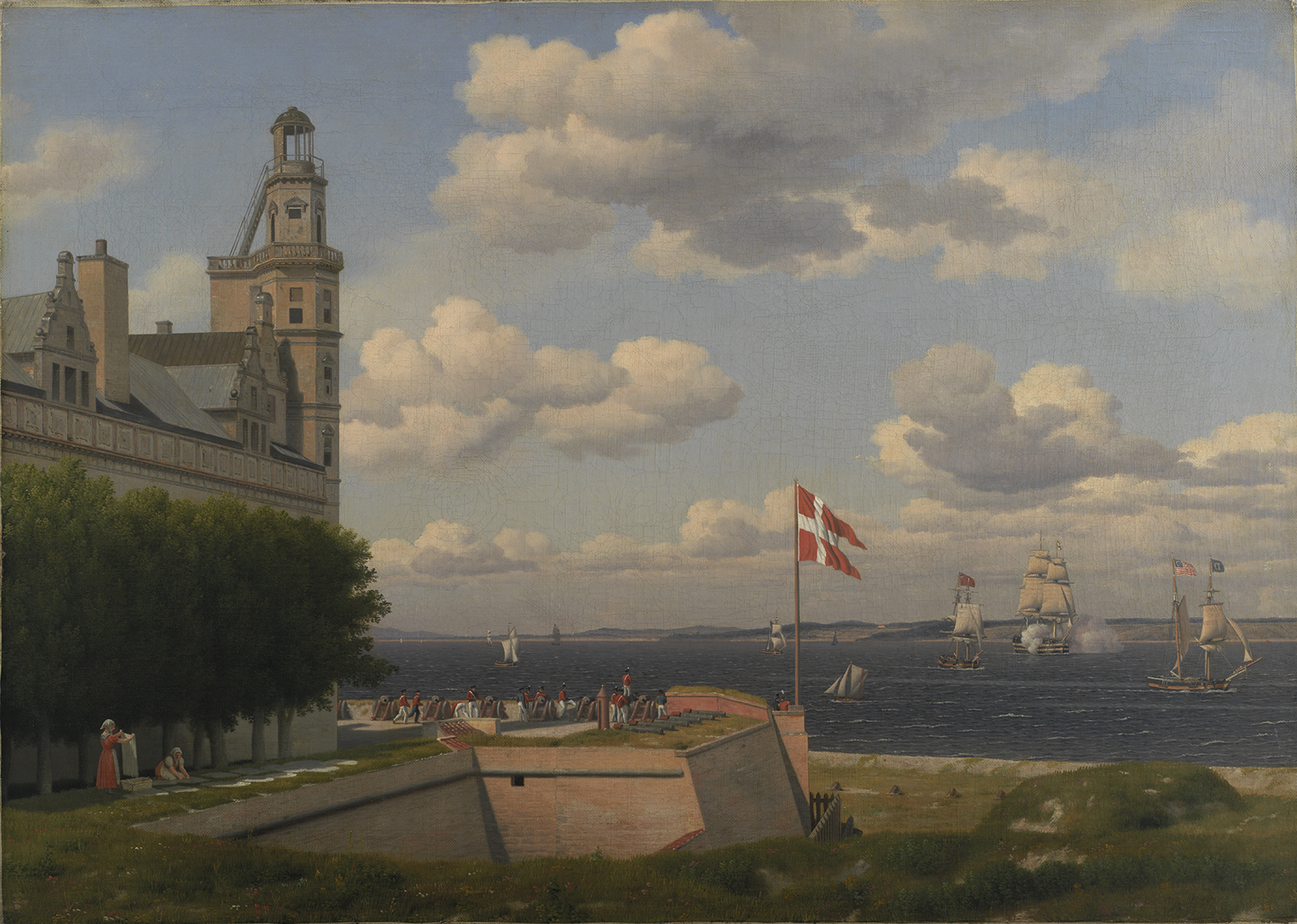
A View towards the Swedish Coast from the Ramparts of Kronborg Castle by Danish Golden Age artist Christoffer Wilhelm Eckersberg, 1829

Rendered as "Elsinore," actually the anglicised name of the surrounding town of Helsingør, Kronborg serves as the setting of William Shakespeare's tragedy Hamlet, Prince of Denmark. The play has been performed at the castle several times.

Hamlet was first staged at Kronborg in 1816, in commemoration of the 200th anniversary of Shakespeare's death; it was performed by soldiers from the castle garrison, and staged in the telegraph tower in the castle's southwest corner. The play has since been performed several times in the courtyard and at various locations on the fortifications. Later performers to play Hamlet at the castle include Laurence Olivier, John Gielgud, Christopher Plummer, Derek Jacobi, David Tennant, and in 2009 Jude Law. In 2017, Hamletscenen presented a production of Hamlet at Kronborg, directed by Lars Romann Engel; the role of Hamlet was played by Cyron Melville and music for the production was composed by Mike Sheridan.

=== Ogier the Dane ===
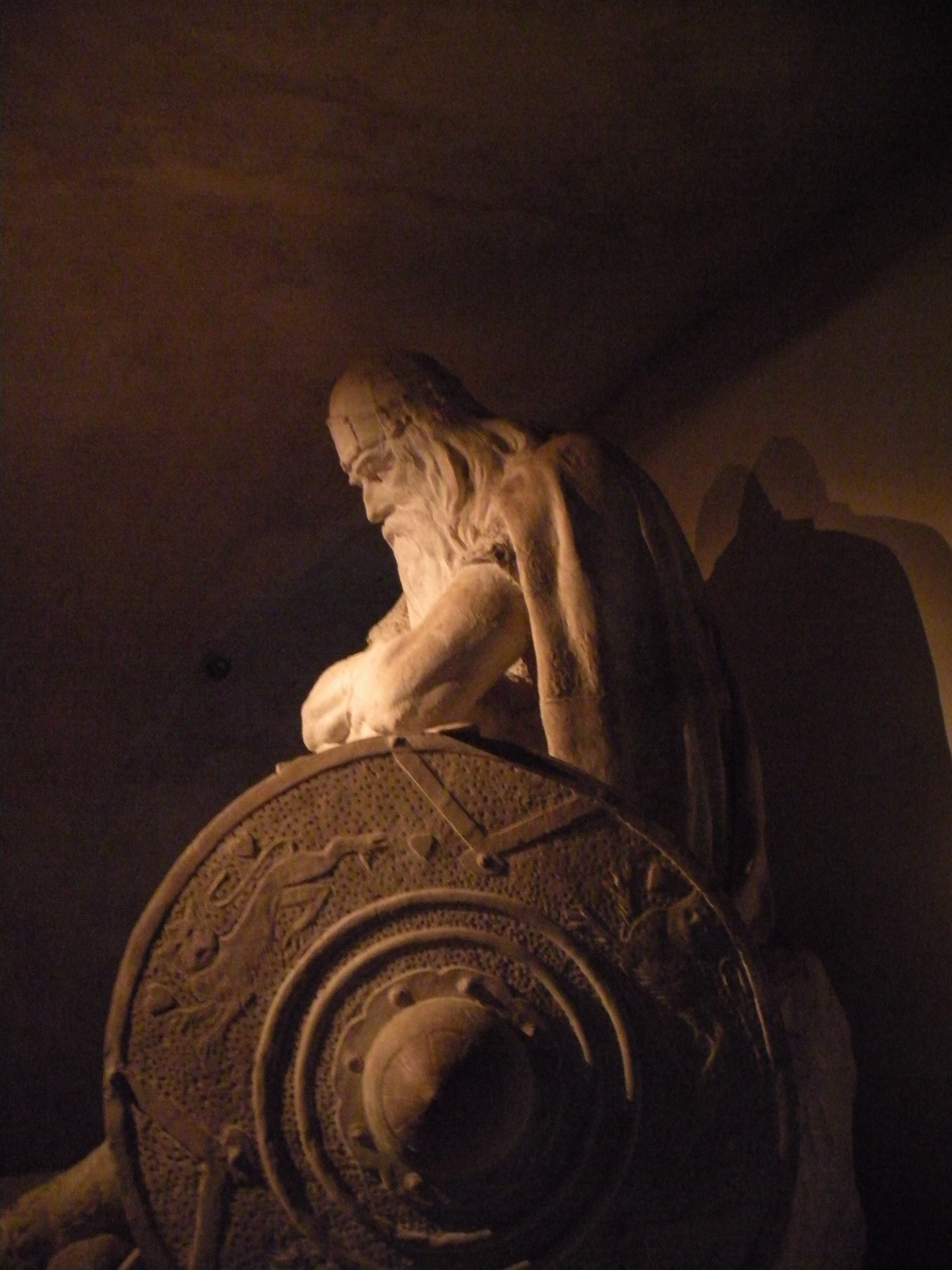
Statue of Ogier in the castle's casemates in 2010

According to a legend linked to Arthurian myth, a Danish king known as Ogier the Dane (Danish: Holger Danske), was taken to Avalon by the enchantress Morgan le Fay. Ogier returned to rescue France from danger, then travelled to Kronborg castle, where he sleeps until he is needed to save his homeland. His beard has grown to extend along the ground. A statue of the sleeping Ogier (right) has been placed in the castle casemates.

=== Culture Harbour Kronborg ===
Kulturhavn Kronborg is an initiative of 2013 to offer a variety of culture experiences to residents and visitors to Helsingør. Kulturhavn Kronborg is a joint initiative by Kronborg Castle, Danish Maritime Museum, Kulturværftet and Helsingør harbour.

=== Other ===
The castle was the setting of the televised holiday series Jul på Kronborg (English: Christmas at Kronborg), which featured both Hamlet and Holger the Dane. 'Elsinore Beer' is named for the castle in the 1983 comedy Strange Brew, starring Rick Moranis and Dave Thomas.

== See also ==
- Kronborg Glacier
- List of castles and palaces in Denmark
- Tourism in Denmark
- Kronborg Tapestries
