= Hans Hendrik van Paesschen =

Felmish architect (c. 1510–1582)

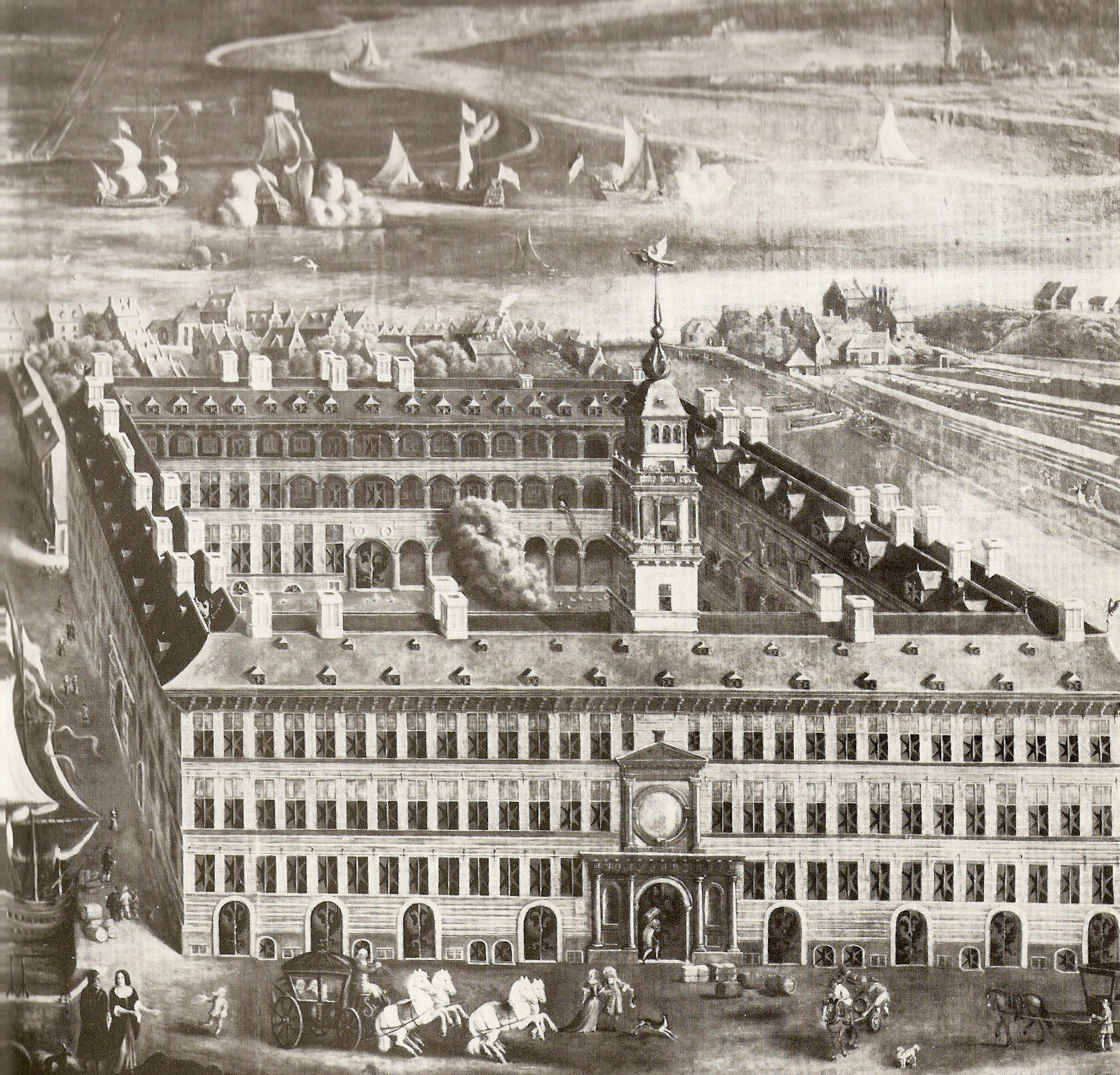
The Oostershuis in Antwerp depicted in c. 1700

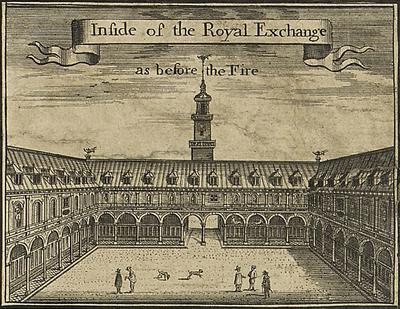
The first Royal Exchange in London, 17th-century depiction

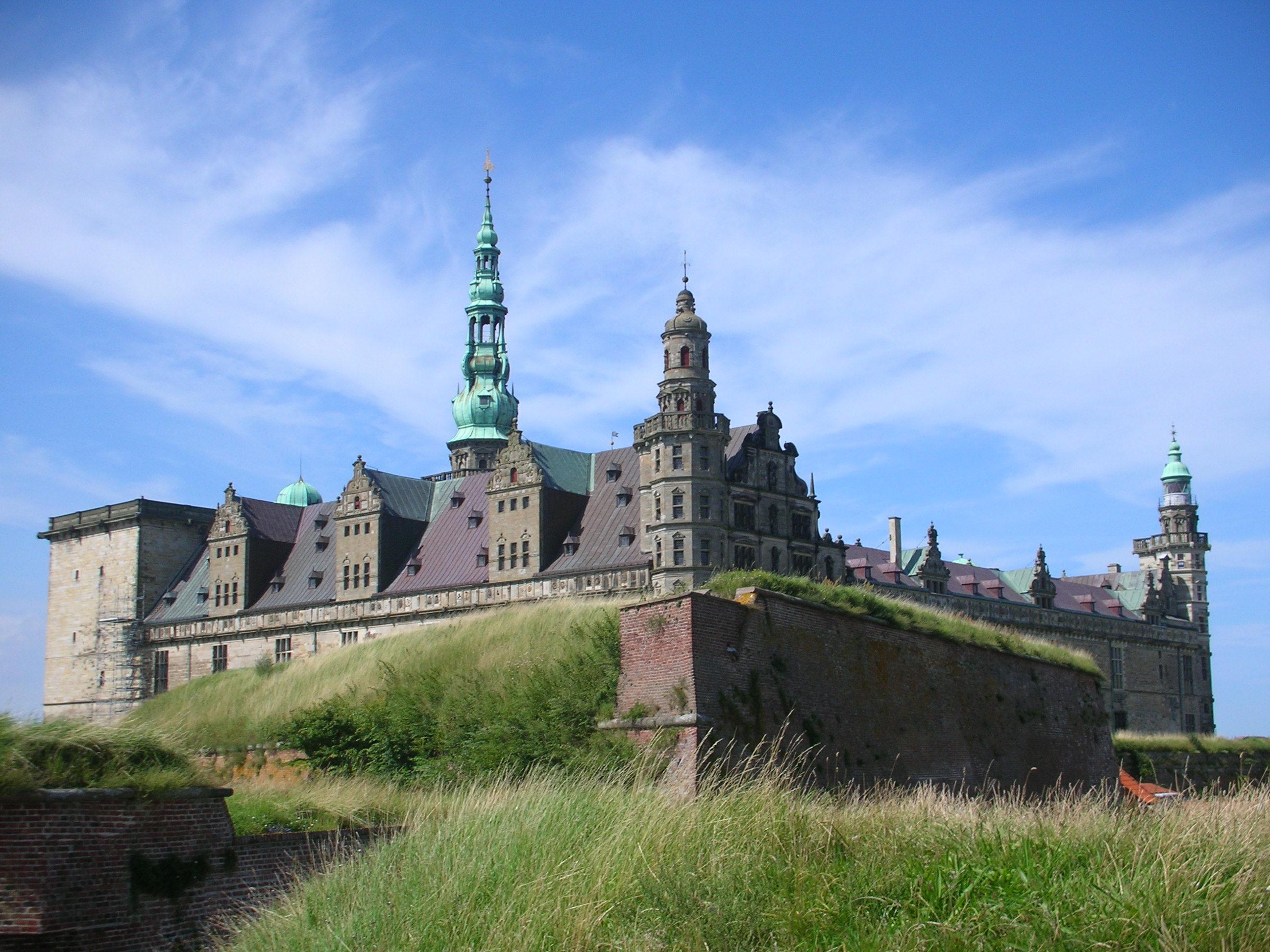
Kronborg Castle in Denmark

Hans Hendrik van Paesschen (c. 1510–1582) was a Flemish architect, based in Antwerp, who designed high-style classical buildings in many countries of Northern Europe.

== Life and times ==
While Italy had the architecture of Andrea Palladio and France that of Philibert Delorme, a contemporary of theirs, Hans Hendrik van Paesschen, was designing equally beautiful buildings in northern Europe. One of the reasons he is so little known is that in each country where he worked his name was spelled differently.

After presumably receiving his training in Italy, Paesschen established himself in Antwerp as an architect and builder, often using the sculptor Cornelis Floris de Vriendt to secure architectural commissions for him. Paesschen worked in Flanders, the Netherlands, England, Wales, north Germany, Denmark, Norway, Sweden, and Königsberg. It is also likely that he designed buildings in northeastern France, Estonia, Latvia and Lithuania, but these have so far not been identified.

In sharp contrast to the gothic and mannerist styles being used at the time in northern Europe, Paesschen often designed buildings in a pure Florentine style, but with a northern flavor. He employed arcaded and colonnaded loggias, domes, and Venetian arches on his best buildings. The majority of his buildings have been destroyed or substantially altered, so his work is known mostly through old pictures. Several generations of his descendants in the Van de Passe family were notable engravers, usually with the surname de Pas or van de Passe.

== Major works attributed to Paesschen ==
- 1549ff: Triumphal gates, Antwerp and elsewhere
- 1559ff: Fortifications, Antwerp
- 1559: Fortifications, Alvsborg, Norway
- c.1559: Villa with dome, London
- c.1560: Queen's Loggia, Windsor
- c.1560: Duke of Brabant's Palace, Brussels
- c.1560: Steelyard, London
- 1561: Raadhuis, Antwerp
- 1561: Gresham House, London
- 1564: Hanseatenhuis, Antwerp
- 1564: Parts of Burghley House, England
- 1564: Loggia, Copthall, England
- 1564: Fortifications, Willemstad, the Netherlands
- 1565: Reformed Church, Willemstad
- 1565: Fortifications, Klundert, the Netherlands
- c.1565: Temple Bar I, London
- 1566: Fortifications, Bohus, Sweden
- 1566: Cathedral altarpiece, Lund, Sweden
- 1566: Royal Exchange, London
- 1567: Fortifications, Akershus, Norway
- 1567: Osterley House, England
- 1567: Bachegraig House, Wales
- 1567: Faringdon Town Hall, England
- 1567: Part of Theobalds, England
- 1568: Town Plan, Frederikstad, Norway
- 1568: Part of Gorhambury, England
- 1570: Part of Rathaus, Lubeck, Germany
- 1571: Selsø Castle, Denmark
- 1574: Part of Kronborg Castle, Denmark
- 1574: Part of University, Copenhagen
- 1576: Uraniborg, Denmark
- 1577: Bathhouse, Hillerod, Denmark
- 1577: Fadeburslangen, Hillerod
- 1578: Vallo Castle, Denmark
- 1579: 76 Stengade, Helsingor, Denmark
