= Timms =

Timms is a surname. Notable people with the surname include:

- Arthur Timms (1914–1970), Australian footballer
- Brian Timms (born 1940), English cricketer
- Charles Gordon Timms (1884–1958), British Army officer and rugby player
- Chris Timms (1947–2004), New Zealand yachtsman
- Colin Timms, English musicologist
- E. V. Timms (1895–1960), Australian novelist and screenwriter
- Edward Timms (1937–2018), academic
- Freddie Timms (1946–2017), Australian artist
- Gene Timms (1932–2014), American politician
- Geoffrey Timms (1903–1982), British mathematician and cryptoanalyst
- Herbert Timms (1890–1973), English cricketer
- Howard Timms (born 1944), British racewalker
- John Timms (1906–1980), English cricketer
- Ken Timms (born 1938), Australian footballer
- Mary Timms (born 1981), Nigerian model
- Matt Timms (born c. 1974), event promoter
- Michele Timms (born 1965), Australian basketballer
- Philip Timms (1874–1973), Canadian photographer
- Richard Timms (born 1986), English cricketer
- Robert Timms (archer) (born 1980), Australian archer
- Robert Timms (1908–1993), Australian entrepreneur
- Sally Timms (born 1959), British singer-songwriter
- Stephen Timms (born 1955), British politician
- Wilfrid Timms (1902–1986), English cricketer

Fictional characters:

- Tony Timms, character in Australian TV series Blue Heelers
- Richard Timms, character from Alan Bennett play and film, The History Boys.
- Reverend Timms, character in British children's TV series Postman Pat

Other:

- Timms Hill, a location in Wisconsin, US
- Timms trap, a type of animal trap
- Tübinger Internet Multimedia Server, one of the first OpenCourseWare initiatives by a major university.

== See also ==
- Timm (disambiguation)
- Trends in International Mathematics and Science Study (TIMSS)
