= Tesdorpf family =

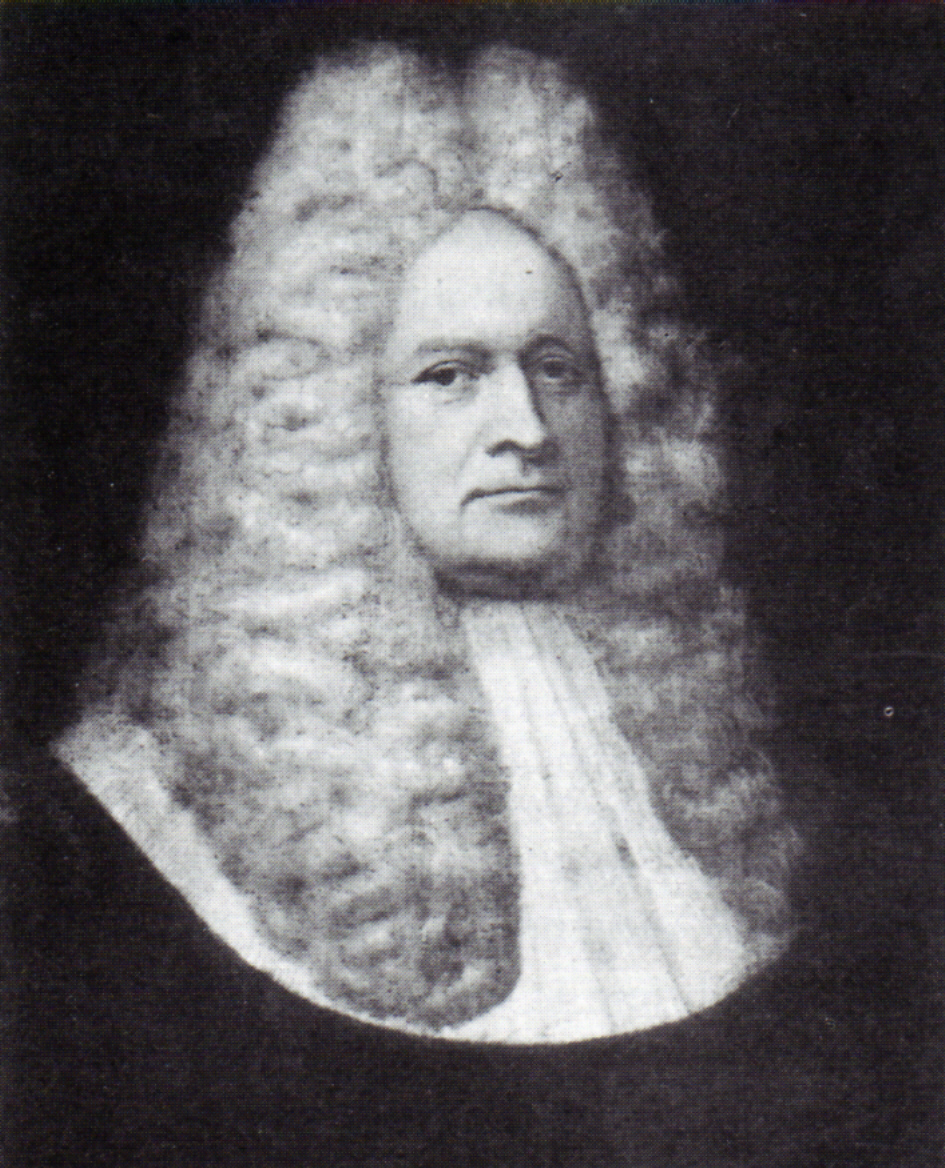
Peter Hinrich Tesdorpf, Mayor of Lübeck

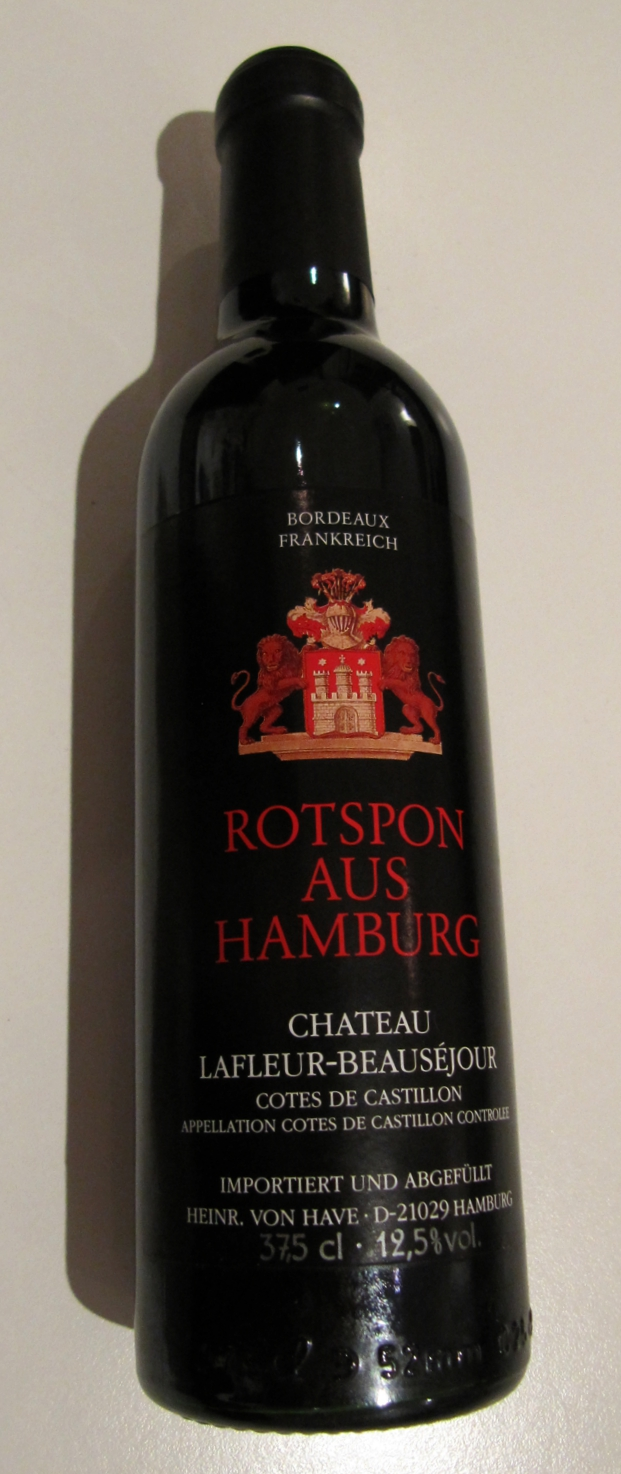
Rotspon Wine

The Tesdorpf family is a political and merchant Hanseaten family from Lübeck and Hamburg Germany. The Tesdorpfs were an old Patrician family in Lübeck before Peter Hinrich Tesdorpf (Kaufmann, 1648) became the mayor of Lübeck in 1715. Peter Hinrich Tesdorpf founded Carl Tesdorpf, the first wine trading house in Germany.

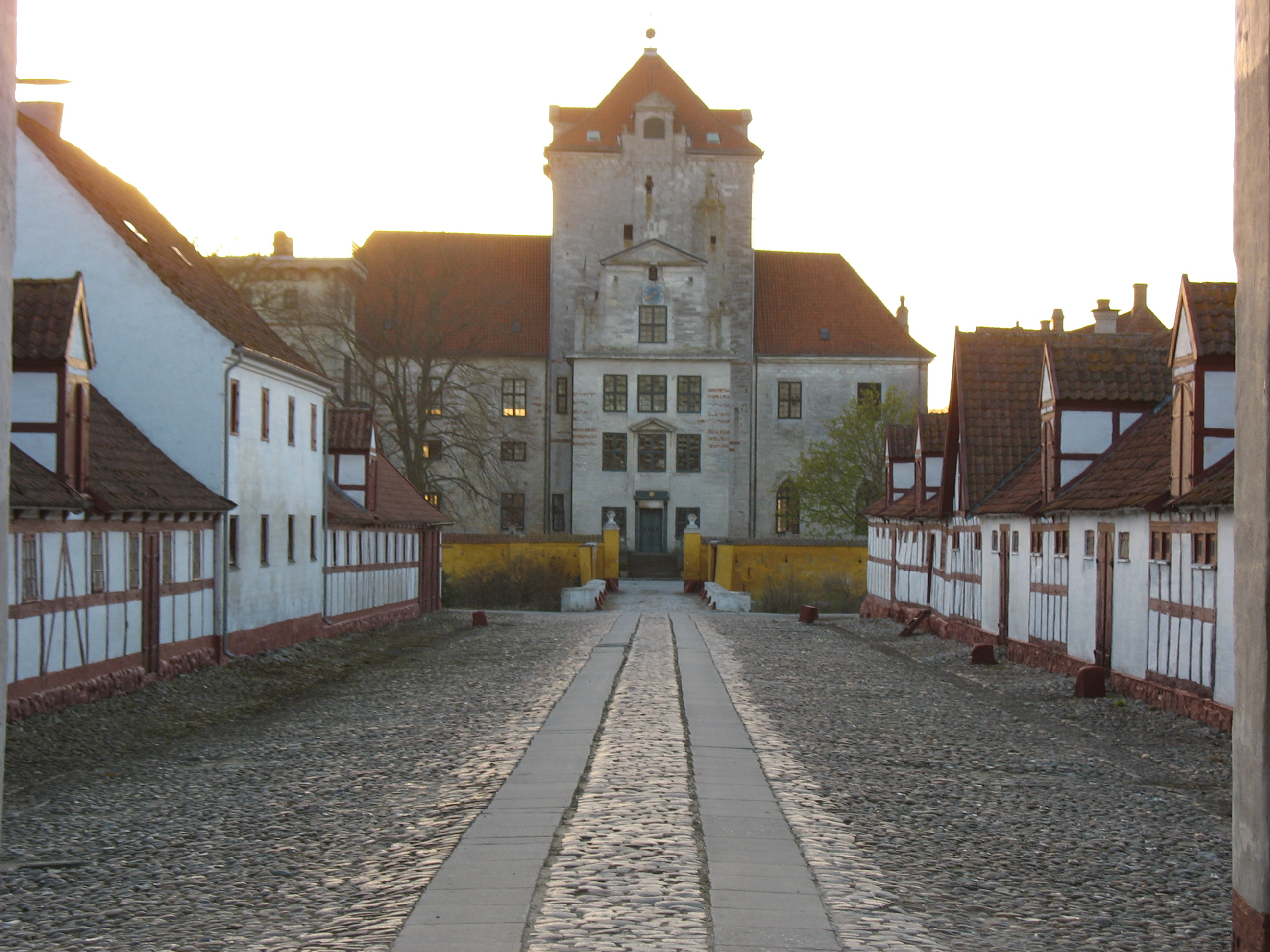
Gjorslev Gods

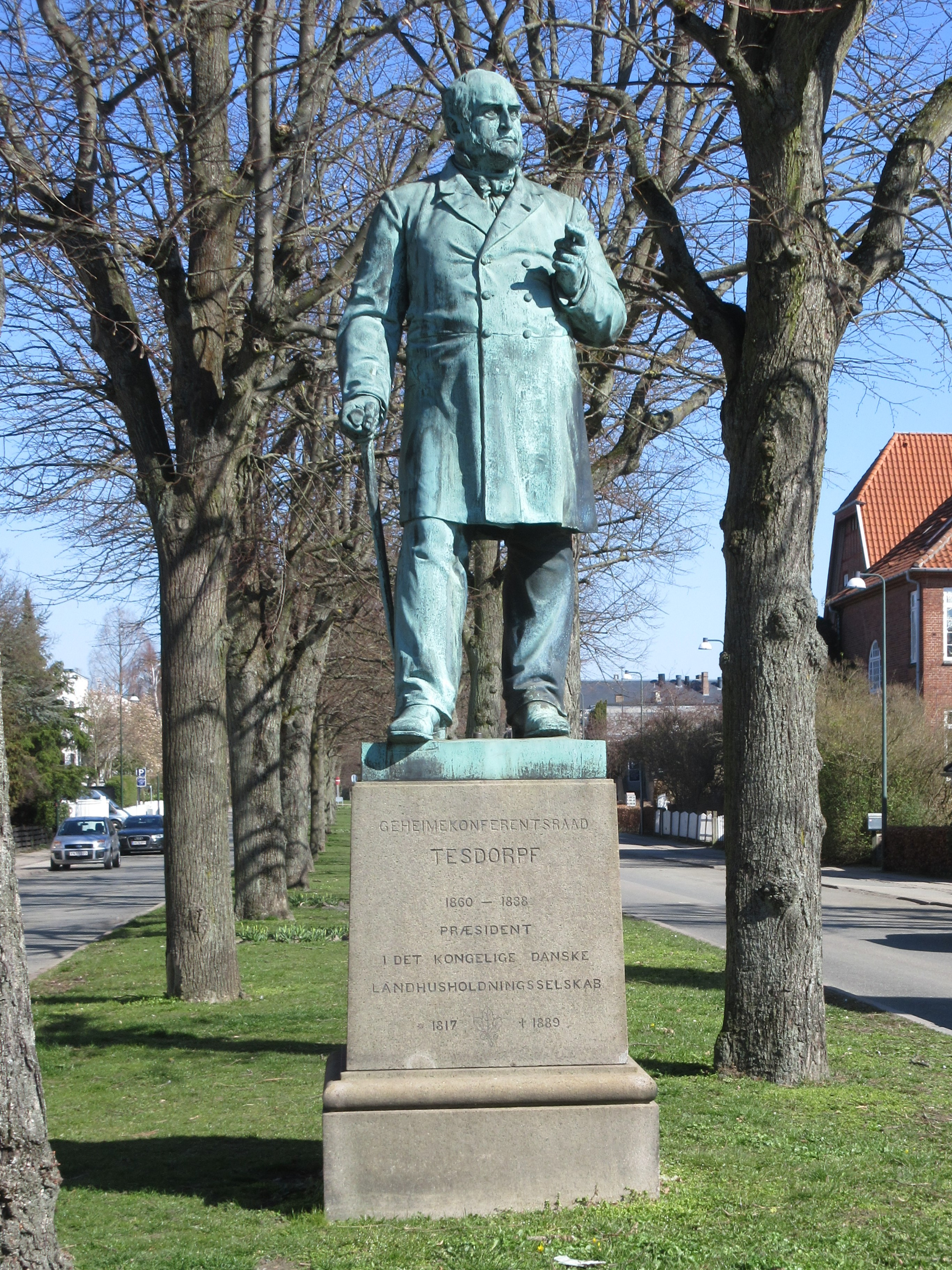
Statue of Edward Tesdorpf, Sculpted by Theobald Stein

Carl Tesdorpf is primarily known for making Rotspon, a French red wine that ages as it is shipped from Bordeaux to Lübeck. The Tesdorpf wine shop was known to supply wine to Germanic and Northern European royalty, as well as Napoleon. In 1999, Carl Tesdorpf was acquired by Hawesko Holding. The Carl Tesdorpf wine shop is also reported to be the oldest wine shop in Germany.

In 1840, Edward Tesdorpf moved to the island of Lolland in Denmark, where he became a farmer, landowner, and sugar manufacturer. Many of the estates that Edward and his son Adolph Tesdorpf acquired have remained in the Tesdorpf family, including Orupgaard, Pandebjerg, Gjedsergaard, Ny Kirstineberg, Gjorslev and Søholm (Magleby Stevns Sogn).

== Germany ==
- Adolph Tesdorpf
- Burkhard Tesdorpf
- Ebba Tesdorpf
- Gustav Theodor Tesdorpf
- Ilse Tesdorpf-Edens
- Johann Matthaeus Tesdorpf
- Ludwig Tesdorpf
- Louise Tesdorpf
- Oscar Louis Tesdorpf
- Peter Hinrich Tesdorpf (Kaufmann, 1648)
- Peter Hinrich Tesdorpf (Kaufmann, 1681)
- Peter Hinrich Tesdorpf (Kaufmann, 1712)
- Peter Hinrich Tesdorpf (Kaufmann, 1751)
- Therese Tesdorpf-Sickenberger

== Denmark ==
- Edward Tesdorpf
- Frederik Tesdorpf
- Adolph Tesdorpf
- Edward Tesdorpf (politician)
