= Bøtø Nor Pumping Station =

Building in Væggerløse, Zeeland, Denmark

- Bøtø Nor Pumpestation
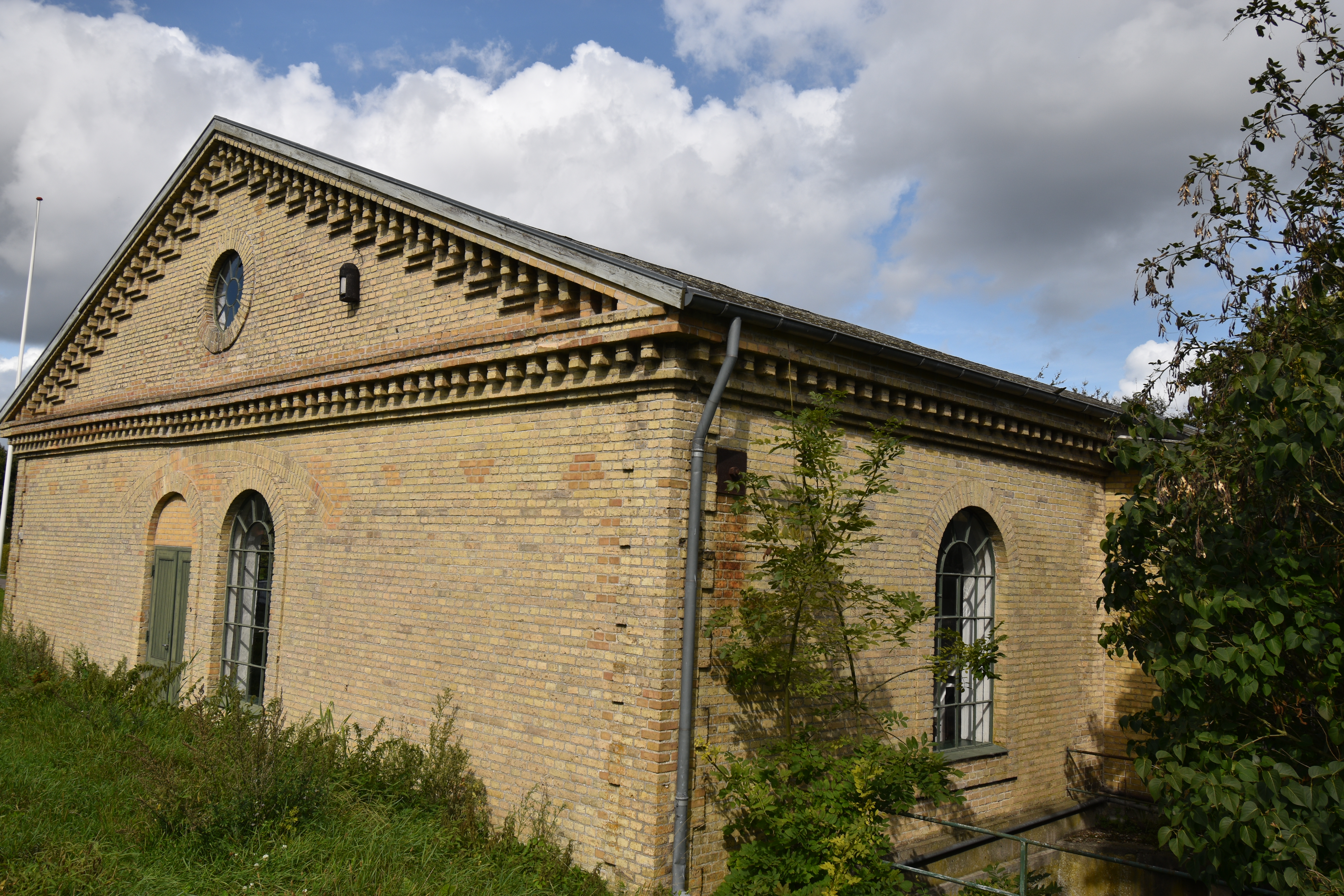
- Interactive map of the Bøtø Nor Pumping Station area

General information
- Location: Møllesøvej 2, 4873 Væggerløse, Denmark
- Coordinates: 54°40′56.96″N 11°54′31.07″E
- Renovated: 1871

Bøtø Nor Pumping Station was constructed in 1871 in connection with the reclamation of Bøtø Nor on southern Falster, Denmark. The building was listed in the Danish registry of protected buildings and places in 1970. It now houses an exhibition about the enterprise and the 1872 Baltic Sea flood.

== History ==
=== Background and first proposals ===
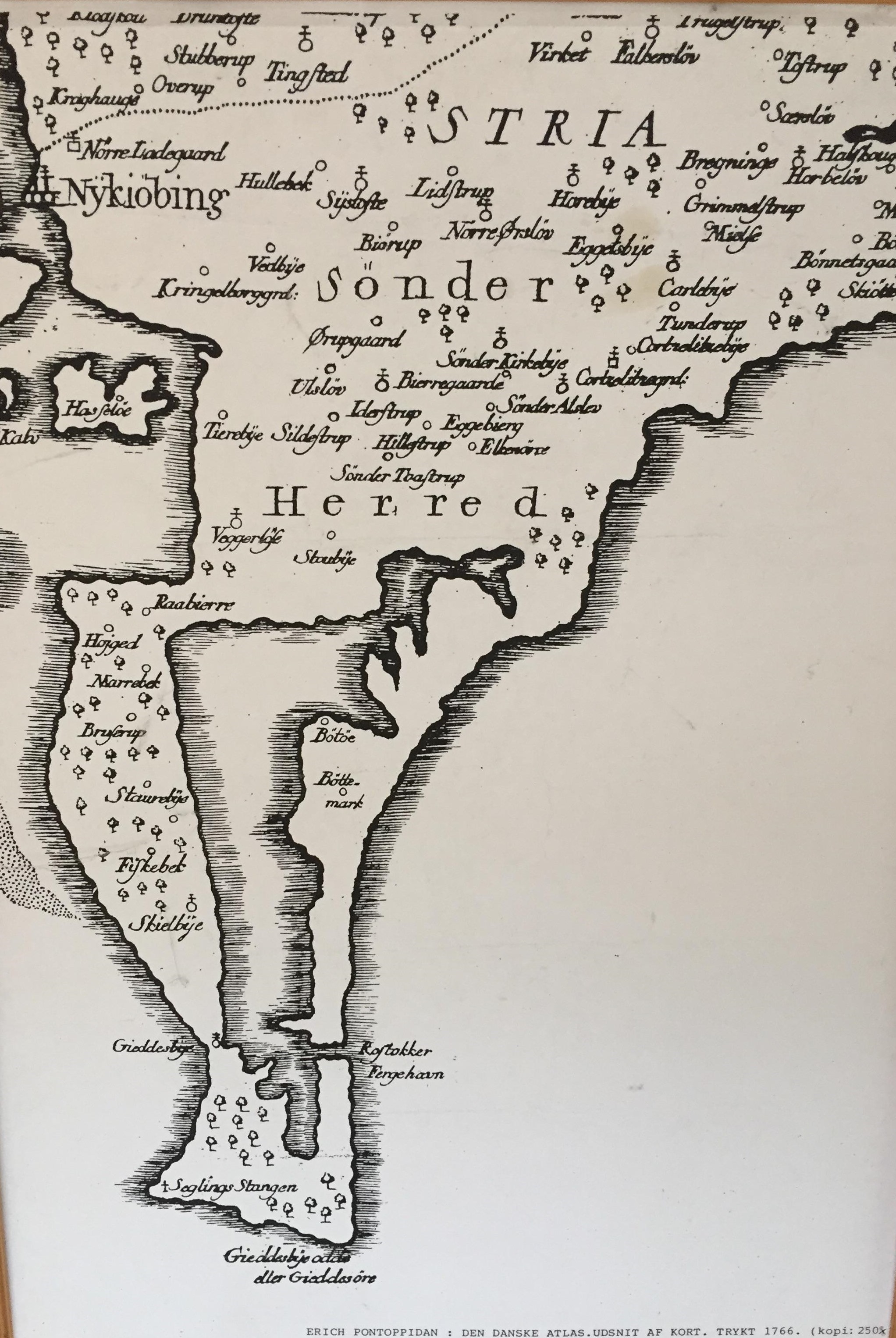
Bøtø Nor seen on a map detail from 1766

Bøtø Nor was a coastal lagoon, 15 km long, 1 km wide and up to 2.8 m in depth, which had been formed by natural sand deposition along the southeast coast of Falster.

Some sources state that the idea of reclaiming Bøtø Nor was first presented in 1762 and that an unsuccessful attempt to drain the most shallow part of it was made in 1790. Other sources state that the reclamation of Bøtø Nor was first proposed by Niels Ditlev Riegels in 1795 but that his proposal was not realized.

=== Tesdorpf's project ===
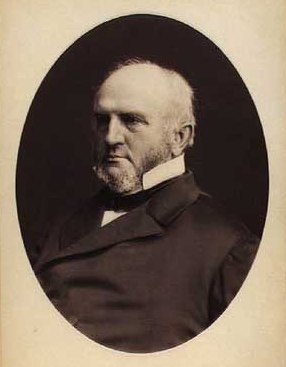
Edward Tesdorpf

In 1860, the plans were revived by Edward Tesdorpf. Tesdorpf, a prominent politician and president of the Danish Agricultural Society (Landhusholdningsselskabet), was the owner of Orupgaard and Gjedsergaard. He envisioned the project as a model for other similar projects in other parts of the country. He was the driving force behind the foundation of I/S Bøtø Nors Udgravnings- og Inddæmnings-selskab. A dyke, 19 km long and 3 m tall, was built along the coast and a system of canals was also constructed. Bøtø Nor Pumping Station was built at Marrebæk in 1870 and 1871. It contained a Burmeister & Wain steam engine and a wooden Archimedes' screw.

The 1872 Baltic Sea flood made landfall with devastating impact to the sea barrier, including multiple breaches, but the pumping station survived. Extensive work to rebuild and raise the dike was subsequently undertaken in 1873—75.

=== 20th-century alterations ===
The pumping station was modernized in 1901. The old B&W steam engine was replaced by a new Atlas engine. The wooden Archimedes' screw was replaced by an Archimedes's screw made out of steel. An additional Archimedes' screw operated by a wind wheel was also constructed at this point but removed again in 1919.

A small new pumping station for supplementing the old one during peak time situations was constructed in 1949.

The old Bøtø Nor pumping station was decommissioned when a new one was inaugurated at an adjacent site in 1967. The new pumping station was constructed at a cost of DKK 2,000,000. The first of six electrical pumps was started on 15 November 1979.

== Today ==
The building has later been restored and converted into a working museum.

The new pumping station is located immediately to the southwest of the old building. It has a capacity of 6,400 L/second or 55.2 million L/day. It drains the land to a depth of 3.5 metres.
