= Tesdorpf =

Tesdorpf is a surname. Notable people with the surname include:

Denmark

- Edward Tesdorpf, landowner and sugar manufacturer

Germany

- Tesdorpf Family
- Burkhard Tesdorpf
- Ebba Tesdorpf
