= Nykøbing Latin School =

Former Latin school in Denmark

Coordinates: 54°46′07″N 11°52′00″E

Nykøbing Latin School (Danish: Nykøbing Latinskole) is a former Latin school situated on Slotsgade in central Nykøbing Falster, Denmark. The building was constructed as the private home of a wealthy merchant in 1786. It housed Nyjøbing Latin School from 1808 to 1953. It was decommissioned when the new Nykøbing Cathedral School on Poul Martin Møllervej was inaugurated. The building in Slotsgade was later used as police station from 1957 to 2007 and has now been converted into apartments. It was listed in the Danish registry of protected buildings and places in 1945.

== History ==
=== Origins ===
The building was constructed in 1786 for merchant and landowner Christian Hincheldey. In the mid-1760s, he had purchased the estates Kringelborg and Orupgård. Many of the bricks for his new townhouse came from the abandoned Nykøbing Slot, which had been sold by the crown in 1763. One of the buyers was Christian Hincheldey's brother Hans Bergeshagen.

=== Latin school: 1808–1957 ===
Christian Hincheldey died in 1793. His widow, Laurentia, kept the property after her husband's death. In 1807, she sold it to Nykøbing Latin School for 15,000 Danish rigsdaler. The school traced its history back to the 15th century. It had until then been located in the basement of the former Nykøbing Priory (later town hall). The new school in Slotsgade was inaugurated in 1808.

In 1907 the school was expanded with a new building in the courtyard. The original school building was Danish registry of protected buildings and places in 1945.

Notable former students include Poul Martin Møller (1812), Christian Winther (1815), Peter Freuchen (1904) and Kai Munk (1917).

=== Later history: 1953–present ===
The school building was decommissioned when the new Nykøbing Cathedral School on Poul Martin Møllervej was inaugurated in 1953, and the building was converted into a police station in 1953. The building was decomissiossioned by the police in 2007. The property was subsequently ceded to the state-owned property company Freja Ejendomme and put up for sale. In 2015, it was sold to Sixton Udvikling ApS.. In 2018, it changed hands again when it was acquired by Arkansas ApS. In 2020 it was converted into apartments.
