= Grønsund =

Strait in Denmark

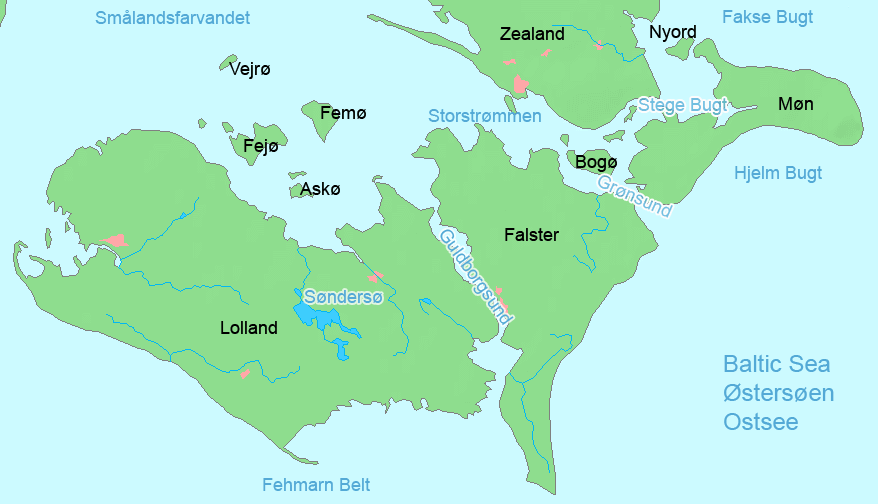
- Grønsund between Falster (SW) and Møn (NE)

- Location within Europe
- Coordinates: 54°54′N 12°5′E
- Type: strait
- Basin countries: Denmark
- Max. width: 4 km (2 mi)
- Min. width: 1 km (1 mi)
- Max. depth: 20 m (66 ft)
- Islands: Møn and Bogø

Grønsund is a strait in Denmark separating the island Falster from the smaller islands of Møn and Bogø. Grønsund is also the name of a locality on the northeast coast of Falster from where the ferries to Møn used to operate. Grønsund Ferry House was built in 1731 and listed in the Danish registry of protected buildings and places in 1950.

== Geography ==
Grønsund's maximum depth is at approx. 20 metres and the width is between 1 - 4 km. Storstrømmen channel is situated to the west and Stege Bugt lies to the north between Zealand and Møn. A ferry crosses the channel in the summertime from Stubbekøbing to Bogø island. Grønsund has several shallow areas, i.e. near Bogø, and has a strong and alternating current.

== Environment ==
Both submersed and riparian vegetation is rich, and the sound is an important breeding area for wildlife and fish. Many shore birds, including cormorants, mute swans, greylag geese, pintails, shovelers, eiders, avocets, several species of waders, as well as gulls and terns are breeding in the area. The porpoise lives in the area.

== History ==
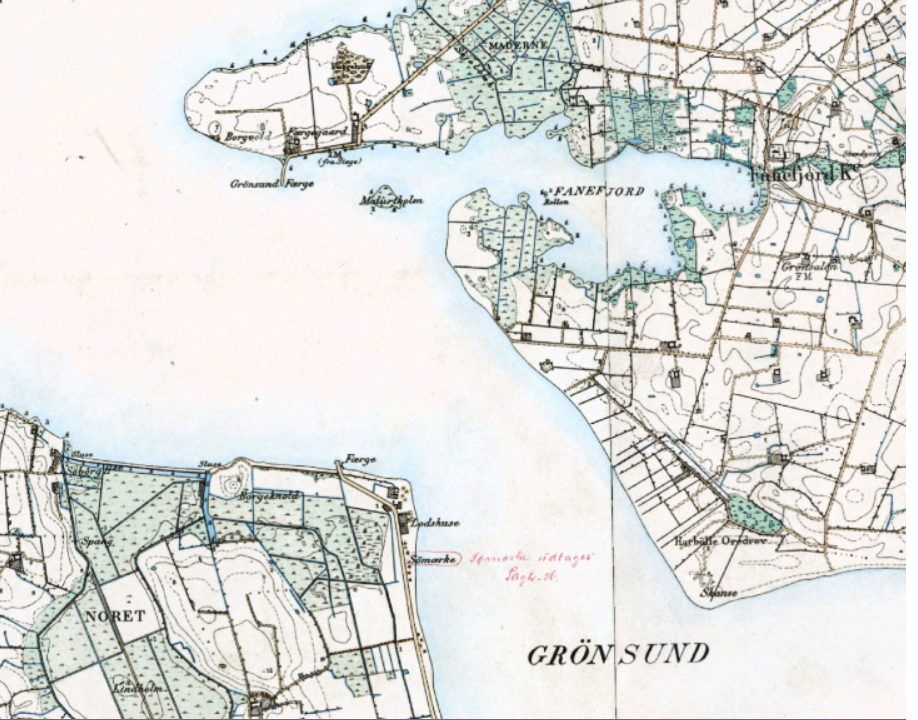
Map detail from the 19th century

Grønsund on Falster was already in the Middle Ages used as a hub for ferry service to Møn. A building known as Borrehuset was constructed at the site in 1705. It was replaced by Grønsund Færgegård in 1731.

=== Oil spill ===
On March 29, 2001, the oil tanker Baltic Carrier collided with the bulk carrier Tern in the western Baltic Sea, near the naval border between Germany and Denmark. 2700 tons of bunker oil leaked from the cargo tanks into the sea, affecting the Danish shoreline, especially Grønsund.

== Sources ==
- Environment report, The “Baltic Carrier” Oil Spill.
- Status and management of important areas for breeding birds at the coasts of Storstrøms County, Denmark.
- Countrymen by Bo Lidegaard

== See also ==
- Geography of Denmark
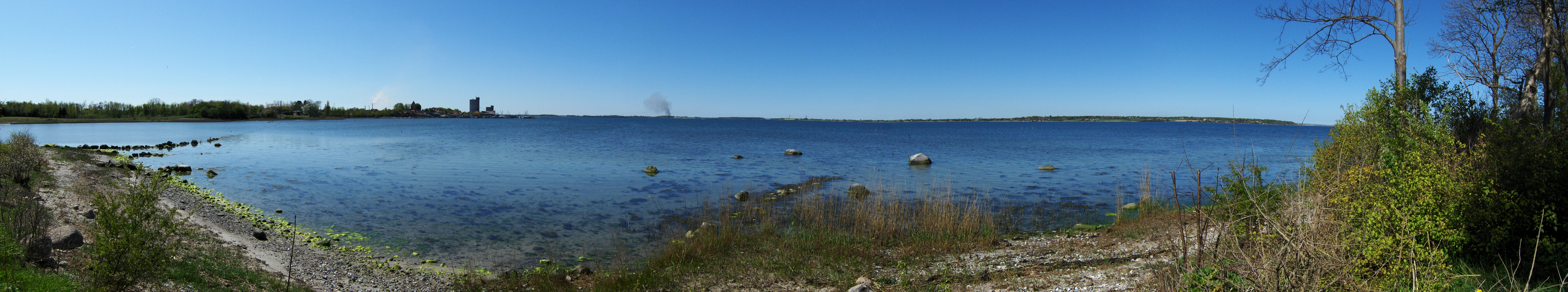
Grønsund from Møn
