= Listed buildings in Guldborgsund Municipality =

This is a list of listed buildings in Guldborgsund Municipality, Denmark.

== The list ==
=== 4800 Nykøbing F ===
Listing name	Image	Location	Coordinates	Summary
Bishop's House		Østre Alle 2, 4800 Nykøbing F	54°45′45.42″N 11°52′40.74″E	Main building from 1850 by Michael Gottlieb Bindesbøll
Bishop's House		Østre Alle 2, 4800 Nykøbing F	54°45′45.42″N 11°52′40.74″E	Arcade and one-storey building from 1910
Corselitze		Tromnæs Alleen 2C, 4800 Nykøbing F	54°46′5.21″N 12°1′10.81″E	Neoclassical main building from 1775 to 1777 possiblt designed by Andreas Kirkerup
Corselitze		Tromnæs Alleen 2C, 4800 Nykøbing F	54°46′5.21″N 12°1′10.81″E	The south wing of Kavalerfløjeb /staff wing) from the second half of the 18th century
Corselitze		Tromnæs Alleen 2C, 4800 Nykøbing F	54°46′5.21″N 12°1′10.81″E	Connecting wing between the main building and Kavalerfløjen from the 1830s
Corselitze		Tromnæs Alleen 2D, 4800 Nykøbing F	54°46′4.66″N 12°1′10.79″E	The western part of Kavalerfløjen (staff wing) from the second half of the 18th century
Corselitze		Tromnæs Alleen 2E, 4800 Nykøbing F	54°46′4.21″N 12°1′12.1″E	The central part of Kavalerfløjen (staff wing) from the second half of the 18th century
Corselitze		Tromnæs Alleen 2F, 4800 Nykøbing F	54°46′6.05″N 12°1′13.18″E	The eastern part of Kavalerfløjen (staff wing) from the second half of the 18th century
Corselitze		Tromnæs Alleen 2, 4800 Nykøbing F	54°46′3.71″N 12°1′13.09″E	Stables from 1780
Det Wichfeldske Enkehuus		Lille Kirkestræde 9, 4800 Nykøbing F	54°45′55.01″N 11°52′6.17″E	Building from c. 1828
Ejegod Windmill		Ejegodvej 4A, 4800 Nykøbing F	54°46′48.2″N 11°51′55.31″E	Smock mill from c. 1850
Ejegod Windmill		Ejegodvej 6, 4800 Nykøbing F	54°46′49.21″N 11°51′55.21″E	Residential building from c. 1850
Ejegod Windmill		Ejegodvej 6, 4800 Nykøbing F	54°46′49.21″N 11°51′55.21″E	Outbuilding from c. 1850
Falsters Minder (The Czar's House)		Langgade 2, 4800 Nykøbing F	54°46′3.79″N 11°52′0.5″E	Half-timbered building from c. 1700
Falsters Minder (The Czar's House)		Langgade 2, 4800 Nykøbing F	54°46′3.79″N 11°52′0.5″E	
Frisegade 43,		Frisegade 43, 4800 Nykøbing F	54°45′49.49″N 11°52′8.02″E	Half-timbered building from 1761
Frisegade 43,		Frisegade 45A, 4800 Nykøbing F	54°45′49.2″N 11°52′8.36″E	Warehouse from 1845 to 1846 in the courtyard to the rear
Gammel Kirstineberg		Kraghave Gaabensevej 95A, 4800 Nykøbing F	54°47′43.74″N 11°52′9.13″E	Eastern side wing from the 18th century
Gammel Kirstineberg		Kraghave Gaabensevej 97, 4800 Nykøbing F	54°47′44.95″N 11°52′7.91″E	Main building from the 18th centurye
Generalens Lysthus		Tromnæs Alleen 10, 4800 Nykøbing F	54°45′40.36″N 12°2′41.74″E	Thatched cottage in Tromnæs Forest from 1780 to 1790 by Andreas Kirkerup
Guldborgvej 51		Guldborgvej 51, 4990 Sakskøbing		
Guldborgvej 51		Guldborgvej 51, 4990 Sakskøbing		
Guldborgvej 51		Guldborgvej 51, 4990 Sakskøbing		
Guldborgvej 51		Guldborgvej 51, 4990 Sakskøbing		
Karleby Rectory		Tunderup Strandvej 1, 4800 Nykøbing F	54°47′26.69″N 12°1′51.4″E	East wing of three-winged, half-timbered complex: Residential wing probably from 1766 to 1770
Karleby Rectory		Tunderup Strandvej 1, 4800 Nykøbing F	54°47′26.69″N 12°1′51.4″E	North wing of three-winged, half-timbered complex: Stables
Karleby Rectory		Tunderup Strandvej 1, 4800 Nykøbing F	54°47′26.69″N 12°1′51.4″E	West wing of three-winged, half-timbered complex: Barn2
Klosterfløjen (Præstebolig)		Kirkepladsen 3, 4800 Nykøbing F	54°45′56.16″N 11°52′9.32″E	Late Gothic former west wing of the Franciscan monastery which has later been adapted
Kringelborg		Kringelborg Alle 11, 4800 Nykøbing F	54°45′30.22″N 11°54′10.65″E	Manor house from the late 18th century
Langgade 16-18		Langgade 16, 4800 Nykøbing F	54°46′0.9″N 11°52′0.98″E	Two townhouses of which No. 16 dates from c. 1800 and No. 18 dates from 1580
Nykøbing Abbey		Klosterstræde 1B, 4800 Nykøbing F	54°45′54.16″N 11°52′9.56″E	Vester Kloster 1828
Nykøbing Abbey		Klosterstræde 1B, 4800 Nykøbing F	54°45′54.16″N 11°52′9.56″E	Half-timbered outbuilding
Nykøbing Abbey		Klosterstræde 3, 4800 Nykøbing F	54°45′53.69″N 11°52′11.42″E	Sygeklosteret: Building from 1895
Nykøbing Abbey		Klosterstræde 5, 4800 Nykøbing F	54°45′52.75″N 11°52′10.03″E	Forstanderbolig: One-storey residential building from 1828
Nykøbing Abbey		Klosterstræde 7, 4800 Nykøbing F	54°45′51.22″N 11°52′11.17″E	Frederik VII""s Kloster: Building from 1862
Nykøbing Abbey		Klosterstræde 9, 4800 Nykøbing F	54°45′50.11″N 11°52′12.1″E	Christian VIII's Kloster: Building from 1848
Nykøbing Abbey		Voldgade 8, 4800 Nykøbing F	54°45′50.78″N 11°52′15.25″E	Christian IX""s Kloster: Building from 1876
Nykøbing Castle: Former stables		Rosenvænget 12, 4800 Nykøbing F	54°44′9.11″N 11°52′0.1″E	Former stables from 1635 by Hans van Steenwinckel the Younger
Nykøbing Latin School		Vestergade 15, 4800 Nykøbing F	54°46′7.33″N 11°51′56.51″E	Two-winged school building from 1786
Priorskov		Priorskov 11, 4800 Nykøbing F	54°44′1.65″N 11°50′31.93″E	Granary from the 17th century
Ritmestergården		Frisegade 1, 4800 Nykøbing F	54°45′57.16″N 11°52′2.69″E	Ikder house altered in c. 1800 with Renaissance-style wing from c. 1620 along Kirkestræde
Slotsgade 22		Slotsgade 22A, 4800 Nykøbing F	54°44′9.11″N 11°52′0.1″E	Building from c. 1825

=== 4840 Nørre Alslev ===
Listing name	Image	Location	Coordinates	Summary
Gåbense Færgegård		Gåbense Strandvej 61, 4840 Nørre Alslev	54°56′37.96″N 11°52′36.07″E	Three-winged ferry inn from the 18th to 19th century
Lundby Windmill		Lundbyvej 44, 4840 Nørre Alslev	54°51′53.51″N 11°50′2.68″E	Windmill from 1856
Orehoved Lighthouse		Havnegade 18, 4840 Nørre Alslev	54°57′36.44″N 11°51′6.11″E	Lighthouse from 1895 which was heightened in 1932
Vennerslund		Vennerslundsvej 15, 4840 Nørre Alslev	54°51′21.61″N 11°48′8.84″E	Old main building from c. 1770
Vennerslund		Vennerslundsvej 19, 4840 Nørre Alslev	54°51′21.69″N 11°48′5.16″E	The new main building from 1845 by O.M. Glahn
Vester Kippinge Rectory		Egensevej 49, 4840 Nørre Alslev	54°54′33.91″N 11°46′22.22″E	Rectory from 1840

=== 4850 Stubbekøbing ===
Listing name	Image	Location	Coordinates	Summary
Grønsund Færgegård		Gl. Færgevej 6, 4850 Stubbekøbing	54°53′9.01″N 12°7′9.59″E	Part of residential building from 1731 and later
Grønsund Færgegård		Gl. Færgevej 6, 4850 Stubbekøbing	54°53′9.01″N 12°7′9.59″E	Part of residential building from 1731 and later
Grønsund Færgegård		Gl. Færgevej 6, 4850 Stubbekøbing	54°53′9.01″N 12°7′9.59″E	Stable for travelers from c. 1860
Trojel House		Vestergade 16, 4850 Stubbekøbing	54°53′25.95″N 12°2′25.94″E	Townhouse from the 18th century
Vestergade 43		Vestergade 43, 4850 Stubbekøbing	54°48′2.09″N 12°2′17.69″E	House from 1847 probably built by af H. Thrane

=== 4863 Eskilstrup ===
Listing name	Image	Location	Coordinates	Summary
Torkilstrup Windmill		Torkilstrupvej 10A, 4863 Eskilstrup	54°52′7.73″N 11°55′46.01″E	Stub mill from 1743
Torkilstrup Rectory		Torkilstrupvej 14, 4863 Eskilstrup	54°52′15.94″N 11°55′50.59″E	Three-winged rectory from 1761

=== 4871 Horbelev ===
Listing name	Image	Location	Coordinates	Summary
Bregninge School		Bregningevej 43, 4871 Horbelev	54°48′52.06″N 12°4′27.4″E	School building from 1805
Bregninge School		Bregningevej 43, 4871 Horbelev	54°48′52.06″N 12°4′27.4″E	Outbuilding from 1805
Moseby Rectory		Lyremosen 1, 4871 Horbelev	54°50′22.12″N 12°6′16.96″E	Half-timbered, thatched west wing of four-winged complex
Moseby Rectory		Hesnæsvej 56, 4871 Horbelev	54°50′22.8″N 12°6′18.29″E	Residential east wing with two appendices
Moseby Rectory		Hesnæsvej 56, 4871 Horbelev	54°50′22.8″N 12°6′18.29″E	Half-timbered north wing with stables2
Moseby Rectory		Hesnæsvej 56, 4871 Horbelev	54°50′22.8″N 12°6′18.29″E	Half-timbered, thatched northwing with stables

=== 4873 Væggerløse ===
Listing name	Image	Location	Coordinates	Summary
Bøtø Nor Pumping Station		Møllesøvej 2, 4873 Væggerløse	54°40′56.96″N 11°54′31.06″E	Pumping station from 1871
Stouby Windmill		Stovbyvej 19A, 4873 Væggerløse	54°42′54.83″N 11°53′57.67″E	Stub mill from c. 1750 which was moved to its present location in 1790

=== 4874 Gedser ===
Listing name	Image	Location	Coordinates	Summary
Bøtøgård Plantørbolig		Bøtøgårdsvej 23, 4874 Gedser	54°36′43.24″N 11°57′44.93″E	House from c. 1880
Gjedsergaard		Gedsergaard 1, 4874 Gedser	54°38′53.91″N 11°52′56.83″E	Main building from 1767 with extension from c. 1800
Gjedsergaard		Gedsergaard 2, 4874 Gedser	54°48′56.83″N 11°52′55.62″E	Kavalerfløjen: Staff wing from 1767

=== 4880 Nysted ===
Listing name	Image	Location	Coordinates	Summary
Aalholm		Ålholm Parkvej 4, 4880 Nysted	54°39′52.52″N 11°43′23.36″E	Northeastern tower and west wall from the 14th century and eastern wing from 1581 which were all adapted in 1889 by Hans Jørgen Holm
Aalholm		Ålholm Parkvej 4, 4880 Nysted	54°39′52.52″N 11°43′23.36″E	Bjørnehuset
Adelgade 11 and 17: Clausen's Warehouse and Bønnelyche's Warehouse		Adelgade 11, 4880 Nysted	54°40′9.58″N 11°43′43.61″E	Clausen's Warehouse: Half-timbered ware house from 1807
Adelgade 11 and 17: Clausen's Warehouse and Bønnelyche's Warehouse		Adelgade 18B, 4880 Nysted	54°40′7.42″N 11°43′45.34″E	Bønnelyche's Warehouse: Warehouse from 1851
Adelgade 23		Adelgade 23, 4880 Nysted	54°40′5.72″N 11°43′43.41″E	Townhouse from 1870
Adelgade 23		Adelgade 23, 4880 Nysted	54°40′5.72″N 11°43′43.41″E	Parallel building in the courtyard to the west from 1872
Adelgade 28 B		Adelgade 28B, 4880 Nysted	54°40′5.74″N 11°43′42.68″E	Townhouse from the first half of the 17th century
Adelgade 40		Adelgade 42, 4880 Nysted	54°40′3.13″N 11°43′42.48″E	Warehouse originally dating from some time between 1781 and 1791 but altered in 1928
Adelgade 80: Emil Aarestrup House		Adelgade 80, 4880 Nysted	54°39′55.26″N 11°43′50.45″E	House from the 18th century which was adapted in c. 1800 with southern side wing from c. 1800 and northern side wing from before 1791
Bramsløkke		Bramsløkkevej 7A, 4880 Nysted	54°43′46.54″N 11°39′37.51″E	Manor house from c. 1700
Fiskergade 12		Fiskergade 12, 4880 Nysted	54°39′46.75″N 11°43′56.38″E	Townhouse from before 1761
Fiskergade 12		Fiskergade 12, 4880 Nysted	54°39′46.75″N 11°43′56.38″E	Side wing from before 1761
Gammel Torv 2		Gl Torv 2, 4880 Nysted	54°39′51.47″N 11°43′55.76″E	Townhouse from 1831 which was adapted in 1922 by Johannes Holck
Gammel Torv 2		Gl Torv 2, 4880 Nysted	54°39′51.47″N 11°43′55.76″E	Rear and side wing
Gammel Torv 3-7		Gl Torv 3, 4880 Nysted	54°39′51.92″N 11°43′57.08″E	No. 3: Building from 1831
Gammel Torv 3-7		Gl Torv 3, 4880 Nysted	54°39′51.92″N 11°43′57.08″E	No. 5: 1846
Gammel Torv 3-7		Gl Torv 3, 4880 Nysted	54°39′51.92″N 11°43′57.08″E	No. 7: Building from the 17th century
Gammel Torv 3-7		Gl Torv 3, 4880 Nysted	54°39′51.92″N 11°43′57.08″E	Building in the courtyard from 1847
Nysted Smokehouse		Strandvejen 20, 4880 Nysted	54°39′41.16″N 11°43′53.21″E	Smokehouse from 1871
Nysted Water Tower		Ny Østergade 11, 4880 Nysted	54°40′12.1″N 11°43′47.59″E	Water tower from 1912 to 1913 by the architect Alf. Jørgensen and the engineer Georg Jochimsen
Østergade 9A: Borgerstiftelsen		Østergade 9A, 4880 Nysted	54°40′0.52″N 11°43′53.12″E	Building fronting the street from 1877 to 1878
Østergade 9A: Borgerstiftelsen		Østergade 9A, 4880 Nysted	54°40′0.52″N 11°43′53.12″E	Rear wing from 1877 to 1878
Østergade 13		Østergade 13, 4880 Nysted	54°39′58.8″N 11°43′54.77″E	Townhouse from 1876

=== 4990 Sakskøbing ===
Listing name	Image	Location	Coordinates	Summary
Berritzgaard		Kogangen 8, 4990 Sakskøbing	54°49′18.25″N 11°39′56.33″E	Manor house from 1586 possibly designed by Hans van Steenwinckel the Elder
Hotel Saxkjøbing		Torvet 9A, 4990 Sakskøbing	54°47′57.92″N 11°38′4.14″E	Building on the square, former theatre building and halkf-timbered wing on Juniorsgade from c. 1800
Hotel Saxkjøbing		Torvet 9A, 4990 Sakskøbing	54°47′57.92″N 11°38′4.14″E	Building on the square, former theatre building and halkf-timbered wing on Juniorsgade from c. 1800
Juniors Stiftelse,		Juniorsgade 6, 4990 Sakskøbing	54°47′57.79″N 11°38′1.38″E	22-bay, one-storey building with timber framing from 1802
Krenkerup		Krenkerupvej 27, 4990 Sakskøbing	54°46′38.16″N 11°43′43.41″E	Main building from c. 1500-1631
Krenkerup		Krenkerupvej 27, 4990 Sakskøbing	54°40′5.72″N 11°40′11.5″E	Stables from the 17th century and later
Orebygaard		Orebygaard 5, 4990 Sakskøbing	54°49′46.25″N 11°35′47.54″E	Manor house from the 1870s by Ove Petersen with older core
Wichmann House		Brogade 2A, 4990 Sakskøbing	54°53′24.42″N 11°38′9.56″E	House from c.1770-80

=== 4891 Toreby L ===
Listing name	Image	Location	Coordinates	Summary
Fuglsang Manor		Nystedvej 73, 4891 Toreby L	54°43′18.99″N 11°47′51.72″E	Main building from 1868 to 1869 by J.G. Zinn
Fuglsang Manor		Nystedvej 73, 4891 Toreby L	54°43′18.99″N 11°47′51.72″E	pavilion
Fuglsang Manor		Nystedvej 73C, 4891 Toreby L	54°43′26.26″N 11°47′54.52″E	Warehouse from 1845 to 1846 in the courtyard to the rear

=== 4930 Maribo ===
Listing name	Image	Location	Coordinates	Summary
Engestofte		Engestoftevej 95, 4930 Maribo	54°45′45.58″N 11°33′43.03″E	Main building from 1805 to 1807

== Delisted buildings ==
Listing name	Image	Location	Coordinates	Summary
Ønslev Præstegårds Forpagterbolig		Lundbyvej 12, 4863 Eskilstrup	54°51′0.84″N 11°51′4.73″E	
