= Grønsund Færgegård =

Grønsund Ferry House
- Grønsund Færgegård
- Interactive map of the Grønsund Ferry House area

General information
- Location: Gamle Færgevej 6; 4850 Stubbekøbing, Denmark
- Coordinates: 54°53′8.99″N 12°7′9.59″E
- Completed: 1731

Grønsund Færgegård, situated in the northeastern corner of Falster, approximately 5 km east of Stubbekøbing, was for almost 200 years a hub for the ferries between Falster and Møn in southeastern Denmark. Grønsund is the name of the strait between the two islands but also the name of the locality where Grønsund Færgegård is situated. The main building from 1731 and a stable for travellers from 1750 were both listed in the Danish registry of protected buildings and places in 1950. It is now used as a privately owned holiday home. A stone with an inscription commemorates that Marie Grubbe lived at the site.

== History ==
The site was already in the Middle Ages used as a hub for ferries to Møn. A sconce was constructed at the site during the Second Northern War in 1660 to protect the strategically important infrastructure. It was renovated in 1716 and again in 1801 in connection with the war with England. The small ferry harbour was also used for the shipment of timber and agricultural products.

A building known as Borrehuset was constructed at the site in 1705. Marie Grubbe lived in the building with her husband Søren Sørensen Møller (or Søren Ladefoged). The ferry service was at this point most likely operated to the jetty in Gårbølle. Ludvig Holberg sought refuge in the building for a few months when Copenhagen was hit by an outbreak of plague in 1711. Ludvig Holberg briefly mentions his encounter with Grubbe and her husband in his Epistle 89 (1749).

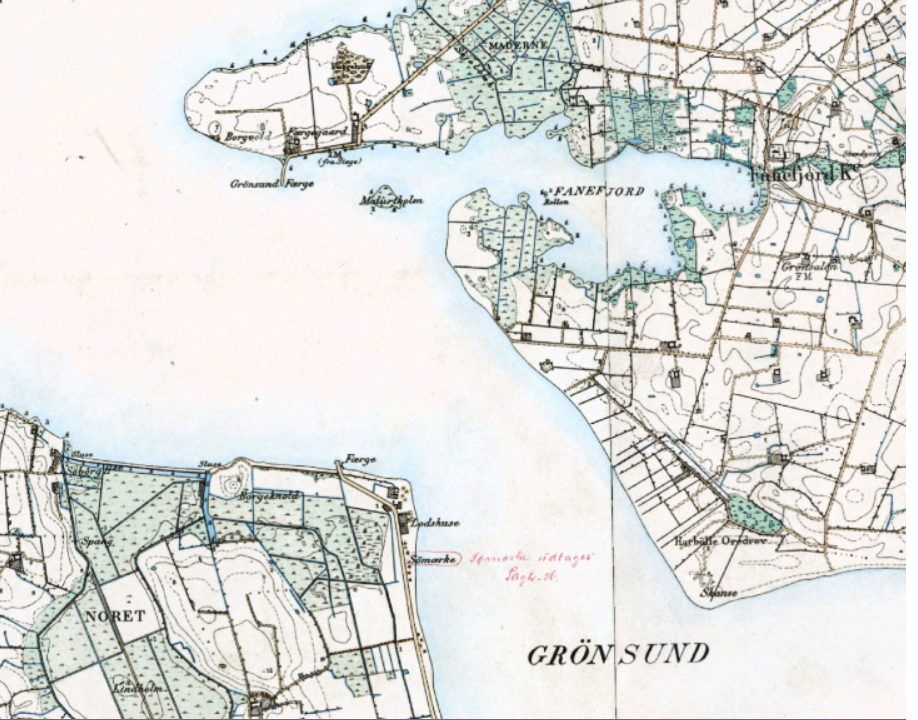
Map detail from the 19th century

The current building at the site was constructed when Borrehuset burned in 1731. The building served both as residence for the ferryman, inn and post office.

From 1826 to 1900, Det Classenske Fideicommis operated a ferry service between Grønsund Færgegård and Borgsted on Møn. They only took passengers, and only as a one-way service. The ferry rights to transport passengers in the opposite direction and to all freight transportation belonged to Grønsund Færgegård on Møn. was from 1826 to 1923 responsible for operating the ferry service. The use of the building as an inn was discontinued in 1879. The building was from 1910 rented out to visitors from Copenhagen in the summer time.

The ferry was finally superseded by a fixed link when the embankment to Bogø and the Møn Bridge was constructed in 1941–42, allowing for much more efficient automobile travel.

In 1900, the ferry service was taken over by Stubbekøbing Dampskibsselskab. Grønsund Færgegård on Møn went bankrupt in 1929. and the operations were then taken over by Præstø County Council. Oræstø County Council wanted to move the ferry service to Stubbekøbing, but Stubbekøbing Dampskibsselskabm, which operated a service to Hårbølle, managed to stop this through a lawsuit in 1933.

On October 2, 1943, the old ferry harbor was used by members of the Danish resistance movement to transport fleeing Danish Jews on fisherman boats to Sweden to escape the German attempt to round up the Danish Jews, as detailed in Bo Lidegaard's book Countrymen.

== Architecture ==
The residential building is oriented east-west and is located on the south side of a yard. It is constructed with timber framing, now lime-washed, and with reed-facing on the two gables and half of the north side. It has a half-hipped, thatched roof. On the south side of the building is a two-winged main entrance.

The stable is orientated north-south and is located on the east side of the yard. It is built in brick and stands on a foundation of granite stone. The walls are finished by a brick cornice. It has a half-hipped thatched roof.

== Today ==
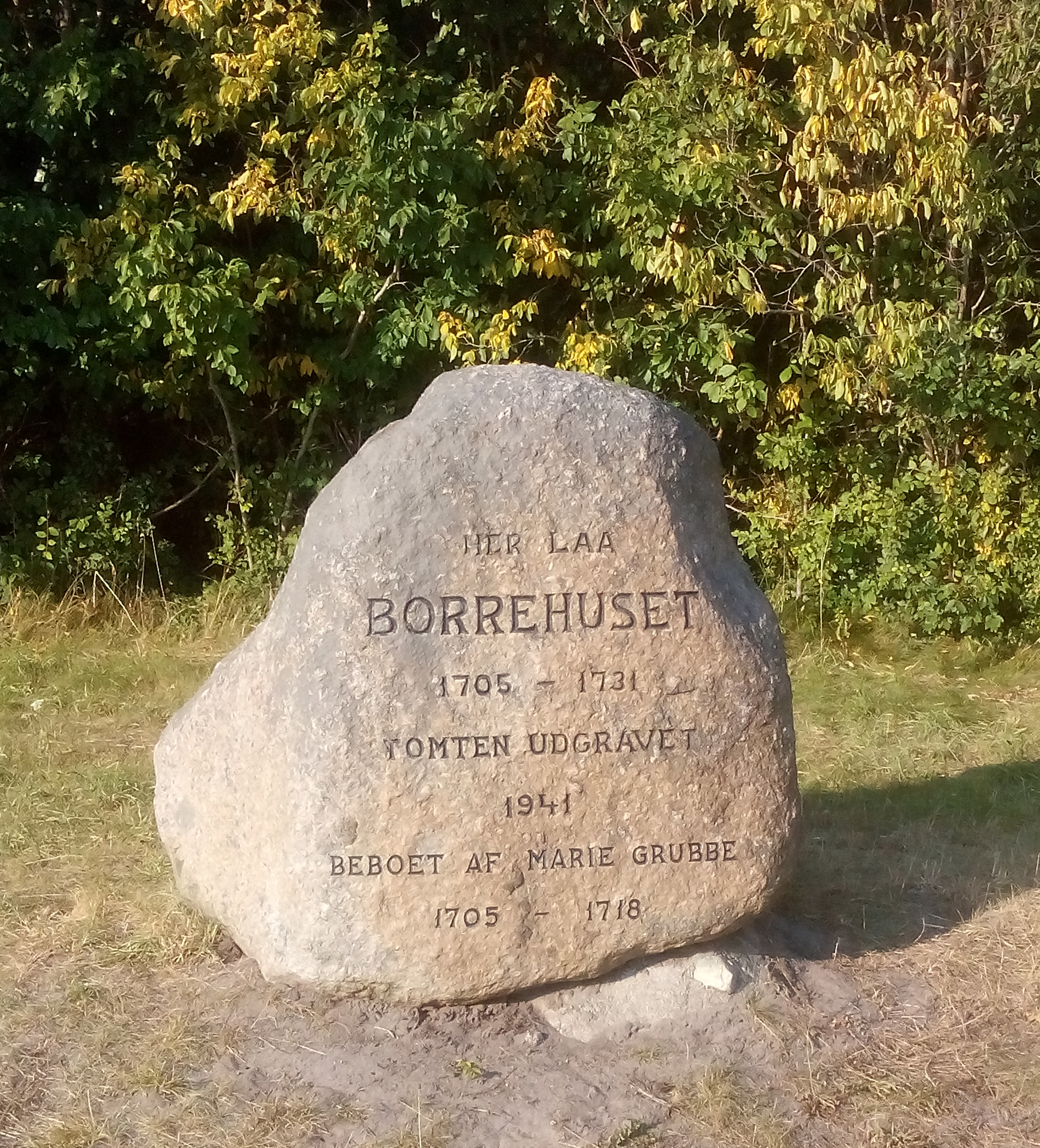
Stone commemorating that Marie Grubbe used to live at the site

The house is today used as a holiday home. It has been divided into two units. On a lawn located immediately to the west of the building is a stone with an inscription commemorating that Borrehuset once stood at the site. The inscription mentions that it was constructed in 1705, that the site was subject to archeological excavations in 1942, and that Marie Grubbe used to live in it.

== See also ==
- Gåbense Færgegård
