= Christian Hincheldey =

Danish merchant and landowner

Christian Hincheldey (6 March 1729 – 7 January 1793) was a Danish merchant and landowner on the island of Falster. He owned the estates Kringelborg and Orupgård . The building which would later become known as Nykøbing Latin School was constructed for him in 1786.

== Early lige ==
Hincheldey was born in Nykøbing to councilman and merchant Edvard Hincheldey (died 1775) and Karen née Høy (died 1767). The father was originally from Lübeck.

== Career and property ==
Hincheldey became one of the most successful merchants in the area. In c. 1766, he purchased Kringelborg and Orupgård with the ambition of turning them into a barony. This ambition had not yet been realized at the time of his death. He was known as a brutal landlord and was involved in many disputes with the farmers on his estates. In 1786, he constructed a new townhouse in Slotsgade. It was partly built with bricks from Nykøbing Slot.

== Personal life and legacy ==
He married on 9 Jule 1760 to Mette Helene Tersling (died 29 August 1770). After her death, on 22 February 1775, he married Laurentia Hofgaard (8 April 1755 – 5 August 1841), daughter of justitsråd and vice mayor of Copenhagen Gerhard Hofgaard and Margrethe née Moss. Hincheldey was awarded the title of justitsråd in 1784. He died on 7 January 1793.

His former townhouse in Slotsgade housed Nykøbing Latin School from 1808 to 1953 and was later used as police station from 1957 to 2007. It has now been converted into apartments. The building was listed in the Danish registry of protected buildings and places in 1945. In 1809, his widow sold Orupgård to Charles August Selby.
