= Pandebjerg =

Manor house on the island of Falster in southeastern Denmark

- Interactive map of the Pandebjerg area

General information
- Architectural style: Neoclassical
- Location: Falster, Denmark
- Coordinates: 54°48′7″N 11°48′39″E
- Completed: 1900
- Client: Adolph Valdemar Tesdorpf

Design and construction
- Architect: Henrik Christopher Glahn

Pandebjerg is a manor house on the island of Falster in southeastern Denmark. It has been owned by members of the Tesdorpf family since 1878. The current main building is from 1900.

== History ==
Pandebjerg was established when Peder Estrup divided his recently acquired estate Kirstineberg in two. Both estates were passed on to his brother Jacob Brønnum Scavenius Estrup after Peder Estrup's death in 1848. J. B. S. Estrup, who would later serve as Prime Minister of Denmark, sold the estates to Therman Ø. Hillerup after a few years. Kirstineberg was renamed Gammel Kirstineberg ("Old Kirstinebjerg") after the western part of its land was transferred to a new farm called Ny Kirstineberg ("New Kirstineberg").

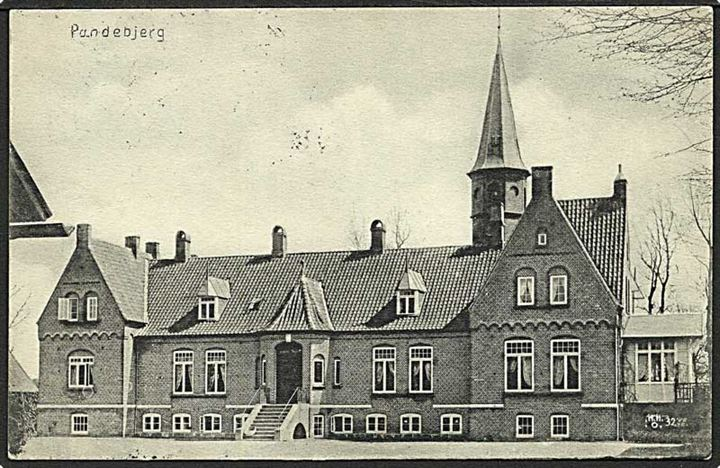
Pandebjerg in 1911

Pandebjerg was after Therman Ø. Hillerup's death in 1854 sold to H. Wilhjelm while Gammel Kirstineberg remained in the Hillerup family.

=== Tesdorpf family ===
Edward Tesdorpf, on e of the largest landowners in the area, acquired the estate in 1878. Originally from Hamburg, he had come to Denmark in 1940 where he initially acquired Orupgaard and later expanded his holdings through the purchase of several other estates. His son, Adolph Tesdorpf, who inherited Pandebjerg in 1889, acquired Ny Kirstineberg in 1908. Both estates have remained in the hands of the Tesdorpf family since then.

== Architecture ==
The current main building is from 1900 and was built to design by the architect Henrik Christopher Glahn.

== Architecture ==
The main building is designed with inspiration from early Renaissance architecture.

== Today ==
The Pandebjerg estate (with the farms Axelborg and Nygård) has a total area of 816 hectares. Farmland covers 625 hectares that are managed in collaboration with Ny Kirstineberg, Gammel Kirstineberg and Klodskovgaard. The estate is also involved in fruit production through the company Guldborgsund Grugt. Ny Kirstineberg Skov, a woodland area, is 175 hectares. The estate is also used for hunting and other events.

== List of owners ==
- (1847-1848) Peder Estrup
- (1848-1851) Jacob Brønnum Scavenius Estrup
- (1851-1854) Therman F. Ø. Hillerup
- (1854-1872) H. Wilhjelm
- (1872-1878) Forp. Petersen
- (1878-1889) Edward Tesdorpf
- (1889-1929) Adolph Valdemar Tesdorpf
- (1929-1940) Agnes Carlsdatter Brun née Tesdorpf
- (1940-1964) Axel Valdemar Tesdorpf
- (1964-2002) Anne Dorothea Axelsdatter Tesdorpf gift Castenschiold
- (2002-2007) Anne Dorothea Axelsdatter Tesdorpf gift Castenschiold / Axel
- Christian Tesdorpf Castenschiold
- (2007-) Axel Christian Tesdorpf Castenschiold
