= Frederik Tesdorpf =

Danish landowner and politician

Edward Frederik Jakob Tesdorpf
- Born: December 3, 1854; Orupgaard, Denmark
- Died: May 23, 1937 (aged 82)
- Occupation: Politician
- Years active: 1889 – 1937

Edward Frederik (Friederich) Jakob Tesdorpf (3 December 1854 – 23 May 1937) was a Danish landowner and politician. He was the owner of Orupgaard from 1889 to 1937 and a member of the Landstinget from 1902 to 1910.

== Early life ==
Frederik Tesdorpf was born on 3 December 1854 at Orupgaard, the son of Edward Tesdorpf and Mary Busch.

== Landowner ==
In 1880, he took over the management of Sæddingegård. He succeeded his father as the owner of Orupgaard as well as Brændte Ege, Kringelborg and Bøtøgård. He was in particular interested in horse breeding and was a member of the state stallion commission (statshingsteskuekommissionen). He was chairman of Nykøbing Sugar Factory in Nykøbing Falster and a member of the board of Maribo County's Economic Society.

== Politics ==
In the 1890s, Tesdorpf argued in favour of the introduction of Trade barriers to protect the Danish agricultural sector. In 1897, he was appointed as chairman of Toldbeskyttelsesforeningen. In 1902, he was elected for Landstinget as a representative for Højre and joined the Free Conservative. He had only minimal political influence and left Landstinget again in 1910.

== Personal life ==
On 15 November 1884, Tesdorpf married Sophie Tutein. She was a daughter of merchant William Tutein, Their daughter and only child, Fritze Pepina Tesdorph (1885–1967), married Erik Otto Sigismund, Count Ahlefeldt-Laurvig (1880–1967).

== Honours ==
Tesdorpf was appointed as Kammerjunker in 1879, Hofjægermester in 1890 and Kammerherre in 1909. He was created a Knight in the Order of the Dannebrog in and a Commander of the 2nd Class in 1934. He was awarded the Cross of Honour in 1923.
