= Karleby Rectory =

Listed building in Denmark

- Karleby Præstegård
- Interactive map of the Karleby Rectory area

General information
- Location: Tunderup Strandvej 1, 4800 Nykøbing F, Denmark
- Coordinates: 54°47′26.7″N 12°1′51.42″E
- Completed: 1766

Karleby Rectory (Danish: Karleby Præstegård) is a three-winged clergy house situated just southeast of Karleby Church in the village of Karleby on the Danish island of Falster. The half-timbered, thatched main wing dates from 1770 and the two are around 1740. Access to the central courtyard is through a gateway in the western barn wing. A garden with many old trees and rare plant varieties is located to the south and east of the building complex. The building complex was listed in the Danish registry of protected buildings and places in 1950.

== History ==
The rectory was originally a four-winged complex surrounding a central courtyard. The three farm wings (avlsgården) was constructed in around 1740 for pastor Oluf Larsen Biering. He was succeeded by provost Peder Pedersen Hiort (1703–1753). Hiort had an unusual background, having started his career as a dancing instructor. He was married to the former actress Maren Magdalene Lerche.

Jakob Borch (1722–1801) served as pastor of Karleby-Horreby-Nørre Ørslev from 1763 until his death in 1801. He had just returned from Greenland where he had served as missionary at Holsteinsborg. In 1766–70, he replaced the old main wing with a new one. It was constructed with the use of building materials from Nykøbing Slot. In 1814–16, it was expanded with a short side wing (kapellanfløjen) by provost Hans Resen Steenstrup.

The southern farm wing was demolished in 1923. The three surviving wings were listed on the Danish registry of protected buildings and places in 1950. The interior had shortly prior to the heritage listing been subject to substantial alterations. The residential wing was refurbished in 2005–2007.

== Architecture ==
The main wing is located on the east side of the courtyard and is 24 bays long. It is constructed with timber framing but the infills and timber structure are both white-washed. The thatches roof features two dormer windows above the two doors. The roof ridge is pierced by three white-plastered chimneys. The short side wing is constructed in brick.

The stable wing (north wing) and the barn wing (west wing) are also constructed with timber framing. They are partly white-washed like the main wing and partly finished with red-painted timber and yellow infills./

== Garden ==
The garden features a Platanum tree dating from the same year that the main wing was constructed (1770).
