= Moseby Rectory =

Listed building in Denmark

- Moseby Præstegård
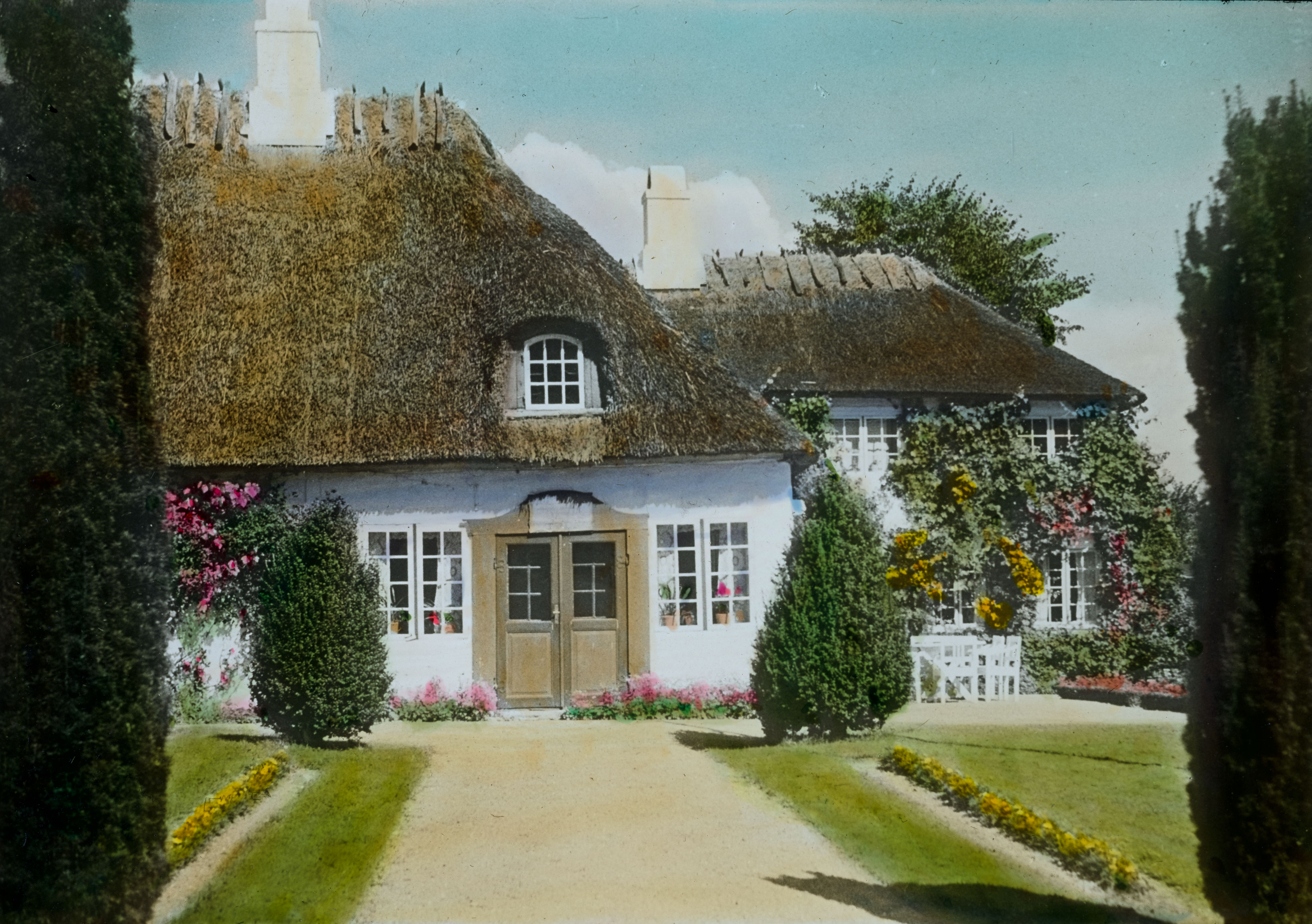
- Interactive map of the Moseby Rectory area

General information
- Location: Hesnæsvej 56, 4871 Horbelev, Denmark
- Coordinates: 54°50′22.81″N 12°6′18.29″E
- Completed: 1596
- Renovated: 1770s and later

Moseby Rectory (Danish: Moseby Præstegård), situated at Moseby, approximately 2 km southeast of Aastrup Church, is the rectory of Åstrup Parish on Falster, Guldborgsund Municipality, Denmark. The half-timbered and thatched rectory traces its history back to the 1590s but owes its current appearance to a renovation in 1770 as well as later additions.The four-winged complex was listed in the Danish registry of protected buildings and places in 1945. In 2016, Moseby Rectory was voted the most attractive rectory in Denmark in a vote arranged by Bygningskultur Danmark (now Historiske Huse). The rectory is also notable for its large landscape garden with many exotic trees as well as a pond, an orchard and a boxwood-hedged rose garden.

== History ==
=== Origins ===
Unlike what is the case in most rural parishes in Denmark, the rectory of Aastrup Parish is not located in the immediate vicinity of the local parish church. The rectory was formerly located across the street from the village pond on the western outskirts of Moseby. It was most likely moved to its current location southeast of the village by Theofilus Sadolin in 1596. This assumption is based on the fact that a piece of timber that has now been moved to the gateway features the inscription "1596" as well as a Bible quote in Latin. It is believed that it was originally located above the main entrance to the residential main wing (east wing).

=== 18th century ===
In 1760, Christian Henrik Biering was appointed as pastor of Aastrup Parish. In 1767, when Galster Cavalry Fistrict was sold at auction, Biering managed to buy Aastrup Church. In around 1770, he embarked on a comprehensive renovation of the dilapidated rectory.

A garden was laid out by Biering in 1775 with gazebos, labyrinths, ponds, streams, white-painted bridges and plantings that emphasized the topography of the terrain as a typical landscape garden. Pastor H.C. Elers Koch who resided at Horbelev Rectory just a few kilometres awau was just as interested in botany and horticulture as his colleague- The two priests competed to have the most beautiful and exotic garden.

=== 19th century ===
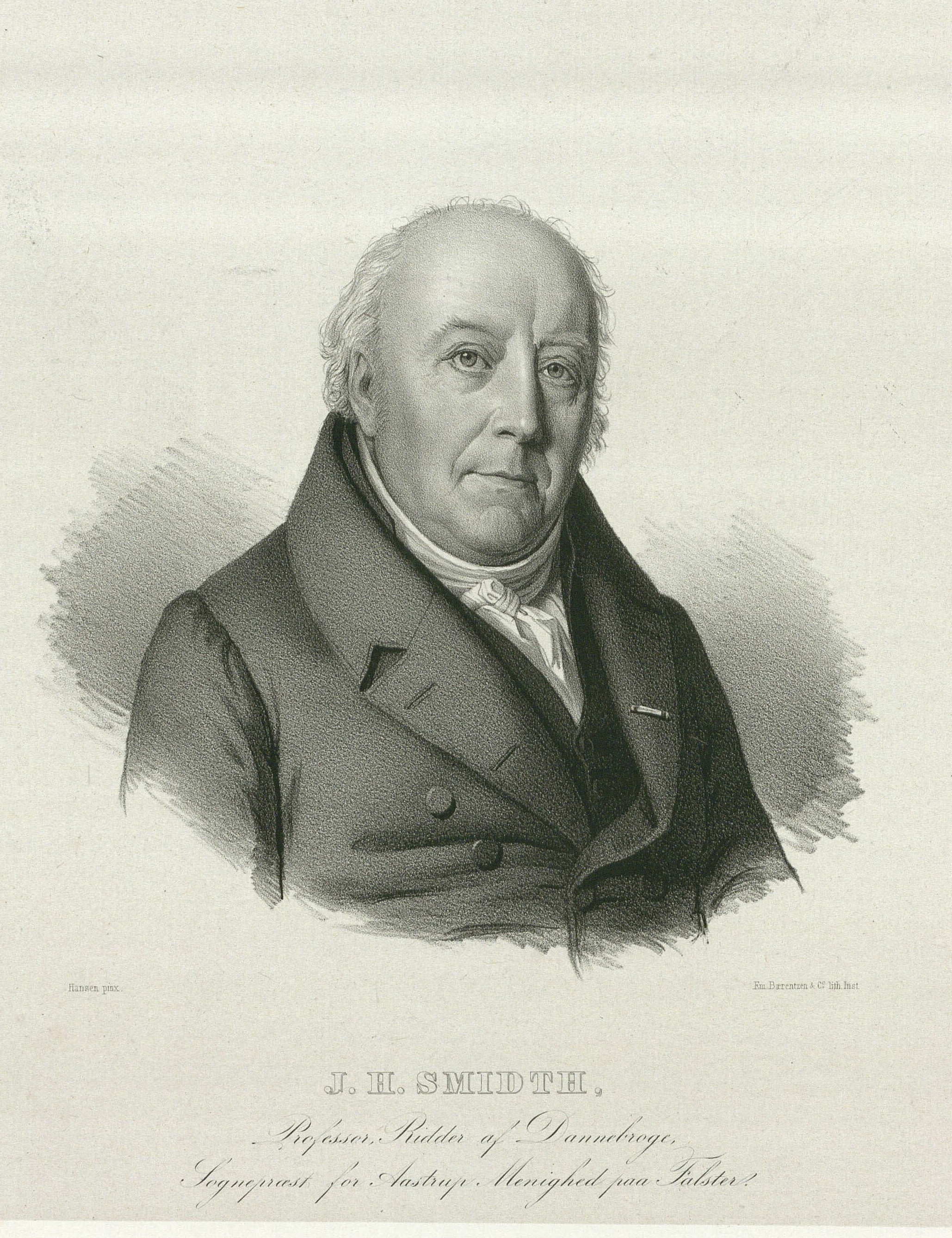
Jens Hansen Smidth.jpg

Christian Henrik Biering was succeeded by Jens Hansen Smidth. Smidt was interested in a wide range of subjects, including literature, botany and folklore. Det Classenske Fideicommis charged him with creating a plan for the school system on Falster. His home was a meetingplace for the cultural elite on the island as well as visitors from other parts of the country. His guests included Thomasine Gyllembourg and J. L. and Johanne Luise Heiberg.

Smidt was also interested in botany and horticulture. In 1810, he doubled the size of Biering's landscape garden, and planted rare trees such as blood beech, lobed beech and silver maple.

Jens Hansen Smidth was succeeded by Antonio Heineth. He served as pastor of Aastrup from 1847 to 1872) He expanded the residence in the east wing with three bays of the south wing. In 1851, he included an additional two bays of the south wing in the residence.

Heineth was succeeded by Nicolai Blicher Glahn (1712–1812). He was also interested in botany and gardening.

=== 20th century ===
In Degenkolw was appointed as pastor of Aastrup. The building was subsequently refurbished. Electgricity was installed in 1912. The four-winged complex was listed on the Danish registry of protected buildings and places in 1945. A central heating system was installed in the 1950s.

In 2016, Moseby Rectory was voted Denmark's most attractive rectory. The vote was arranged by Bygningskultur Danmark.
