= Marie Grubbe =

Danish noblewoman

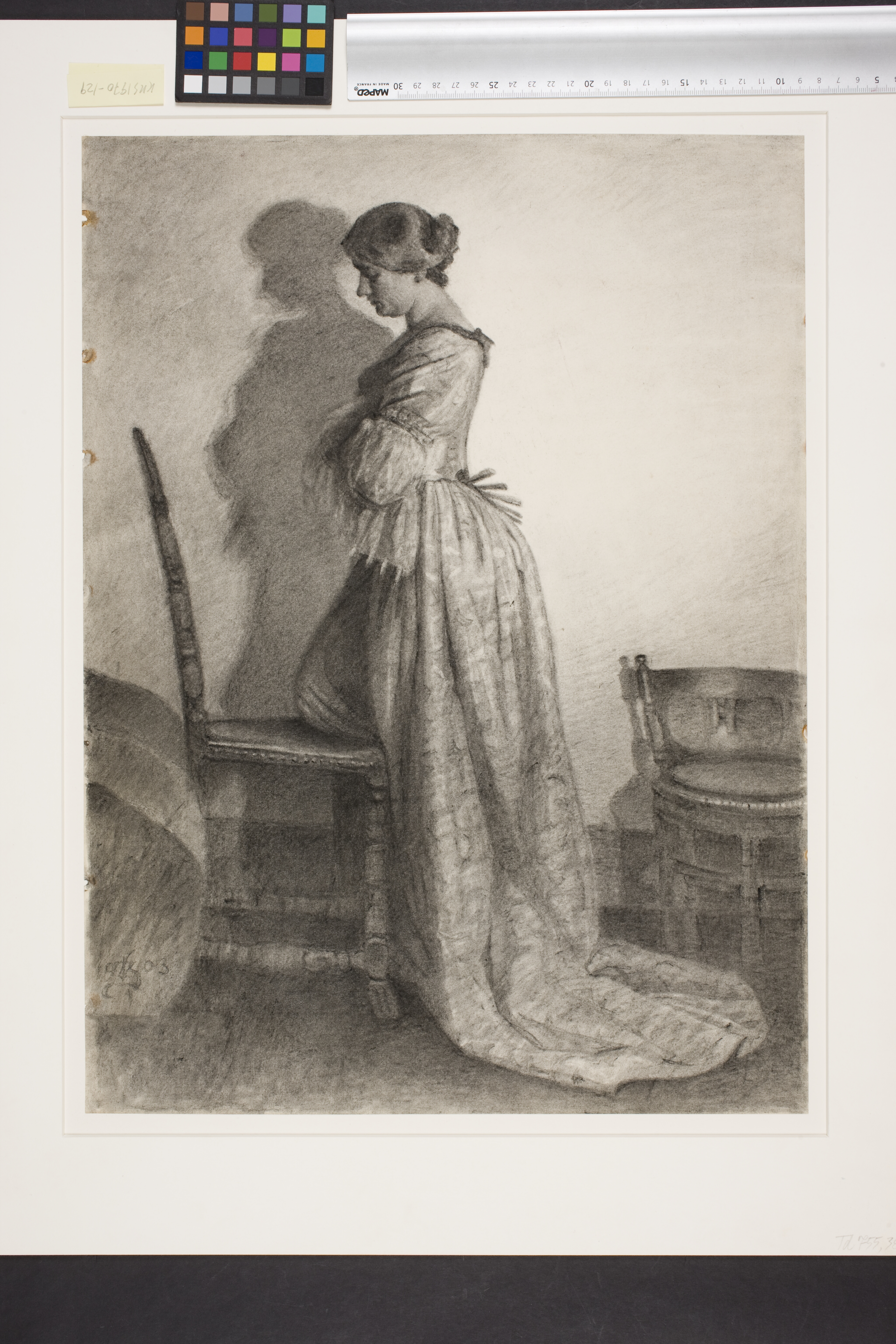
Marie Grubbe, shortly after the divorce from Ulrik Frederik Gyldenløve. Full figure standing in profile to left

Fru Marie Grubbe (1643–1718) was a member of the Danish nobility who drew a lot of attention by her many extramarital affairs. She has been the inspiration for books, plays and operas.

== Biography ==
Daughter of the statesman and nobleman Erik Grubbe (1605–92) and his wife Maren Juul (1608–47). She was married to Ulrik Frederik Gyldenløve, Count of Laurvig (1638–1704), Governor-general of Norway, the son of King Frederick III of Denmark, in 1660–70, the noble Palle Dyre (d. 1707) in 1673–91, and to the coachman Søren Sørensen Møller in 1691.

As the heir of her father, she was arranged to marry Ulrik Frederik Gyldenløve, Count of Laurvig (1638-1704), the illegitimate son of King Frederick III of Denmark by her relative Regitze, widow of the illegitimate son of King Christian IV of Denmark and Karen Andersdatter.

The Countess of Laurvig followed her husband to Oslo in 1664. She had extramarital relationships with her husband's secretary Joachim Lambert, the Frenchman Blanquefort and her brother-in-law Stygge Høeg. In 1667, the spouses separated. As adultery under Danish law was punishable by death, she thanked her spouse for her life, as he had chosen not to have her killed. She and the Count were divorced by permission of the King in 1670, and the former Countess was allowed to remarry and keep her fortune. In 1673, her father arranged a new marriage with Palle Dyre. In 1690, when she had an extramarital relationship with the younger coachman Søren Sørensen Møller, her father asked the king for permission to disinherit his daughter and to have her locked up for the rest of her life. The king asked her spouse for his wishes, and he answered that he only wished for a divorce. She was put under house arrest until the divorce was completed, after which she was disinherited and lost her right to remarry in Denmark. She then married her lover Søren Sørensen Møller in Holsten in Germany instead. The couple lived in poverty until they were given a lease on Grønsund Ferry House on Falster by the Queen dowager Charlotte Amalie of Hesse-Kassel, which enabled them to make a living from operating the ferry service to Møn and the associated inn. After the death of the queen dowager in 1714, she lived on charity. She once said to Ludvig Holberg, that she was happier with her third spouse than she had been with any other.

Some years ago, she was found to have been buried in Allerslev, under the name of Marie Grubbens.

== In culture ==
Marie Grubbe has inspired many artists since Ludvig Holberg. She has inspired the books Brudstykker af en Landsbydegns Dagbog by Steen Steensen Blicher (1824), Fru Marie Grubbe by J. P. Jacobsen, (1876) and Hønse-Grethes Familie by H. C. Andersen (1869), Kysse-Marie by Juliane Preisler (1994), ' the opera Marie Grubbe by Ebbe Hamerik (1940) and a play by Sven Lange. In 1989/1990, a three-episode TV mini-series with the title Marie Grubbe has been produced in GDR-Polish-Hungarian-Danish co-production, directed by Christian Steinke, starring Austrian actress Mijou Kovacs as Marie Grubbe.

== See also ==
- Christiana Oxenstierna
- Ingeborg Akeleye
