= Kringelborg =

Farmhouse in Denmark

- Zinns Gård
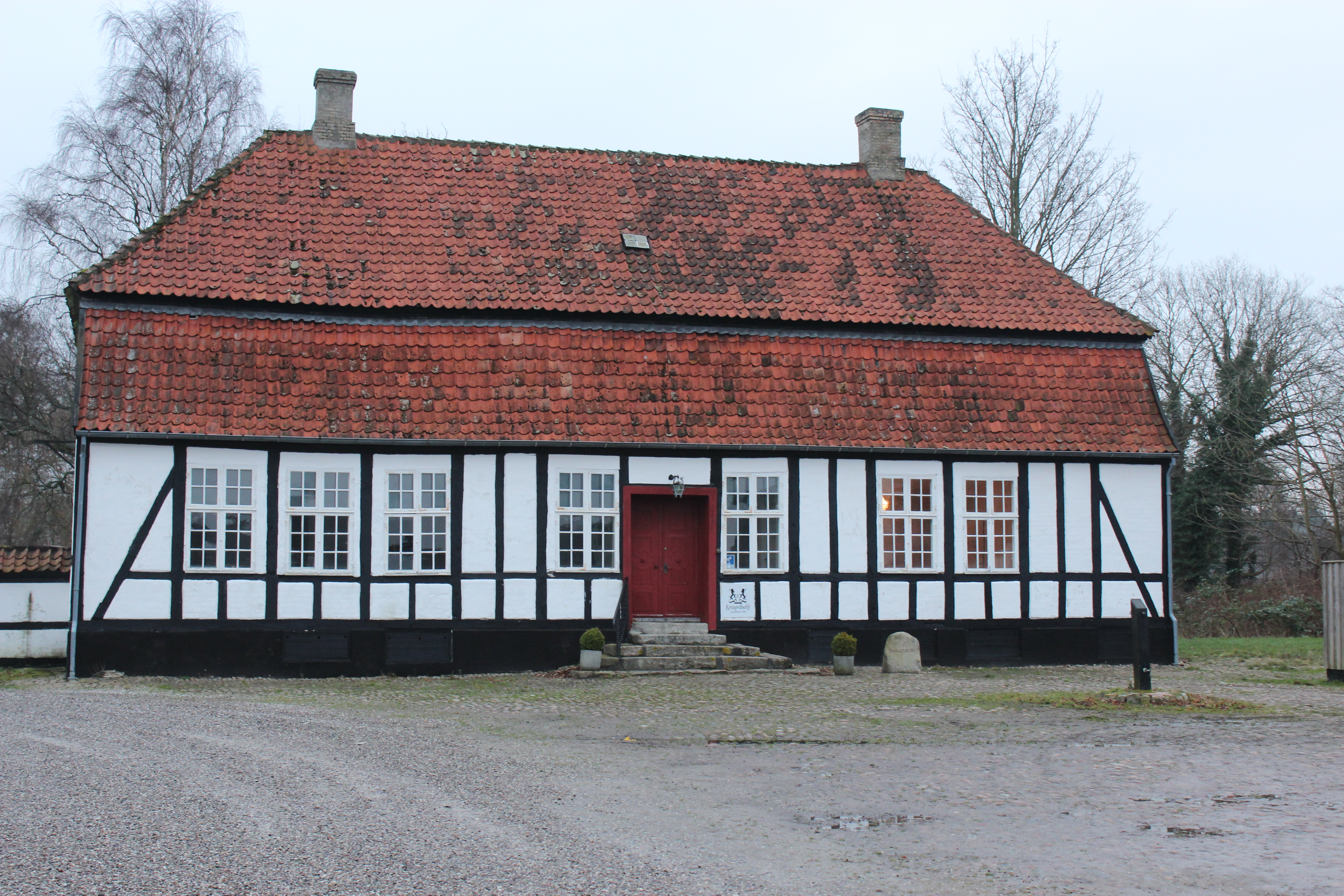
- Interactive map of the Kringelborg area

General information
- Location: Nykøbing Falster, Denmark
- Coordinates: 54°45′30.2″N 11°54′10.66″E
- Completed: 1790

Kringelborg is a late 18th-century farmhouse situated on the northern outskirts of Nykøbing on Falster is southeastern Denmark. It was listed in the Danish registry of protected buildings and places 1959.

== History ==
Kringelborg was originally called Klingborg (1483). The name Kringelborg was already used three years later (”Kringelborg huz”) in conjunction with the establishment of a House of the Holy Ghost in Nykøbing. The latter was later referred to as Nykøbing Hospital and Nykøbing Priory. In 1485, King John ordered that Idestrup Church (and parish), including Kringelborg, should contribute with funding and produce to the hospital. From 1569, Kringelborg was operated as a home farm (ladegård) under Nykøbing Hospital.

In 1766, Kringelborg was acquired by Christian Hincheldey and placed under Orupgård. The present main building was constructed in 1790.

In 1959, Kringelborg was sold to Nykøbing Municipality. The land was subsequently sold off in lots for redevelopment with single-family detached housing. In 1987, Kringelborg came into use as a new headquarters for the local chapter of Hjemmeværnet.<ref"/>

== Architecture ==
Kringelborg is a 14-bay-long, half-timbered building, constructed on a blackpainted plinth with black-painted timber framing and white-plastered infills. The red-painted Empire-style door is placed in a relatively deep niche in the central bay. The Mansard roof is clad in red tiles.
