= Gammel Kirstineberg =

Manor house in southeastern Denmark

- Interactive map of the Gammel Kirstineberg area

General information
- Architectural style: Neoclassical
- Location: Falster, Denmark
- Coordinates: 54°47′43.74″N 11°52′9.13″E
- Completed: 1773
- Client: H. Tersling

Gammel Kirstineberg is a manor house located on the island of Falster in southeastern Denmark. The main building is from 1773 and was listed on the Danish registry of protected buildings and places by the Danish Heritage Agency on 5 March 1945.

== History ==
Gammel Kirstineberg traces its history back to the late 18th century when Christian VII sold the royal holdings on Falster in auction to make payments on the Danish sovereign debt. The land was divided into eight parcels, each of which forming the basis of a new manor house with associated tenant farms. Parcel number seven was acquired by H. Tersling and P. Thestrup who constructed a house on the land and named the estate Vennerslund ("Friends' Grove").

A second manor house was built on the land in 1773 after the tenant farmers had complained about the long distances they had to cover to work in the fields. The new manor house was given the name Kirstineberg ("Kirstine's Hill") after Tersling's wife Kirstine. Tersling died in 1785 and his widow Kirstine Tersling became the sole owner of Vennerslund and Kirstineberg four years later. When she then married Jakob Edvard Colbjørnsen, it was decided in a prenuptial that Vennerslund was to be passed on to her son from her first marriage, Jørgen Tersling, while Kirstineberg would be passed on to the Colbjørnsen family. H. Chr. Colbjørnsen took over the estate in 1806. He amalgamated all the land of all the farms in the village of Kraghave directly under the manor house.

In 1845, H. Chr. Colbjørnsen sold Kirstineberg to Peder Estrup. He divided the estate in two, constructing the new manor house Pandebjerg on some of the land. Both estates were passed on to his brother Jacob Brønnum Scavenius Estrup after Peder Estrup's death in 1848. J. B. S. Estrup, who would later serve as Prime Minister of Denmark, sold the estates to Therman Ø. Hillerup after a few years. Kirstineberg was renamed Gammel Kirstineberg ("Old Kirstinebjerg") after the western part of its land was transferred to a new farm called Ny Kirstineberg ("New Kirstineberg").

Gammel Kirstineberg and Ny Kirstineberg were sold to different buyers after Therman Ø. Hillerup's death in 1864. Gammel Kirstineberg was acquired by Victor Hillerup and the estate was later passed on to his son Aksel Hillerup. He managed the estate with great skill until his death in 1935. The estate remained in the hands of the Hillerup family until 2002.

== Architecture ==
The main wing was built in 1773 with building materials from Nykøbing Castle. It is a one-storey building, partly built in brick and partly with timber framing (oak) and with a half hipped tile roof.

The main wing is located on the northside of a large courtyard which is flanked by farm buildings on the east and west sides. The courtyard was originally closed to the south by a fourth wing which has been demolished. The half-timbered east wing is a barn which was used for the storage of tithe. The west wing was rebuilt after a fire in 1880.

== List of owners ==
- (1773-1785) H. Tersling
- (1773-1789) P. Thestrup
- (1785-1806) Kirstine Hofgaard, gift 1) Tersling, 2) Colbjørnsen
- (1806-1845) H. Chr. Colbjørnsen
- (1845-1848) Peder Estrup
- (1848-1851) Jacob Brønnum Scavenius Estrup
- (1851-1863) Therman Ø. Hillerup
- (1863-1894) Victor Hillerup
- (1894-1935) Aksel Hillerup
- (1935-1953) Ellen Hillerup
- (1953-1970) Jørgen Hillerup
- (1970-2002) Anders Jørgen Hillerup
- (2002–present) Linnéa Treschow/Lars Hvidtfeldt
