= Gåbense Færgegård =

Historic building in Denmark

Coordinates: 54°56′38″N 11°52′36″E

Gåbense Færgegård (Gåbense Ferry Inn) is a historic building in the village of Gåbense on the north coast of Falster in southeastern Denmark.

== History ==
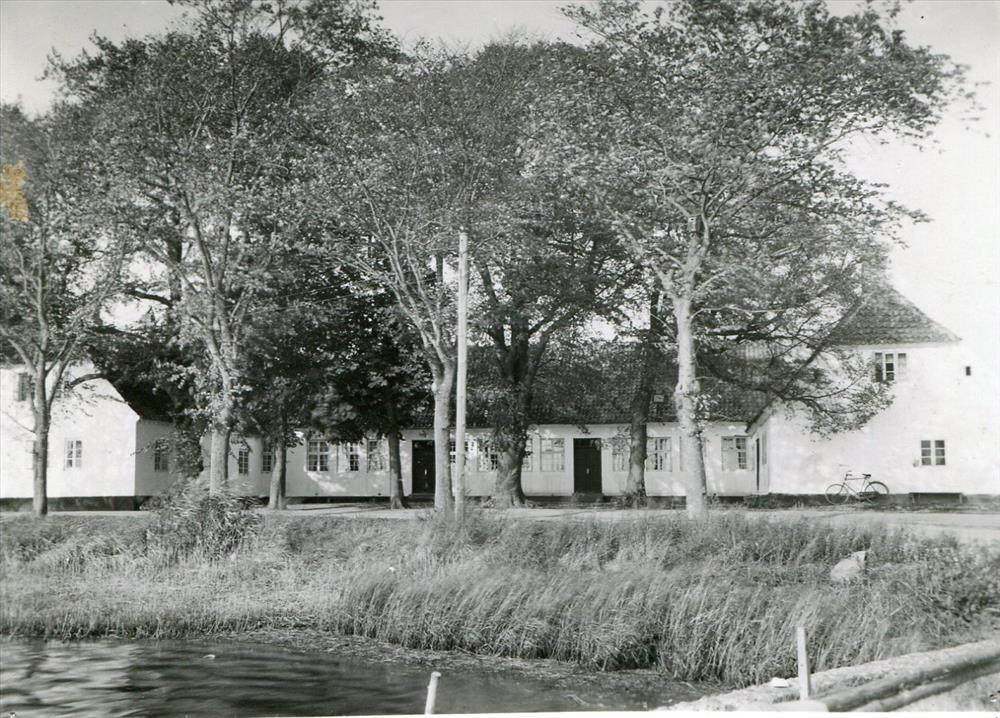
Gåbense Færgegård in 1935

Gåbense's role as a port for ferries between Falster and Zealand was based on a royal license which is first mentioned in Jens Sjællandsfars livsbrev (1523). The history of the present Gåbense Færgegård dates back to circa 1600. The building was also used as a post office.

The ferry port in Gåbense moved west to Orehoved when the railway opened in 1872. A new car ferry operated between Gåbense and Vordingborg from 1919 but ceased to operate when the Storstrøm Bridge was inaugurated in 1936. Gåbense Færgegård was listed in the Danish registry of protected buildings and places in 1950.

== Architecture ==
Gåbense Færgegård is a three-winged complex.
