= Ebba Tesdorpf =

German painter

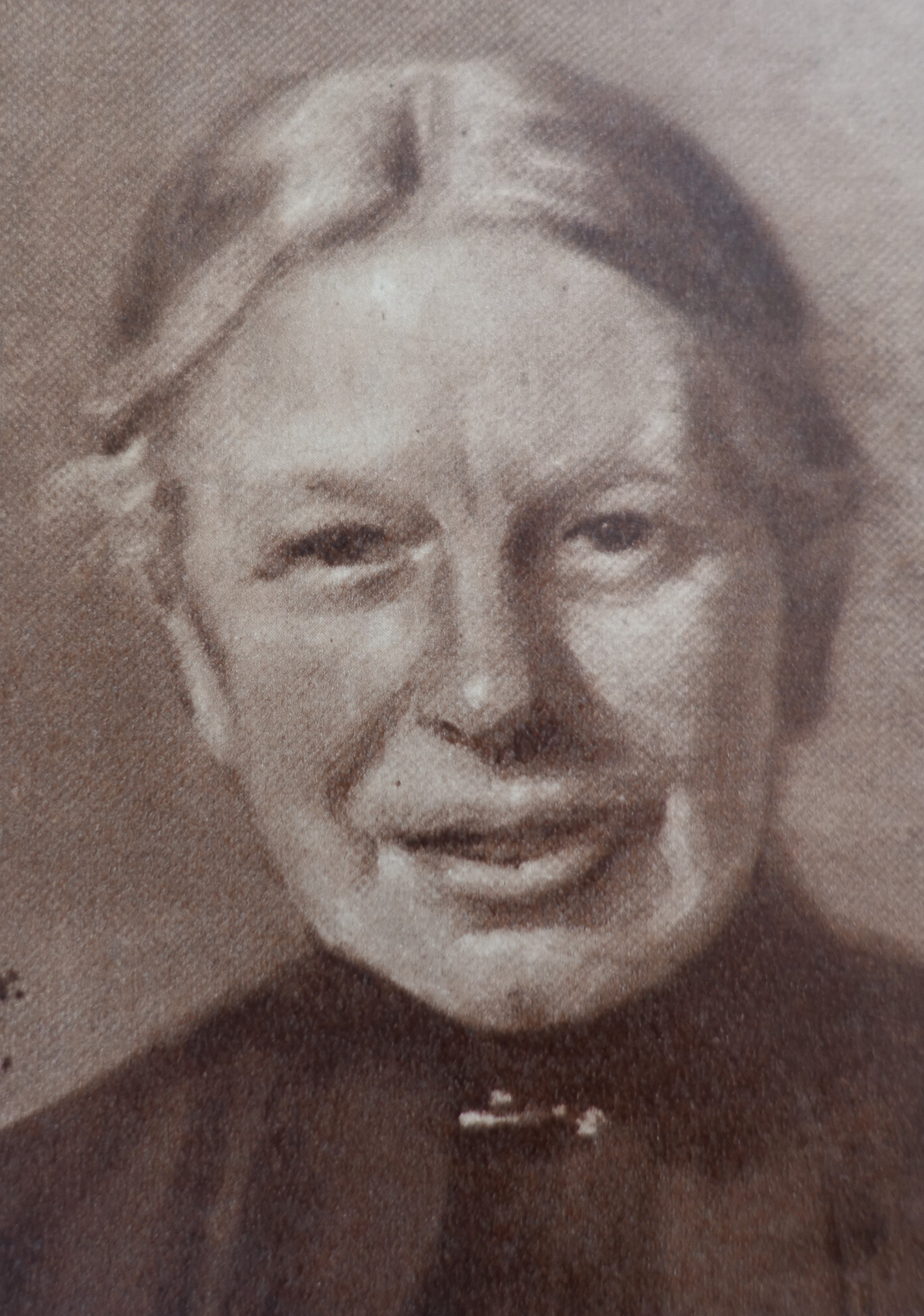
- Portrait by Julie de Boor in 1889
- Born: 23 January 1851; Hamburg, Germany
- Died: 22 February 1920 (aged 69); Ahrweiler, Germany
- Known for: Illustration, Watercolor
- Notable work: Documentation of the old Hamburg cityscape during the demolition phase in the late 19th century

Ebba Tesdorpf (23 January 1851 – 22 February 1920) was an illustrator and watercolorist from Hamburg, Germany.

== Life ==
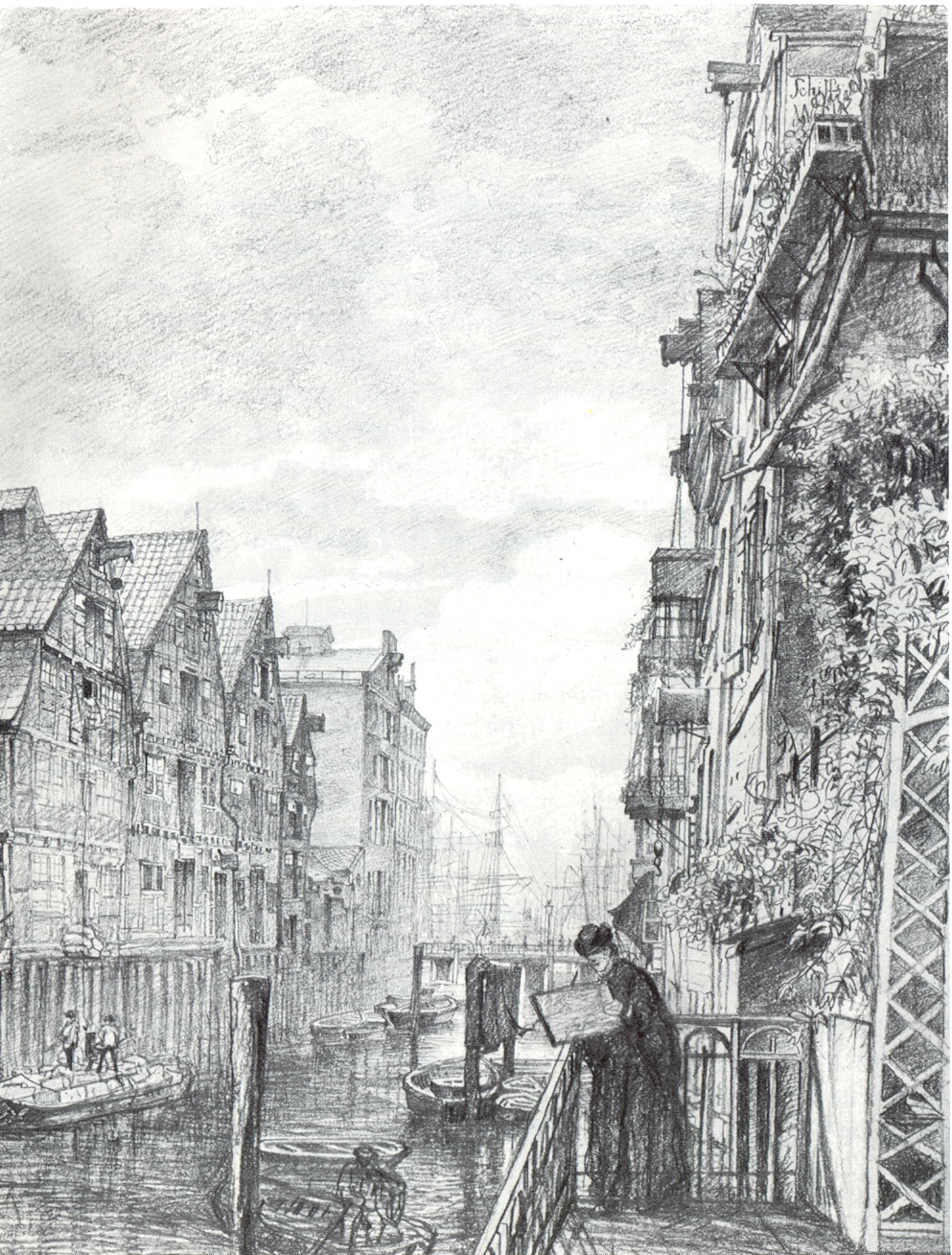
Self-portrait of Ebba Tesdorpf (c. 1885) overlooking the town canal behind Stubbenhuk, a small side street in Hamburg

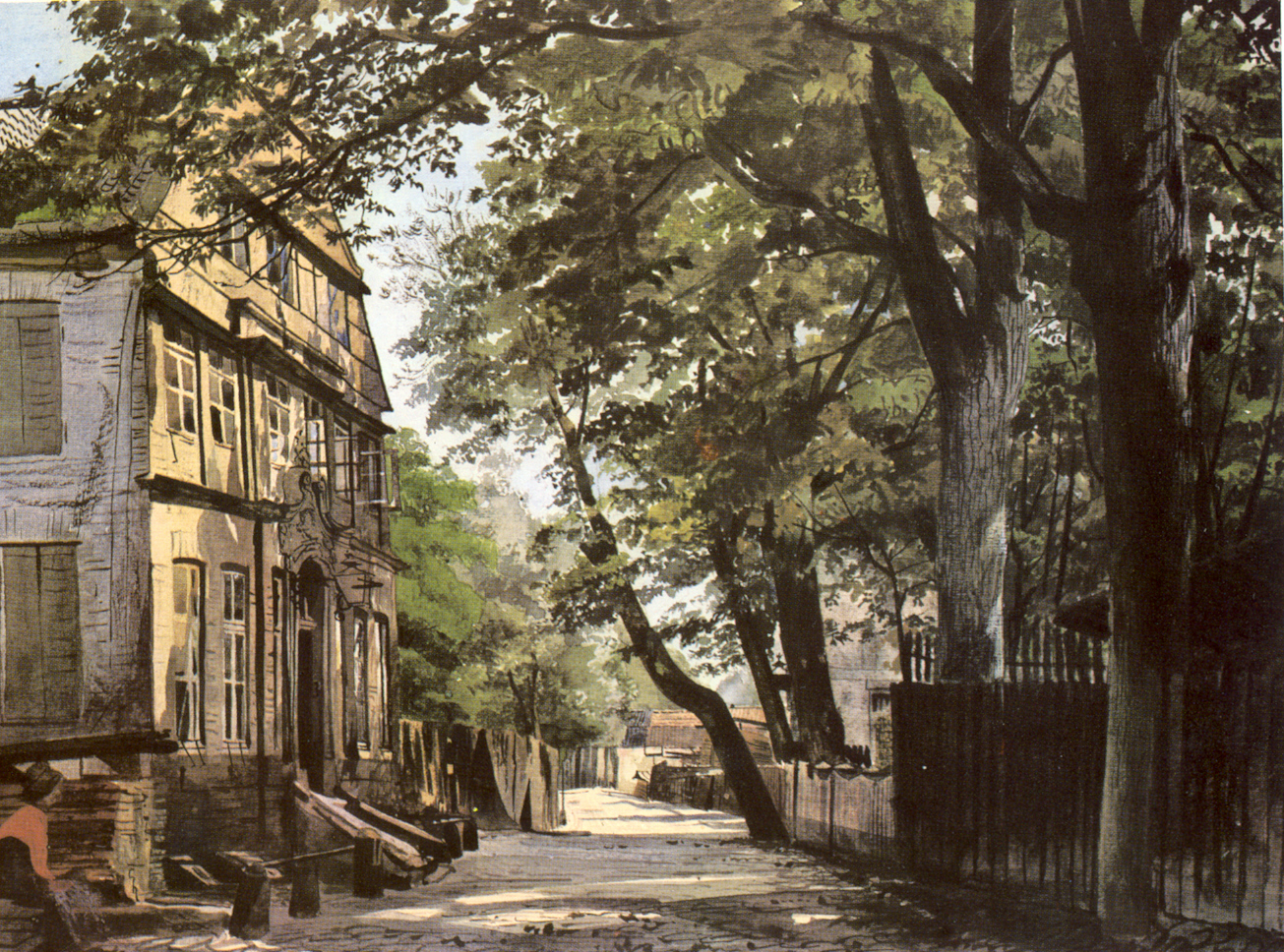
Office of JC Jauch & Sons, Stadtdeich 9 (c. 1880), one of the few watercolors by Ebba Tesdorpf

Tesdorpf came from a Hanseatic family. She was the daughter of businessman Hans Peter Friedrich Tesdorpf and Antoinette Karoline Mohrmann (formerly Abendroth). Her ancestors include her great-grandfather Peter Hinrich Tesdorpf (1751–1832) and his great-grandfather, Peter Hinrich Tesdorpf (1648–1723), both mayors of Lübeck.

She developed her talent for drawing in Hamburg. For a short time in 1898 she trained under Hermann Gross at the Academy in Düsseldorf. Her teachers were Mohrhagen Bernhard and Johann Theobald Riefesell who primarily taught drawing to women of the Hamburg high society.

At the suggestion of Justus Brinckmann and Alfred Lichtwark, Tesdorpf drew a documentation of the old Hamburg cityscape during the demolition phase in the 1880s and 1890s. Recording Hamburg became a passion for Ebba Tesdorpf. In her paintings she captured everything from the mundane scenes of Hamburg, its streets, the old parts of the town and the new, the city harbor and the canals that ran through it. With the death of her parents Tesdorpf became financially independent. Around 1894 she grew tired of life in Hamburg and moved to Düsseldorf, where she lived from then on.

Tesdorpf donated her drawings as well as her purchased collection of valuable Hamburgensien (works of art pertaining to Hamburg) to the Hamburg Museum of Arts and Crafts. These pieces were later moved to the Museum of Hamburg History and provide a unique documentary of the appearance of the city of Hamburg in the second half of the 19th century. Tesdorpf considered it her "mission" to capture the "old Hamburg" in images – often structures destined for demolition in the years of urban renewal.

Her life's work included over 600 drawings, along with a few watercolors which she painted at the turn of the century. In Düsseldorf she mainly painted oil paintings. Tesdorpf died during a stay at a spa in Ahrweiler.

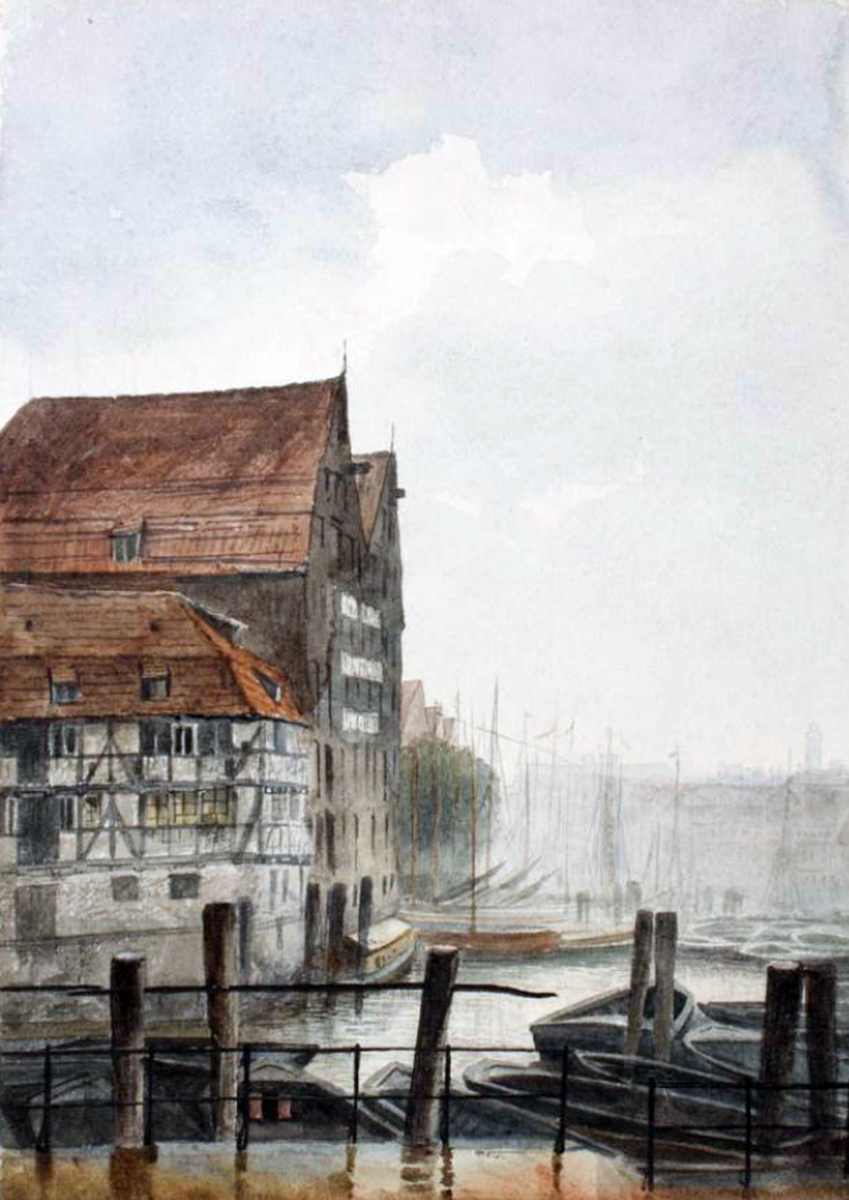
The old orphanage in Hamburg
