= Gjedsergaard =

Manor house on the island of Falster in southeastern Denmark

- Interactive map of the Gjedsergaard area

General information
- Location: Falster, Denmark
- Coordinates: 54°38′56.83″N 11°52′55.62″E
- Completed: 1767
- Renovated: 1872, 1944
- Client: Gustav Frederik greve Holck-Winterfeldt

Gjedsergård is a manor house on the island of Falster in southeastern Denmark. It has been owned by members of the Tesdorpf family since 1847. The main building and the parallel building Kavalerfløjen are from 1768 and were listed on the Danish registry of protected buildings and places by the Danish Heritage Agency on 1 December 1959

== History ==
=== Early history ===
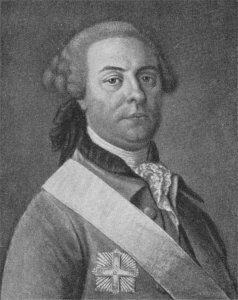
Gustav Frederik Holck-Winterfeldt: The first owner of Gjedsergaard

Gjedsergaard was created in 1766 when Christian VII sold most of the royal holdings on the island of Falster in auction to make payments on Denmark's sovereign debt. The estate was acquired by Gustav Frederik Holck-Winterfeldt. He was the son of count Christian Christopher Holck and Ermegaard Sophie von Winterfeldt and the brother of Conrad Holck, the favorite of king Christian VII of Denmark, Margrethe Holck and Flemming Holck.

He unsuccessfully tried to expand the estate through the acquisition of more land. In 1772, when Holck's elder brother Flemming died without issue, he inherited the Barony of Vintersborg on Lolland. This prompted him to sell Gedsergård in 1773. The new owner was Niels Frederiksen Amager who was the local pastor of the parish of Skelby.

=== Friis family ===
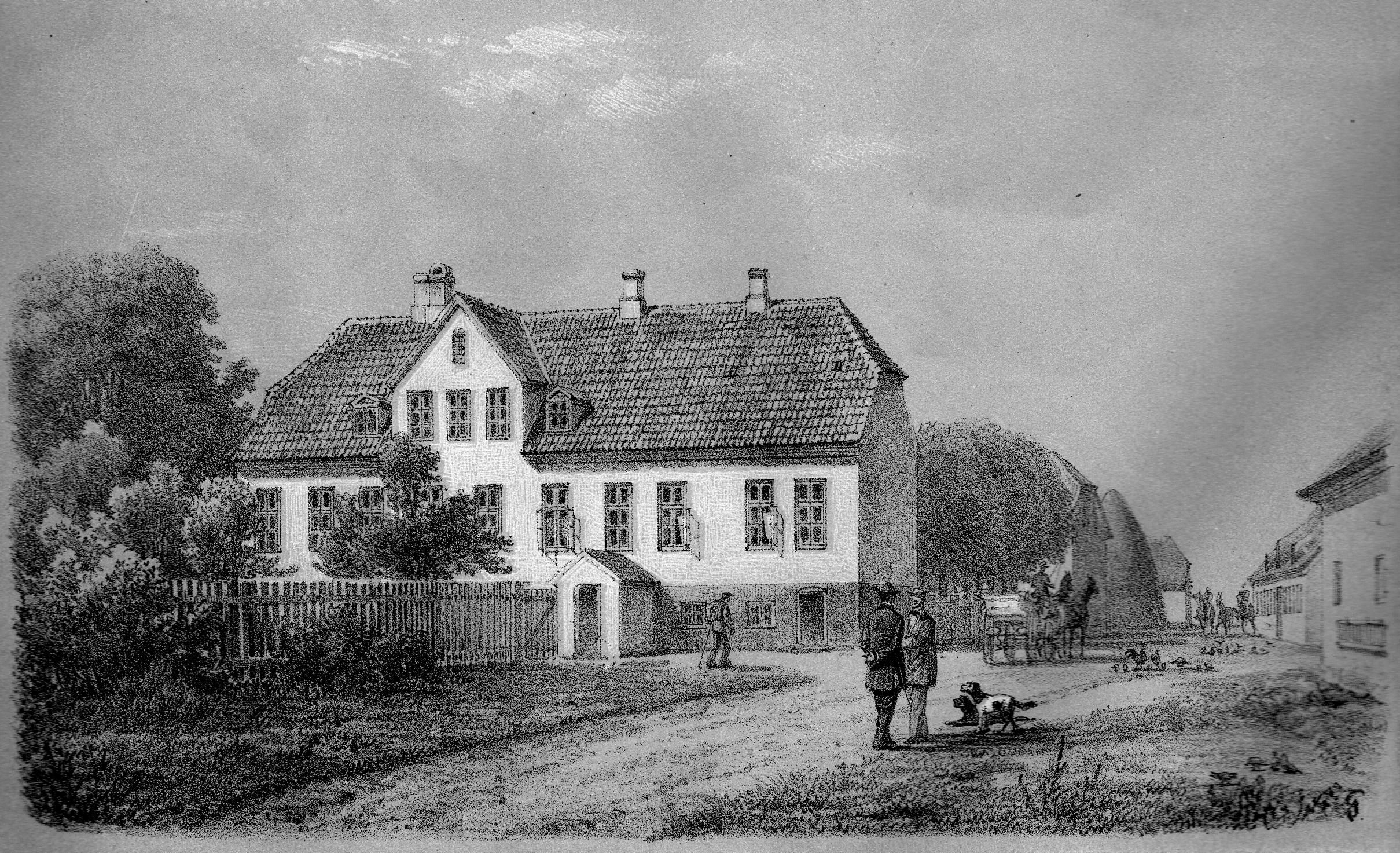
Ghedsergaard in 1867

Amager died in 1781 and his heirs sold Gedsergård to Jakob Melsing and Johan Christian Friis in 1784 while some of the tenant farms were sold to the individual tenant farmers. Friis became the sole owner of Gjedsergård after Melsing's death in 1789.

Friis constructed the property Friisenfeldt on the land and acquired the farm Nøjsomhed. The remaining tenant farms were gradually merged into larger farms. Johan Christian Friis sold Gjedsergaard and the associated farms to his son Christian Frederik Friis in 1811.

=== Tesdorpf family ===
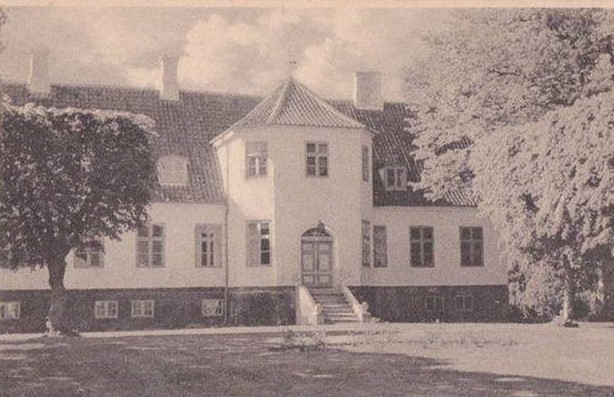
Ghedsergaard from the courtyard

Christian Frederik Friis died in 1845 and his widow sold Gedsergaard to Edward Tesdorpf from Orupgård in 1847. He improved the dairy on the estate and instigated the draining of Bøtø Nor. After Tesdorpf's death in 1889, Gedsergaard and Pandebjerg were passed on to his son Adolph Valdemar Tesdorpf. He had been the managing director of the sugar refinery in Nykøbing Falster since 1884. He inherited an estate in East Prussia and was for a while also the owner of Rudbjerggård on Lolland. He acquired Bonderup in 1900, Ny Kirstinebjerg in 1908 Gjorslev in 1925. Gjedsergaard with Friisenfeldt and Ludvigsgave was sold to his son Axel Tesdorpf by his widow following his death in 1929. His daughter Ida Merete Emmy Tesdorpf took over the estate after his death in 1964.

== Architecture ==
The main building was built by Gustav Frederik Holck-Winterfeldt in 1767. The relatively modest building consists of one storey and a cellar. A two-storey, canted projection with the main entrance was added in the late 18th century and a gabled dormer overlooking the garden has been added on the rear side of the building. These alterations accentuate the asymmetry of the building which also follows from the placement of the windows.

The main building was refurbished and partly adapted in 1872 and saw another refurbishment under supervision of the architect C. F. Dam in 1944.

A parallel building known as Kavalerfløjen is located on the other side of a courtyard. The main wing may originally have been intended as a side wing of a larger three-winged complex whose main wing was never realized. The layout with two parallel buildings is on the other hand also known from other main houses from the same period. It is therefore also possible that Holck-Winterfeldt had no intention of using the house as a residence but merely saw it as a source of income and therefore chose a modest design.

Tesdorpf constructed a new complex of farm buildings to the northwest of kavalerfløjen between 1872 and 1883.

Two buildings flank the beginning of the avenue that leads up to the main building. They were built as residences for staff in the late 19th century.

== Today ==
The current owner of Gjedsergaard is Iver Alex Tesdorpf Unsgaard. The estate covers 888 hectares, of which 404 hectares belong to Gjedsergaard. 764 hectares are covered by farmland and 124 hectares by forest.

== List of owners ==
- (1766-1773) Gustav Frederik greve Holck-Winterfeldt
- (1773-1781) Niels Frederiksen Amager
- (1781-1784) The estate of Niels Frederiksen Amagers
- (1784-1789) Jakob Melsing and Johan Christian Friis
- (1789-1811) Johan Christian Friis
- (1811-1845) Christian Frederik Friis
- (1845-1847) The widow of Christian Frederik Friis
- (1847-1889) Edward Tesdorpf
- (1889-1929) Adolph Valdemar Tesdorpf
- (1929-1940) Agnete Brun née Tesdorpf
- (1940-1964) Axel Valdemar Tesdorpf
- (1964-2006) Ida Merete Emmy Tesdorpf Unsgaard
- * (2002–present) Iver Alex Tesdorpf Unsgaard
