= Orupgaard =

Manor house on the Danish island of Falster

- Interactive map of the Orupgaard area

General information
- Location: Egeparken 3; 4800 Nykøbing F, Denmark
- Coordinates: 54°45′37″N 11°57′10″E
- Completed: 1862
- Renovated: 1940/1955

Orupgaard is a manor house located 6 kilometres (3.7 mi) east of Nykøbing and 3 kilometres (1.9 mi) north of Idestrup on the Danish island of Falster. With a history dating from the 13th century, Orupgaard today manages over 1,200 hectares (3,000 acres) of farmland and forest as well as an equestrian facility at Brændte Ege Avlsgaard.

== History ==
=== Early history ===
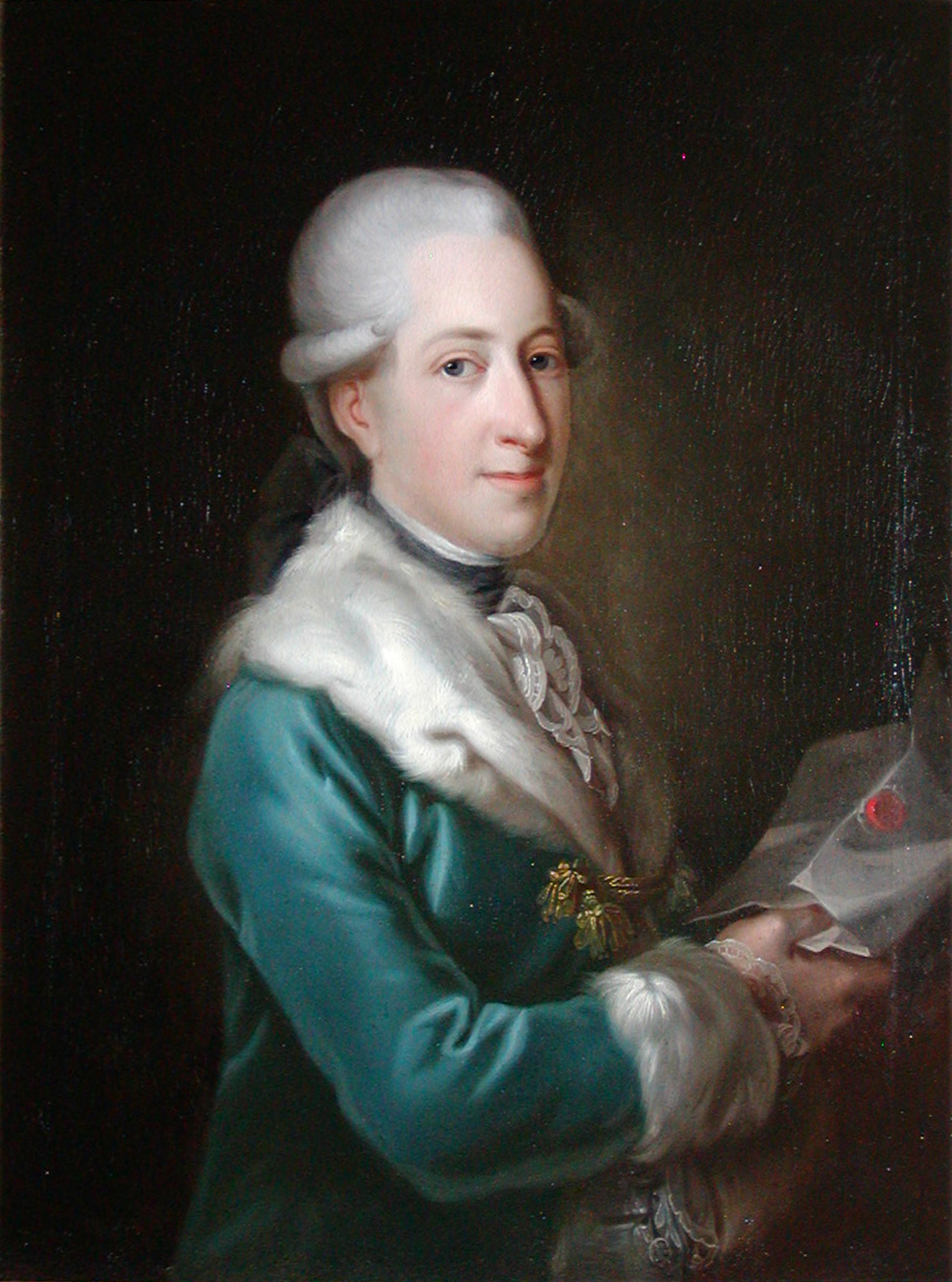
Charles August Selby

Orupgaard is first mentioned in the Danish Census Book in 1231 as Oræthrop. It consisted of a few small farms managed by Nykøbing Palace on behalf of the Crown. Around 1660, they were merged into one property.

=== Christian Hincheldey ===
After Orupgaard was completely destroyed by fire in 1718, the land was leased out to farmers until 1766 when Christian Hincheldey bought the estate. He had also bought nearby Kringelborg. He had a reputation for being a brutal landlord and was involved in many disputes with the farmers on his estates.

=== Selbye family ===
In 1809, Hincheldey's widow sold Orupgård to the English baron Charles August Selby (1755–1823) who built a fine new manor which he left to his son Charles Borre de Selby.

=== Tesdorpf family ===
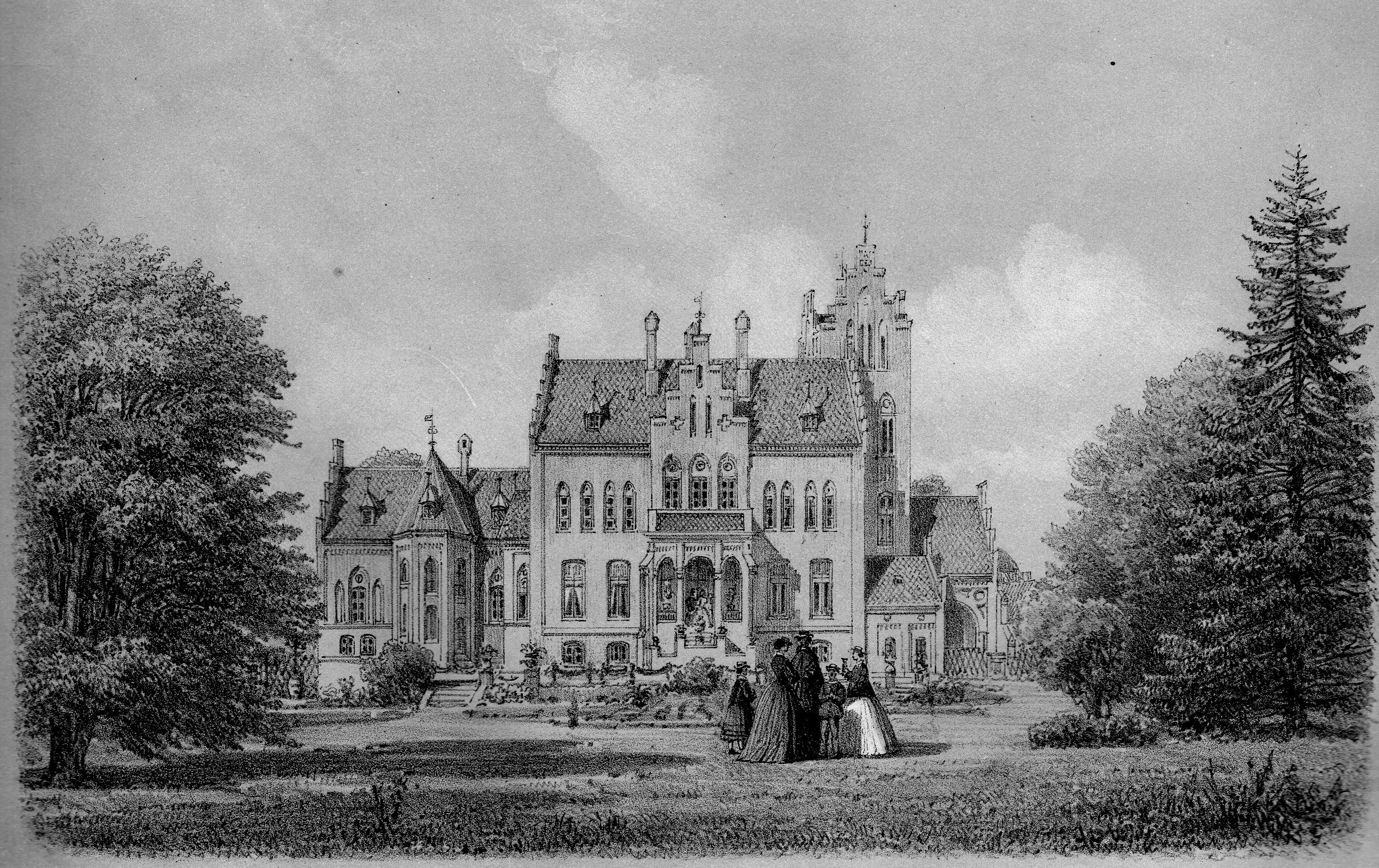
Orupgaard drawn by Ferdinand Richardt in 1867

In 1840, Edward Tesdorpf, the son of a Hamburg merchant, bought the estate, introducing a style of innovative farming which was widely recognized as a model to be emulated. He thoroughly drained and fertilized the land, brought in new breeds of cattle and built a dairy, achieving a five-fold increase in production by 1890.

Tesdpråf passed Orupgaard down to his eldest son Frederik Tesdorpf.

=== Højgaard family ===
In 1938, Frederik Tesdorpf 's widow, Spåhie Tesdorpf, née Tutein, sold the estate to Knud Højgaard (1878 –1968), a civil engineer, who completely redesigned the building in the style of an English country home. His son, Erik Højgaard who administered the estate from 1954, was among the first to fully mechanize farm production in the area. The owner today is Thomas Højgaard.

== Architecture ==
The manor house is built in "English style". It has plastered walls and a mansard roof.

== Grounds ==
A stand of chestnut trees is situated north of the manor house. A stable wing, a dairy building and a carriage house are all of yellow stone.

Brændte Ege ("the burnt oak") riding center was created in 1905 after the merger of three farms. One of these, Nøjsomhed, originally belonged under the manor of Gjedsergaard, while the other two were tenant farms under Orupgaard, named Kaaregaarden and Griggegaarden. The merged farm received its name ("burnt oak") after a nearby forest, so called because Swedes burnt it in 1658.

== Cultural references ==
Orupgaard is used as a location in the 1959 comedy Charles tante.

== List of owners ==
- (1230–1766) The Crown
- (1766–1793) Christian Hincheldey
- (1793–1809) Laurentia Hofgaard, gift Hincheldey
- (1809–1823) Charles de Selby
- (1823–1840) Charles Borre de Selby
- (1840–1889) Edward Tesdorpf
- (1889–1937) Frederik Tesdorpf
- (1937–1939) Sophie Tesdorpf, née Tutein
- (1939–1954) Knud Højgaard
- (1954–1977) Erik Højgaard
- (1977–2005) Knud Højgaard
- * (1999–present) Thomas Højgaard
