= Edward Tesdorpf =

German-Danish landowner, agricultural pioneer and sugar manufacturer

Edward Tesdorph
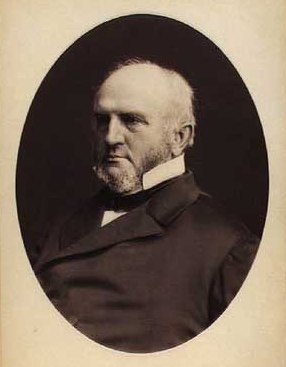
- Born: 7 September 1817; Hamburg, Holy Roman Empire
- Died: 2 May 1889 (aged 71); Orupgård, Falster, Denmark
- Occupations: Landowner, sugar manufacturer
- Awards: Commander of the Order of the Dannebrog

Edward Tesdorpf (7 September 1817 – 2 May 1889), was a German-Danish landowner, agricultural pioneer and sugar manufacturer. He became the owner of ten estates; many were located in the Lolland-Falster area where he resided at Orupgaard near Nykøbing Falster, where he founded a sugar factory in 1884. Several of the estates are still owned by his descendants, including Gjedsergaard and Pandebjerg on Falster.

== Early life ==
Tesdorpf was born into a wealthy family in Hamburg as the son of merchant Oberalter Friedrich Jacob Tesdorgph (1781–1862) og Dorothea Rücker (1789–1844).

== Career ==
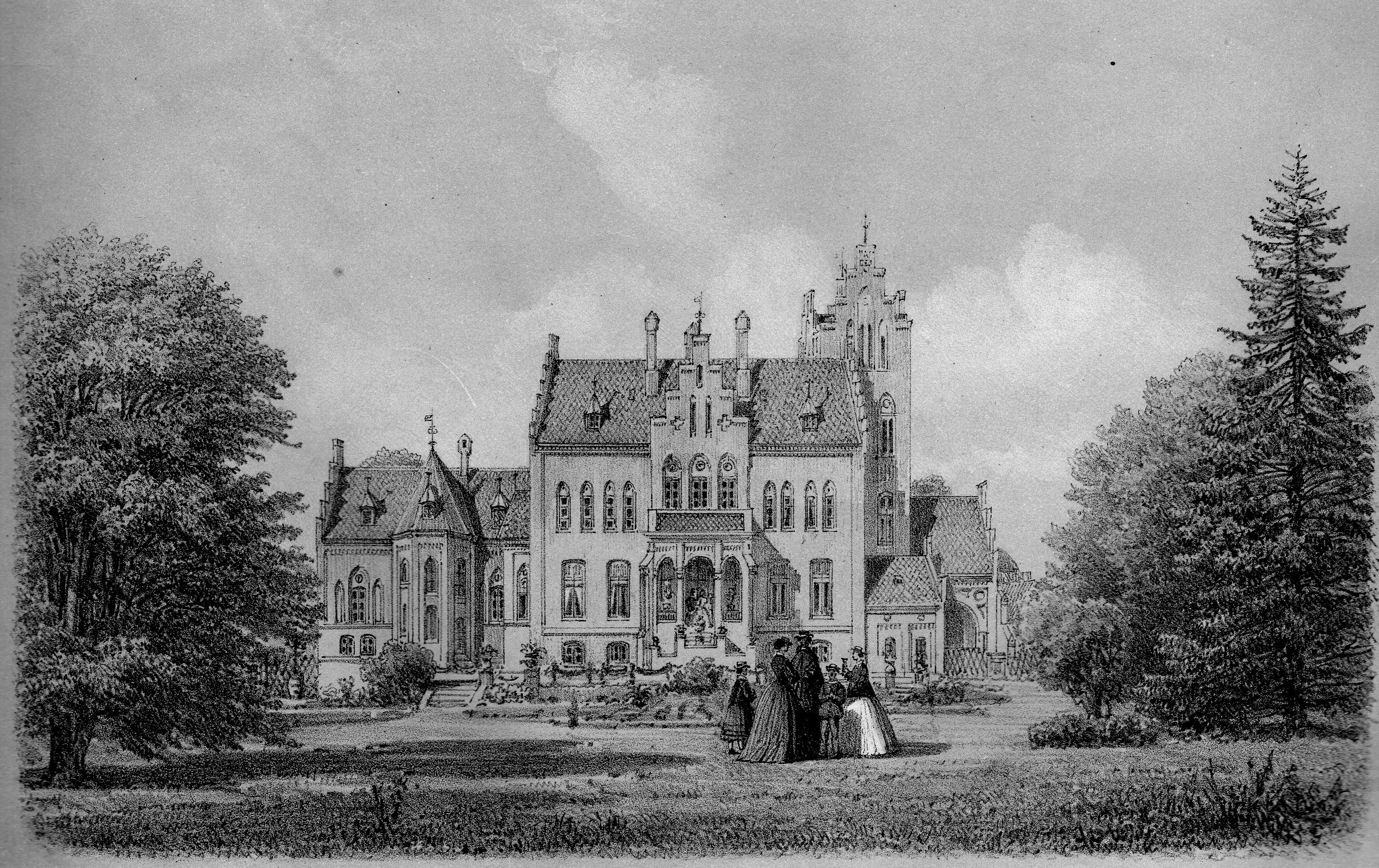
Orupgaard drawn by Ferdinand Richardt in 1867

He came to Denmark where he acquired Orupgård on the island of Lolland in 1840. He later acquired many other large properties, including Pandebjerg (1878) on Falster and Sædlingegård (1871) on Lolland, until he finally owned ten estates across Denmark with a total area of 2,400 hectares (5,900 acres). He was a dynamic and innovative farmer, introducing a style of farming which was widely recognized as a model to be emulated. He thoroughly drained and fertilized the land, pioneered the use of steam power and new machinery in Danish agriculture, brought in new breeds of cattle and built a dairy, achieving a five-fold increase in production by 1890. He established Nykøbing Falster Sugar Factory in Nykøbing Falster in 1884. He founded Nykøbing Falster Sukkerfabrik in Nykøbing Falster in 1884.

== Personal life ==
Tesdorpf died at Orupgaard in 1889. He is buried at Idstrup Cemetery on Falster.

He was married to Mary née Büsch (1820–1875). They had the sons Frederik Tesdorpf and Adolph Tesdorpf and the daughter Ida Charlotte Sophie Tesdorph.

== Titles and honours ==
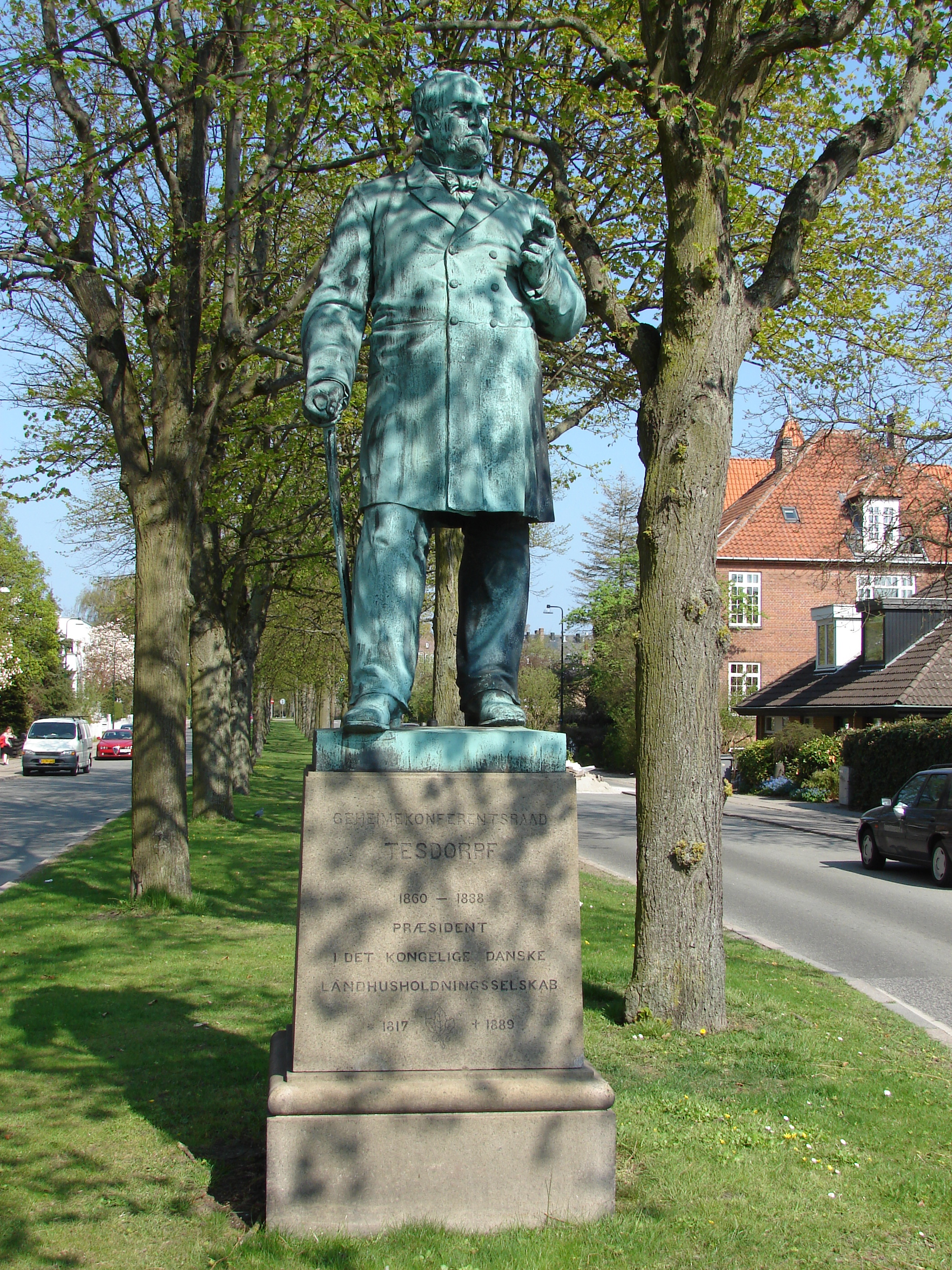
The statue of Edward Tesdorpf at Tesdorpfsvej in Frederiksberg, Copenhagen

Tesdorpf was one of the presidents of the Royal Danish Agricultural Society from 1860 to 1888. He was appointed an honorary member of the organisation when he retired from the post and was awarded its gold medal as the first recipient in 36 years. He was also an honorary member of the Royal Agricultural Society of England.

Tesdorpf was appointed an etatsråd in 1860, konferensråd in 1885 and gehejmekonferensråd in 1888. He was honored with the Commander 2nd Class in the Order of the Dannebrog in 1872 and with the Commander 1st Class in 1887.

Danish agricultural organisations commissioned a statue of him from Theobald Stein after his death. It was installed in the gardens of the Royal Danish Agricultural College in Frederiksberg in 1893. It has later been moved to Tesdorpfsvej which is named after him. Nykøbing Falster is also home to a memorial.
