= Anne Catherine of Brandenburg =

Queen of Denmark and Norway from 1597 to 1612

- Anne Catherine c. 1600

Queen consort of Denmark and Norway
- Tenure: 27 November 1597 – 8 April 1612
- Coronation: 1598
- Born: 26 June 1575; Halle (Saale), Archbishopric of Magdeburg, Holy Roman Empire
- Died: 8 April 1612 (aged 36); Copenhagen, Denmark
- Burial: Roskilde Cathedral
- Spouse: Christian IV of Denmark (m. 1597)
- Issue: Christian, Prince-Elect of Denmark; Frederick III of Denmark; Ulrik, Prince-Bishop of Schwerin
- House: Hohenzollern
- Father: Joachim Frederick, Margrave of Brandenburg
- Mother: Catherine of Brandenburg-Küstrin

Anne Catherine of Brandenburg (26 June 1575 – 8 April 1612) was Queen of Denmark and Norway from 1597 to 1612 as the first wife of King Christian IV of Denmark.

== Life ==
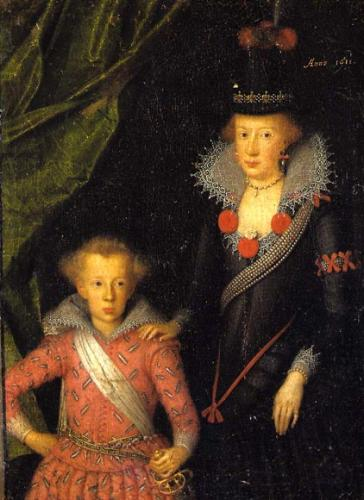
Anne Catherine with her son Christian, the Prince-elect in 1611, by Jacob van Doort

Anne Catherine was born in Halle (Saale) and raised in Wolmirstedt. Her parents were Joachim Frederick, Margrave of Brandenburg and his first wife Catherine of Brandenburg-Küstrin. Christian met her on his journey in Germany in 1595 and decided to marry her. In 1596, Anne Catherine and her parents were present at his coronation, and the next year, the marriage was arranged.

Her personal motto - which can be seen on top of the gate to the courtyard of Frederiksborg Castle - was: "Rege me Jehova spirito sanctu tuo" ("Guide me, Jehovah, with your holy spirit.")

Anne Catherine became Queen of Denmark and Norway on 27 November 1597 when she was married to Christian IV. The wedding took place in the castle of Haderslevhus in South Jutland the year after the coronation of Christian IV. She was crowned queen in 1598. She was given Beate Huitfeldt as the head of her ladies-in-waiting. She gave birth to seven children, but only three lived to adulthood: Christian, the Prince-Elect, who died a year before his father, Frederick III, who introduced absolute monarchy to Denmark and Norway, and Ulrik, who was murdered in 1633. Their two daughters, Sophia and Elisabeth, and their eldest named son, Frederick, died at a very young age.

Queen Anne Catherine does not seem to have had much political influence. She often accompanied King Christian on his travels. In her time, she was praised for her modesty and deep religious feelings. There is no mention as to whether the marriage was happy or not, but her spouse took mistresses at the end of their marriage, notably with Kirsten Madsdatter. The building of the Rosenborg Castle began while she was queen, but the extent of her influence on the building and its interior is not known. Despite her good relationship with the Lutheran bishop, she called upon a Calvinist vicar to give her the last sacrament on her death bed.

She died in Copenhagen and was buried in the Roskilde Cathedral.

== Issue ==
1. Stillborn son (1598).
2. Frederick, Hereditary Prince of Denmark (15 August 1599 – 9 September 1599), died in infancy.
3. Christian, Hereditary Prince of Denmark (10 April 1603 – 2 June 1647), married Magdalene Sibylle of Saxony.
4. Princess Sophie (4 January 1605 – 7 September 1605), died in infancy.
5. Princess Elisabeth (16 March 1606 – 24 October 1608), died in early childhood.
6. Frederick III (18 March 1609 – 9 February 1670), married Sophie Amalie of Brunswick-Calenberg and had issue.
7. Ulrik, Prince-Bishop of Schwerin (2 February 1611 – 12 August 1633), died unmarried.

Anne Catherine of Brandenburg House of Hohenzollern Born: 26 June 1575 Died: 8 April 1612
Royal titles
Preceded by Sophie of Mecklenburg-Schwerin	Queen consort of Denmark and Norway; 1597–1612	Succeeded by Sophie Amalie of Brunswick-Lüneburg
