= Hedwig of Denmark =

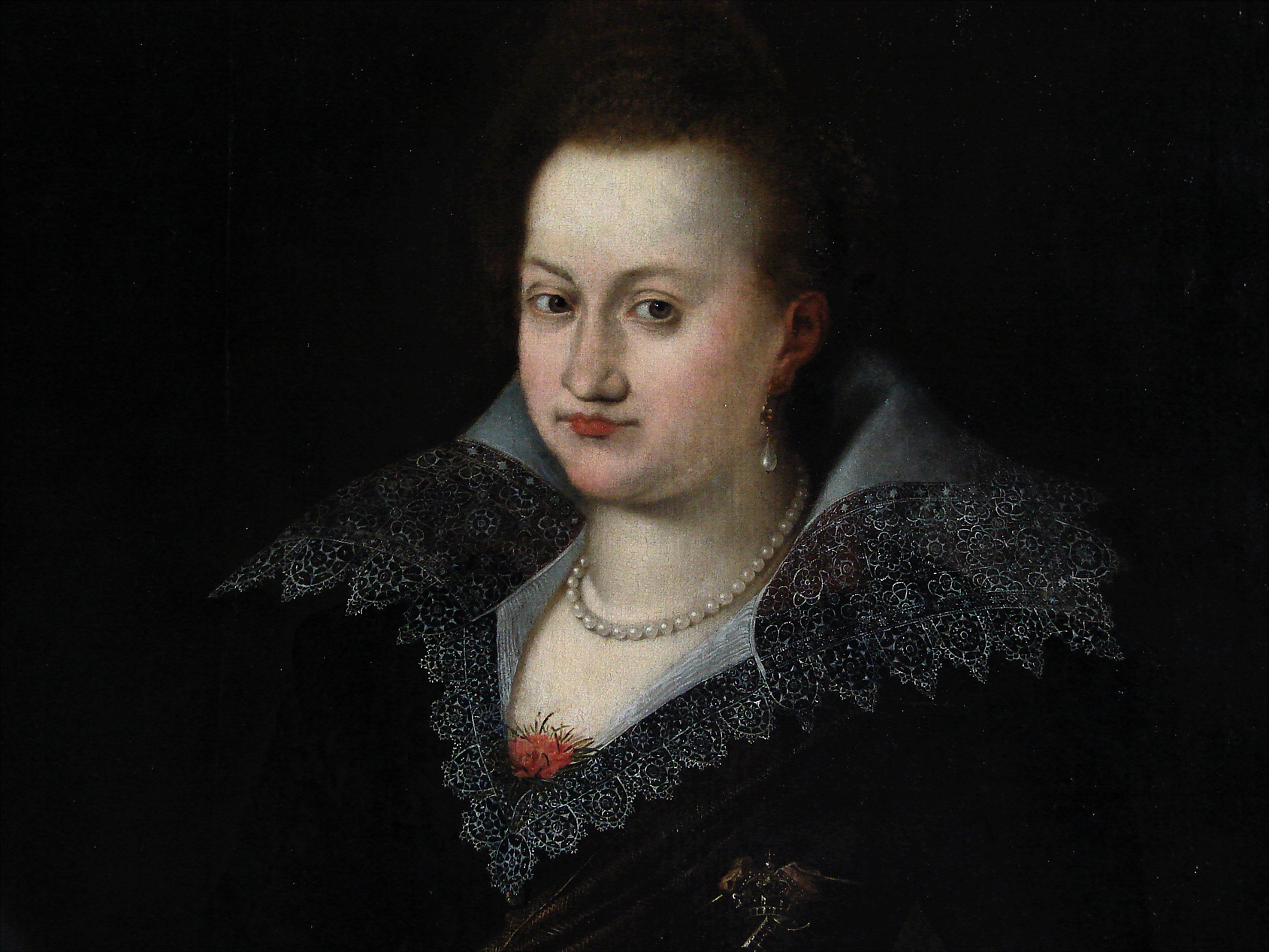

Electress consort of Saxony
- Tenure: 1602–1611
- Born: 5 August 1581; Frederiksborg Palace, Hillerød, Kingdom of Denmark
- Died: 26 November 1641 (aged 60); Schloss Lichtenburg, Prettin, Electorate of Saxony
- Burial: Freiberg, Saxony
- Spouse: Christian II, Elector of Saxony
- House: Oldenburg
- Father: Frederick II of Denmark
- Mother: Sophie of Mecklenburg-Güstrow

Princess Hedwig of Denmark (5 August 1581 – 26 November 1641) was the youngest daughter of King Frederick II of Denmark and Sophie of Mecklenburg-Güstrow, and Electress of Saxony from 1602 to 1611 as the wife of Christian II. The marriage was childless, and her husband was succeeded by his brother John George. After Christian's death in 1611, the Dowager Electress Hedwig held a powerful position in Saxony.

== Early life and marriage ==
Hedwig was born on 5 August 1581 at Frederiksborg Palace in Denmark, the seventh child and fourth daughter of King Frederick II of Denmark and Sophie of Mecklenburg-Güstrow. One of her three sisters was Princess Anne of Denmark, future queen of England and Scotland, and one of her brothers became Christian IV of Denmark. Like her siblings, she spent most of her childhood away from Denmark: in her case with her mother's relative in Mecklenburg.

She was married on 12 September 1602 to Christian II, Elector of Saxony, her first cousin once removed, in Dresden. The nine-year marriage was childless. Christian died in Dresden on 23 June 1611.

== Life as Dowager Electress ==
When her husband died in 1611, Hedwig became Dowager Electress in charge of the police and courts. She shared her authority with the new Elector, but her subjects considered her their sovereign. She was able to maintain her independence from her brother-in-law when it came to trade and commerce. She acted independently, granting letters of free passage etc., something that was normally the prerogative of the Elector. She founded churches and aided the poor, sick, and disabled.

In May 1612 she was a godparent to Christian Albert, the short-lived eldest son of John George, Elector of Saxony, and Duchess Magdalene Sibylle of Prussia.

As sister of the Danish King Christian IV and sister-in-law of King James I of England, she cultivated important connections for her brother-in-law, Elector John George I, and was involved in arranging the marriages of five of his seven children. Because of her position and connections, her territories were hardly attacked during the Thirty Years' War.

As a widow, she mainly lived in Lichtenburg, but she visited Denmark on her mother's funeral in 1631 and at the wedding of her nephew Christian, Prince-Elect of Denmark in 1634.

She died on 26 November 1641 at Schloss Lichtenburg in Prettin.

== Ancestry ==
Ancestors of Hedwig of Denmark

16. Christian I of Denmark (=#28)
8. Frederick I of Denmark (=#14)
17. Dorothea of Brandenburg (=#29)
4. Christian III of Denmark
18. John Cicero, Elector of Brandenburg
9. Anna of Brandenburg
19. Margaret of Thuringia
2. Frederick II of Denmark
20. John V, Duke of Saxe-Lauenburg
10. Magnus I, Duke of Saxe-Lauenburg
21. Dorothea of Brandenburg
5. Dorothea of Saxe-Lauenburg
22. Henry IV, Duke of Brunswick-Lüneburg
11. Catherine of Brunswick
23. Catherine of Pomerania-Wolgast
1. Hedwig of Denmark
24. Magnus II, Duke of Mecklenburg
12. Albrecht VII, Duke of Mecklenburg
25. Sophie of Pomerania-Wolgast
6. Ulrich, Duke of Mecklenburg
26. Joachim I Nestor, Elector of Brandenburg
13. Anna of Brandenburg
27. Elizabeth of Denmark
3. Sophie of Mecklenburg-Güstrow
28. Christian I of Denmark (=#16)
14. Frederick I of Denmark (=#8)
29. Dorothea of Brandenburg (=#17)
7. Elizabeth of Denmark
30. Bogislaw X, Duke of Pomerania
15. Sophie of Pomerania
31. Anna of Poland

Royal titles
Preceded by Sophie of Brandenburg	Electress consort of Saxony; 1602–1611	Succeeded by Magdalene Sibylle of Prussia
