= Sophie of Mecklenburg-Güstrow =

Queen of Denmark and Norway from 1572 to 1588

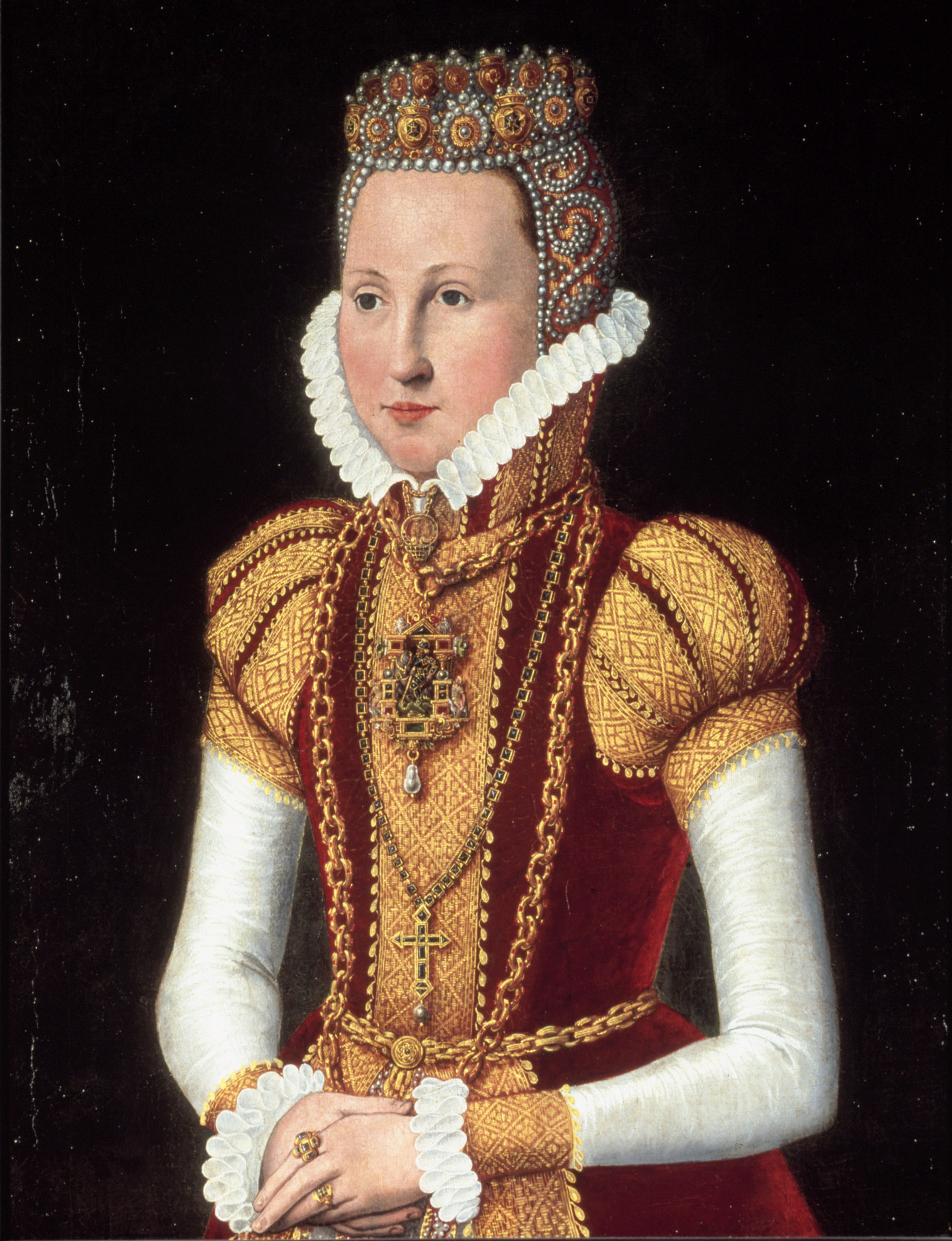
- Portrait by Hans Knieper, c. 1572; Rosenborg Castle, Copenhagen

Queen consort of Denmark and Norway
- Tenure: 20 July 1572 – 4 April 1588
- Born: 4 September 1557; Wismar
- Died: 4 October 1631 (aged 74); Nykøbing Castle, Falster
- Burial: Roskilde Cathedral
- Spouse: Frederick II of Denmark (m. 1572; died 1588)
- Issue: Elizabeth, Duchess of Brunswick; Anne, Queen of England, Scotland, and Ireland; Christian IV, King of Denmark; Ulrich II, Prince-Bishop of Schwerin; Augusta, Duchess Holstein-Gottorp; Hedwig, Electress of Saxony; John, Prince of Schleswig-Holstein
- House: Mecklenburg-Schwerin
- Father: Ulrich III of Mecklenburg-Güstrow
- Mother: Elizabeth of Denmark

Sophie of Mecklenburg-Güstrow (Sophia; 4 September 1557 – 4 October 1631) was Queen of Denmark and Norway from 1572 to 1588 as the wife of Frederick II. She was the mother of Christian IV and Anne of Denmark, and served as regent of the duchies of Schleswig and Holstein from 1590 to 1594. Especially noted for her effective management of her extensive dower lands and a large credit operation, which made her one of the wealthiest landowners and financiers of her time, she was an influential political figure in Northern Europe.

The only child of Ulrich III of Mecklenburg-Güstrow and Elizabeth of Denmark, Sophie married her first cousin Frederick in 1572, aged fourteen. Their union is widely described as unusually affectionate for the period. As queen, she maintained her own household and patronages and pursued interests in natural philosophy, astrology, alchemy, chemistry and iatrochemistry. She supported scholars including Anders Vedel and Tycho Brahe, whom she visited on Ven in 1586 and later. She did not, however, exercise formal political power during the reign of her husband. Following Frederick’s death in 1588, Sophie sought to lead the regency for the underage Christian IV, bringing her into conflict with the Council of the Realm. Although she did not prevail in directing the royal regency, she was recognised by the Danish nobility and Emperor Rudolf II as regent in the duchies until 1594, after which she withdrew to her dower lands, consisting of Lolland and Falster. From there she continued to intervene in affairs of state through correspondence, credit, and marriage diplomacy, arranging advantageous Protestant alliances for her daughters and for Christian IV with the houses of Stuart, Welf (Brunswick-Lüneburg), Hohenzollern (Brandenburg), Holstein-Gottorp and Wettin (Saxony), often contributing substantial funds for jewellery and dowries herself.

As dowager, Sophie reorganised her dower estate's administration, undertook agrarian improvements, and operated an extensive lending business. By advancing large loans at interest, among others to Christian IV, James VI and I and several German princes, she secured influence over policy and wartime finance. Drawing on her "inexhaustible coffers", she provided financial support to the Danish–Norwegian realm, subsidising major royal initiatives in construction and warfare. By contemporary and modern accounts she amassed an extraordinary fortune, becoming the richest woman in Northern Europe and, by some assessments, the second-wealthiest individual in Europe after Maximilian I of Bavaria. At her death, James Howell, secretary to the English Ambassador in Denmark, described her as the "richest Queen in Christendom".

Sophie’s political role extended beyond finance. Through steady correspondence and mediation among Protestant courts, she influenced Danish foreign policy during the confessional conflicts of her son’s reign, participating in efforts to form a Protestant league, and conducting considerable diplomacy in the early phases of the Thirty Years’ War. Historians note that through these strategies she "[financed] diplomacy and war", and her efforts contributed to the diplomatic course leading to the Treaty of Lübeck (1629), which ended Denmark’s active participation in the conflict.

Earlier historiography often minimised or disparaged her agency, dismissing her as power-hungry and rapacious. However, some 19th-century writers, notably Ellen Jørgensen, praised her "unparalleled skill" and "indomitable resourcefulness". Recent scholarship reassesses her widowhood and emphasises her entrepreneurship and, in particular, her capacity to entrench herself as a pervasive force within the political landscape of late Reformation Denmark and northern Europe. She died at Nykøbing Castle in 1631 and was buried in Roskilde Cathedral.

== Early life ==
Born in Wismar on 4 September 1557, Sophie of Mecklenburg-Güstrow was the daughter of Duke Ulrich III of Mecklenburg-Güstrow and Princess Elizabeth of Denmark.

== Queen ==
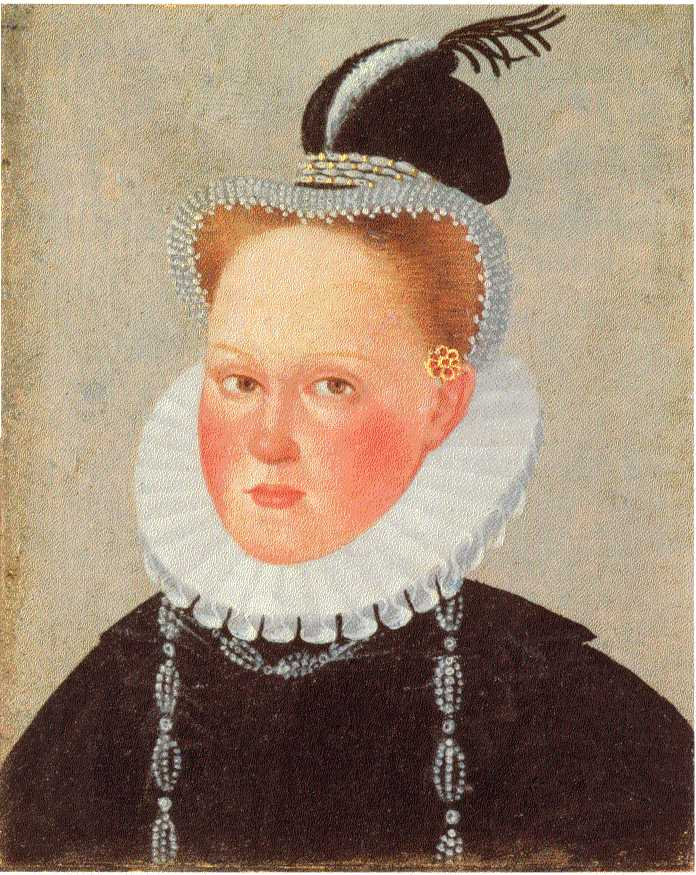
Portrait miniature of a young Queen Sophie, aged approximately 23, in ca. 1580.

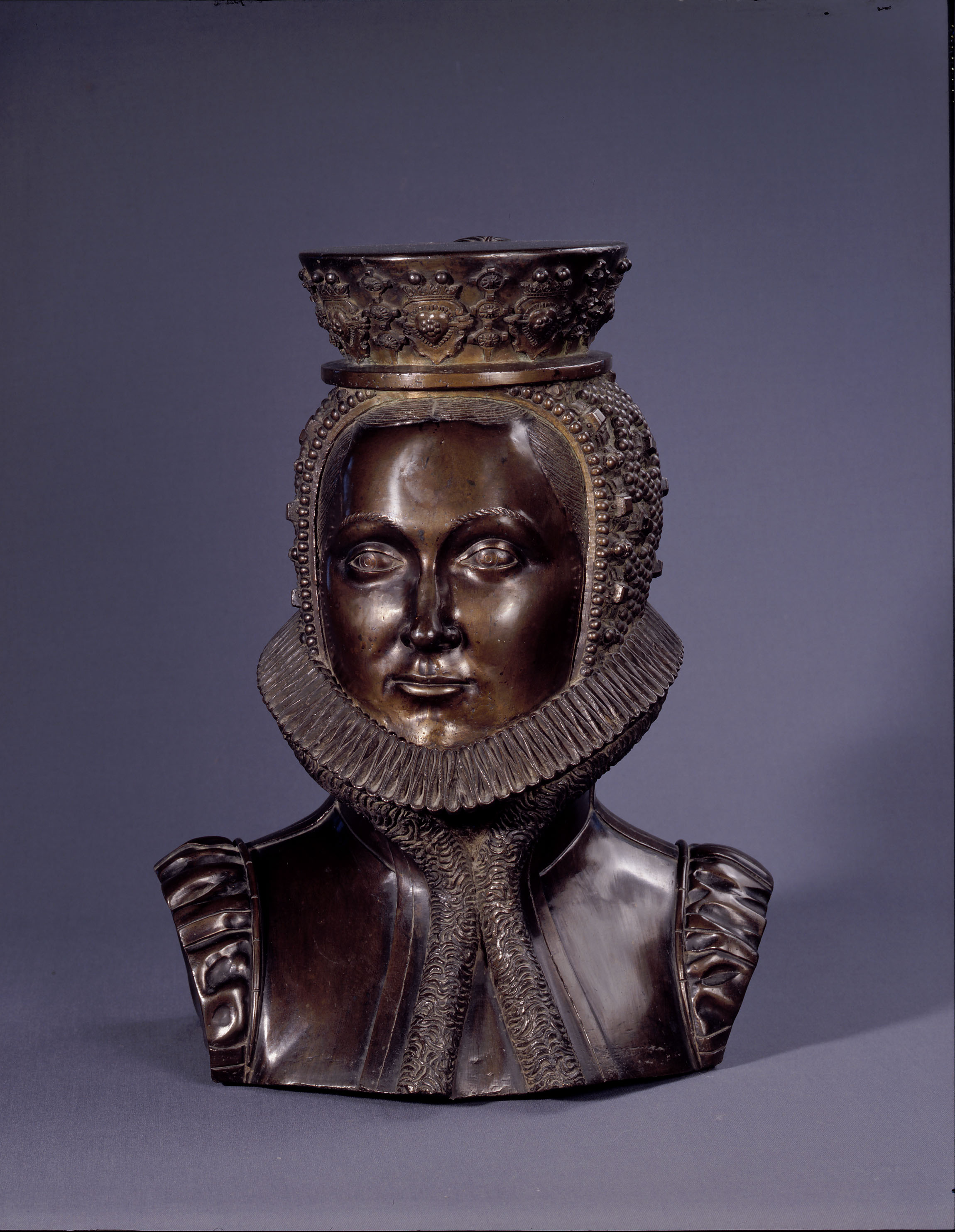
Bronze bust of a youthful Queen Sophie, made by J.G. van der Schardt, between 1578 and 1579.

At the age of fourteen Sophie, on 20 July 1572, married Frederick II of Denmark in Copenhagen; he was thirty-eight. She was crowned the following day. They were first half-cousins, through their grandfather, Frederick I, King of Denmark and Norway. They met at Nykøbing Castle, when it had been arranged for the king to meet with Margaret of Pomerania, daughter of Philip I of Pomerania. She was brought to Denmark by Sophie's parents, who decided to also bring their own daughter. Sophie found favour with the king, who betrothed himself to her, and married her six months later. King Frederick had been in love with the noblewoman Anne Corfitzdatter Hardenberg for many years, but was unable to marry her due to her being a noblewoman, not a princess, the opposition of the Danish Privy Council as well as eventually Anne herself.

Despite the age difference between Sophie and Frederick, the marriage was a happy one. Queen Sophie was a loving mother, nursing her children personally during their illnesses. When Frederick was sick with malaria in 1575, she personally nursed him and wrote many worried letters to her father about his progress. King Frederick was well known for being fond of drinking and hunting, but he was a loving spouse to Sophie, writing of her with great fondness in his personal diary (where he kept careful track of where she and their children were in the country) and there is no evidence of extramarital affairs on the part of either spouse. Their marriage is described as having been harmonious. All of their children were sent to live with her parents in Mecklenburg for the first years of their lives, with the possible exception of the last son, Hans, as it was the belief at the time that the parents would indulge their children too much. She showed a keen interest in science and visited the astronomer Tycho Brahe. She was also interested in the old songs of folklore.

=== Matchmaker ===
Around the time of Frederick's death, Sophie's most important function was as a matchmaker for her children. Her daughter, Anne of Denmark, married James VI of Scotland and became queen consort in 1589. She arranged the marriage against the will of the council. When James VI came to Denmark, she gave him a present of 10,000 dalers. She was also deeply involved in the negotiations that led to the wedding of Princess Elizabeth to Henry Julius, Duke of Brunswick-Lüneburg. She oversaw the levying of 150,000 dalers for the two weddings and other expenses, and spent herself 50,000 on jewellery.

In 1596, she arranged the marriage of her daughter Princess Augusta to John Adolf, Duke of Holstein-Gottorp, which improved Denmark's connections to the north German Lutheran states. Finally, in 1602, she negotiated the marriage of Hedwig to Christian II, Elector of Saxony. She also played a key role in finding appropriate spouses for her younger sons. She was the main negotiator in the marriage arrangements between her son Christian, heir to the throne, and Princess Anne Catherine of Brandenburg, whom Sophie called a "pure pearl".

== Widowhood and queen-dowager ==
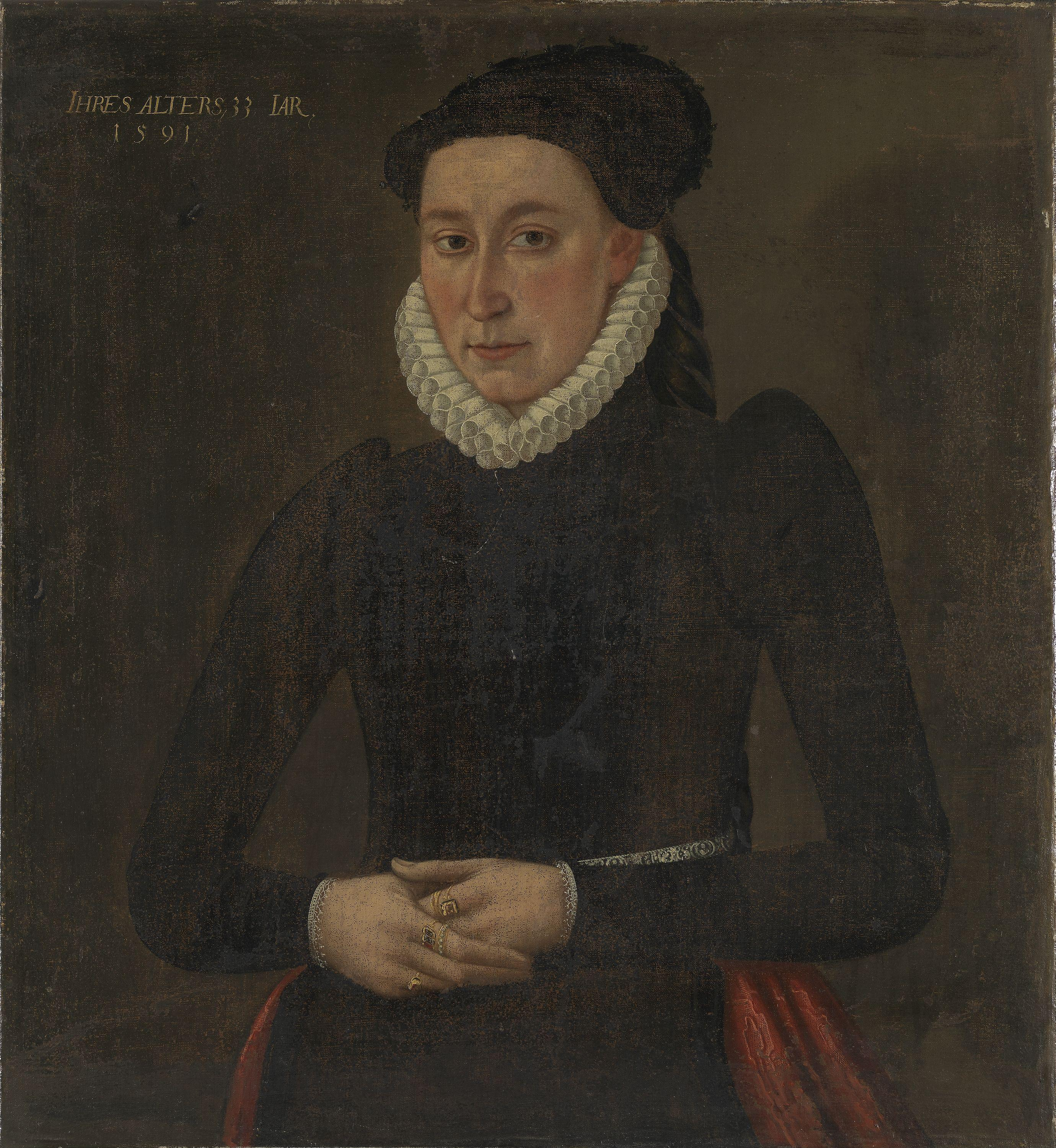
Sophie of Mecklenborg, newly widowed, in 1591.

=== Aftermath of Frederick's death ===
Frederick II died on 4 April 1588, at Antvorskov Castle. Their son, now king Christian IV, was just 10 years old, and a regency council (Danish: formynderregering) was therefore to be set up to serve as the trustees of the royal authority. Already on 15 April, the Council of the Realm had hastily assembled at Antvorskov and appointed a regency. It was to be led by Chancellor Niels Kaas (1535–1594) and consisted of the council members Peder Munk (1534–1623), Jørgen Ottesen Rosenkrantz (1523–1596) and Christoffer Valkendorff (1525–1601).

Although it was common in Europe for a dowager queen to act as regent for her minor children, the Council of the Realm pointedly excluded Sophie from the regency. She was given a ceremonial role, allowing her to maintain her royal court. During Frederick II’s funeral in June 1588, she asserted her influence by insisting on a more lavish and expensive ceremony and procession than the one planned by the council, arguing that a modest funeral would harm the Crown’s international reputation. She also arranged for the dowries for her daughters and secured her own allowance, all independently and in defiance of the council. During the first two years of her widowhood, she resided mainly at Kronborg Castle and Frederiksborg Castle.

=== Regency of the duchies and conflicts with the council ===
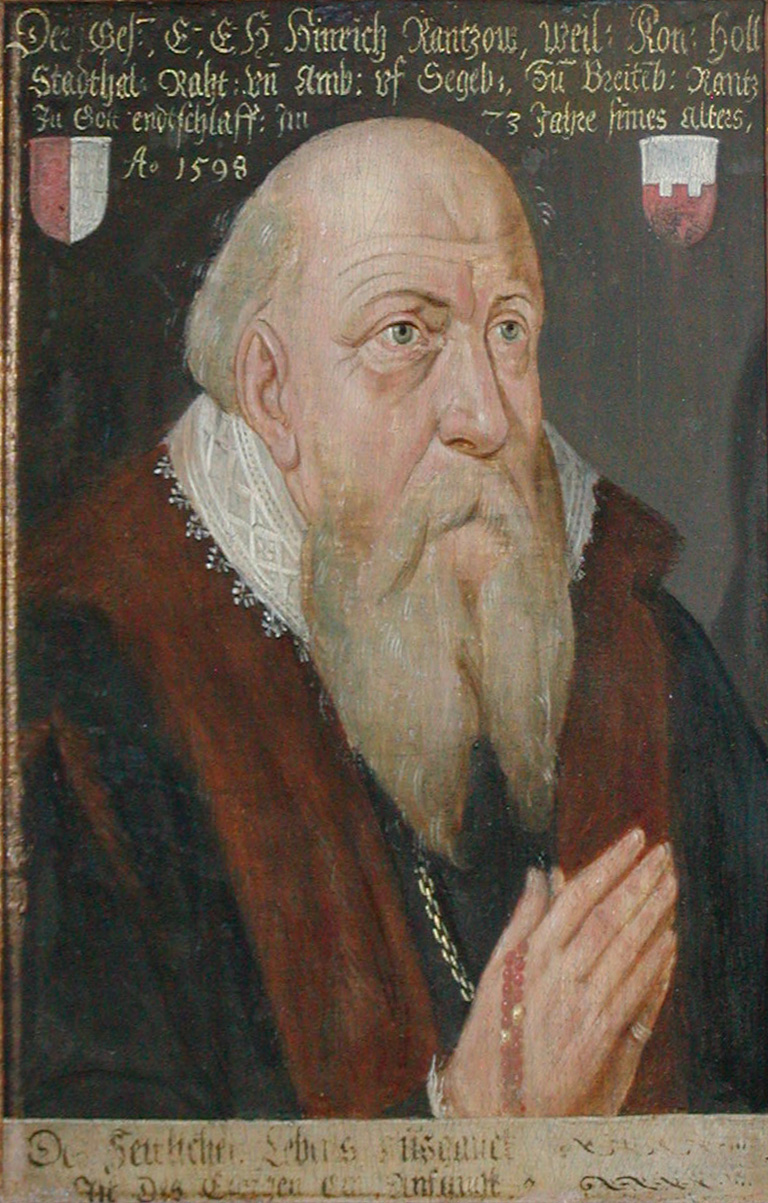
Heinrich Rantzau, Governor of the Danish royal share in the Duchy of Holstein, who, having championed Dowager Queen Sophie’s regency in expectation of a pliable ruler, swiftly turned into her staunch opponent over the governance of the duchies.

While sidelined in Denmark, Sophie concentrated on the duchies of Schleswig and Holstein, where — as the children’s mother — she laid claim to a regency (Danish: formynderskab) on behalf of Christian, Ulrik, and Hans. These duchies were governed under a dual framework: Schleswig was a Danish fief, whereas Holstein belonged to the Holy Roman Empire.

At first, there was talk of German princes acting as guardians, yet the Danish governor (Danish: statholder) in the royal part of the duchies, Heinrich Rantzau, and the regional nobility deemed it unnecessary, citing Sophie as the more appropriate figure, given her status as both dowager queen and "mother of the country" (Danish: landemoder, lit. 'land mother'). Following negotiations, Sophie formally accepted in September 1590 at Haderslev to govern on Christian’s behalf and simultaneously administer the royal fiefs on behalf of all three princely sons.

Sophie acted energetically to defend her children’s claims, notably insisting that Ulrik and Hans should also be granted a share in governance and inheritance, effectively partitioning the duchies. This stance soon brought her into conflict with Rantzau and most of the Schleswig-Holstein nobility, who wanted to avoid the fragmentation of authority among multiple princes. To curtail Sophie’s ambitions, the nobility consented to only a modest arrangement. On 2 May 1591, a compromise reached in Segeberg stated that official documents concerning the royal fiefs would include Ulrik and Hans by name, but offer them no real authority. Frustrated, Sophie increasingly looked to Rudolf II, Holy Roman Emperor — overlord of Holstein — for support. She wrote a series of letters urging an imperial endorsement of an actual partition of the duchies. Meanwhile, tensions with Rantzau deepened: they clashed openly over administrative control, and Sophie denounced what she saw as his attempts to dominate the duchies. In March 1593, disagreements erupted at a diet in Kiel, where Rantzau walked out in protest.

Seeking to circumvent Sophie, Rantzau and Danish magnates persuaded the Emperor to declare Christian IV of age on 16 April 1593. Sophie immediately asked that Ulrik likewise be declared to be of age, hoping to prevent Christian from governing alone. In August 1593, the Emperor did indeed issue an imperial decree requiring partition of the so-called "royal portion" (Danish: den kongelige del) and Rudolf II specifically also reaffirmed that Sophie’s should remain regent for Ulrik and Hans until such a division was completed.

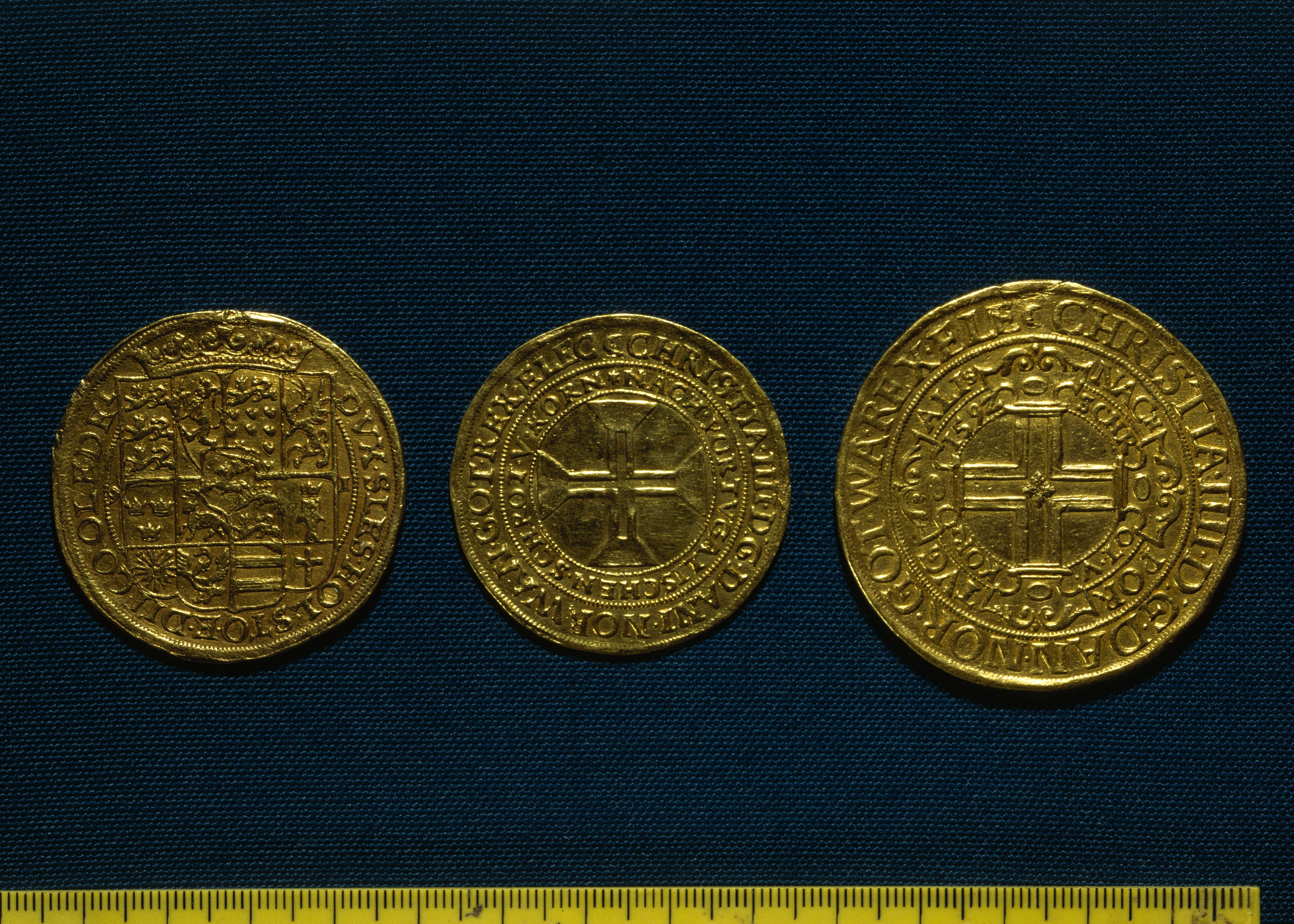
Português coins minted in Haderslev 1591-93 by Sophie. A testament to her possession of actual state power, the coinage was vigorously protested by the Council.

Sophie’s allies in the duchies were few yet invaluable. Her father, Ulrich III of Mecklenburg, advised her extensively, sent experienced legal envoys to Denmark, and was appointed imperial commissioner in August 1593, bolstering Sophie’s efforts to partition the duchies. She also enjoyed firm backing from Hans Blome, a royal counsellor fiercely opposed to Governor Rantzau. Beyond these ties, Sophie formed an alliance with Dowager Duchess Christine of Hesse, who initially sought hereditary rights for her son, Duke Philip of Gottorp. Although Christine agreed to an election — rather than hereditary inheritance — to avoid losing all power to Christian IV, she and Sophie still stood together against the Danish Council and nobility. When Philip died in October 1590, Sophie quickly aligned with his successor, John Adolf.

Despite the imperial directives, events on the ground favored the position of both the nobility and Christian. At a diet in Flensburg on 1 September 1593, Christian IV appeared with the full backing of the Council, formally took over the government of the duchies, and upheld the estates’ privileges. By 2 September, a formal report from that Diet rejected partition altogether. Local officials insisted that Schleswig was a fief of the Danish Realm, beyond the Emperor’s rightful intervention, and that Holstein could not in practice be separated from Schleswig. Sophie continued petitioning the Emperor, yet her opposition had scant effect.

As regent for Christian IV, the Dowager Queen had significant political power for several years, and in 1591-93, she had gold coins struck at the Mint in Haderslev. The Council strongly objected, criticizing the poor striking quality, errors in heraldry, and alleged low fineness. However, a later German metallurgical analysis contradicted these claims, proving the coins met high-quality standards, with only a 1% deviation from Emperor Ferdinand I’s 1559 Reichsmünzordnung. The Council’s opposition likely stemmed from political concerns over Sophie’s independent economic power, rather than the coinage’s actual value. Despite their protests, she refused full compliance, modifying some details but retaining Christian IV’s crowned portrait, reinforcing her authority.

=== Dismissal as regent and mediator ===
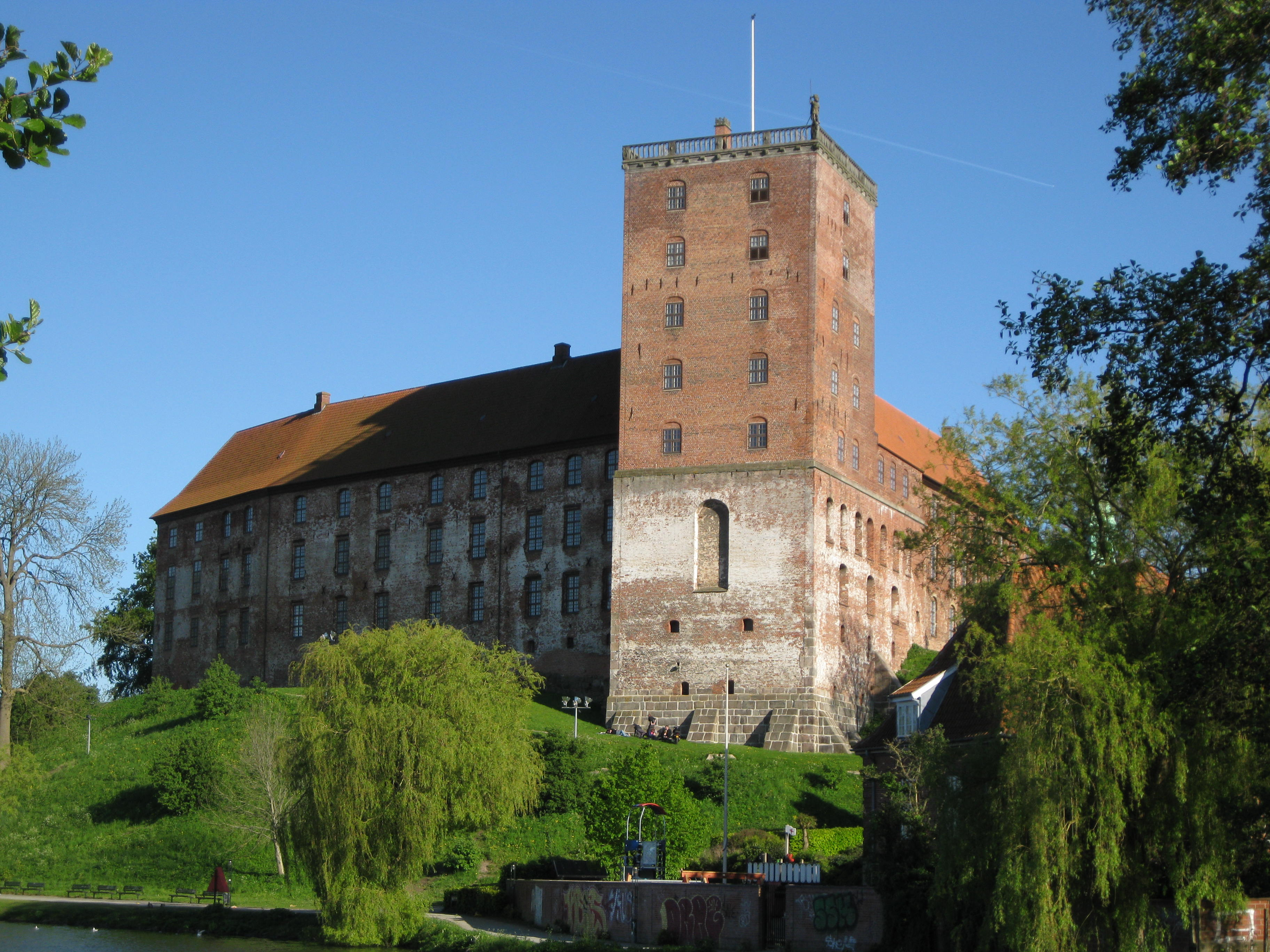
Koldinghus Castle, where Queen Dowager Sophie resided and held court during her regency. In April 1594, the council dismissed the entirety of Sophie's royal household at Koldinghus, forcing her to leave.

During her regency over the duchies (1588–1594), Dowager Queen Sophie primarily held court at Koldinghus Castle, while also frequently residing at Cismar Abbey, near Grömitz, when visiting Schleswig and Holstein. After her dismissal as regent, the Dowager Queen continued to reside at Koldinghus with her household. In April 1594, a year after her dismissal, the Council forced the Dowager Queen to leave the court by dismissing her entire household staff. Displeased, she complained to her father and lamented that she was "forced to go away". In another letter to her father from December 1594, Sophie voiced frustration at governor Rantzau, whom she claimed was far more interested in advancing his "own advantage" than in reconciling "mother and son". She moved to the newly rebuilt Nykøbing Castle, together with her younger daughters, Hedwig and Augusta. In a letter to her father, she bitterly accepted defeat, writing: "If the councillors become richer now that I have left the court, time will tell. I thank God that I am gone, and even if I were offered 10,000 daler a year to stay, I would not do it." In response, Sophie began securing the resources she would need to remain an influential figure within Denmark.

Retiring to her widow’s estate did not end her efforts to safeguard her sons’ interests. In November 1595, Christian IV reconciled with his mother during a visit to his grandfather, Duke Ulrich III, in Mecklenburg. The following year brought an official settlement, wherein Christian agreed to provide for his siblings, though he continued to refuse any new division of the duchies. By 1602, he granted his brother, Ulrik, 200,000 rigsdaler as compensation for relinquishing all feudal rights, while the youngest brother, John, had already secured the Grand Principality of Tver upon his 1601 betrothal to Tsar Boris Godunov’s daughter, Xenia Borisovna.

After 1602, Sophie was repeatedly called upon by both Christian IV and Ulrik to mediate in their ongoing inheritance dispute. Adopting a different and more prudent approach, she generally refused to reopen the matter — encouraging Ulrik to approach Christian directly and warning him not to insist on any claim as a right — yet she still urged Christian to show some generosity toward his brother. In 1609, Sophie famously admonished Ulrik and Christian for neglecting their own affairs in favor of "merriment and drink" criticizing their lack of decisiveness and hinting at her frustration over repeatedly having to "settle [their] matters". In 1610, through Sophie’s mediation, Ulrik received lifetime possession of the Schwabstedt fief and an additional 120,000 rigsdaler, augmenting the 1602 settlement.

=== Landowner and successful entrepreneur ===
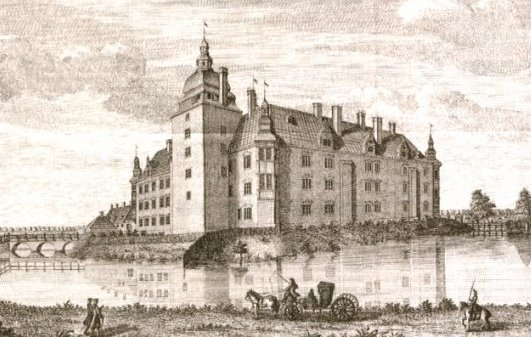
Lithography of Nykøbing Castle, which was the seat of Queen Sophie's estate.

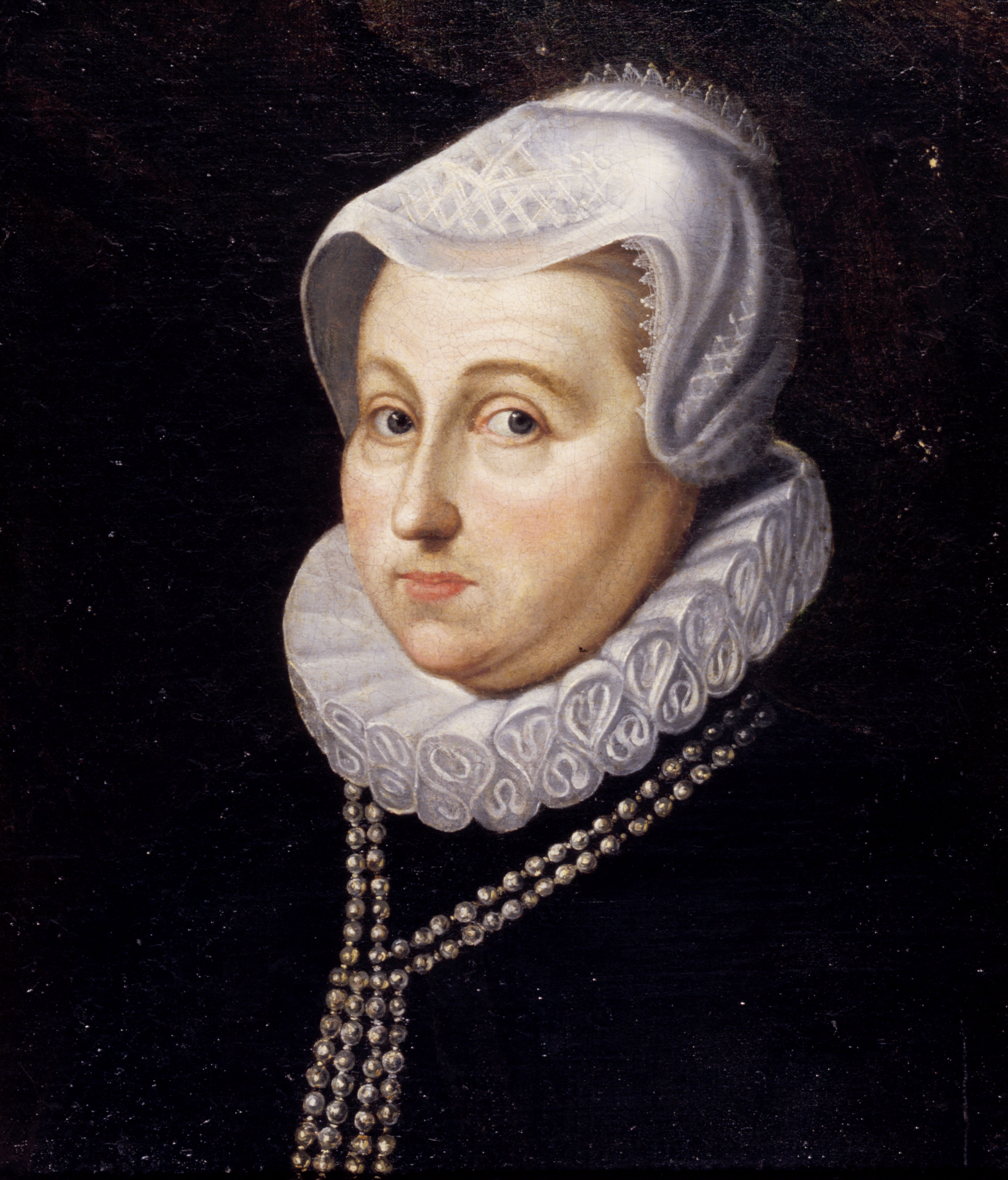
Portrait of Queen Sophie in c. 1610. The portrait is a remains of a lost full-length portrait painted by the Dutch painter Pieter Isaacsz.

As dowager-queen, Sophie was entitled to 'Dowager-pension' (Danish: Livgeding, lit. 'support of life') as well as the castles that comprised her morning gift. These vast estates included Denmark's fourth-largest island Lolland, and the neighbouring island Falster, on which the castle of Nykøbing was situated, which she also received. She also received Aalholm Castle, Halsted Priory, Vennerslund, Ravnsborg, and the fiefs belonging thereto. She succeeded in obtaining 30,000 rigsdaler from her late husband's liquid assets, as well as an annual income of 8,000 rigsdaler from the Sound Dues. Over a number of years, her crown property on Lolland and Falster was expanded, with large properties being transferred to the widow's estate, including Corselitze and Skørringe, whose holdings on Falster totalled over 100 farm estates.

During her long widowhood, Sophie mainly devoted herself to managing her estates, where she was effectively an independent ruler. She protected the residents of her dowerlands and engaged in large-scale trade and in money-lending. She took a keen interest in new agricultural technology, converted her land to large-scale farming, sold grain and cattle to northern Germany through her large established network in the principalities, built mills and was especially interested in cattle breeding, which was an important source of income during this period. The still existing Queen's Warehouse in Nakskov was constructed for her in 1589–1591.

The Dowager Queen Sophie managed her estates in Lolland-Falster so well, that her son could borrow money from her on several occasions for his wars. She helped to fund her son Christian IV's military campaign against Sweden in 1611, the Kalmar War, and his entry into the Thirty Years War in 1615. Likewise, she also assisted her son with a loan in 1605 of 140,000 Danish rigsdaler, whereupon Christian launched a series of expeditions to Greenland. In 1614, Christian IV took out another loan of 210,000 rigsdaler from his mother. In 1621, the Danish Council of the Realm obtained two loans of 100,000 and 280,000 rigsdaler respectively from the Dowager Queen, to cover the state's deficit. The majority of the Dowager Queen's loans to her son were never repaid.

In 1620–21, Dowager Queen Sophie was the main contributor of a loan of 300,000 rigsdaler from the Danish state under Christian IV, to England under her son-in-law James VI and I. The interest rate was the "extremely favourable" 6%. In addition to her liquid assets amounting to millions of guilders, she also had extensive properties in the north of the Holy Roman Empire, pledged by princely creditors. The queen inspected these estates during her numerous journeys.

=== Political influence as widow ===
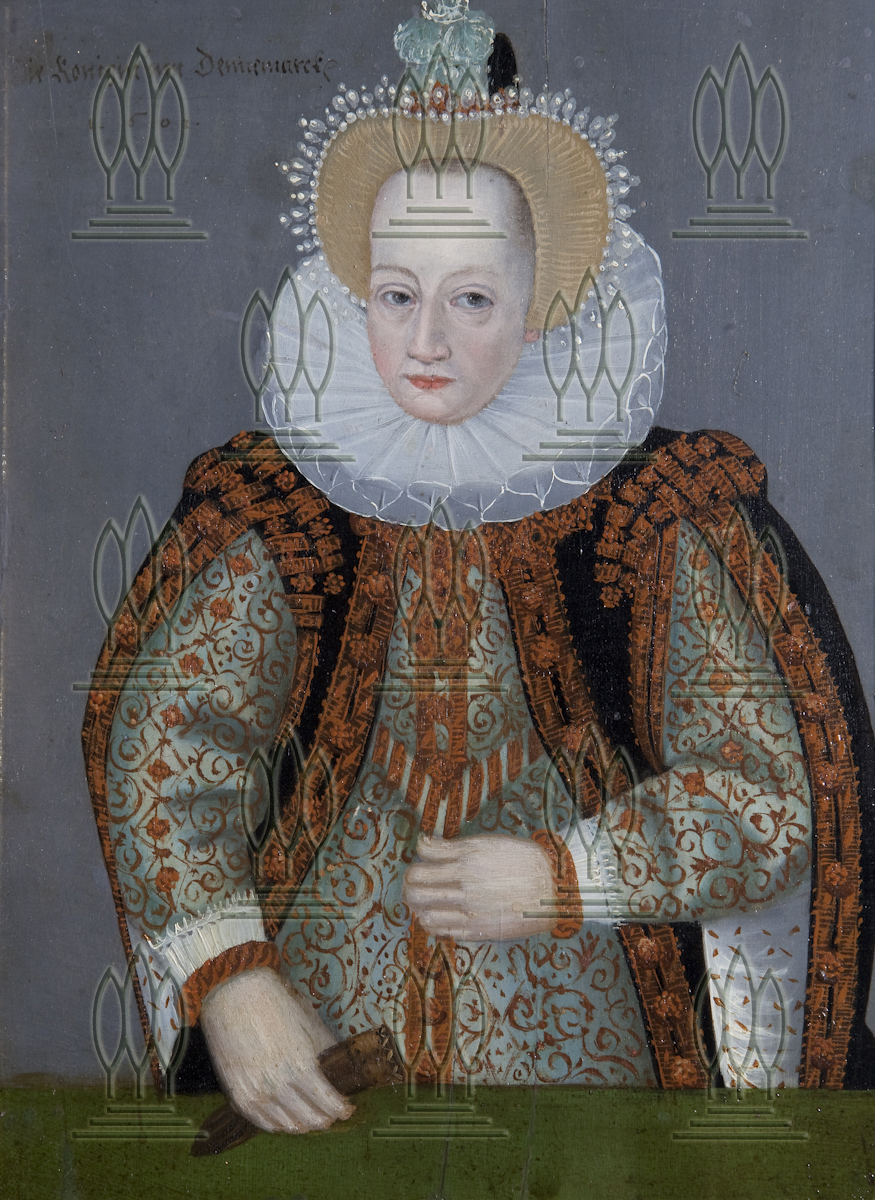
Sophie in c. 1601, in a German collection of small-format portraits of 17th century European rulers.

Because of her great wealth, Dowager Queen Sophie was able to exercise considerable influence on both Danish domestic affairs and the international politics of Northern Europe during the reign of her son, Christian IV (reigned 1596–1648). During a period from the death of her husband in 1588 until her death forty-three years later, she was active in the political life of Denmark. The queen dowager maintained a constant awareness of the current political developments in Europe and in the empire, through intensive correspondence with Protestant princes and her Mecklenburg relatives.

Domestically, Sophie influenced and supported the realm through continuous financial loans. Correspondence also shows that Sophie engaged in financial discussions with her son about the levying of taxes. Interestingly, the Danish Privy Council also granted her the concession that she was allowed to receive ambassadors and thus essentially conduct diplomacy on behalf of Denmark. Her extensive territories in southern Denmark also included the jurisdiction over a number of birks (judicial districts), where she held executive powers to appoint judges (Danish: birkedommer; viz. judge of a Danish District Court).

The Dowager Queen had notable political influence internationally as a consequence of her loans to several principalities of the Holy Roman Empire, whereby she "[financed] diplomacy and war", as described by historian Merry E. Wiesner-Hanks. During the Thirty Years' War, she lent money to several German Protestant princes, and among her creditors was her grandson Duke Frederick Ulrich of Brunswick-Lüneburg, who owed her 300,000 Danish rigsdaler, as well as her son-in-law John Adolf, Duke of Holstein-Gottorp, to whom she also lent 300,000 rigsdaler. She also conducted financial dealings with the leader of the Catholic forces, Count Tilly, with whom she wanted to form a joint creditors' front.

In December 1590, while at Brunswick attending her daughter Elizabeth's marriage to Henry Julius, Duke of Brunswick-Lüneburg, she received Scottish diplomat Sir John Skene, with whom she had previously negotiated the marriage of James VI of Scotland and Anne of Denmark. They conducted diplomatic discussions about consolidating a peaceful Protestant league in Europe.

In 1620, her grandson-in-law, Frederick V of the Palatinate, husband to her granddaughter Elizabeth Stuart, Queen of Bohemia, was deposed. The couple soon fled Prague and settled in The Hague, and during this period, Elizabeth and Sophie maintained frequent correspondence. In 1621, Queen Dowager Sophie engaged her connections in Hamburg and with "a mootherlie Caire", as described by Sir Robert Antrusther, she provided £20.000 (equivalent to approximately £4,500,000 today) to support the couple's immediate needs and "to serve the present want of heere highnes", as Sophie wrote.

During the latter stages of the Danish participation in the Thirty Years' War, Dowager Queen Sophie played a diplomatic role by engaging in extensive correspondence with various parties involved. She corresponded with, among others, numerous electors of the Holy Roman Empire, including John George I, Elector of Saxony, Maximilian I, Elector of Bavaria, Ferdinand of Bavaria, Archbishop-Elector of Cologne, Philipp Christoph von Sötem, Archbishop-Elector of Trier and Georg Friedrich von Greiffenklau, Archbishop-Elector of Mainz, through which she established numerous declarations from German princes for their assistance in the promotion and intervention on behalf of peace, and to send delegates to participate in peace negotiations in Lübeck, which in May 1629 led to the Treaty of Lübeck, ending the Danish intervention in the Thirty Years' War.

She also corresponded with Ferdinand II, Holy Roman Emperor, notably concerning her displeasure at the inadequate protection of her financial interests during the Thirty Years' War, where imperial supreme commander, Albrecht von Wallenstein, had seized the Mecklenburg territories of her debtors, and refused to pay interest or installments on the debt. Wallenstein had deposed her cousins and loanees, John Albert II, Duke of Mecklenburg-Güstrow, and Adolphus Frederick I, Duke of Mecklenburg-Schwerin in 1628, and Sophie provided "active support", interceding on behalf of the dukes, and became deeply involved in the situation. She repeatedly pleaded the case before the emperor, and by exerting her influence with her son, Christian IV, she was able to secure them temporary aid. Personally, she deferred interest and provided additional loans to the dukes, in addition to receiving Adolphus Frederick's wife and children at Nykøbing Castle, as the situation became unsafe in Schwerin. At the end of 1629, lively but inconclusive negotiations with the Imperial Court had taken place on the subject. Emperor Ferdinand II acquiesced to Sophie's requests and wrote several times to Wallenstein, but with no favourable outcome for the Dowager Queen.

=== Later life ===
She often visited Mecklenburg, and attended the wedding of her daughter, Princess Hedwig, to Christian II, Elector of Saxony, in Dresden in 1602. She travelled with her family to Bützow in March 1624, to attend the funeral of her son, Ulrik, Prince-Bishop of Schwerin. In 1603 she became involved in an inheritance dispute with her uncle, which remained unsolved at his death in 1610. In 1608, she managed to soften the punishment of Rigborg Brockenhuus, and in 1628, she was one of the influential people who prevented her son from having her grandson's lover, Anne Lykke, accused of witchcraft.

== Death, fortune and inheritance disputes ==
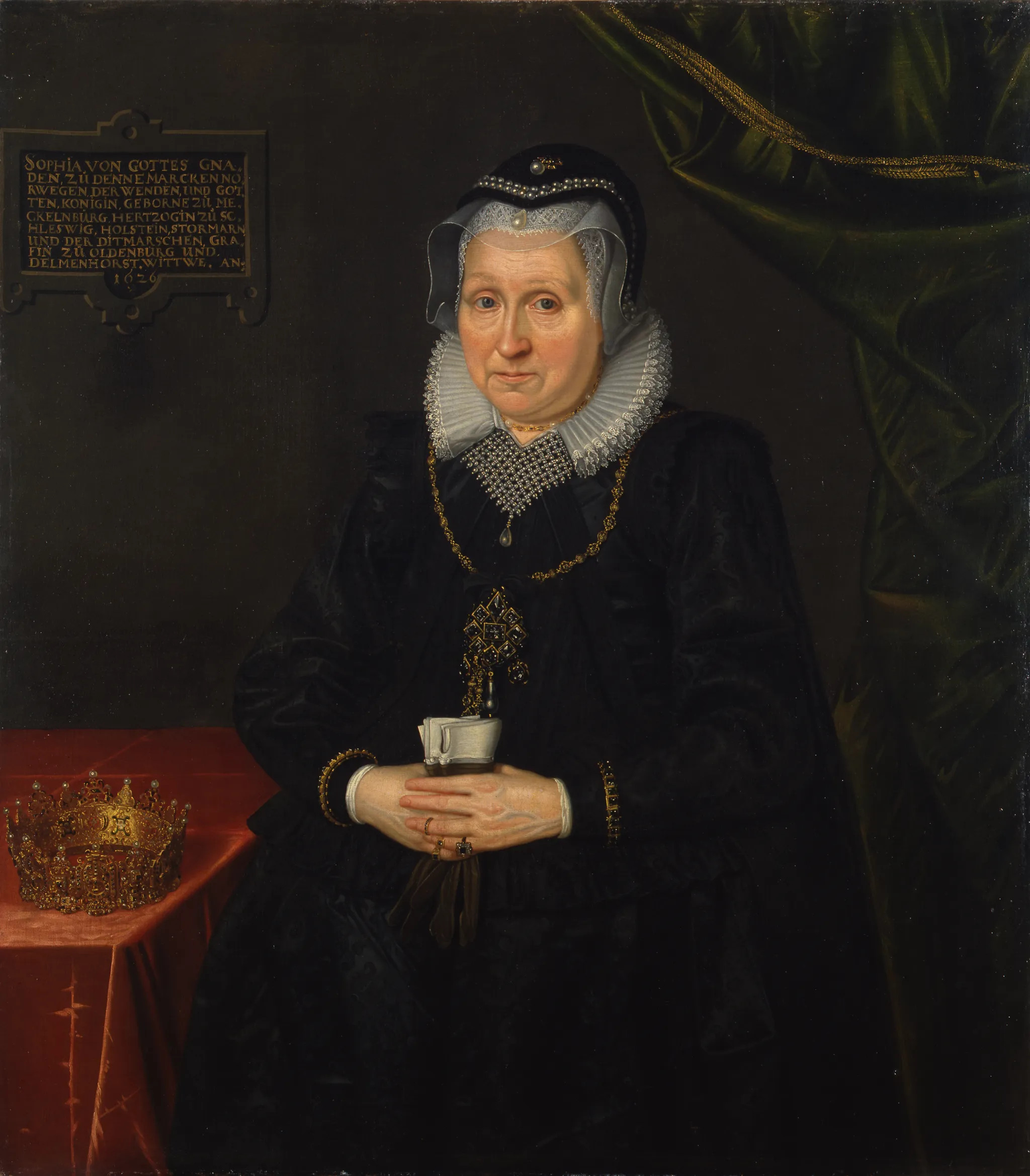
Dowager Queen Sophie, aged 70 years old, painted by Jacob van Doordt in 1626. This is the last known portrait of Sophie before her death.

At the end of September 1631, Christian IV arrived in Nykøbing. The Queen Dowager was seriously ill and was attended by the royal physician, Dr. Henning Arsenius. On 3 October the keys to the castle were handed over to the king's sister, Duchess Augusta, "because there is nothing more to hope for now than certain death". Sophie died the following day.

When Sophie died in 1631 at Nykøbing Falster, at the age of seventy-four, she was the richest woman in Europe. She left three children, Christian, Hedwig and Augusta, four had died before her. All three attended the funeral, said to be conducted with great splendour. Her body was brought from Nykøbing via Vordingborg to Copenhagen, and a solemn funeral service took place in the Church of Our Lady on 13 November 1631. The next day the body was taken to Roskilde Cathedral, and laid to rest in the Chapel of the Magi, beside her long-deceased husband. The coffin with the queen's remains has since been transferred to the crypt underneath the actual chapel.

The funeral sermon was delivered by royal chaplain Nicolas Wismarus, in which he praised the late queen’s wisdom and piety, describing that she "ruled land and people with counsel and understanding; she was also rich, possessed great goods, and governed in peace" and that "her righteousness must not be forgotten".

=== Fortune and inheritance ===
Sophie left an absolutely enormous inheritance, which was valued at well over 5.5 million Danish rigsdaler, an amount difficult to convert to the present day, but at the time it was equivalent to approximately 10 times the annual government revenue of the Danish-Norwegian state, compared to the period 1620–1622. In 1775, historian Johann Heinrich Schlegel estimated that the liquid assets of her fortune in 1631, was equivalent to 27 tons of gold in 1775. Corrected for inflation, her combined fortune would thus be equivalent to several billion pounds.

The Dowager Queen had left no actual testament, but in a letter to her son King Christian, she had declared that her three living children should receive a sizeable pre-legacy, a non-distributable portion (Danish: forlods), the rest to be divided according to law, with the exception of a few bequests, including to Sorø Academy. The prelegacy consisted of all silverware in the Queen's chambers at Nykøbing Castle, all royal gold in her possession and her personal jewellery, clothes and linen, which were given to her daughters. The gold was divided equally between the king and his two sisters. This pre-distribution took place on 4 December 1631 at Nykøbing, a month after her funeral.

After the distribution of the prelegacy, the main estate itself was to be divided. The assets consisted of outstanding capital, interest, considerable cash, jewellery, coins and sizeable collateralized territories in Mecklenburg – her dowerlands of Lolland and Falster reverted to the Crown. Her jewellery and valuables alone are believed to be worth over a million rigsdaler, and were stored in 45 large wooden chests. Actively engaged in money lending to the end, a considerable part of Sophie's assets consisted of her outstanding capital. The largest borrower was her son, Christian IV, who in 1631 owed his mother more than a million Danish rigsdaler. In addition, other family members such as her grandsons, Frederick III, Duke of Holstein-Gottorp owed almost 600,000 rigsdaler, Frederick Ulrich, Duke of Brunswick-Lüneburg over 300,000 rigsdaler, and her cousins, John Albert II, Duke of Mecklenburg-Güstrow, and Adolphus Frederick I, Duke of Mecklenburg-Schwerin, each owed 220,000 rigsdaler and almost 140,000 rigsdaler, respectively. The city of Rostock itself also had an unpaid debt of 20,000 rigsdaler.

Furthermore, there was considerable interest to be recovered from her European lending business. In total, this amounted to well over 215,000 rigsdaler, including interest from Albrecht von Wallenstein, who owed the Queen 63,000 rigsdaler for his time as mortgage holder of the Duchy of Mecklenburg.

=== Claims and disputes ===
Upon Sophie's death, a dispute quickly arose over her inheritance. As news of Sophie's demise spread across Northern Europe, several German principalities began dispatching envoys to Copenhagen to negotiate and settle inheritance claims. By letter of 31 December 1631, Christian IV summoned all heirs for the division of the main estate, and scheduled this for the following April (in 1632) at Nykøbing Castle, Falster. Altogether, the inheritance settlement was completed by June 1632, although not without controversy.

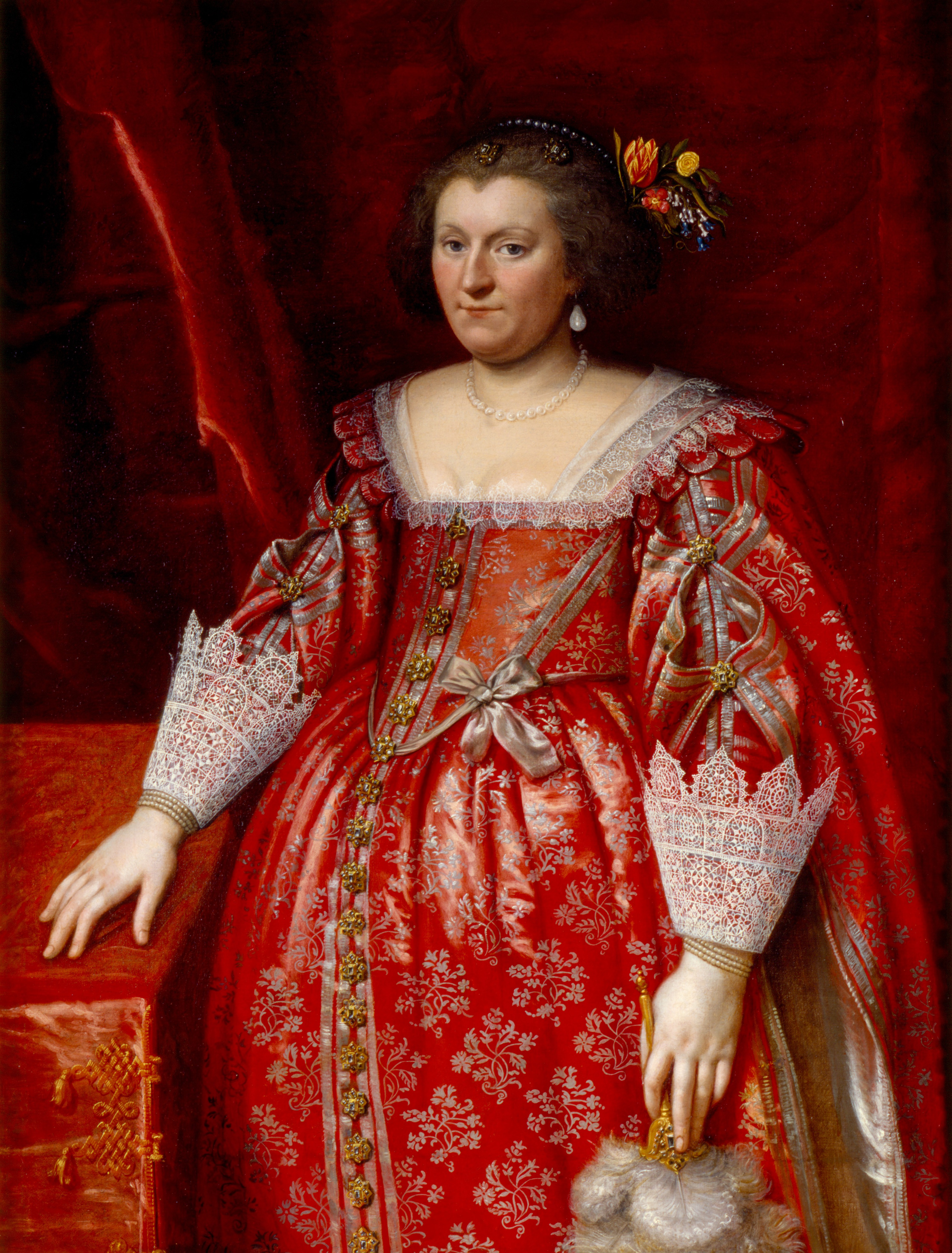
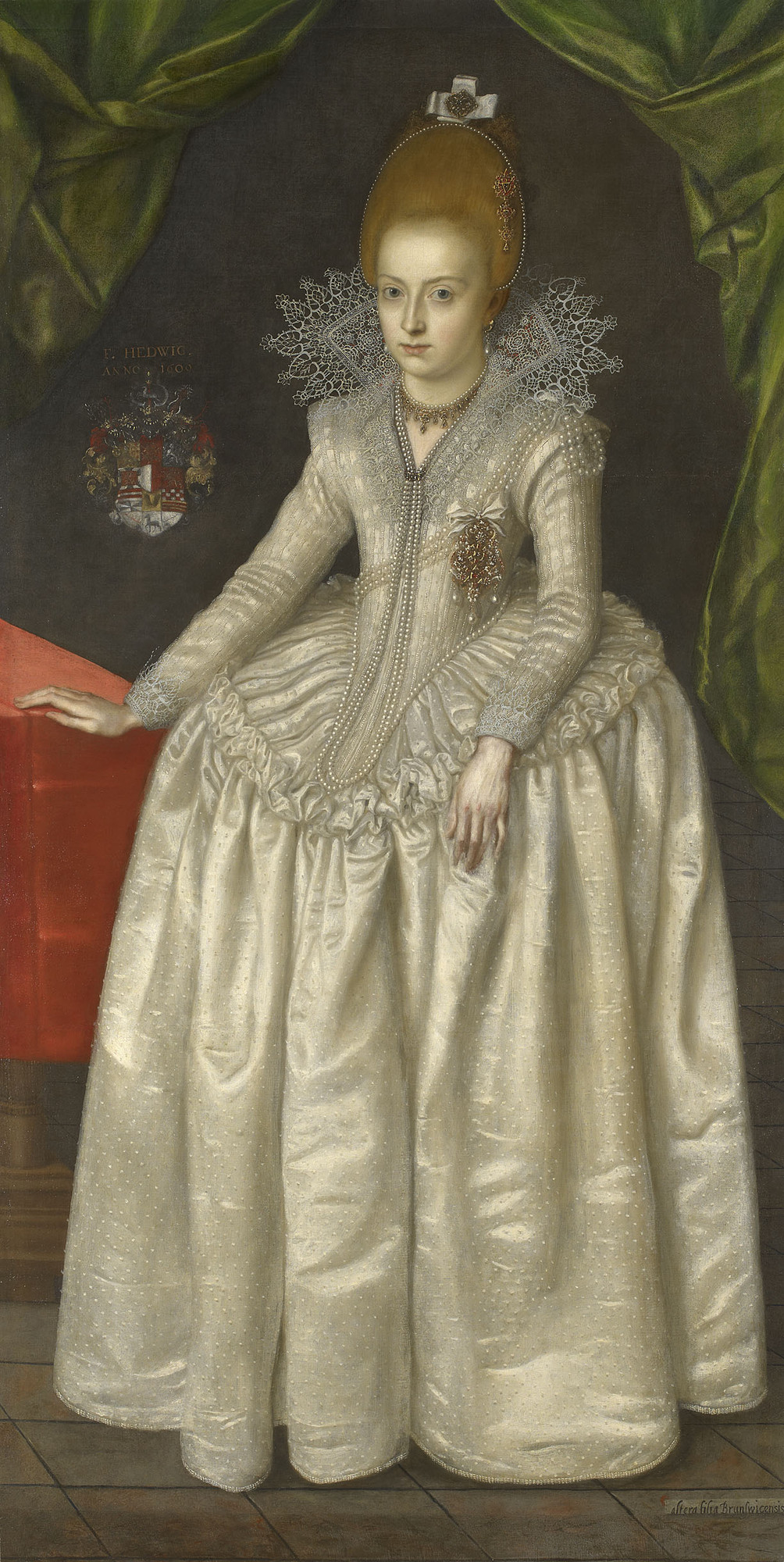
Sophie Hedwig of Brunswick-Wolfenbüttel (left) and Hedwig of Brunswick-Wolfenbüttel (right), granddaughters of Sophie, who made persistent, but ultimately unsuccessful, efforts to claim part of her vast inheritance.

Some initial disputes even required imperial intervention. During the process of recording all the valuables Sophie left behind, it became known that her daughter, Duchess Augusta, retained one of the two original handwritten inventories of the estate, from when she was handed the keys to Nykøbing Castle. Since amicable means of obtaining the inventory from the Duchess failed, an imperial mandate from Ferdinand II, was issued to her, dated 5 November 1635, in Vienna.

Discussions on the distribution of the estate primarily concerned the extent of inheritance rights for the grandchildren of Sophie, more specifically the offspring of Sophie's two predeceased daughters Anne and Elizabeth. Her grandson, Charles I of England, ordered the English court to enter into mourning, and immediately deployed an ambassador extraordinaire, Robert Sidney, 2nd Earl of Leicester, to the Danish court to offer condolences, and claim part of the inheritance. Sophie's granddaughter, Elizabeth Stuart, Queen of Bohemia, also sought a portion of the inheritance. Unlike her brother Charles, she had not inherited from her mother, Anne of Denmark, and therefore argued that she should receive part of her brother's inheritance from their late grandmother. Initially Charles was accepting of this, but after he found out the vast size of the inheritance, totalling over 430.000 rigsdaler, he changed his mind. However, Christian IV quickly appropriated most of their inheritance, claiming that what he had seized only served to pay part of the English debt from 1620.

During the spring of 1632, several representatives from Brunswick-Wolfenbüttel, Prussia, Holstein-Gottorp and Mecklenburg, began to arrive at the Danish Court to lodge inheritance demands on behalf of Elizabeth of Denmark's children. Ultimately, the majority of the principal heirs of the body were denied inheritance because they were simultaneously debtors of her estate. This included Charles I, the Dukes of Holstein-Gottorp, Brunswick-Lüneburg, Mecklenburg-Güstrow, and Mecklenburg-Schwerin, but with some exceptions, such as her daughter, Hedwig of Denmark, Electress of Saxony, who received the outstanding Mecklenburg assets, totalling over 360.000 rigsdaler. Most accepted this settlement, while others disputed it fiercely. In particular, Sophie Hedwig, Countess of Nassau-Dietz and Hedwig, Duchess of Pomerania made tenacious demands, and wistfully lamented that they were left empty-handed due to their brother, Frederick Ulrich's debt, from which they themselves had not benefited.

The disputes over inheritance persisted long after Sophie's passing. In 1654, over 20 years after her death, William Frederick, Prince of Nassau-Dietz, the son of the aforementioned Countess of Nassau-Diez and Count Ernest Casimir I, launched an appeal to recover his mother’s share of Queen Sophia's inheritance. A Danish envoy was dispatched from the court of Sophie's grandson, Frederick III, and a favourable settlement was negotiated between the Duke of Brunswick-Lüneburg and Nassau-Diez.

In the end, Christian IV emerged as the unsurpassed principal beneficiary of Sophie's disposable fortune, but he quickly squandered the inheritance on costly wars with Sweden, his eldest son's wedding and construction activities.

== Character and legacy ==
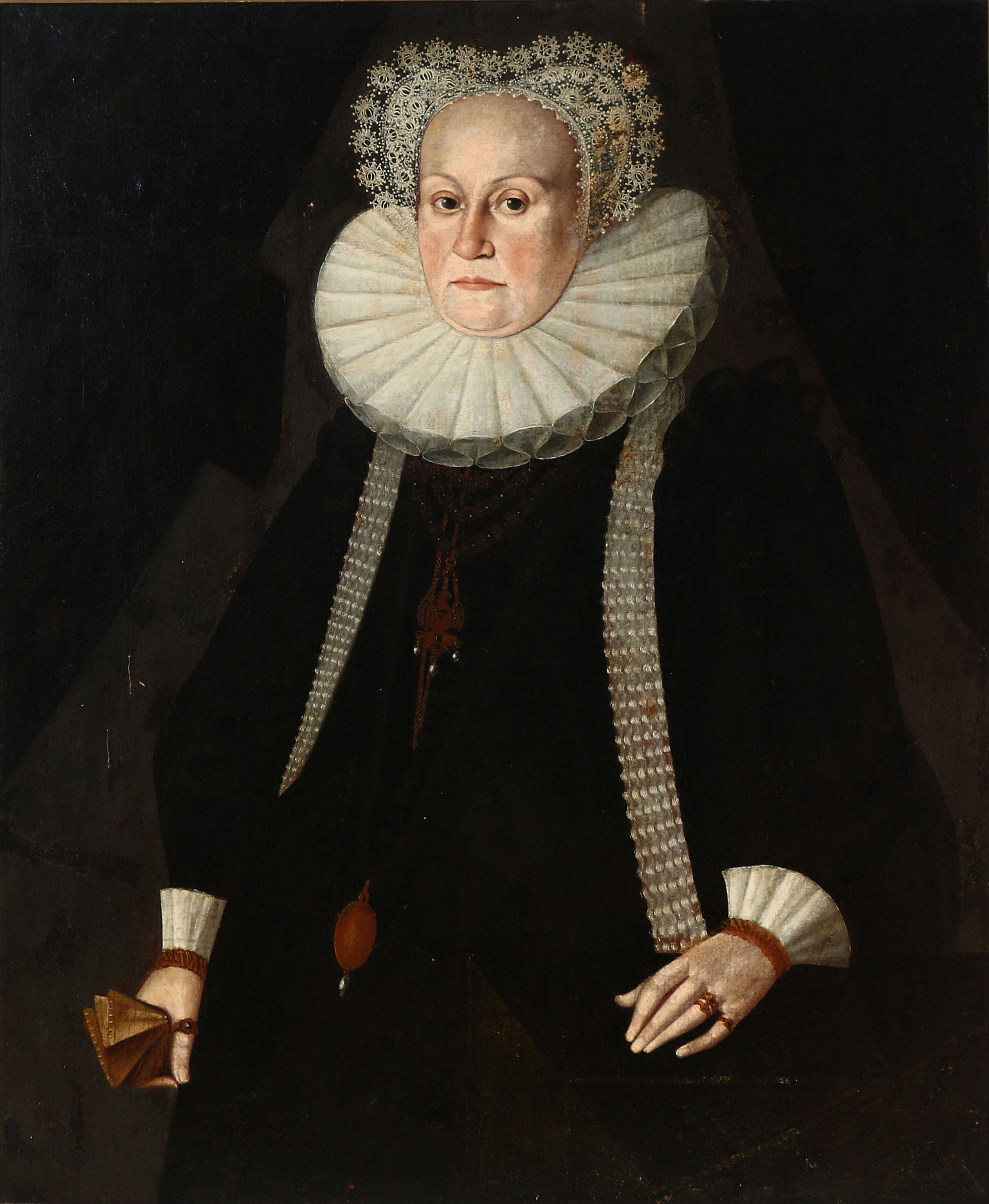
Sophie as queen dowager, by Dutch painter Jacob van Doordt.

Sophie of Mecklenburg was initially described as a "prudent and capable" woman, but reserved and uninterested in political power. However, this changed dramatically in her widowhood, when she became an assertive figure in conflicts with the Council of the Realm. This transformation earned her descriptions such as "a fury of a mother" and, later in life, a "confident old lady".

=== Contemporary and historical portrayal ===
Contemporary accounts of Sophie's character are divergent, though largely positive in nature, especially from foreign observers. The majority of the limited contemporaneous sources portray her positively. In 1588, Daniel Rodgers, an Anglo-Flemish diplomat employed for Lord Burghley, as a spy to report the characters of the Danish royal family, wrote of Queen Sophie; "She is a right virtous and godly princess, who with a motherly care and great wisdom, ruleth her children". When a canon of Lübeck, Hermann von Zesterfleth, visited Denmark in 1600, he noted that the dowager queen was able to extract large sums of revenue from her estate because of her highly efficient agricultural operations and management. When she died in 1631, observers described her as "a lady of great thrift and enterprise", and the secretary to the English Ambassador in Denmark, James Howell, remarked that she was the "richest Queen in Christendom".

However, domestic political power dynamics have resulted in a more negative perception of her character, which has left its mark on Danish history. Because of her significant wealth and consequent influence, and undoubtedly exacerbated by earlier disputes with the Council of the Realm about the maturity and regency of Christian IV, she was viewed by some contemporary Danish nobles as being cynical, greedy and avaricious. Later, predominantly male historians echoed these sentiments, dismissing Sophie as having an "economic sense that bordered on avarice," an "imperious character," and describing her as being in the grip of her emotions, with a bitter passion, a violent combativeness, and a fierce temperament. Other historians have treated Sophie superficially or somewhat perfunctorily in footnotes. Historian G.L. Baden, in his History of the Kingdom of Denmark, succinctly described Sophie as "talented".

Sophie's legacy has largely been overshadowed by the story of Frederick II's youthful love affair with the noblewoman Anne Hardenberg. The royal couple's relationship has even been portrayed as unhappy, including by the Danish author H.F. Ewald, who wrote a number of historical novels, including Anna Hardenberg (1880), which brought this flawed narrative into many Danish homes. Likewise, her claim to the role of guardian (and regent) has been judged negatively by earlier historians.

=== Modern characterization and reappraisals ===
Recent reevaluations of Sophie’s life present her in a much more nuanced light. She is now acknowledged as intelligent, industrious and strategic, and determined to consolidate her political influence in the Danish-Norwegian realm, after the Council of the Realm rejected her as guardian of her son in 1588 - something she successfully achieved through immense financial leverage.

She is chiefly remembered for her impressive financial acumen and as the eternal source of pecuniary support for her son Christian IV. She funded some of the greatest Renaissance constructions in Denmark, including Rundetårn, Børsen, and Rosenborg Castle, and also subsidized the rebuilding and expansion of Frederiksborg Castle as well as the restoration of Kronborg following the 1629 fire, that destroyed much of it. Although often described as avaricious, this view has since been firmly rejected. As early as 1910, Ellen Jørgensen and Johanne Skovgaard, in their work on Danish queens, emphasized that "Queen Sophie (...) can hardly justifiably be accused of having been mean or ungenerous. Her financial sense was of an active rather than a passive nature, and the significant profits were due to an enterprise that was abundant in initiative rather than in anxious frugality". She funded considerable charitable causes in her estate, notably the construction of hospitals and substantial grants to schools.

Danish historian Benito Scocozza describes her management of the dower estate as having a "firmness and ruthlessness that hardly made her popular on the islands (Lolland and Falster)", while other historians note that under her authority, "the dowerlands became her little principality, where she was dedicated to the welfare of her subjects and protected them from external enemies and local bailiffs". Sophie is now recognized as "arguably the most prominent landowner of the era". Upon the death of her husband, she "stepped forward authoritatively", and with "tremendous energy" she engaged in a "bitter struggle" to secure her children's economic and political future. Her ability to conduct "able politicking" even influenced her daughter Anne, Queen of Scotland and England, as noted in Nadine Akkermann's 2013 book on court cultures in the early Middle Ages. Literary historian John Leeds Barroll, also describes her as "a highly gifted woman".

Historian Sybil Jack has posited some motives for Sophie's endeavors during her widowhood: denied formal executive political power by the Danish nobility, Sophie became determined to seize economic power. And contrary to her previous undertakings, Sophie was absolutely successful in this regard.

=== Interests ===
Sophie was a fervent Lutheran Protestant. Raised by strongly Protestant parents, Sophie was particularly influenced by her attachment to orthodox lutheranism and her animosity towards the "calvinistic religion", which she considered to be the work of the devil. She and her husband were markedly anti-Catholic and supported the teachings of Niels Hemmingsen, but their primary focus was on ensuring religious stability and conformity in Denmark rather than engaging in detailed theological debate.

Sophie’s intellectual interests were diverse. She was highly erudite, with a particular affinity for books of a theological nature, but she also had a strong interest in folk culture and music. She occupies a very special place in history as the driving force behind Anders Sørensen's ‘Hundred Song Book’ (Danish: Hundredvisebogen) from 1591, Europe's first ever printed collection of traditional ballads.

In addition to her literary pursuits, Sophie was actively involved in extensive correspondence and gift exchanges, described as favoring "a certain magnanimity in gifts". She was referred to as a "splendid lady" who exchanged gifts with various German princely houses and even with the Emperor and the Imperial Court in Prague and Vienna.

== Issue ==
Sophie and Frederick had seven children:

Name	Portrait	Birth	Death	Notes
Elizabeth of Denmark		25 August 1573	19 June 1625	She married on 19 April 1590 Henry Julius, Duke of Brunswick-Lüneburg. They had 10 children.
Anne of Denmark		12 December 1574	2 March 1619	She married on 23 November 1589 King James VI of Scotland (later also King James I of England). They had 7 children.
Christian IV, King of Denmark and Norway		12 April 1577	28 February 1648	He married firstly on 27 November 1597 Anne Catherine of Brandenburg. They had 7 children. He married secondly, morganatically, Kirsten Munk. They had 12 children. Christian had at least 5 other illegitimate children.
Ulrik of Denmark		30 December 1578	27 March 1624	He became last Bishop of the old Schleswig see (1602–1624), He became Ulrich II as Administrator of the Prince-Bishopric of Schwerin (1603–1624). He married Lady Catherine Hahn-Hinrichshagen.
Augusta of Denmark		8 April 1580	5 February 1639	She married on 30 August 1596 John Adolf, Duke of Holstein-Gottorp. They had 8 children.
Hedwig of Denmark		5 August 1581	26 November 1641	She married on 12 September 1602 Christian II, Elector of Saxony. The marriage was childless
John of Denmark, Prince of Schleswig-Holstein		9 July 1583	28 October 1602	He was betrothed to Tsarevna Ksenia (Xenia) daughter of Boris Godunov, Tsar of Russia, but died before the marriage could take place.

== Ancestry ==
Ancestors of Sophie of Mecklenburg-Güstrow

8. Magnus II, Duke of Mecklenburg
4. Albrecht VII, Duke of Mecklenburg
9. Sophie of Pomerania
2. Ulrich III, Duke of Mecklenburg
10. Joachim I Nestor, Elector of Brandenburg
5. Anna of Brandenburg
11. Elizabeth of Denmark
1. Sophie of Mecklenburg-Güstrow
12. Christian I of Denmark
6. Frederick I of Denmark
13. Dorothea of Brandenburg
3. Elizabeth of Denmark
14. Bogislaw X, Duke of Pomerania
7. Sophie of Pomerania
15. Anna Jagiellon

Sophie of Mecklenburg-Güstrow House of Mecklenburg-Schwerin Cadet branch of the House of Mecklenburg Born: 4 September 1557 Died: 4 October 1631
Danish royalty
Preceded by Dorothea of Saxe-Lauenburg	Queen consort of Denmark and Norway; 1572–1588	Succeeded by Anne Catherine of Brandenburg
