= Beate Huitfeldt =

Danish noble (1554–1626)

- Born: 27 November 1554; Copenhagen, Denmark
- Occupations: Court official, landowner
- Known for: Noblewoman, Danish court official, and landowner
- Notable work: Building activities in Scania
- Title: Principal lady-in-waiting, Royal Governess
- Spouse: Knud Ebbesen Ulfeldt
- Parent: Christoffer Huitfeldt

Beate Huitfeldt (Copenhagen, 27 November 1554 – 1626), was a Danish noble and court official. She served as maid of honour to queen of Denmark Sophie of Mecklenburg-Güstrow in 1572–1574, as Principal lady-in-waiting to queen Anne Catherine of Brandenburg in 1597–1612, and royal governess of the household of the royal princes in 1612–1617. She is known for her activity as a builder in Scania.

She was the daughter of nobleman Christoffer Huitfeldt (1501–1559) and married Knud Ebbesen Ulfeldt of Svenstorp Castle in Scania (d. 1586). She was granted the Möllerup Castle in Scania for her court service.
