= Svenstorp Castle =

Castle in Lund Municipality, Sweden

- Svenstorps slott
- Lund Municipality
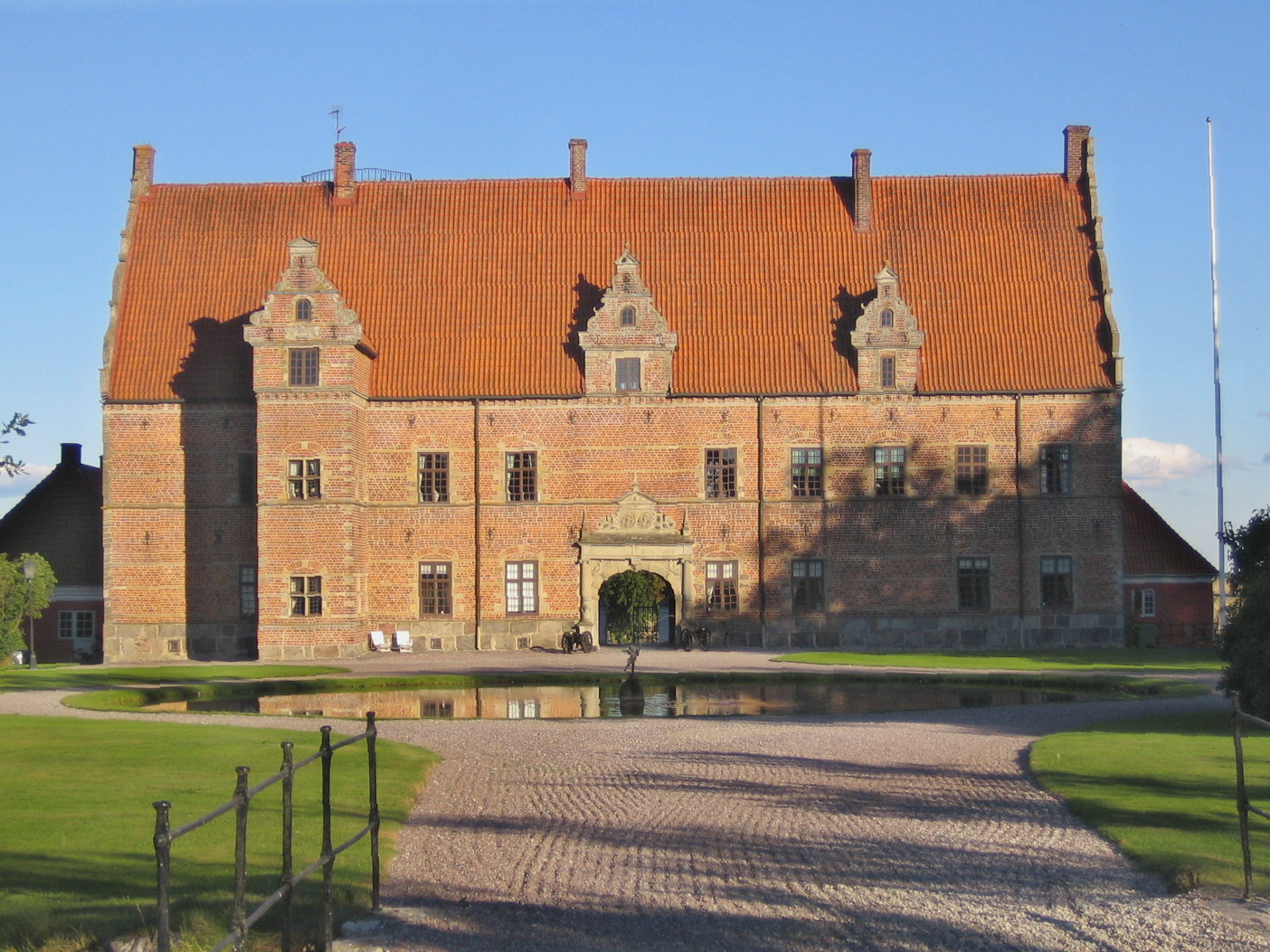
- Svenstorp Castle

Site information
- Type: Castle
- Open to the public: No

Location
- Scania, Sweden
- Coordinates: 55.7657°N 13.2553°E

Site history
- Built: 1596

Svenstorp Castle (Swedish: Svenstorps slott) is a castle in Lund Municipality, Scania, in southern Sweden. It was built in 1596 by Beate Huitfeldt, a powerful lady-in-waiting to the Danish King Christian IV. Her architect was Hans Steenwinkel.

In November 1676, the Danish king, Christian V, stayed at Svenstorp before the Battle of Lund. The night after the battle the Swedish king, Charles XI, whose troops had won the battle, stayed in the same room and the same bed.

Since 1723, the castle has been owned by the Gyllenkrok family. Today, Nils and Merrill Gyllenkrok and their family live at Svenstorp Castle.
