= Nykøbing Castle =

Castle in Nykøbing Falster, Denmark

Coordinates: 54°46′18″N 11°51′56″E

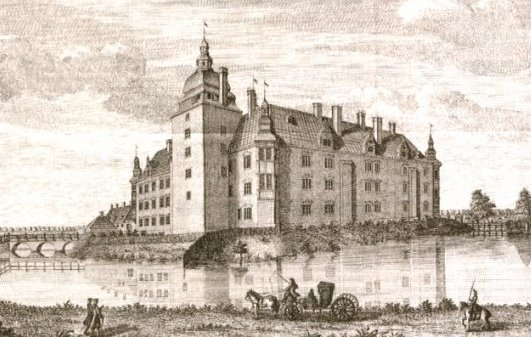
The second Nykøbing Castle, completed 1594

Nykøbing Castle (Danish: Nykøbing Slot), now demolished, was located on today's Slotsbryggen in Nykøbing Falster, Denmark. Completed in 1594 in the Renaissance style, it replaced an earlier building from the 12th century. A royal palace, it was the traditional residence of Denmark's queen dowagers including Margrethe Sambiria (1230?–1282) and Queen Sophie (1557–1631). Christopher II died in the castle in 1332.

== History ==
The need for a castle and the protection it offered was due to the turbulent conditions that existed in the Baltic Sea. The earliest version of the castle is believed to be in the second half of the 12th century. In 1253, it was occupied by the Lübeckers, who also burned Nykøbing. From 1264 until 1282, Christopher I's widow, Margrethe Sambiria, a lively personality and an excellent rider, lived there. In 1289, Stig Andersen Hvide and his men stormed the structure. In 1320, it was taken by Christopher II, who 12 years later was captured and imprisoned in the castle where he died 1332.

The castle was repeatedly the setting for political meetings. One occurred in 1365, marking peace between Valdemar IV and the Hanseatic League; another occurred in 1399, when Queen Margrethe and the Hanseatic League agreed on a joint action against the Victual Brothers; and yet another in 1507 when "the Nykøbing Recess" ended a dispute between King Hans and the Hanseatic towns. As the area around the castle offered good opportunities for hunting, various kings often stayed there. It was also used as a residence for dowager queens including Dorothea of Brandenburg, the widow of Christian I.

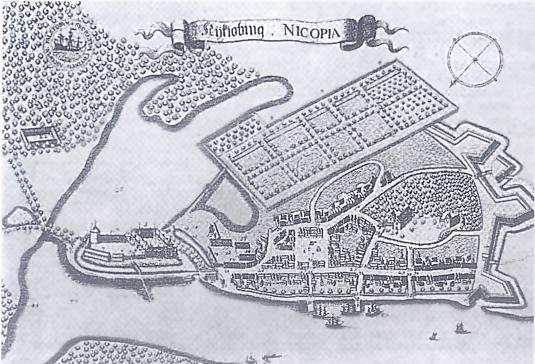
Map of Nykøbing from Resen's Atlas Danicus (1670) showing the castle surrounded by water on three sides

The medieval castle gradually deteriorated. King Frederik II and his wife Queen Sophie saw the need for a new building. In 1587, on the recommendation of Sophie's parents, the Dutch architect Philip Brandin arrived in Nykøbing where he designed a new castle in the Renaissance style. After the king unexpectedly died the following year, it was his young widow who took charge of construction, the crown estates of Lolland and Falster providing her pension.

Sophie resided in it until her death in 1631. The castle was next used by her grandson, Prince Christian and his wife Magdalene Sibylle. Christian held many parties with music and dance, laid out a large garden with exotic plants and bulbs, and extended the stables to accommodate his many and varied horses. From 1642 to 1645, he improved the town's fortifications with ramparts, moats and bastions.

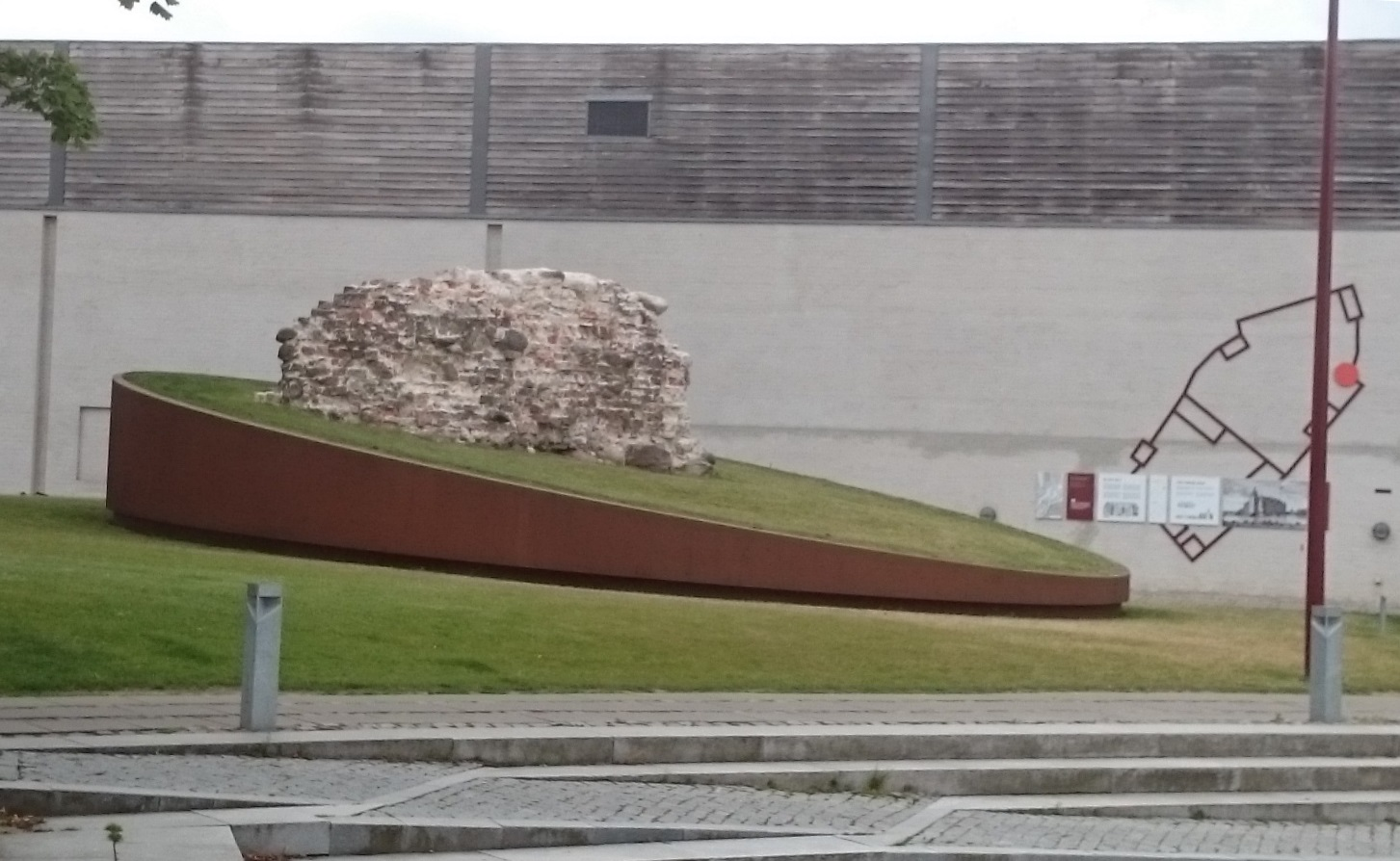
The ruins of present-day in Nykøbing Falster.

After Christian's death in 1647, the castle was only used for limited periods when other Danish queen dowagers resided there. It eventually fell into disrepair, and it was decided in 1766 to sell the building and its fittings. The following year, the castle was sold at auction and demolished. The bricks were used to build numerous estates and rectories in different parts of Falster. All that remains of the castle is a stump of wall from the Medieval prison tower known as Fars Hat (Father's Hat).

== Architecture ==
The red brick building with sandstone trimmings and the usual decorations of the day was completed in 1594. Its four connected wings were each three-storeys high. In the west wing, there was a tall, almost quadrangular tower with a spire. The four outer corners had rectangular bays, also with spires. The entrance to the courtyard was through a gate in the north wing. In the four corners of the courtyard, there were spire-topped towers with steps to the upper floors.
