= Augusta of Denmark =

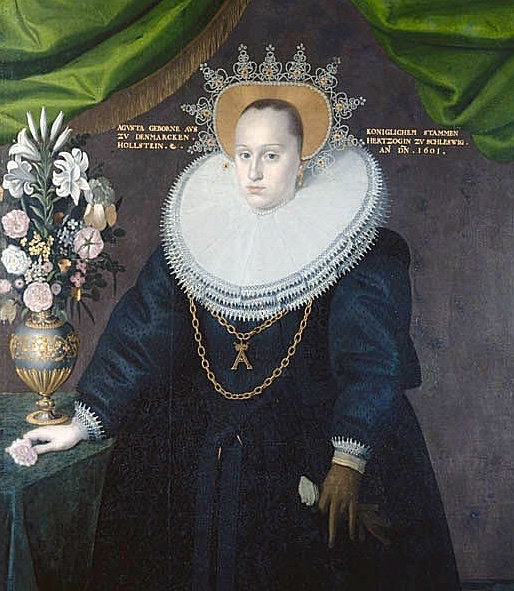
- Portrait of Augusta c. 1601

Duchess consort of Holstein-Gottorp
- Tenure: 30 August 1596 - 31 March 1616
- Born: 8 April 1580; Koldinghus
- Died: 5 February 1639 (aged 58); Husum Castle
- Spouse: John Adolf, Duke of Holstein-Gottorp
- Issue: Frederick III, Duke of Holstein-Gottorp; Elisabeth Sofie; Adolf; Dorothea Augusta of Schleswig-Holstein-Gottorp; Hedwig; Anna; John X of Schleswig-Holstein-Gottorp; Christian
- House: Oldenburg
- Father: Frederick II of Denmark
- Mother: Sophia of Mecklenburg-Güstrow

Princess Augusta of Denmark (8 April 1580 – 5 February 1639) was the Duchess of Holstein-Gottorp as the wife of Duke John Adolf. She was the third daughter of King Frederick II of Denmark and Sophia of Mecklenburg-Güstrow. She was politically influential during the reign of her son, Duke Frederick III.

== Life ==
In August 1594 there were negotiations for Augusta to marry Maurice, Prince of Orange, involving her sister the Queen of Scotland, but the plan was abandoned.

Earlier in Augusta's life, another match for her had been considered. Between 1589 and 1590 there had been plans for a marriage between Princess Augusta and William IV, Landgrave of Hesse-Kassel's eldest son Maurice. It was Duke Adolf of Gottorp's widow, Duchess Christine, Landgrave William's sister, who was particularly interested in this party. The Gottorp councillor Casper Hoyer, stable master in Eiderstedt, was sent to Danish Chancellor Niels Kaas repeatedly to negotiate with him on the matter. Both Niels Kaas and Dowager Queen Sophie also stood up rather favourably for the match, but the negotiations still do not seem to have gone beyond the first initial steps.

=== Duchess consort of Holstein-Gottorp ===
She was married on 30 August 1596 in Copenhagen to her parents' cousin Duke John Adolf of Holstein-Gottorp (1575–1616) and had eight children. The marriage was tense as the spouses disagreed on religious matters. When in 1610 John Adolf fired the Lutheran vicar Jacob Fabricius the Elder, general provost for Holstein and Schleswig ducal share, and replaced him with a Calvinist, Philipp Caesar, as the official vicar of the ducal court in 1614, Augusta refused to attend service and went by foot to the Lutheran church in Schleswig.

In September 1603 she sent one of her ladies-in-waiting to the court of her sister Anne of Denmark to learn English manners and customs. The lady met Arbella Stuart and Henry Wotton and visited Basing House, Woodstock Palace, and Oxford.

=== Widowhood ===
As widow, she fired the Calvinist court vicar and reinstated Jacob Fabricius in 1616. She was politically influential during the reign of her son. She governed Husum castle as her dowry and there promoted arts and culture, music and gardening and schools. She supported and recommended the persecuted writer Anna Ovena Hoyer, when she fled from Holstein-Gottorp to the Swedish queen, Maria Eleonora of Brandenburg in 1632. In 1631 she came in conflict with her ruling brother Christian IV of Denmark over the inheritance of their wealthy mother.

== Issue ==
Her marriage to John Adolf produced eight children, four sons and four daughters. Her last child, a son, did not survive infancy.

1. Frederick III of Holstein-Gottorp (22 December 1597 – 10 August 1659).
2. Elisabeth Sofie (12 October 1599 – 25 November 1627), married on 5 March 1621 to Duke Augustus of Saxe-Lauenburg.
3. Adolf (15 September 1600 – 19 September 1631).
4. Dorothea Augusta of Schleswig-Holstein-Gottorp (12 May 1602 – 13 March 1682), married in 1633 to Joachim Ernest, Duke of Schleswig-Holstein-Sonderburg-Plön, son of John II, Duke of Schleswig-Holstein-Sonderburg.
5. Hedwig (23 December 1603 – 22 March 1657), married on 15 July 1620 to Augustus, Count Palatine of Sulzbach.
6. Anna (19 December 1604 – 20 March 1623).
7. John (18 March 1606 – 21 February 1655).
8. Christian (born and died 1 December 1609).

== Ancestry ==
Ancestors of Augusta of Denmark

16. Christian I of Denmark (=28)
8. Frederick I of Denmark (=14)
17. Dorothea of Brandenburg (=29)
4. Christian III of Denmark
18. John Cicero, Elector of Brandenburg
9. Anna of Brandenburg
19. Margaret of Thuringia
2. Frederick II of Denmark
20. John V, Duke of Saxe-Lauenburg
10. Magnus I, Duke of Saxe-Lauenburg
21. Dorothea of Brandenburg
5. Dorothea of Saxe-Lauenburg
22. Henry IV, Duke of Brunswick-Lüneburg
11. Catherine of Brunswick
23. Catherine of Pomerania-Wolgast
1. Augusta of Denmark
24. Magnus II, Duke of Mecklenburg
12. Albrecht VII, Duke of Mecklenburg
25. Sophie of Pomerania-Wolgast
6. Ulrich, Duke of Mecklenburg
26. Joachim I Nestor, Elector of Brandenburg
13. Anna of Brandenburg
27. Elizabeth of Denmark
3. Sophie of Mecklenburg-Güstrow
28. Christian I of Denmark (=16)
14. Frederick I of Denmark (=8)
29. Dorothea of Brandenburg (=17)
7. Elizabeth of Denmark
30. Bogislaw X, Duke of Pomerania
15. Sophie of Pomerania
31. Anna of Poland

Augusta of Denmark House of Oldenburg Born: 8 April 1580 Died: 5 February 1639
Royal titles
Preceded by Christine of Hesse	Duchess consort of Holstein-Gottorp; 1596-1616	Succeeded by Marie Elisabeth of Saxony
