= Anne Lykke =

Danish noblewoman and royal mistress

- Born: Anne Henriksdatter Lykke; 30 April 1595; Vordingborg Castle
- Died: 1641 (aged 45–46)
- Spouses: Cai Rantzau (m. 1615; died 1623) Knud Ulfeldt (m. 1629)
- Partner: Christian, Prince-Elect of Denmark
- Children: Sophie Rantzau
- Parents: Henrik Lykke (father); Karen Frandsdatter Banner (mother)

Anne Lykke (30 April 1595 – 1641) was a Danish noblewoman and royal mistress of Christian, Prince Elect of Denmark.

== Early life ==
Anne Henriksdatter Lykke was born into one of Denmark's more prosperous noble families. She was the daughter of the noble statesman Henrik Lykke (1555–1611) and Karen Frandsdatter Banner (1559–1616). She was born at Vordingborg Castle, where her father was sheriff. During 1615, Anne married nobleman Cai Rantzau (1591–1623), governor of several royal palaces. In 1616, her only child, daughter Sophie, (1616–1635) was born at Copenhagen Castle where Rantzau was sheriff. In 1621, Rantzau was appointed General Commissioner of war for Danish troops in Holstein. He died in 1623, when Anne was 27 years of age. Following his death, Anne took over the administration of the tenancies until the accounts had been settled.

== Relation with Prince Christian ==
During May 1625, King Christian IV of Denmark embarked on a military campaign which was later known in Denmark and Norway as The Emperor War (Kejserkrigen). With King Christian commanding on the battlefield, Prince Christian was installed as acting head of government. During 1626, Anne was arrested by order of King Christian, who thought the influence she had on his son made his son incapable of ruling while the king was abroad. Anne abducted in Nyborg, arrested and sent to the Bohus Fortress. The arrest caused a conflict between the monarch and the noble council of state since it was a clear breach of the law to imprison a noble without trial. She refused to accept the king's initial terms for her release. The king accused her of having hired a witch, Lamme Heine, to harm him. He planned to have her put on trial for sorcery. During the summer of 1627, the trial was prevented because of the German invasion. Both Johann Tserclaes, Count of Tilly and Albrecht von Wallenstein had occupied the duchies and the whole peninsula of Jutland. There was also opposition and intervention of powerful people in Denmark, including the king's own mother, Queen Dowager Sophie. In 1628, Anne was released with the condition that she accept house arrest on her estate.

== Later life ==
In 1629, Anne married the wealthy nobleman Knud Ulfeldt (1600–1646), the son of Chancellor of the Realm Jacob Ulfeldt. Knud Ulfeldt lost his position of marshal of the court and only after Anne's death in 1641 did he return as Lord Chamberlain.
