= Anders Sørensen Vedel =

Danish priest and historian (1542–1616)

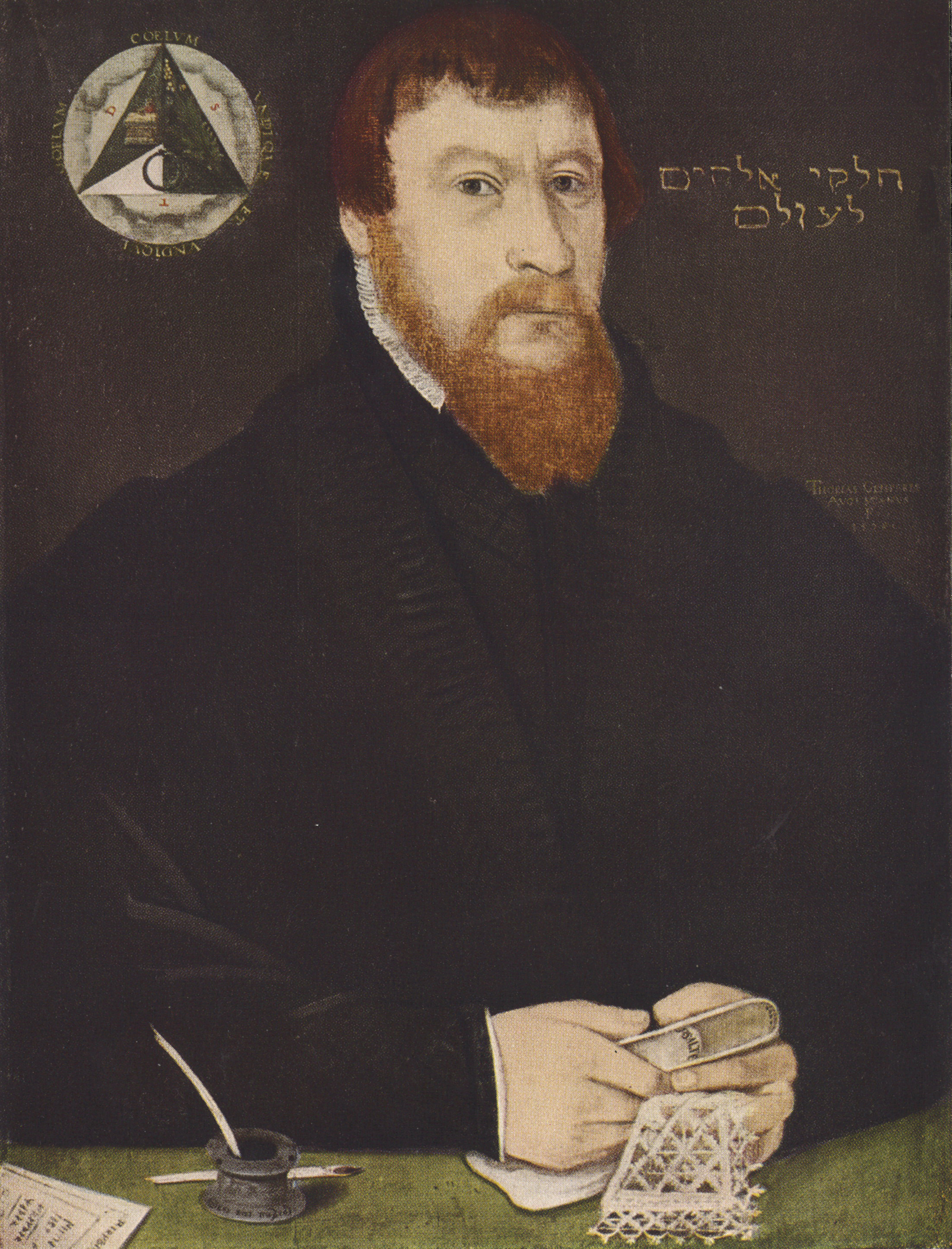
Anders Sørensen Vedel

Anders Sørensen Vedel (9 November 1542 – 13 February 1616) was a Danish priest and historian. He translated the Gesta Danorum by Saxo Grammaticus into Danish in 1575, and published the influential "Hundredvisebogen" in 1591.

== Biography ==
Anders Sørensen was born in Vejle, from which place the Vedel name comes. At 14 years old, he moved to study in Ribe, and after finishing his education he moved on to Copenhagen University in 1561. In 1562, he was the tutor of astronomer Tycho Brahe on Brahe's Grand Tour in Europe, forming a lasting bond of friendship with him. Vedel started studying at Wittenberg in 1565, which he finished in 1566, and was appointed priest at Copenhagen Castle in 1568. Vedel's historical knowledge was admired by leading politicians including Christoffer Valkendorf, Bjørn Andersen, Arild Huitfeldt, Johan Friis and Peder Oxe, and he was seen as the right man to continue Christiern Pedersen's Danish language translation of the Latin chronicle Gesta Danorum by Saxo Grammaticus.

He started his translation in 1570, and the finished work "Den danske Krønicke" was published in 1575. The work was both a translation and rewriting of the original Latin phrases. While working on the translation, he was given the income of a canon at Ribe Cathedral in 1573. After pressure from Peder Oxe, Niels Kaas, and Jørgen Rosenkrantz, Vedel wrote a proposal for a Latin continuation of Saxo's work in 1578 which was finalized in 1581. He was relieved of his priesthood in Copenhagen, and moved to Ribe in 1581.

He was appointed Royal historian in 1584 and received a prelature at Ribe to support himself, and undertook the task of continuing the Danish chronicle in that year. However, he overreached himself in his attempt to do so. He planned an ambitious work in twenty-two books dealing with both language and topography as well as with history. However other tasks, lack of help from secretaries, his own slowness and carefulness—and perhaps also a general underestimation of the demands of this work—led to very modest results. In 1594, after the death of chancellor Niels Kaas, the task was given to Niels Krag, under Vedel's protestations. He got a one-year reprieve, but could not produce satisfactory results, after which he turned his work over to Niels Krag. Much of what he had written was lost at the fire of Copenhagen in 1728.

One spin-off from this task which survived was his "Hundredvisebogen" (1591) of a hundred Danish ballads which became a solid foundation of later knowledge of the older Danish literary tradition. It was published with the support of Queen Sophie (it has been suggested that as a result, Vedel opted to omit certain ballads which portrayed a Queen Sophie – ostensibly Sophia of Minsk – in a negative light). Vedel's one hundred songs were republished by Peder Syv in 1695, as half of his collection of 200 folksongs. Vedel's own re-creation of some of the ballads shows his ability as a poet. In the Faroe Islands, texts from "Hundredvisebogen" have been in use among folk singers right up until today.

Vedel died on 13 February 1616 in Ribe.

== Bibliography ==
- Pavekrønike, 1571.
- Den danske Krønicke, 1575
- Hundredvisebog, 1591. ISBN 87-7421-740-2 (facsimile)
