= John X of Schleswig-Holstein-Gottorp =

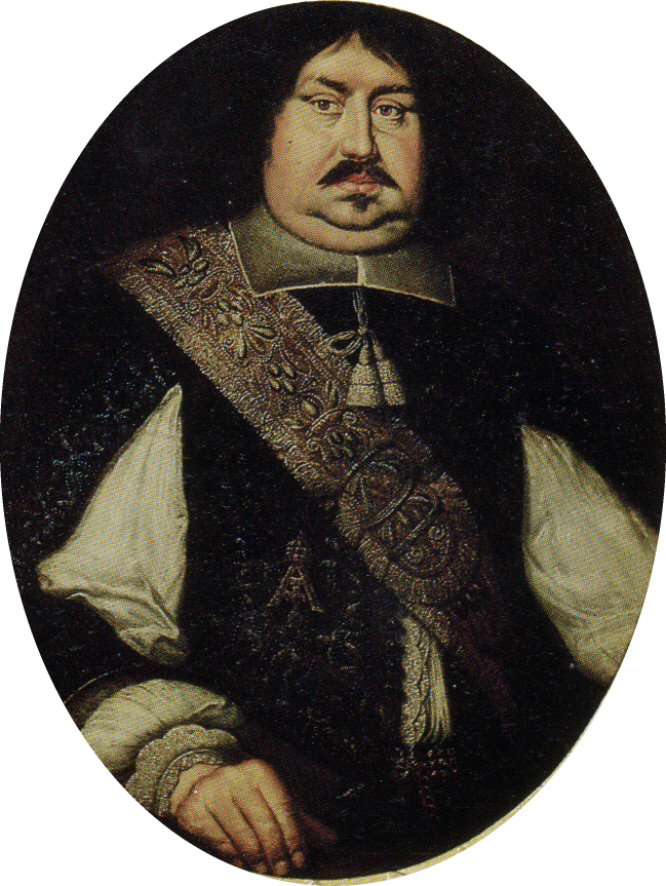
- Anonymous portrait (17th century)
- Born: 18 March 1606; Gottorf Castle
- Died: 21 February 1655 (aged 48); Eutin
- Noble family: House of Oldenburg
- Spouse: Julia Felicitas of Württemberg-Weiltingen
- Father: John Adolf, Duke of Holstein-Gottorp
- Mother: Augusta of Denmark

John of Schleswig-Holstein-Gottorp, nicknamed Bishop Hans called Hans Bishop, (18 March 1606 at Gottorf Castle – 21 February 1655 in Eutin), was a Lutheran Administrator of Prince-Bishopric of Lübeck.

John was the son of the Duke John Adolph of Schleswig-Holstein-Gottorp and the nephew of the previous Administrator John Frederick, whom he succeeded in 1634.

John was the first Administrator of Lübeck to take permanent residence at Eutin Castle, which he kept expanding. He tried to draw scholars and scientists to his court and to promote the economic development of the prince-bishopric, but his efforts were hampered by the outbreak of the plague in the years 1638 and 1639, while at the same time the Thirty Years' War imposed additional burdens on the country. Thus Danish troops were quartered in the capital Eutin both in 1638/1639 and in 1643, and in December 1643 a whole Swedish cavalry regiment was quartered in Eutin. The Prince-Bishopric had to house and feed this regiment.

During the negotiations in Osnabrück that led to the Peace of Westphalia, the existence of his Prince-Bishopric was at risk: the possibility existed that his land would be given to some other state as territorial compensation for an earlier annexation. John managed to avert this danger by carefully selecting his negotiators; first David Gloxin from Lübeck, then his councillor Christian Cassius.

== Marriage and issue ==
John married on 7 May 1640 to Princess Julia Felicitas (1619-1661), a daughter of Duke Julius Frederick of Württemberg-Weiltingen. The marriage was an extremely unhappy one. John tried to divorce in 1648 and finally succeeded in 1653. The couple had four children:

- Julius Adolph Frederick (2 October 1643 – 3 January 1644)
- John Julius Frederick (17 February 1646 – 22 May 1647)
- John Augustus (3 August 1647 – 29 January 1686)
- Christine Auguste Sabine (4 June 1642 – 20 May 1650)

John X of Schleswig-Holstein-Gottorp House of Schleswig-Holstein-Gottorp Cadet branch of the House of Oldenburg Born: 18 March 1606 Died: 21 February 1655
Regnal titles
Preceded by John Frederick	Administrator of the Lübeck Prince-Bishopric; 1634-1655	Succeeded by Christian Albert
