= Christian, Prince-Elect of Denmark =

Heir apparent to Christian IV (1603–1647)

Christian
- Prince Elect of Denmark; Crown Prince of Norway
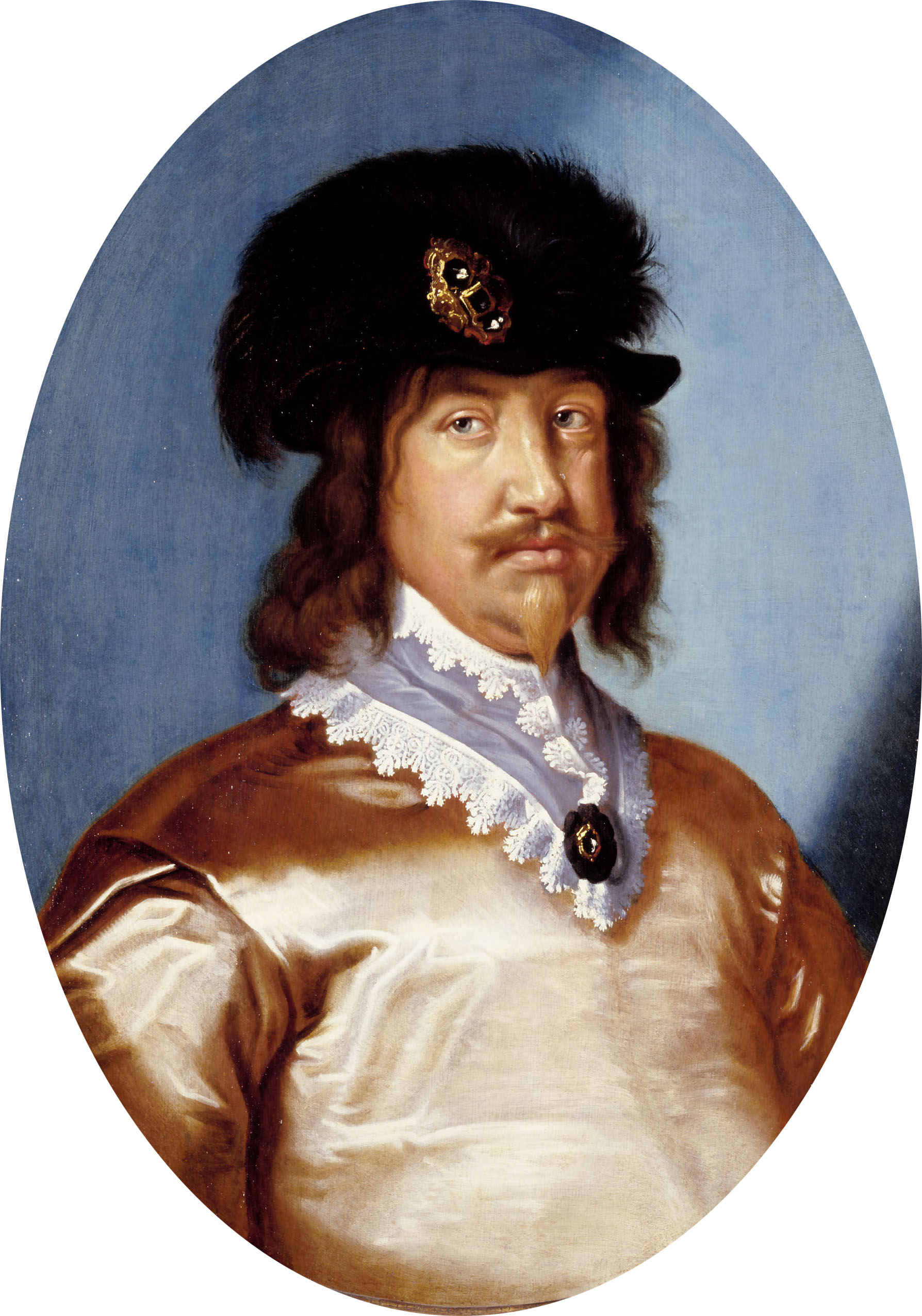
- Portrait by Karel van Mander III, 1642
- Born: 10 April 1603; Copenhagen Castle
- Died: 2 June 1647 (aged 44); Gorbitz Castle
- Burial: 8 November 1647; Church of Our Lady, Copenhagen; 1655; Roskilde Cathedral
- Spouse: Magdalene Sibylle of Saxony (m. 1634)
- House: Oldenburg
- Father: Christian IV of Denmark
- Mother: Anne Catherine of Brandenburg
- Religion: Lutheranism

Christian (10 April 1603 – 2 June 1647) was prince-elect of Denmark from 1610 and heir apparent to the throne of Norway from 1603. Because he died before his father, King Christian IV, the throne passed instead to his brother, King Frederick III.

== Biography ==
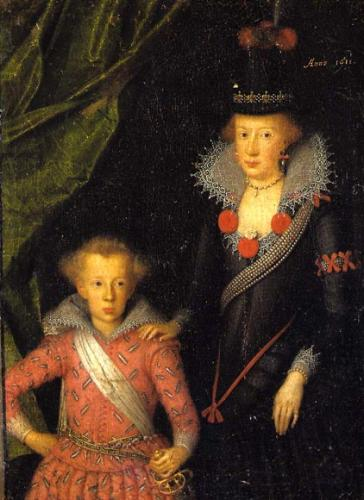
The Crown Prince of Norway and his mother, Queen Anne Catherine.

=== Early life ===
Prince Christian was born at Copenhagen Castle to King Christian IV (1577–1648) and Queen Anne Catherine (1575–1612) of Denmark, Norway, etc. Christian was their second son and the oldest one living, as his elder brother Frederik had died in 1599, less than a year old. As such, his father saw him as the preferable heir to the Danish throne.

Denmark was an elective monarchy, where elective power was held by the Council of the Realm. However, the king would usually choose an heir and have him hailed as such, thus limiting the Council's freedom of choice. Whilst Norway was formally a hereditary monarchy, making Christian heir apparent since his birth, it remained likely that the next king of Denmark would not have been another person than the next king of Norway. In 1608, the Council and representatives of the Estates supported the king in naming Christian as heir apparent. He was publicly hailed in 1610, both in Denmark and Norway.

Titled Tugtmester, Niels Jørgensen Æryleus (1610–1617) and Jesper Brochmand (1617–1620) were responsible for educating the prince. Leading the principal court, Christian Friis til Kragerup was Hofmester (1615–1616), succeeded by Christian Thomesen Sehested in 1616.

=== Career and marriage ===
In 1625, Denmark-Norway ventured into the Thirty Years' War. The Danish Intervention saw the war entering its second main phase, after the end of the Bohemian Revolt. With King Christian IV commanding on the battlefield, Prince Christian was installed as acting head of government. Christian held this post to 1627, but not without entering the battlefield in the meantime. He was even hit by two gunshots in November 1626. In 1627 he was sent to Holstein near the frontier, where he took seat in Segeberg. He later retreated to Norway when enemy troops overran Jutland, as the Danish Intervention failed. During this process he even broke a leg after a fall from a wagon. In 1626, his relationship with the noble Anne Lykke caused a conflict with his father and the Council of the Realm when his father arrested Lykke because of her influence on him and tried to have her charged with sorcery.

In 1628, Christian received the fief of Malmøhus. In January 1632, he was appointed Governor-General of the Danish parts of Schleswig and Holstein. He also received Laaland and Falster.

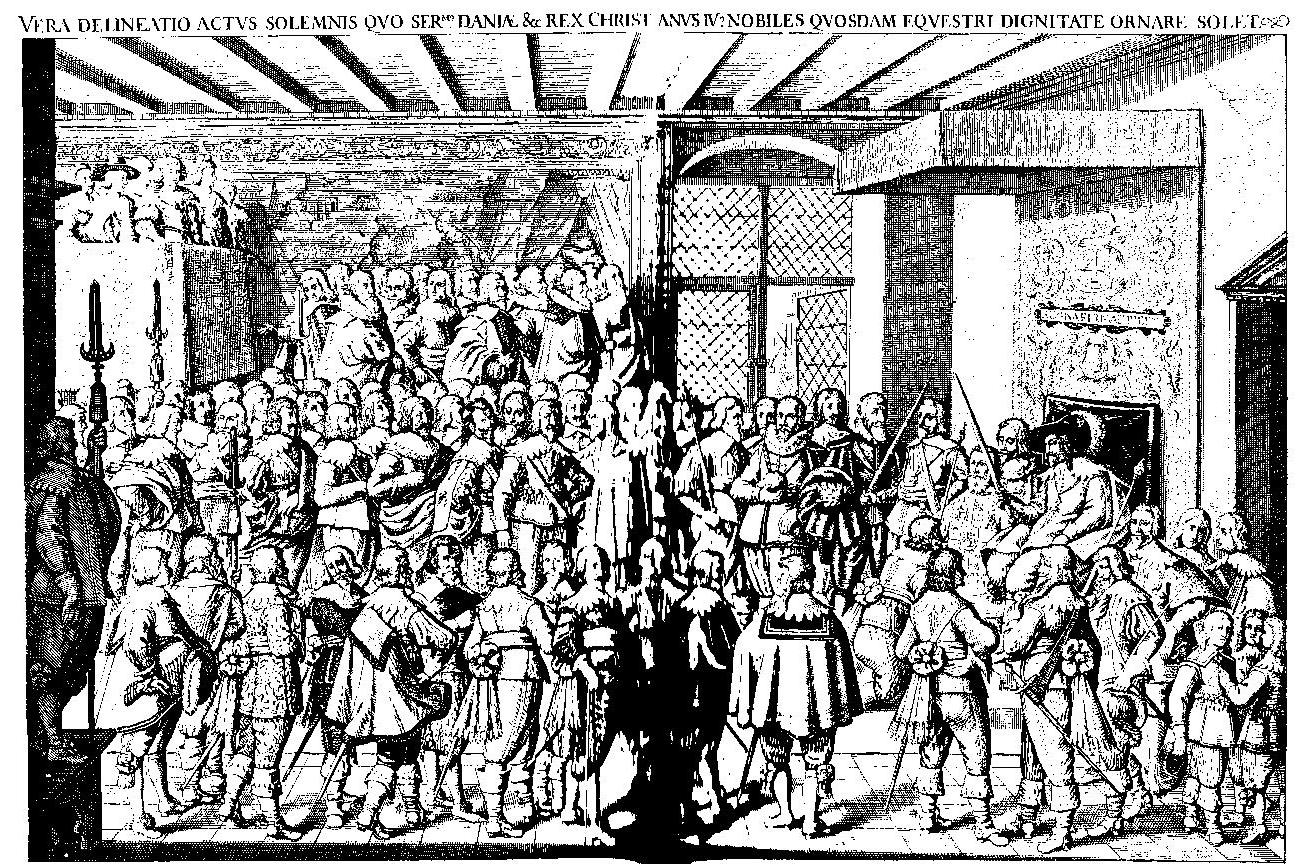
The wedding in 1634.

In 1633, Christian was engaged to Magdalene Sibylle, daughter of Elector John George I of Saxony; the marriage had been discussed as early as 1630. The wedding took place on 5 October 1634 in Copenhagen among great festivities. The marriage was childless, and they resided at Nykøbing Castle in Falster. Christian was not much involved on the political scene in this phase of his life, partly to his own dismay, but he did act as head of government in 1644, when the King was absent due to the Torstenson War. In the autumn of 1644, Prince Christian had a stay in the fortified Malmø, but Swedish forces threatened the city, and Christian retreated, first to Copenhagen due to illness, then to Falster.

=== Later life and legacy ===
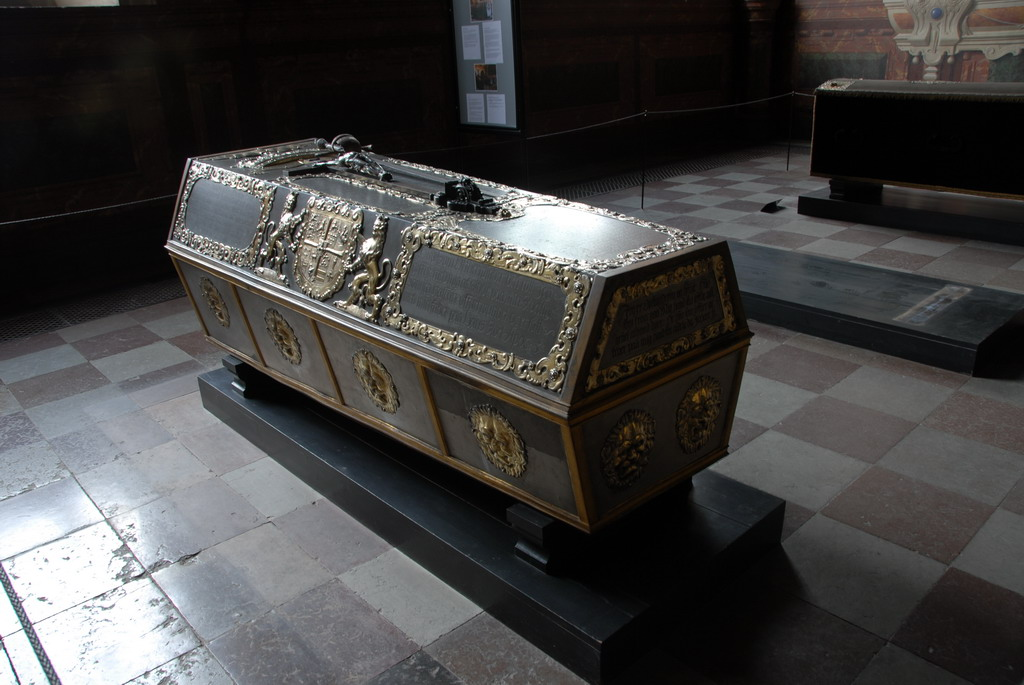
Prince Christian's sarchophagus.

Christian gained a reputation as lazy and as a drinker. He was heavily indebted; despite his father's attempts to pay some of Christian's debts, he still owed more than 215,000 rigsdaler in 1647. Among others, he took a loan from the Duke of Gottorp in 1646 in order to finance a stay in a Bohemian spa. He left Nykøbing for Bohemia on 8 May 1647. He reached Dresden on 28 May, and continued on 1 June. Not long after leaving he was struck by a fit of illness. He was brought to a castle in Gorbitz near Dresden, where he died on the next day. He was buried on 8 November 1647 in the Church of Our Lady in Copenhagen. In 1655, his remains were moved to the tombs at Roskilde Cathedral.
