= Jacob van Doordt =

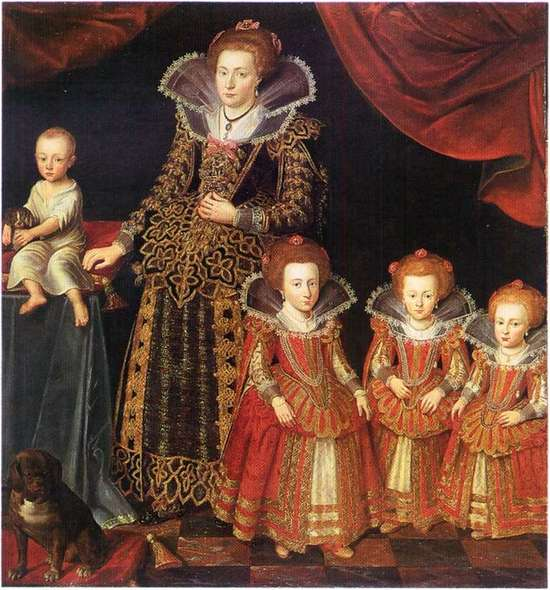
Kirsten Munk, 1623

Jacob van Doort (-1629) was a painter of Flemish or Dutch extraction active in portrait miniatures from 1606 to his death in 1629. He did much of his work for the courts of Denmark and Sweden, in particular the court of Christian IV of Denmark.

His own life is not well known. He was possibly the son of Peter van der Doort of Antwerp and the brother of Abraham van Doordt. He may have been born in Hamburg and made a few trips to England. For most of his career he worked in Northern Europe. He died in Stockholm.
