= Frederick Williams =

Frederick Williams may refer to:

== Politicians ==
- Sir Frederick Williams, 2nd Baronet, of Tregullow (1830–1878), English politician, member of parliament (MP) for Truro 1863–1878
- Frederick W. Williams, Canadian politician

== Others ==
- Frederick A. Williams (1869–1942), American pianist and composer
- Frederick C. Williams (1855–1940), president of the Chico, California Board of Trustees from 1895 to 1897
- Frederick G. Williams (1787–1842), leader in The Church of Jesus Christ of Latter-day Saints
- Sir Frederick William Williams, 5th Baronet, of Tregullow (1888–1913), see the Williams baronets
- Sir Frederick Law Williams, 7th Baronet, of Tregullow (1862–1921), see the Williams baronets
- Frederick Smeeton Williams (1829–1886), Congregational minister and railway historian
- Frederic C. Williams (1911–1977), known as Freddie Williams, English engineer
- Frederic Newton Williams (1862–1923), English physician and botanist
- Frederic Williams (businessman) (1854–1940), New Zealand business proprietor, company director and community leader
- Frederick B. Williams (1939–2006), religious leader in the United States
- Frederick Dickinson Williams (1829–1915), American landscape artist
- Frederick Rotimi Williams (1920–2005), Nigerian lawyer
- Frederick Williams (priest) (1826–1885), Anglican clergyman
- Fred Williams (journalist) (1863–1944), Canadian newspaper journalist, writer, and historian
- Freedom Williams (Frederick Brandon Williams, born 1966), American hip-hop and dance music performer
- Cy Williams (Frederick Williams, 1887–1974), American baseball player
- Frederick Ballard Williams (1871–1956), American landscape and figure painter

== See also ==
- Frederick William (disambiguation)
- Fred Williams (disambiguation)
- Freddie Williams (disambiguation)
