= Fred Williams =

Fred Williams may refer to:

== Sports ==
=== American football ===
- Fred A. Williams (1878–1962), American college football player and coach
- Fred Williams (defensive lineman) (1929–2000), American football player
- Fred Williams (wide receiver) (born 1988), American football player

=== Association football (soccer) ===
- Fred Williams (footballer, born 1873) (1873–?), English footballer with Manchester City and Manchester United
- Fred Williams (Canadian soccer) (1896–1929), Canadian soccer player
- Fred Williams (footballer, born 1918) (1918–1994), English footballer with Southampton and Stockport County

=== Other sports ===
- Fred Williams (Australian footballer, born 1900) (1900–1975), Australian rules football player
- Fred Williams (Australian footballer, born 1919) (1919–2007), Australian rules football player
- Fred Williams (catcher) (fl. 1920s), American Negro league baseball catcher
- Fred Williams (first baseman) (1913–1993), American baseball first baseman and manager
- Fred Williams (basketball, born 1896) (1896–1937), American college basketball player
- Fred Williams (basketball, born 1957), American basketball coach
- Fred Williams (ice hockey) (born 1956), Canadian ice hockey player
- Freddie Williams (speedway rider) (1926–2013), Welsh motorcycle speedway rider

== Others ==
- Fred Williams (mayor) (1854–1940), mayor of Napier, New Zealand, 1902–1904
- Fred Williams (journalist) (1863–1944), Canadian newspaper editor, writer, and historian
- Fred Williams (lawyer) (1922–2020), American lawyer and civil rights activist
- Fred Williams (artist) (1927–1982), Australian painter
- Fred Williams (actor) (born 1938), German actor

== See also ==
- Freddie Williams (disambiguation)
- Frederick Williams (disambiguation)
- Fred Williamson (born 1938), American actor and former American football player
