= Frederick William =

The name Frederick William usually refers to several monarchs and princes of the Hohenzollern dynasty:

- Frederick William, the Great Elector (1620–1688)
- Frederick William, Duke of Mecklenburg-Schwerin (1675–1713)
- Frederick William I of Prussia (1688–1740), King of Prussia
- Frederick William II of Prussia (1744–1797), King of Prussia
- Frederick William III (1770–1840), King of Prussia
- Frederick William IV (1795–1861), King of Prussia
- Frederick William, Grand Duke of Mecklenburg-Strelitz (1819–1904)
- Frederick III, German Emperor (1831–1888), German Emperor and King of Prussia. He was known as Frederick William when he was Crown Prince.
- Prince Friedrich Wilhelm of Prussia (1880–1925), son of Prince Albert of Prussia and great-grandson of Frederick William III.

Other nobility with the name Frederick William are:

- Frederick William von Steuben (1730–1794), Prussian officer in the American Revolutionary War
- Frederick William von Hessenstein (1735–1808), Swedish statesman and soldier
- Frederick William Hervey, 1st Marquess of Bristol (1769–1859)
- Frederick William, Duke of Brunswick and Lüneburg (1771–1815)
- Frederick William, Elector of Hesse (1802–1875)
- Frederick William Pethick-Lawrence, 1st Baron Pethick-Lawrence (1871–1961)
- Frederick William Mulley (1918–1995), British politician and economist
- Prince Frederick William of Schleswig-Holstein-Sonderburg-Augustenburg (1668–1714)
- Prince Frederick of Great Britain (1750–1765), son of Frederick, Prince of Wales
- Prince Frederick William of Solms-Braunfels (1770–1814)
- Prince Frederick William of Hesse-Kassel (1820–1884)
- Frederick William III, Landgrave of Hesse (1854–1888)

== Other uses ==
- Frederick William University (Friedrich-Wilhelms-Universität), a predecessor to the Humboldt University of Berlin
- Mount Frederick William, Jervis Inlet region, British Columbia, Canada

== See also ==
- Frederick William I (disambiguation)
- Frederick William II (disambiguation)
- Frederick William III (disambiguation)
- Friedrich Wilhelm (disambiguation)
- Frederick Williams (disambiguation)
