= Frederick II of Saxony =

Frederick II of Saxony may refer to:

- Frederick II, Elector of Saxony (1412–1464), Elector of Saxony between 1428 and 1464
- Frederick Augustus II of Saxony (1797–1854), king of Saxony between 1836 and 1854

== See also ==
- Frederick II (disambiguation)
