= Frederick II of Sicily =

Frederick II of Sicily may refer to:

- Frederick II, Holy Roman Emperor (1194–1250), who technically was Frederick I of Sicily but the regnal number II was used of him throughout his various realms
- Frederick III of Sicily (1272–1337), who technically was Frederick II but used Frederick III

== See also ==
- Frederick II (disambiguation)
