= Statute of Frauds and the Doctrine of Consideration =

English law report

Statute of Frauds and the Doctrine of Consideration (1937) Cmnd 5449 was a report by the Law Revision Committee on the consideration and formality in English contract law and other areas. It did not recommend abolition of the doctrine of consideration but made a series of recommendations to overturn the existing restrictions that had been developed by some common law courts.

== Overview ==
The Law Revision Committee recommend the following transactions should be binding per se.

- promises in writing
- promises for past consideration
- promises to accept part payments of debt to discharge the whole
- promising to do what one is already bound to do
- firm offers, where it is open for a period
- promises detrimentally relied on by the promise, where the promisor should have known reliance would happen

The statute recommended passing legislation "to the effect that either the promise to pay a lesser sum or the payment of a lesser sum should discharge a greater obligation when agreed to by the creditor".

== See also ==
- English contract law
- English trusts law
