= Frederick III of Germany =

Frederick III of Germany may refer to:

- Frederick the Fair, the third king of Germany named Frederick (r. 1314–1330)
- Frederick III, Holy Roman Emperor (r. 1440–1493)
- Frederick III, German Emperor (r. 1888)

== See also ==
- Frederick III (disambiguation)
