= Frederick of Habsburg =

Frederick of Habsburg or Friedrich von Habsburg may refer to:

- Frederick the Fair (1289–1330), king of Germany
- Frederick II of Habsburg (1327/33–1344), nobleman
- Frederick III, Duke of Austria (1347–1362)
- Frederick III, Holy Roman Emperor (1415–1493)

== See also ==
- Frederick III (disambiguation)
