= Frederick II =

Frederick II, Frederik II or Friedrich II may refer to:

- Frederick II, Holy Roman Emperor (1194–1250), King of Sicily from 1198; Holy Roman Emperor from 1220
- Frederick II of Denmark (1534–1588), king of Denmark and Norway 1559–1588
- Frederick II of Prussia (1712–1786), king 1740–1786, better known as Frederick the Great
- Frederick II, Grand Duke of Baden (1857–1928)
- Frederick II, Elector of Saxony (1412–1464)
- Frederick II, Elector of Brandenburg (1413–1471), margrave 1440–1470
- Frederick II, Elector Palatine (1482–1556), elector 1544–1556
- Frederick II (Archbishop of Cologne) (1120–1158)
- Frederick II, Duke of Upper Lorraine (995–1026), count of Bar and duke of Lorraine, co-reigning with his father from 1019
- Frederick II, Duke of Swabia (1090–1147)
- Frederick II, Duke of Lorraine (died 1213)
- Frederick II, Duke of Austria (died 1246), Duke of Austria 1230–1246
- Frederick II, Duke of Brunswick-Lüneburg (1418–1478)
- Frederick II, Duke of Holstein-Gottorp (1568–1587)
- Frederick II, Duke of Saxe-Gotha-Altenburg (1676–1732)
- Frederick II, Duke of Mecklenburg-Schwerin (1717–1785), called the Pious
- Friedrich II, Duke of Anhalt (1856–1918)
- Frederik II van Sierck (died 1322), bishop of Utrecht
- Frederick II, Margrave of Baden-Eberstein (died 1333)
- Frederick II, Margrave of Meissen (1310–1349)
- Frederick II, Marquess of Saluzzo (died 1396)
- Frederick II, Landgrave of Hesse-Homburg (1633–1708), hero of Heinrich von Kleist's play Der Prinz von Homburg
- Frederick II, Landgrave of Hesse-Kassel (1720–1785)
- Frederick II, Count of Diessen (1030–1075), bailiff of Regensburg cathedral
- Frederick II, Count of Celje (1379–1454), Ban of Croatia, Slavonia and Dalmatia
- Frederick II, Count of Vaudémont (1420s–1470), Lord of Joinville
- Frederick II Eugene, Duke of Württemberg (1732–1797)
- Frederick the Second, 1927 biography of Frederick II, Holy Roman Emperor, by Ernst Kantorowicz

== See also ==
- Frederik II Upper Secondary School in Fredrikstad, Norway, named for Frederick II of Denmark
- Frederick III of Sicily (1272–1337), the second Frederick to rule the kingdom
- Frederick Augustus II, Elector of Saxony (1696–1763) better known as King August III of Poland
- Frederick Augustus II of Saxony (1797–1854), king of Saxony 1836–1854
- Frederick Augustus II, Grand Duke of Oldenburg (1852–1931)
- Frederick Christian II, Duke of Schleswig-Holstein-Sonderburg-Augustenburg (1765–1814)
- Frederick Francis II, Grand Duke of Mecklenburg-Schwerin (1823–1883)
- Frederick William II (disambiguation)
