= Frederick II of Denmark =

King of Denmark and Norway from 1559 to 1588

Frederick II
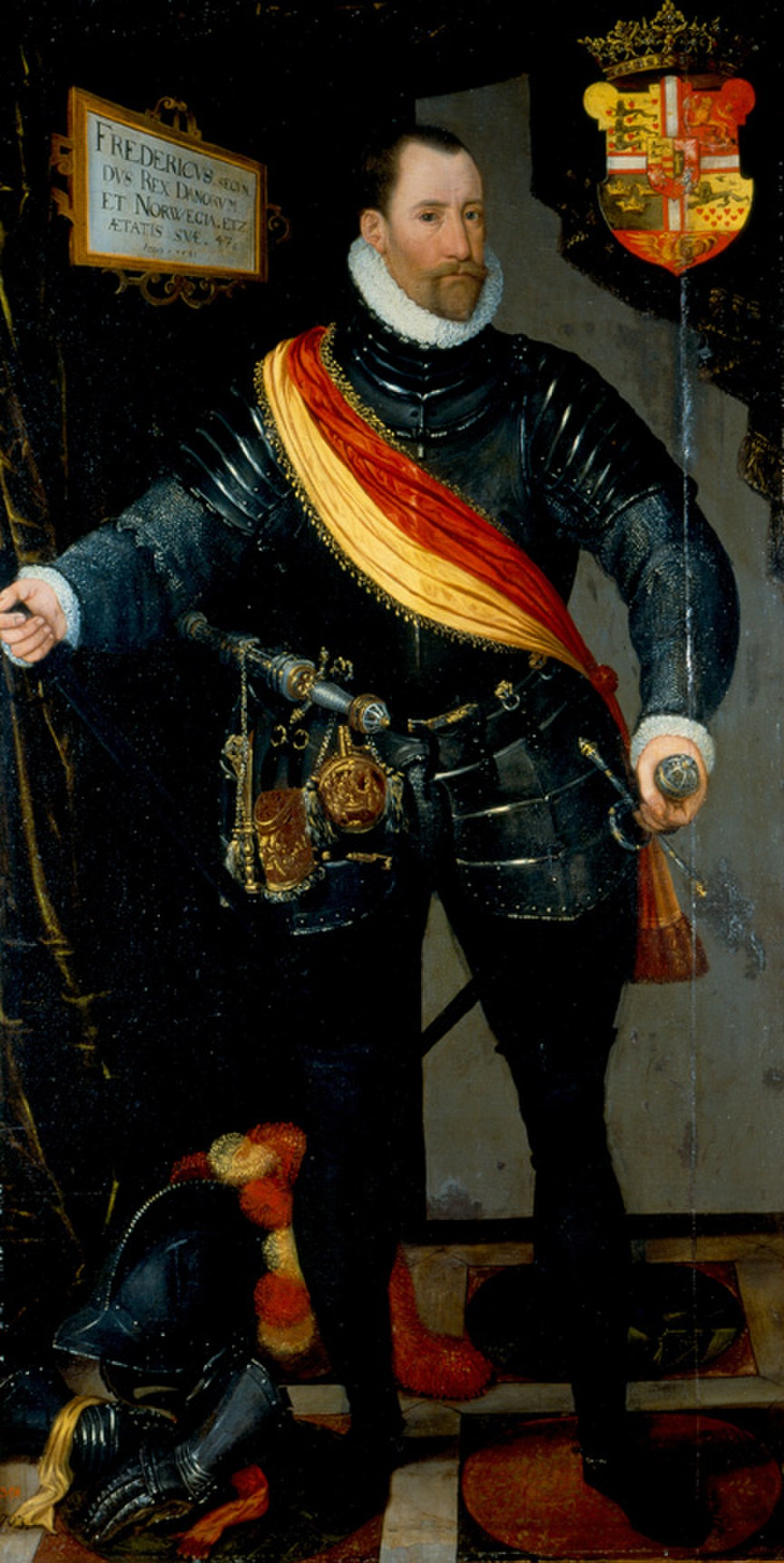
- Portrait by Hans Knieper, 1581

King of Denmark and Norway
- Reign: 1 January 1559 – 4 April 1588
- Coronation: 20 August 1559; Copenhagen Cathedral
- Predecessor: Christian III
- Successor: Christian IV
- Born: 1 July 1534; Haderslevhus Castle, Haderslev, Denmark
- Died: 4 April 1588 (aged 53); Antvorskov Castle, Zealand, Denmark
- Burial: 5 August 1588; Roskilde Cathedral, Zealand, Denmark
- Spouse: Sophie of Mecklenburg-Güstrow (m. 1572)
- Issue Detail: Elizabeth, Duchess of Brunswick-Lüneburg; Anne, Queen of England, Scotland, and Ireland; Christian IV; Ulrik, Prince-Bishop of Schwerin; Augusta, Duchess of Holstein-Gottorp; Hedwig, Electress of Saxony; John, Prince of Schleswig-Holstein
- House: Oldenburg
- Father: Christian III
- Mother: Dorothea of Saxe-Lauenburg
- Religion: Lutheran

Frederick II (Danish: Frederik 2.; 1 July 1534 – 4 April 1588) was King of Denmark and Norway and Duke of Schleswig and Holstein from 1559 until his death in 1588.

A member of the House of Oldenburg, Frederick began his personal rule of Denmark–Norway at the age of 24. He inherited capable and strong realms, formed in large by his father after the civil war known as the Count's Feud, after which Denmark–Norway saw a period of economic recovery and of a great increase in the centralised authority of the Crown. Frederick was, especially in his youth and unlike his father, belligerent and adversarial, aroused by honor and national pride, and so he began his reign auspiciously with a campaign under the aged Johan Rantzau, which reconquered Dithmarschen. However, after miscalculating the cost of the Northern Seven Years' War, he pursued a more prudent foreign policy. The remainder of Frederick II's reign was a period of tranquillity, in which king and nobles prospered. Frederick spent more time hunting and feasting with his councillors, and focused on architecture and science. During his reign, many building projects were begun, including additions to the royal castles of Kronborg at Elsinore and Frederikborg Castle at Hillerød.

Frederick has to a great extent been overshadowed by his popular, long-reigning son Christian IV, and often been portrayed with skepticism and resentment, resulting in the prevailing portrait of Frederick as a man and as king: an unlettered, inebriated, brutish sot. However, recent studies reappraise and acknowledge him as highly intelligent; he craved the company of learned men, and in the correspondence and legislation he dictated to his secretaries he showed himself to be quick-witted and articulate. Frederick was also open and loyal, and had a knack for establishing close personal bonds with fellow princes and with those who served him.

In 1572, Frederick married his cousin Sophie of Mecklenburg. Their relationship is regarded as one of the happiest royal marriages in Renaissance Europe. In the first ten years after the wedding, they had seven children, and are described as inseparable and harmonious.

Frederick was committed to becoming the mightiest king in the North, and for several years he fought exhausting wars against his rival Erik XIV of Sweden, after which the battles changed character. It became a competition to see who could trace their family history the furthest, and who could construct the most formidable castles. In the 1570s he constructed Kronborg, a large Renaissance castle that became widely recognized abroad, and its dance hall was the largest in Northern Europe at the time. He enjoyed entertaining guests and throwing elaborate festivities, which were well known throughout Europe. During the same period, the Danish-Norwegian fleet was developed into one of Europe's largest and most modern. As part of his efforts to strengthen the kingdoms, he provided much support for science and culture.

== Early years and education ==
Frederick was born on 1 July 1534 at Haderslevhus Castle, the son of Duke Christian of Schleswig and Holstein (later King Christian III of Denmark and Norway) and Dorothea of Saxe-Lauenburg, the daughter of Magnus I, Duke of Saxe-Lauenburg. His mother was the sister of Catherine, the first wife of the Swedish king Gustav Vasa, and the mother of Eric XIV, his future rival.

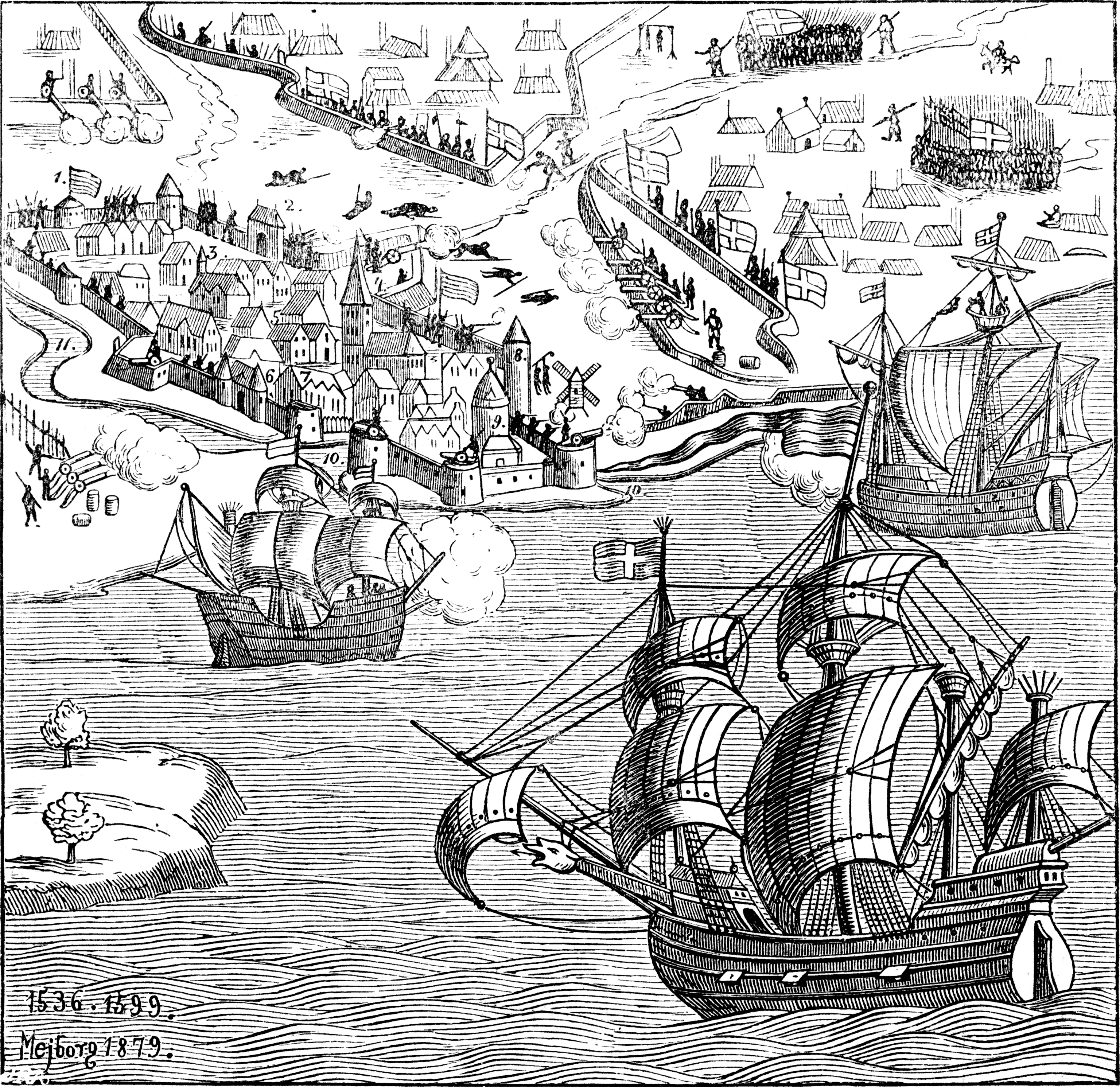
The Siege of Copenhagen 1535–1536 during the Count's Feud, a period of Danish instability that would shape Frederick's childhood.

At the time of Frederick's birth, a civil war of Denmark was coming to an end (just three days after Frederick's birth his father Christian became King of Denmark). The previous king, Frederick I, died on 10 April the year before, but the Danish Council of the Realm, which traditionally ruled the kingdom with the king, had not chosen a successor, and now Denmark had, for more than a year, functioned as an Aristocratic Republic. The father of the newborn Frederick, Christian, although eldest son of the late king, was not automatically King of Denmark, as the kingship in Denmark was not hereditary, but elective. Noblemen of the Council of the Realm could choose to pick another member of the royal family as king if they so decided.

Frederick I and his son Christian were staunch Protestants and adherents to the Lutheran cause, however, in the Council of the Realm, which consisted of many Catholic bishops as well as a number of powerful noblemen from the old nobility, there were a majority to support the established Catholic Church. After a period of interregnum and after subsequent risings in favour of the former King Christian II, a period known as the Count's Feud, Christian III finally became victorious, and was proclaimed King of a new Protestant Denmark.

=== Proclaimed heir apparent ===
After King Christian III's victory in the Count's Feud, royal power had now returned to Denmark, and in such a way that the king could set his own terms. In his haandfæstning, a document which all former Danish Kings must sign, and which regulates the relationship between king and nobility, he reduced the nobility's power, and established that the first son of the king should always be seen as heir apparent, and succeed his father automatically.

On 30 October 1536 Christian convened the estates of the realm (Rigsdag) to Copenhagen, where they formally proclaimed Frederick heir apparent and successor to the throne, granting him the title "Prince of Denmark". In 1542, the Prince travelled around Denmark and was hailed by the people. In the Midsummer of 1548 Christian III and his son Frederick, in a fleet of 7 ships and together with 30 Danish nobles, sailed for Oslo, where Frederick was hailed as heir apparent to the Throne of the Kingdom of Norway. The royal reception included Danish nobles holding fiefs in Norway, received by Prince Frederick on his ship. The entire Norwegian nobility had been summoned to Oslo.

=== Upbringing ===
While Christian III secured control of Denmark and Norway, his and Dorothea's children grew up in the bosom of the family. In addition to Anna, who was born in 1532, and Frederick from 1534, the group of siblings consisted of Magnus, born 1540, and John, who was born in 1545 and called John the Younger, to distinguish him from Christian III's half-brother, John the Elder. Youngest was a girl who was born in 1546 and named after her mother.

It was the usual pedagogical view of the time that parents were so inclined to spoil their own children that the upbringing of the children should be delegated to other members of the family, typically the child's maternal grandparents. But Queen Dorothea didn't want to send the children away when in infancy. Moreover, her own mother was suspected of nurturing Catholic sympathies, and in the religious era, a Lutheran Danish king could not in good conscience expose his child to Catholic influences. Another contributing factor has probably been the royal couple's concern by leaving the children too much out of sight in the tense political situation that prevailed in the first ten years of Frederick's life.

=== Education ===
Frederick's education, although profound and thorough, was focused on the ecclesiastical and Lutheran doctrine, Frederick mainly learning instructions in theology. While a princely educational program, which included learning the art of stewardship, diplomacy and war, was proposed and planned by the Danish Chancellor, it was not executed in full as the Danish Chancellor's relationship with Christian III deteriorated before the education could begin.

Life at the court of Christian III and Dorothea was imbued with a fervent Lutheran Christianity with which all their children naturally grew up. In March 1538 Chancellor Wolfgang von Utenhof proposed an educational program for the young Prince Frederick. He was to have a Danish court steward, but he also had to work with and be inspected daily by a chamberlain, who was to be a reliable and sobering man from the Holstein nobility. The prince had to learn Latin, German, Danish, French and other languages, and when he got older he had to learn fencing and other chivalry exercises. He was to have 10–15 young men for company both in his studies and in his chivalrous exercises.

To which extent this educational program was followed is not known. In 1541, Frederick aged 7, he began his schooling. Frederick was appointed Hans Svenning, a reputed Danish humanist and professor of rhetoric at University of Copenhagen, as teacher.

=== Dyslexia ===
Christian III and Dorothea had probably been expecting a lot from Frederick's schooling. According to them, the son was obviously bright and had a good memory. So much bigger has the disappointment, and the amazement, been when the teaching started. Frederick learned to write beautiful and clear letters, but when it came to reading and spelling, the royal student was "a disaster".

For Hans Svaning, this deranged spelling of Frederick's could only be seen as sloppy and laziness, given that the royal boy otherwise seemed smart enough. Time and time again, Frederick has been punished, probably not only by the teacher, but also by his strict mother, who would gladly step in if Svaning's teaching was not sufficient.

Because of Frederick's heavy dyslexia, he was perceived by his contemporaries as unlettered and illiterate. Both Frederick's father and mother looked with skepticism at the heir to the throne, and they kept him under the watchful eye of knowledgeable men as far as possible to prevent him from publicly speaking out. Neither did his father entrust Frederick with any administrative duties.

=== Malmøhus ===
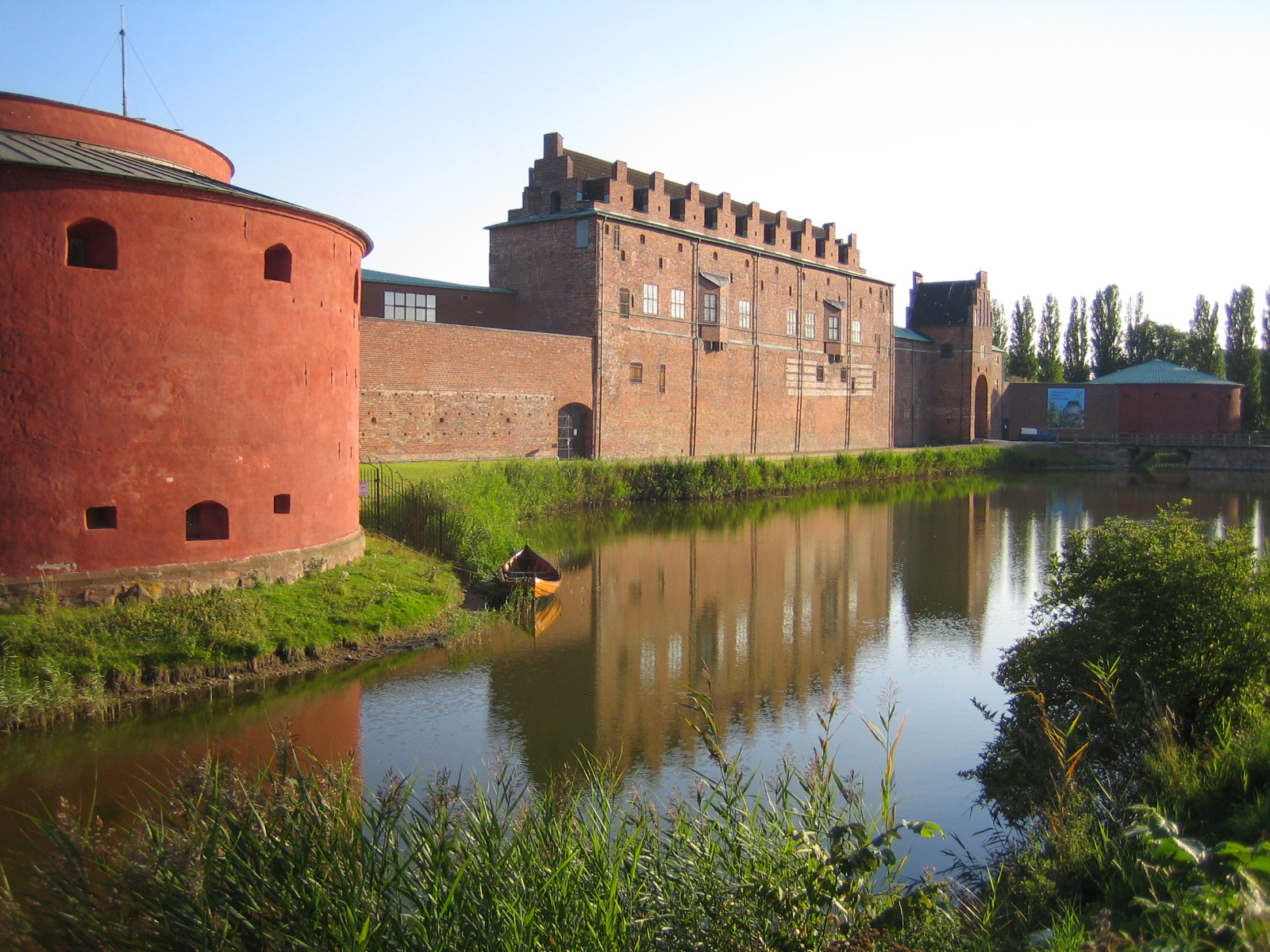
Malmö Castle in Scania, where Frederick spent much of his later youth

It was only at the age of 20 in 1554 that Frederick was allowed to hold his own court at Malmö Castle in Scania, but under the supervision of the middle-aged lensman ('Fief-man') Ejler Hardenberg, who was appointed the prince's court master. At the same time, political training began, which was put in the hands of the two driven noblemen Eiler Rønnow and Erik Rosenkrantz. The years in Scania, must have felt like a liberation for Frederick. He had finally escaped from the royal court with its tightly regulated existences and pious daily lives. Just outside the moats around Malmö Castle was the lively trading town of Malmö, which offered a young man all-out experiences.

While spending many of his youth years in Scania, he became known as the "Prince of Scania" (princeps Scaniæ) (Danish: Fyrste af Skåne). It is not known whether this title was ever officially decreed to him.

=== Travels to Germany with his brother-in-law ===
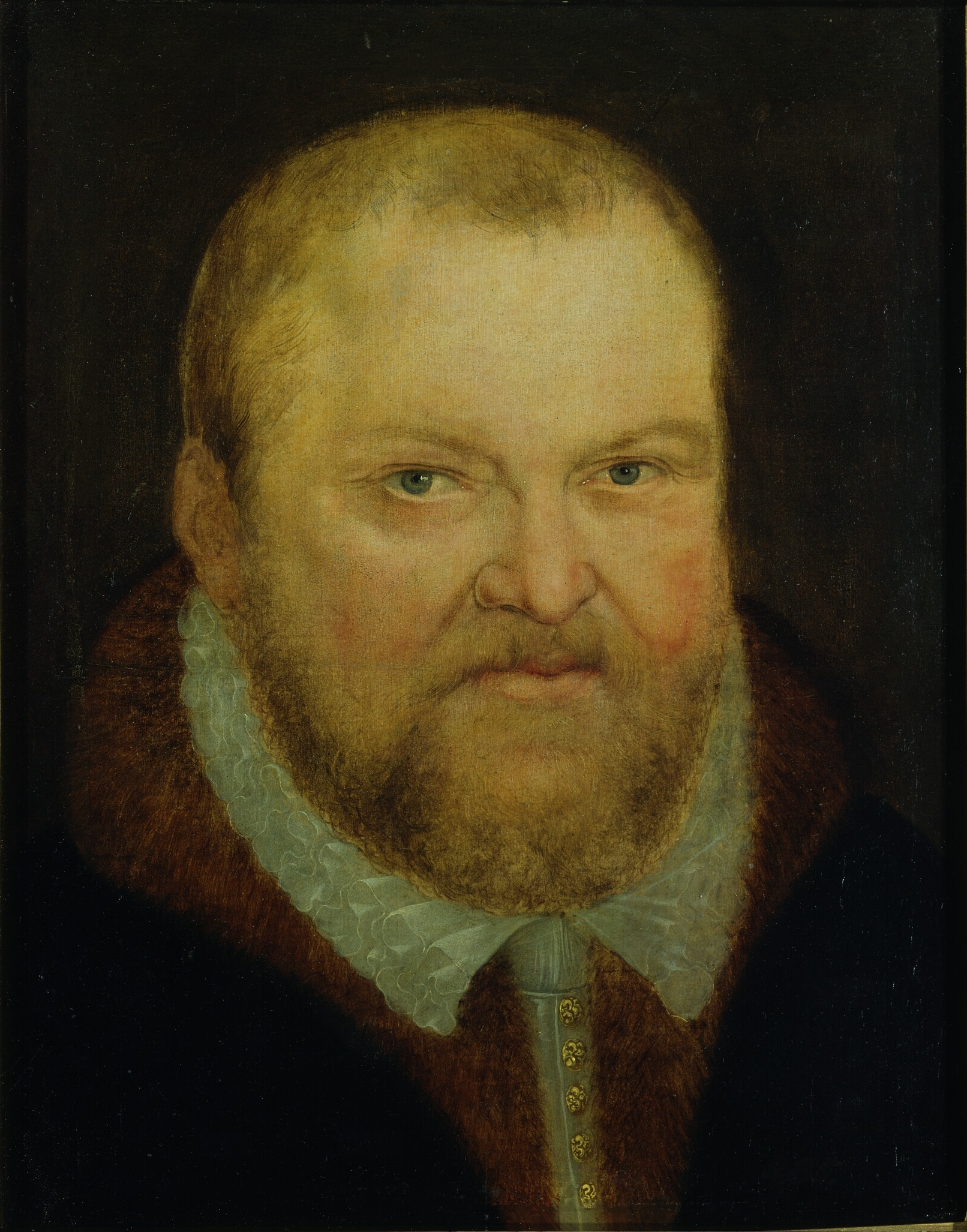
Frederick II's close friend and companion, Augustus, Elector of Saxony

The only political education that Frederick received came from his close friendship with his brother-in-law, Elector Augustus of Saxony (reigned 1553–86). Some authors have later stated that Augustus was "the only strong emotional support" Frederick received in his youth.

Augustus, who was the husband of Frederick's elder sister Anne, took Frederick under his wing, chaperoning him on a trip throughout the Holy Roman Empire in 1557–58. Here Frederick made the acquaintance of the new emperor, Ferdinand I (reigned 1558–64) at his coronation, his son and heir apparent Maximilian (emperor 1564–76), William of Orange, and a host of other more prominent German Protestant princes. The experience nurtured in Frederick a lasting appreciation of the great complexity of German politics and a taste for all things military.

This was most troubling to Frederick's father, the ageing Christian III, who feared that in the Empire Frederick would develop ambitions that would exceed both his abilities and the resources of his kingdoms, and that the trip would ultimately drag Denmark–Norway into the maelstrom of German princely politics.

=== Peder Oxe ===
In 1552, Steward of the Realm, Peder Oxe, had been raised to Councillor of State (Rigsraad). During the spring of 1557, Oxe and the King had quarreled over a mutual property exchange. Failing to compromise matters with the King, Oxe had fled to Germany in 1558.

== Reign ==
=== Proclaimed King ===
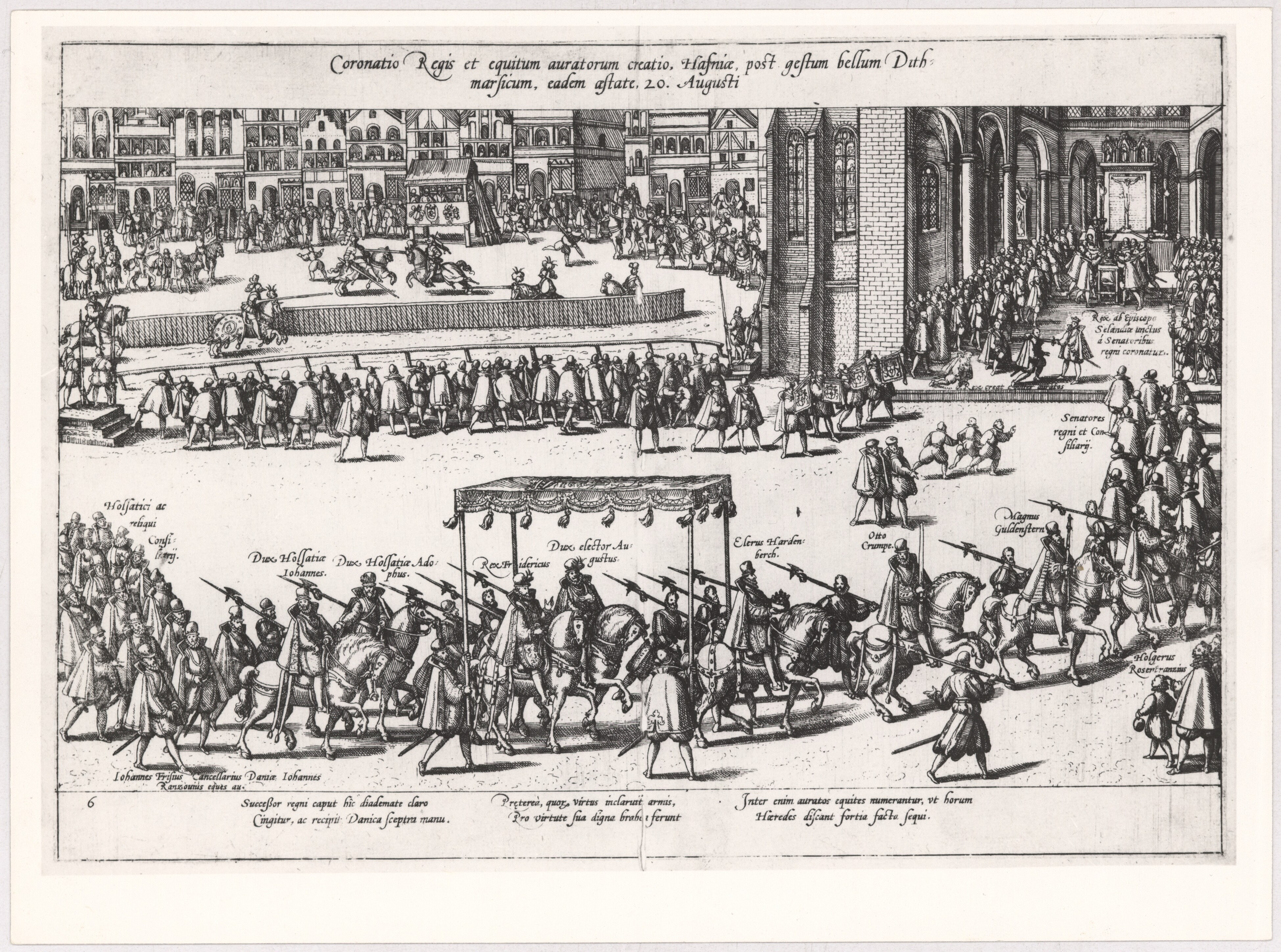
20 August 1559: Coronatio Regis et equitum auratorum creatio, Hafniæ, post gestum bellum Dithmarsicum, eadem æstate, 20. Augusti.

Frederick's father Christian III died on 1 January 1559 at Koldinghus. Frederick was not present at his father's bedside when he died, a circumstance that did not endear the new king, now King Frederick II of Denmark–Norway, to the councillors who had grown to appreciate and revere Christian.

On 12 August 1559 Frederick signed his haandfæstning (lit. "Handbinding" viz. curtailment of the monarch's power, a Danish parallel to the Magna Carta) and on 20 August 1559 Frederick II was crowned at the Church of Our Lady in Copenhagen by a Danish superintendent, with Nicolaus Palladius and Jens Skielderup two Norwegian superintendent assisting, symbolizing the relationship between the kingdoms of Denmark and Norway. Week-long and elaborate celebrations are said to have taken place after the coronation.

=== Conquest of Ditmarschen ===
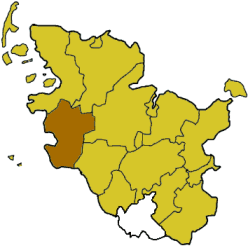
Dithmarschen

Within weeks of Christian's death, Frederick joined with his uncles in Holstein, John and Adolf, in a military campaign to conquer the Ditmarschen, under Johan Rantzau. Frederick II's great-uncle, King John, had failed to subjugate the peasant republic in 1500, but the Frederick's 1559-campaign was a quick and relatively painless victory for Denmark–Norway. The brevity and low cost of the campaign were cold comforts to the members of the Council of the Realm, Johan Friis in particular. Friis had warned Frederick that a very real threat of conflict with Sweden loomed just over the horizon, but the king had not listened, and had not even consulted with the Council about the Ditmarschen.

=== Early relationship with the Council of the Realm ===
The adversarial king–Council relationship improved relatively quickly however, and not because Frederick caved in to conciliar opposition. Rather, the two parties quickly learned to work together because their interests, and the Kingdom's, required that they did so. From an early time, the council invested much power in Frederick, as they had no desire to go back to the destructive near-anarchy of the pre-civil war years.

Frederick would soon learn how to play the constitutional game that is required in a consensual monarchy, such as Denmark; namely to humour the Council without sacrificing his own royal interests. This meant showing generosity to the conciliar aristocracy through various gifts and concessions, which he did in grand style. Shortly before the signing of his coronation charter (haandfæstning), Andreas von Barby, leader of the German Chancery, died. Barby was not well liked in the Council of the Realm, but he was extreamly wealthy. The extensive fiefs in his possession reverted to the Crown, and Frederick was careful to distribute out these properties among the leading members of the Council of the Realm. Throughout his reign, Frederick would reward his conciliar aristocracy generously. Fiefs were distributed on highly favourable terms.

The substantially warmer relationship between king and Council of the Realm after the Ditmarschen campaign is best illustrated by the Danish central administration's performance in the greatest national crisis of the reign, the Northern Seven Years' War (1563–70) against Sweden.

=== Relationship with Livonia ===
From his predecessor, Frederick inherited the Livonian War. In 1560, he installed his younger brother, Magnus of Holstein (1540–1583), in the Bishopric of Ösel–Wiek. King Frederick II largely tried to avoid conflict in Livonia and consolidated amicable relations with Tsar Ivan IV of Russia in the 1562 Treaty of Mozhaysk. His brother Magnus was later made titular King of Livonia, as a vassal of Tsar Ivan IV.

=== Northern Seven Years' War ===
King Frederick's competition with Sweden for supremacy in the Baltic broke out into open warfare in 1563, the start of the Northern Seven Years' War, the dominating conflict of his rule.

The leading councillors, Johan Friis foremost among them, had feared a Swedish onslaught for several years, and after the succession of Frederick II's first cousin, the ambitious and unbalanced Eric XIV (reigned 1560–1568) to the Vasa throne a confrontation appeared inevitable. Still, few councillors wanted war, and they preferred to wait until it was forced upon them, while Frederick preferred a preemptive strike. Despite its initial opposition to the war, the Council of the Realm went along with the king. Frederick II, wisely, made no effort to exclude the council from the direction of the war, and though he retained chief operational control he entrusted much responsibility to his councillors, including Holger Ottesen Rosenkrants, Marshal Otte Krumpen, and Admiral Herluf Trolle.

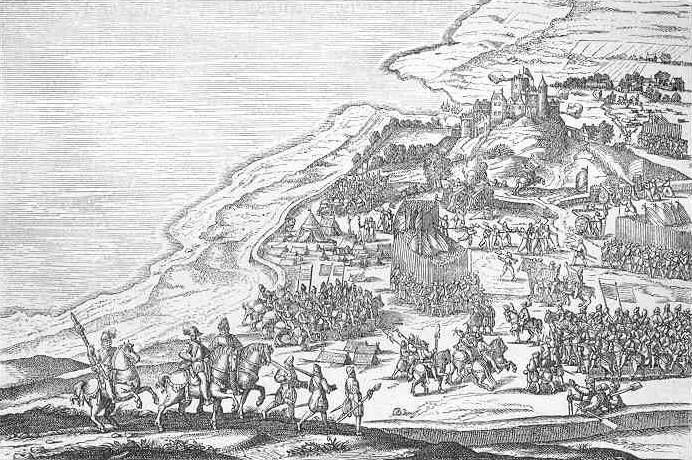
Frederick II of Denmark–Norway attacking Älvsborg, 1563

Only one constitutional crisis emerged during the war; in late 1569, after six years of war, the Council decided not to provide the king with further grants of taxation. The war had been costly, both in lives and in gold, but since 1565 Denmark–Norway had made no appreciable gains. The council had already asked Frederick to make peace, and he had made a half-hearted attempt to do so in 1568, but neither Frederick nor his Swedish opponent was willing to concede defeat.

The war developed into an extremely expensive war of attrition in which the areas of Scania were ravaged by the Swedes, and Norway was almost lost. During this war, King Frederick II led his army personally on the battlefield, but although with some small success, overall without much result.

The council, in cutting off financial support, had hoped to coerce the king into ending the war. Frederick felt betrayed, and after some reflection, felt that the only honourable recourse was abdication. With his letter of resignation in the hands of the councillors, he left the capital to go hunting in the countryside. The king, still unmarried, had no heir, and consequently the Council of the Realm had good reason to fear another leaderless interregnum and even another civil war. It played into the king's hands; the Council begging for his return to the throne and allowed him to summon a Diet to consider additional tax levies.

The conflict damaged his relationship with his noble councillors; however, the later Sture murders of 24 May 1567 by the insane King Eric XIV in Sweden, eventually helped stabilize the situation in Denmark–Norway. After King John III of Sweden, King Eric's successor, refused to accept a peace favoring Denmark–Norway in the Treaties of Roskilde (1568), the ongoing war dragged on until it was ended by a status quo peace in the Treaty of Stettin (1570), that let Denmark–Norway save face but also show limits of Danish and Norwegian military power.

Frederick II learned a great deal about kingship during the war with Sweden. He learned to include the Council of the Realm in most matters of policy, but he also learned that it was possible to manipulate the council, even to bend it to his own will, without humiliating it or undermining its authority. He would later come to master this ability and use it extensively.

=== Later reign ===
During the eighteen remaining years of his reign, Frederick would come to drew extensively on the lessons he learned in the Northern Seven Years' War with Eric XIV of Sweden. In the peacetime years, he maintained a rather peripatetic court, moving from residence to residence throughout the Danish countryside, spending a fair share of his time in hunting. This allowed him the opportunity to meet members of the Council individually and informally, in their home regions. As was required of the Danish King, he did summon the Council of the Realm once annually to meet at the herredag, but most of his business with the council was done on a one-to-one basis. This ensured a very close personal bond with each member of the council while minimizing the opportunity for the council to oppose him as a full body. Frederick's personable disposition also helped, and so, too, did the informal nature of court life under Frederick II. The king hunted, feasted, and drank with his noble councillors and advisers, and even with visiting foreign dignitaries, treating them as his equal peers and companions rather than as political opponents or inferiors. The eighteenth-century chronicler Ludvig Holberg claimed that when dining at his court, Frederick would frequently announce that 'the king is not at home', which signalled to his guests that all court formalities were temporarily suspended, and that they could talk and joke as they pleased without restraint. The Danish court of Frederick II may have appeared to be unsophisticated to outside observers, but the openness and bawdiness of court life served Frederick's political purposes. In 1585, he visited Norway for the first and only time as king, but only went to Bohuslen.

==== Financial situation ====
The great cost of the Northern Seven Years' War, some 1.1 million rigsdaler, was recovered chiefly from higher taxation on both Danish and Norwegian farm properties. After state finances collapsed in the aftermath of the war, King Frederick II called Peder Oxe home to address the kingdom's economy. The taking over of Danish administration and finances by the able councillor, provided a marked improvement for the national treasury. Councillors of experience, including Niels Kaas, Arild Huitfeldt, and Christoffer Valkendorff, took care of the domestic administration. Subsequently, government finances were put in order and Denmark–Norway's economy improved. One of the chief expedients of the improved state of affairs was the raising of the Sound Dues. Oxe, as lord treasurer, reduced the national debt considerably and redeemed portions of crown lands.

=== Constructions in reign ===
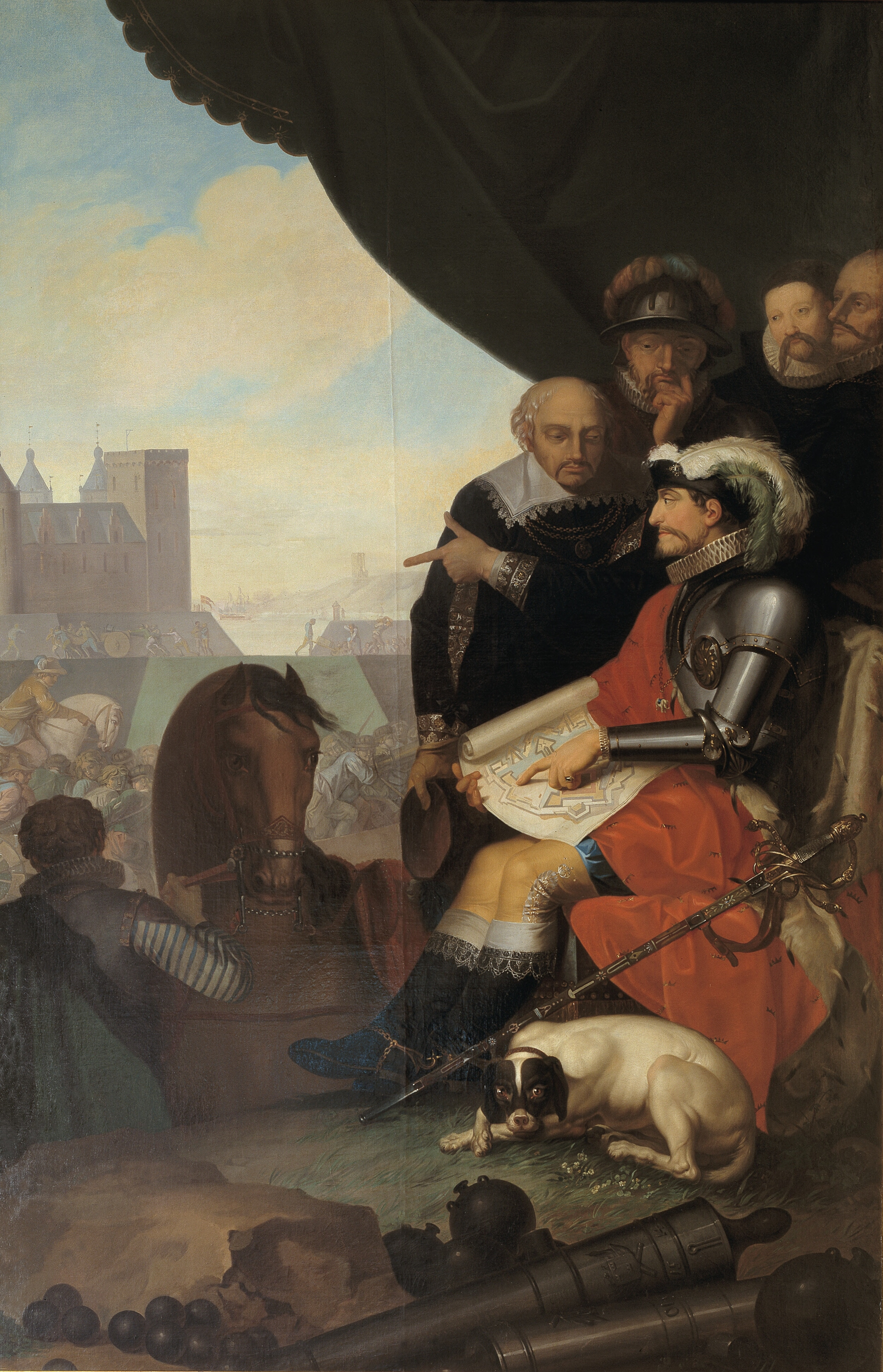
King Frederick II builds Kronborg Castle at Elsinore.

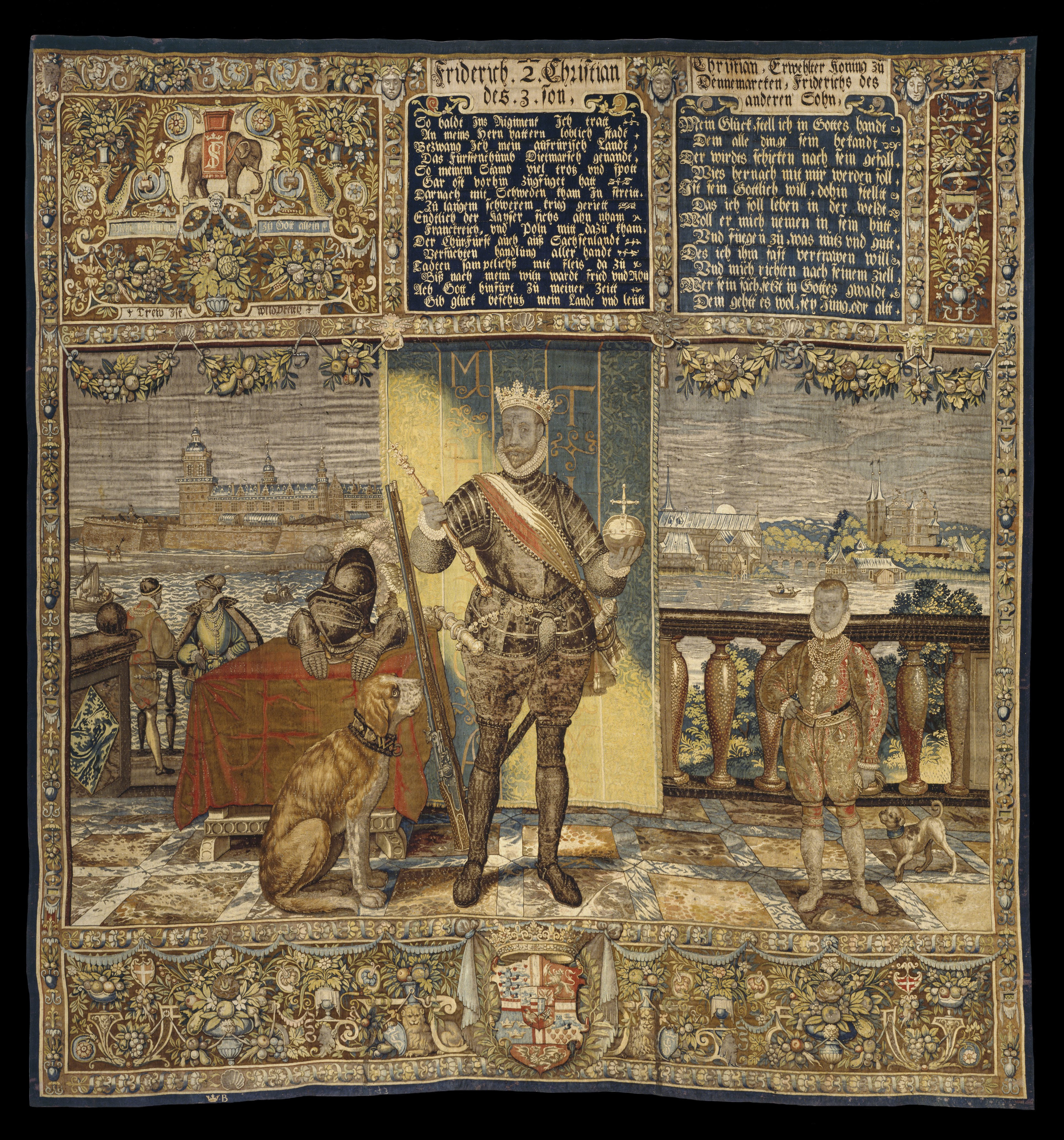
Frederick II and a young crown prince Christian (IV) depicted on one of the 15 surviving Kronborg Tapestries

After the Northern Seven Years' War a period of affluence and growth followed in Danish-Norwegian history. The greater financial liquidity of the crown and the king's decreased dependence on the Council for funding, while not meaning that Frederick was actively seeking to sidestep conciliar control, it did allow him to be less frugal than his late father, Christian III, had been. Considerable funds were devoted to an expansion of the Danish-Norwegian fleet and of the facilities for its support, not merely for security purposes but also to aid Frederick's active endeavours to rid the Baltic Sea of pirates. The increased revenues likewise enabled Frederick to undertake the construction of Denmark's first national road network, the so-called kongevej (King's Road), connecting the larger towns and the royal residences.

The most visible area of expenditure, however, was the royal castles and the court itself. Frederick spent freely on the reconstruction of several royal residences and other cities:

- Antvorskov (near Slagelse, Sjælland), was one of Frederick's favourite hunting-castles. He later died at Antvorskov.
- In 1567, King Frederick II founded Fredrikstad in Norway. Frederik II Upper Secondary School in Fredrikstad, one of the largest schools of its kind in Norway, is named after Frederick.
- He also rebuilt Kronborg in Elsinore from a medieval fortress into a magnificent Renaissance castle, between 1574 and 1585. He commissioned the so-called Kronborg Tapestries for the Great Hall. The 43 tapestries were created in Helsingør by Dutch tapestry makers. They depicted more than 100 Danish kings, starting with the legendary King Dan and ending with himself and a young crown prince Christian (IV) standing in front of Kronborg Castle
- In 1560 Frederick converted the North Sealand farm Hillerødsholm into a great Renaissance castle, Frederiksborg.
- In 1561, Frederick II developed and fortified Skanderborg Castle with materials from Øm Abbey.

For all Frederick's egalitarian behaviour at his court, Frederick was acutely aware of his elevated status. Like most monarchs of his day, he sought to bolster his international reputation through a measure of ostentatious display, in his patronage of artists and musicians, as well as in the elaborate ceremonies staged for royal weddings and other public celebrations.

=== Kronborg and "The King's Sound" ===
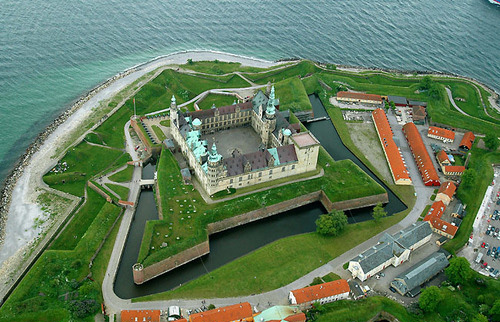
Kronborg Castle in Elsinore

Frederick II had claimed naval supremacy in 'the king's sound', as he called The Sound and, indeed, the whole expanse of waters lying between his Norwegian and Icelandic possessions. In 1583 he secured an agreement by which England made an annual payment for permission to sail there, and France later followed suit.

He also tried to bring the Icelandic trade and fisheries into the hands of his own subjects instead of Englishmen and Germans and encouraged adventurers such as Magnus Heinason, to whom he gave a monopoly of trade with the Faeroes, a half-share in ships captured on unlawful passage to the White Sea, and backing for a bold but unsuccessful attempt to reach east Greenland.

== Relationship with the Church ==
The necessity of maintaining order within the church meant that royal interference into ecclesiastical affairs was unavoidable. There was no longer an archbishop within the hierarchy, so the king was the final authority in matters that could not be settled by the bishops alone. As his father, Christian III, put it, kings were the 'father to the superintendents'.

As protector of the church and therefore of the clergy, Frederick frequently intervened in disputes between clergy and laity, even when the issues involved were trivial ones.

Frederick II repeatedly came to the defence of new parish priests whose congregations tried to force them to marry their predecessors' widows, and sometimes to protect preachers from the wrath of overbearing noblemen. Conversely, the king – and especially Frederick II – would see to it personally that unruly, incompetent, or disreputable priests lost their parishes, or he would pardon those who had been punished by their superintendents for minor infractions. Protecting and disciplining the clergy was, after all, part of the king's obligation to the state church.

Frederick II was more active than his late father in extending his royal authority into areas that the 1537 Ordinance had protected from secular power. Frederick consulted with members of the theological faculty at the University of Copenhagen—the so-called 'most learned ones' (højlærde)—but he did not shy away from making changes in the most minute liturgical matters. He stipulated the books that every parish priest should have in his library, set standardized times for worship services in the towns, and set minimal standards of competence for all preachers. Although Frederick interfered much in ecclesiastical affairs, Paul Douglas Lockhart pointed out, that Frederick "was not interested in dictating conscience", stating that "he wanted only to prevent useless religious disputes, disputes that could weaken the kingdom and leave it vulnerable to Catholic aggression".

=== Book of Concord ===
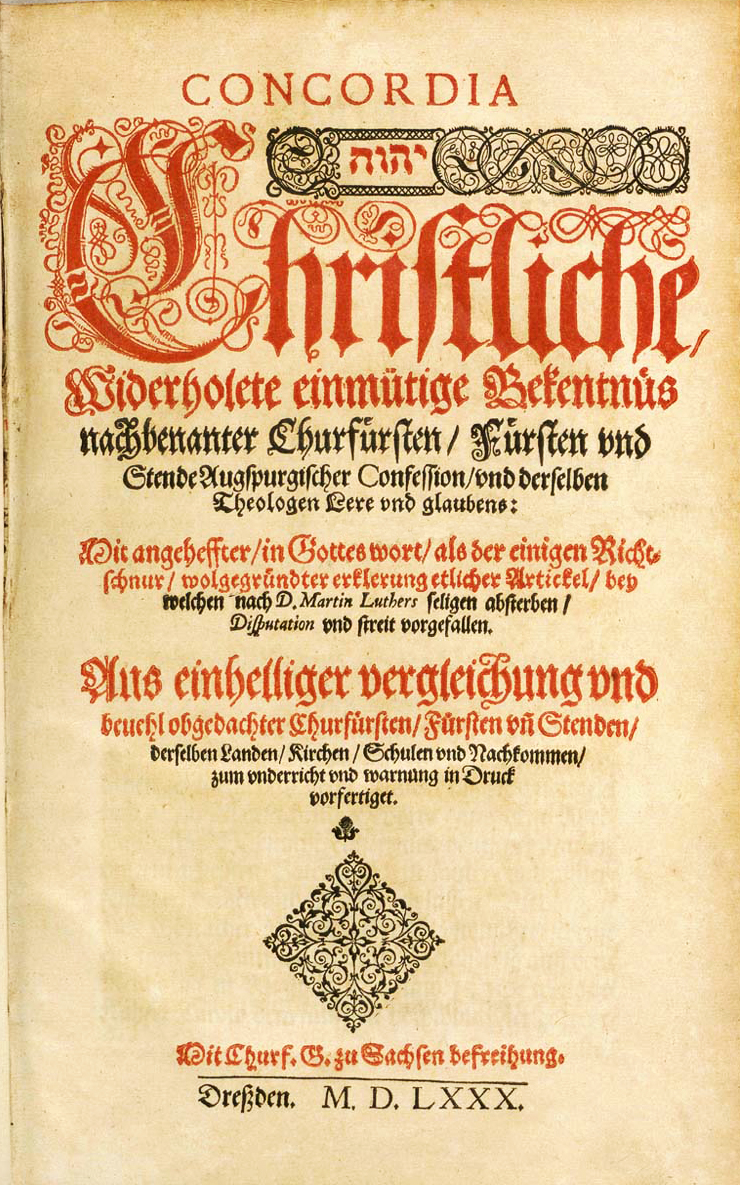
The Book of Concord

A good testimony of Frederick's stubborn resistance to all religious controversy can be found in his response to the late sixteenth-century Lutheran statement of faith, the Formula and Book of Concord. The 'Concord', which was written by leading Saxon divines and sponsored by Frederick II's brother-in-law, Augustus, Elector of Saxony, was an attempt to promote unity among the German Lutheran princes. As a unifier, however, the Concord was an abject failure.

August had recently purged his court of Calvinists and Philippists, and orthodox Lutherans like Jacob Andreae composed the document. The Concord was extremely orthodox. Frederick II had already clashed with his old friend and companion Augustus over theological issues: in 1575, Augustus had complained profoundly about the Calvinist sentiments expounded by Niels Hemmingsen in the treatise Syntagma institutionum christianarum (1574). Though Frederick tried to defend Hemmingsen, who was his favourite divine, he also wanted to keep Augustus' friendship, and he therefore dismissed Hemmingsen – with honour – from his post at the University of Copenhagen in 1579. Frederick was not nearly so receptive to August's promotion of the Concord.

Like many other contemporaries of his time, Frederick believed that the Book of Concord promoted discord, and not harmony. Ignoring Augustus's warnings that a Calvinist plot had taken root in Denmark's clergy, he banned the Concord from his lands in July 1580. Possession of the book, or even discussion of its contents, would be punished severely. The king burned his own personal copies, which were sent to him by his sister Anne, wife of Augustus. The Concord, he argued, contained "teachings which are foreign and alien to us and to our churches, [and which] could easily disrupt the unity which ... these kingdoms have hitherto maintained".

=== Marriage Ordinance ===
Frederick II's 'Marriage Ordinance' of 1582, inspired by Niels Hemmingsen's writings on the institution, allowed divorce for a wide range of reasons, including infidelity, impotence, leprosy, venereal disease, and outlawry.

== Areas of interest ==
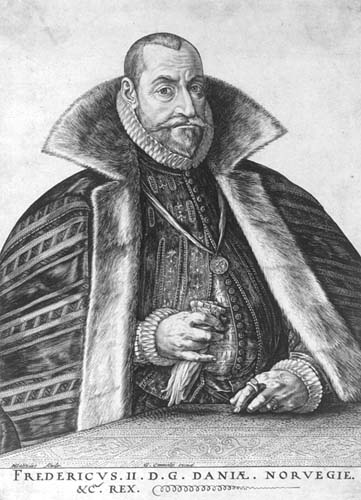
Frederick II in his later years.

=== University of Copenhagen ===
Frederick was a great patron of the University of Copenhagen, where he introduced educational reforms in the 1570s and 1580s. Frederick increased the university's budget almost exponentially, expanding the size of its teaching staff and providing substantially higher salaries. While demanding higher educational standards from the priesthood, Frederick and his advisers provided more support for impoverished students. One hundred students, selected by the faculty, received room and board free of fee from the crown, each for a period of five years. Four especially promising students would be awarded the stipendium regium, which paid all costs for study abroad so long as the recipient returned to Copenhagen to finish his doctorate.

=== Medicine ===
The interests of Frederick II and his intellectual circle of wise men were more wide-ranging than that of his father's theological one. Frederick had a strong proclivity for Paracelsian medicine: in 1571 he appointed Johannes Pratensis to the medical faculty of the University of Copenhagen, and in the same year Petrus Severinus became his personal physician. Severinus wielded considerable influence among Paracelsian practitioners, following the publication of his Idea medicinæ philosophicæ (1571).

=== Alchemy, astrology and Tycho Brahe ===
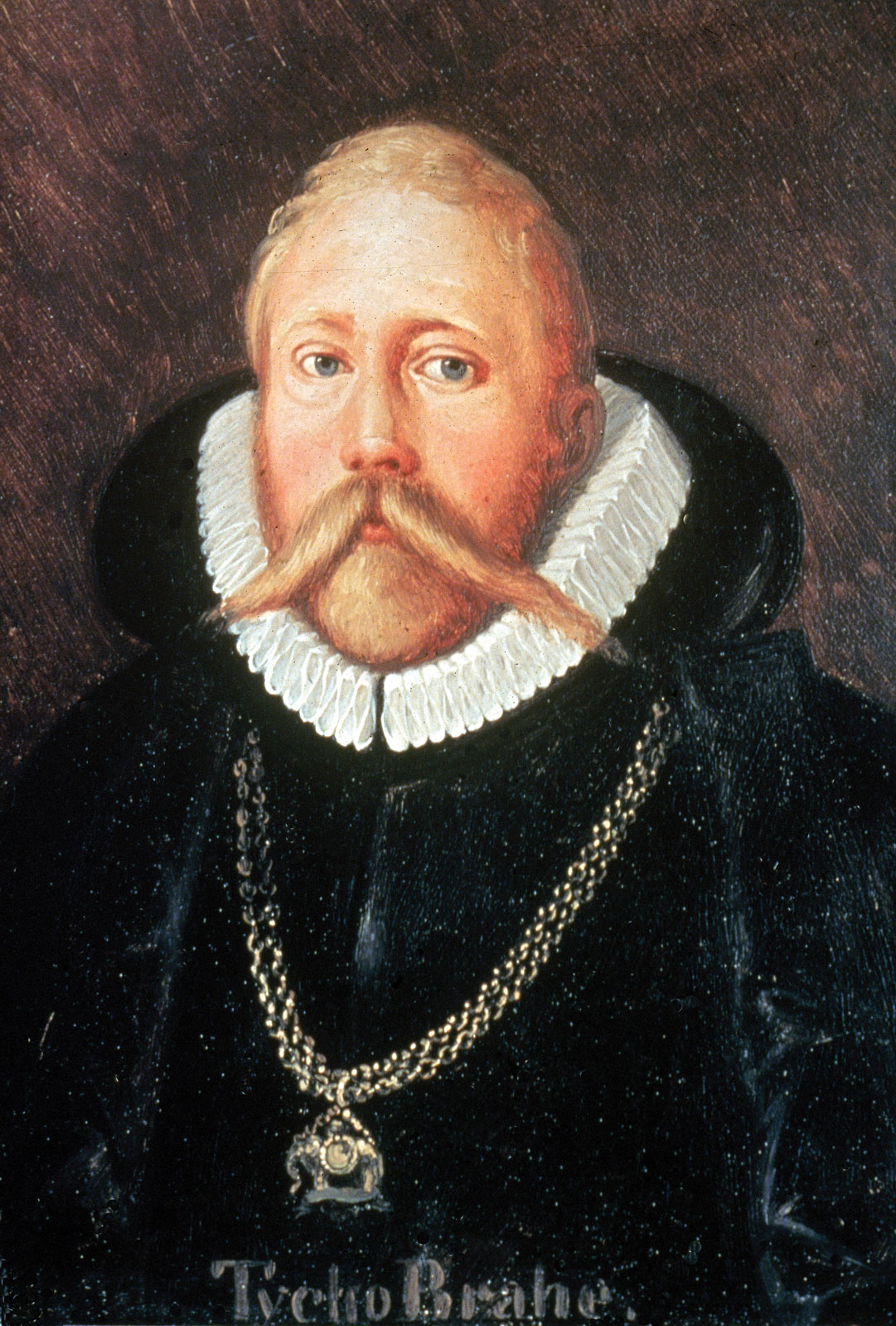
Tycho Brahe

Frederick II's fascination with alchemy and astrology, common to contemporary sovereigns, sped the rise of the astronomer Tycho Brahe to international renown as a pioneer in Europe's Scientific Revolution. Tycho Brahe came from the highest ranks of the Danish ruling elite: his father, Otte Brahe til Knudstrup, was a fiefholder in Scania and a member of the Council of the Realm, as was Tycho’s brother Axel Brahe.

After an extensive education abroad, Tycho Brahe returned to Denmark not to pursue a career in state service as men of his blood typically did, but instead retreated to the monastery at Herrevad, where he and his maternal uncle Sten Bille experimented with the manufacture of paper and glass and maintained a private observatory. Brahe's treatise on the supernova that appeared in Cassiopeia in November 1572, published at the behest of the rigshofmester Peder Oxe, brought his activities to the attention of Frederick and his court. At the king's insistence, Brahe took up a lectureship at the University of Copenhagen in 1574, and two years later he was granted the island of Ven as his fief. As a fiefholder, he turned out to be a minor disaster, but the observatory at his residence, Uraniborg, drew students from all over Europe. From 1576 until his expulsion by Christian IV in 1597, Brahe supervised the first publicly funded scientific research institute in European history.

=== Character as patron of science ===
In his later life, Frederick was fiscally cautious in all matters of state, but he gave an abundance of royal support when it was directed towards the life of the mind. Even after he dismissed Hemmingsen from the University of Copenhagen in 1579, for example, he made sure that the theologian still had a gracious salary and the opportunity to study. Tycho Brahe received not only Ven as a 'free fief', but also several other fiefs, canonries, and farms in Scania to fund his work at Uraniborg.

Frederick himself picked out the island of Ven as a place where Brahe could conduct his experiments without distraction. Perhaps the king was driven, in part, by a desire to enhance Denmark's reputation among the great nations of Europe, but even so he demonstrated a finely tuned appreciation for intellectual talent.

As Frederick is alleged to have said to Brahe:

I will sail over to the island [Hven] from time to time and see your work in astronomy and chemistry, and gladly support your investigations, not because I have any understanding of astronomical matters ... but because I am your king and you my subject ... . I see it as my duty to support and promote something like this

— Frederick II to Tycho Brahe

=== Hunting, drinking and feasting ===
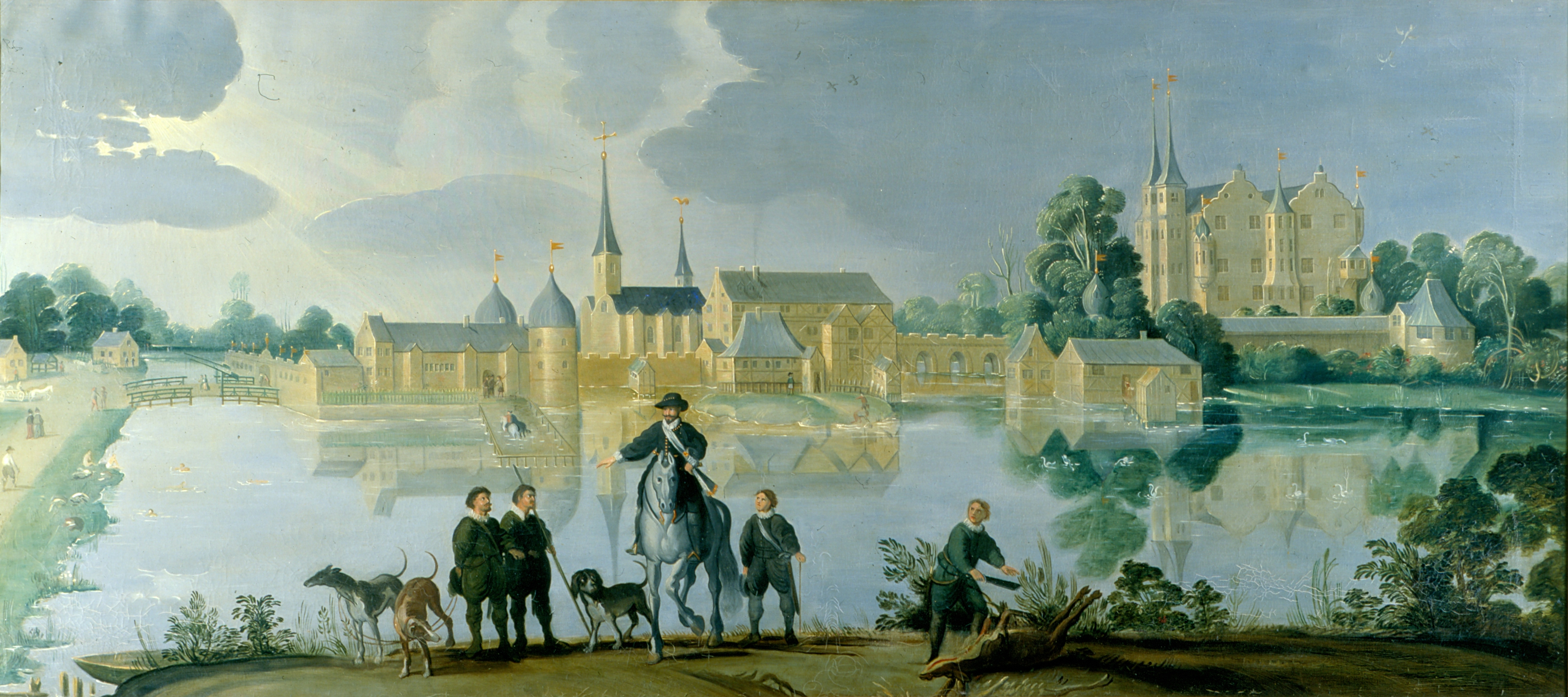
Hillerødsholm Castle (later Frederiksborg Castle) one of Frederick's favourite hunting-castles. Painting at Gripsholm Castle.

Frederick's areas of interest did not consist only of theological and scientific ones. Frederick is known very well for his love of hunting, drinking and feasting. In his youth and in the start of his reign this was a way for Frederick to get away from the Danish court and its formalities. However, in Frederick's later reign he began using hunting and feasting as a political tool. In the peacetime years of his reign, Frederick would maintain a peripatetic court, moving from residence to residence throughout the Danish countryside, spending a fair share of his time hunting. This allowed him the opportunity to meet members of the Council individually and informally, in their own home regions. Most of his business with the Council of the Realm was therefor done on a one-to-one basis. This ensured a very close personal bond with each member of the council while minimizing the opportunity for the council to oppose him as a body. Frederick's personable disposition undoubtedly helped.

==== Informal nature of court life ====
The king hunted, feasted, and drank with his councillors and advisers, and even with visiting European foreign dignitaries, treating them as his peers and companions rather than as political opponents or inferiors. The eighteenth-century chronicler Ludvig Holberg claimed that when dining at the court of Frederick II, he would frequently announce that 'the king is not at home', which signalled to his guests that all court formalities were temporarily suspended, and that they could talk and joke as they pleased without restraint. The Danish court may have appeared unsophisticated to outside observers, but the openness and bawdiness of court life served Frederick's political purposes.

== Youth and marriage ==
=== Anne Hardenberg ===
As a young man, Frederick II had desired to marry the noblewoman, Anne Hardenberg, who had served as a lady-in-waiting to his mother, the Dowager Queen Dorothea of Denmark, however as she was not of princely birth, this was impossible. There is no evidence that either of them had any interest in entering a morganatic marriage and Anne Hardenberg was married six months after Frederick, after which there is no known contact between them.

=== Possible matrimonies ===
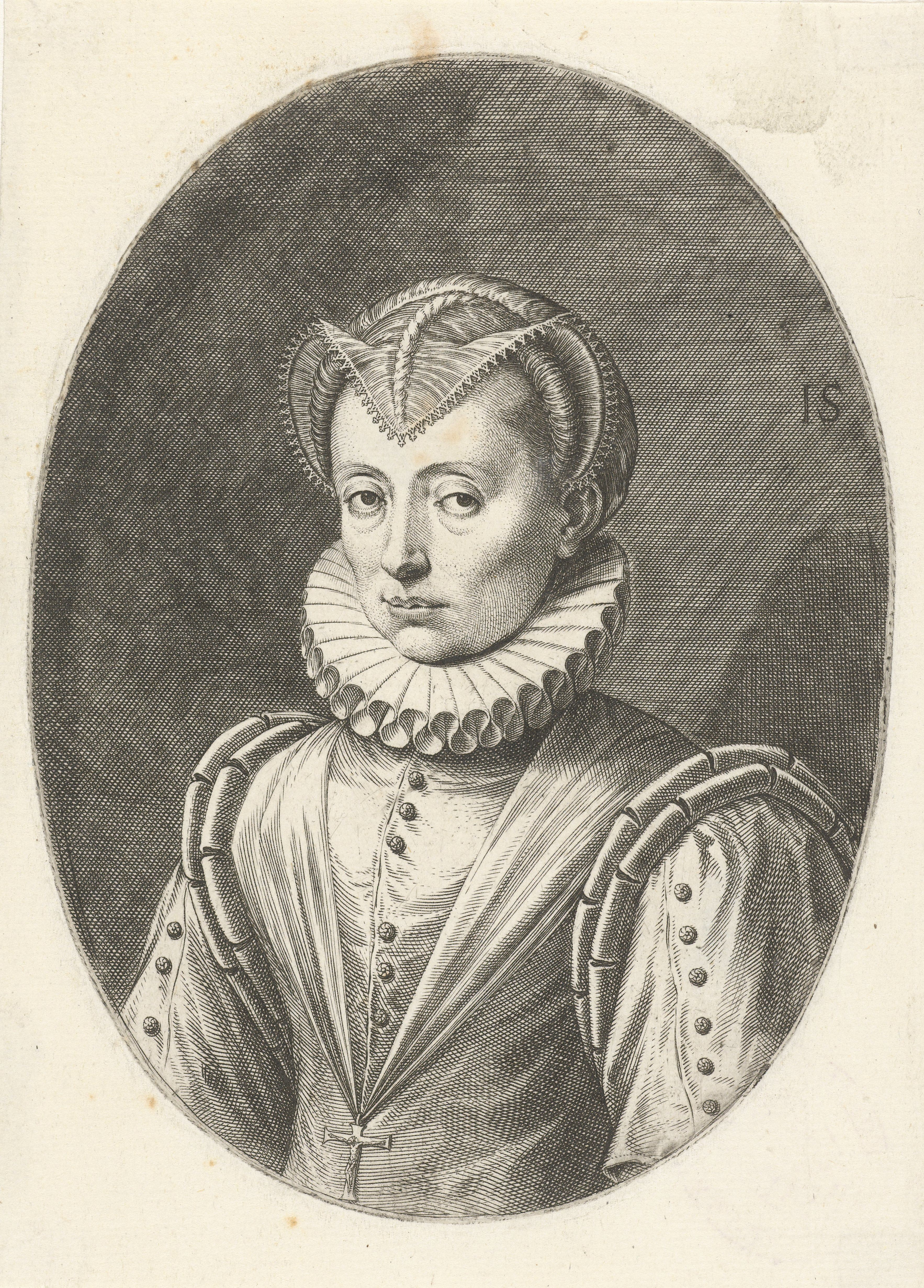
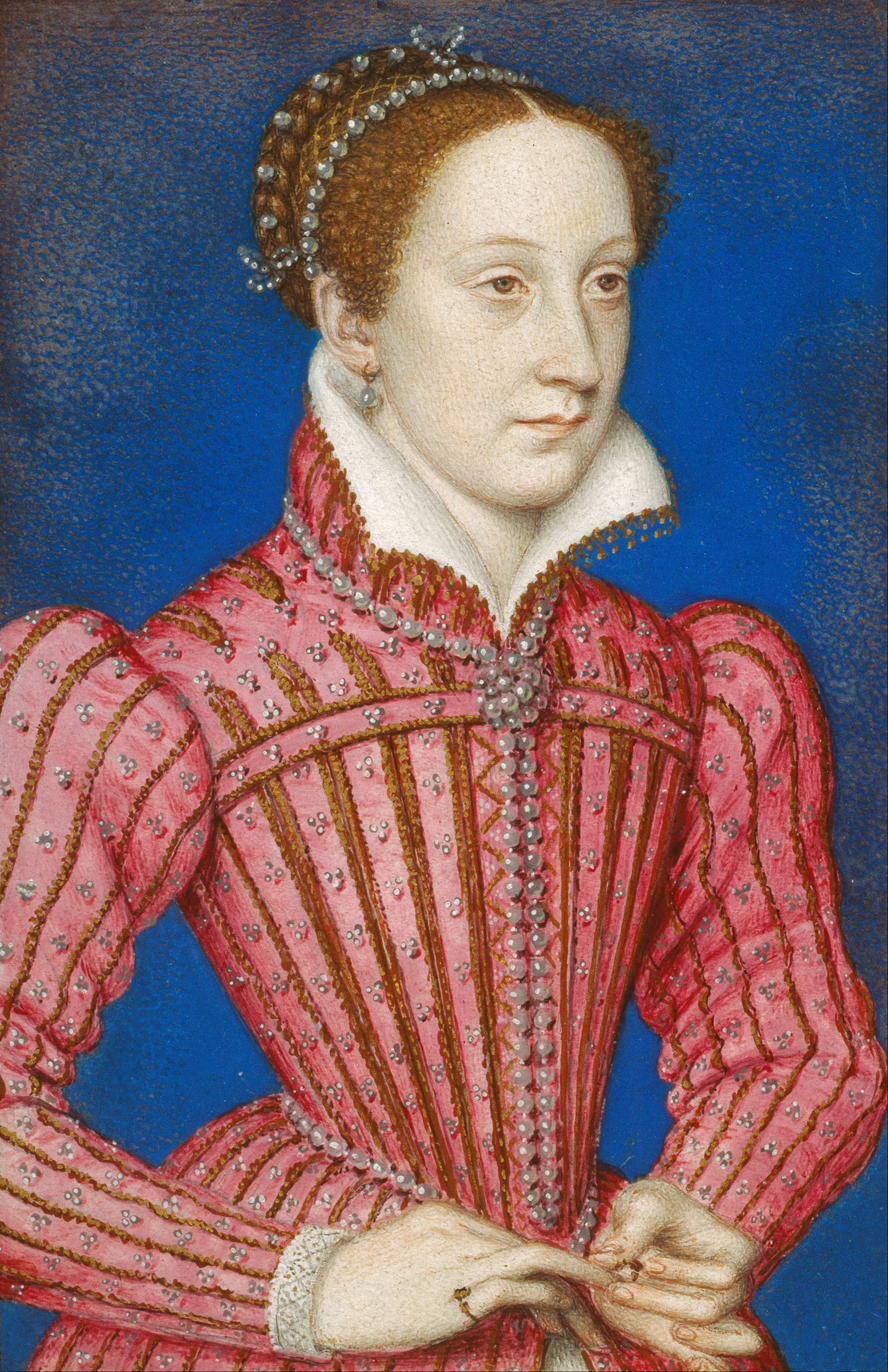
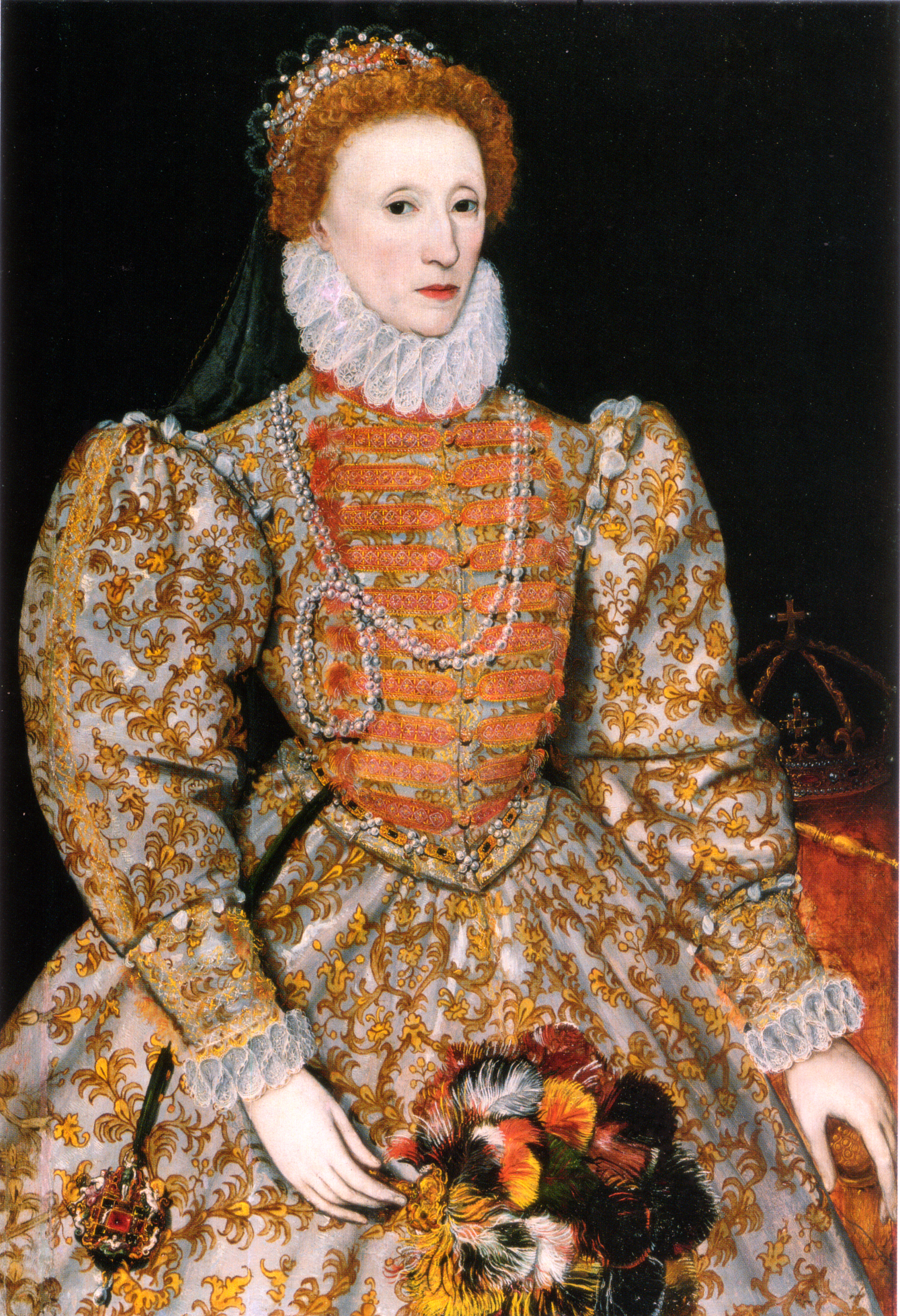
Renata of Lorraine (left) Mary, Queen of Scots (middle) and Elizabeth I (right)

Negotiations to find a suitable royal bride were manifold during the 1560s, but mostly it came to nothing, often because Frederick strongly insisted on meeting the prospective bride before committing to her. The proposed matrimonies included:

- Renata of Lorraine: Throughout the 1550s, Frederick's father Christian III strongly advocated a marriage alliance with the House of Lorraine, hoping that a match between his son Prince Frederick and claimant to the Danish throne Christina of Denmark's daughter Renata, would settle the claimant disputes, and possibly even add Lorraine to the Oldenburg patrimony. The match never took place—Frederick was indifferent to it, many of the king's advisers opposed it, and Christina was none too cooperative – but it remained Christian III's fervent hope to the end of his days.
- Juliana of Nassau: Throughout the 1560s, a marriage between Frederick and William of Orange's sister, Juliana, was heavily considered. Frederick and the Danish Council of State wanted to strengthen relations with other Protestant powers, and the relationship between Frederick and William was very positive, and they kept close confidential correspondence right up until Frederick's death. The marriage failed due to high political complications, as Frederick did not want to appear as an obvious supporter of one of Spain's enemies.
- Mary Stuart, Queen of Scots.
- He had also wooed Queen Elizabeth I of England, but to no avail, and was later made a Knight of the Garter.
- A daughter of Emperor Ferdinand I.
- A daughter of Albert V, Duke of Bavaria.
- Margaret of Pomerania: Frederick's aunt Elizabeth of Denmark, introduced Frederick to the 17-years-old Margaret of Pomerania, but Frederick was instead interested in Elizabeth's daughter Sophie.

=== Marriage to Sophie of Mecklenburg-Güstrow ===
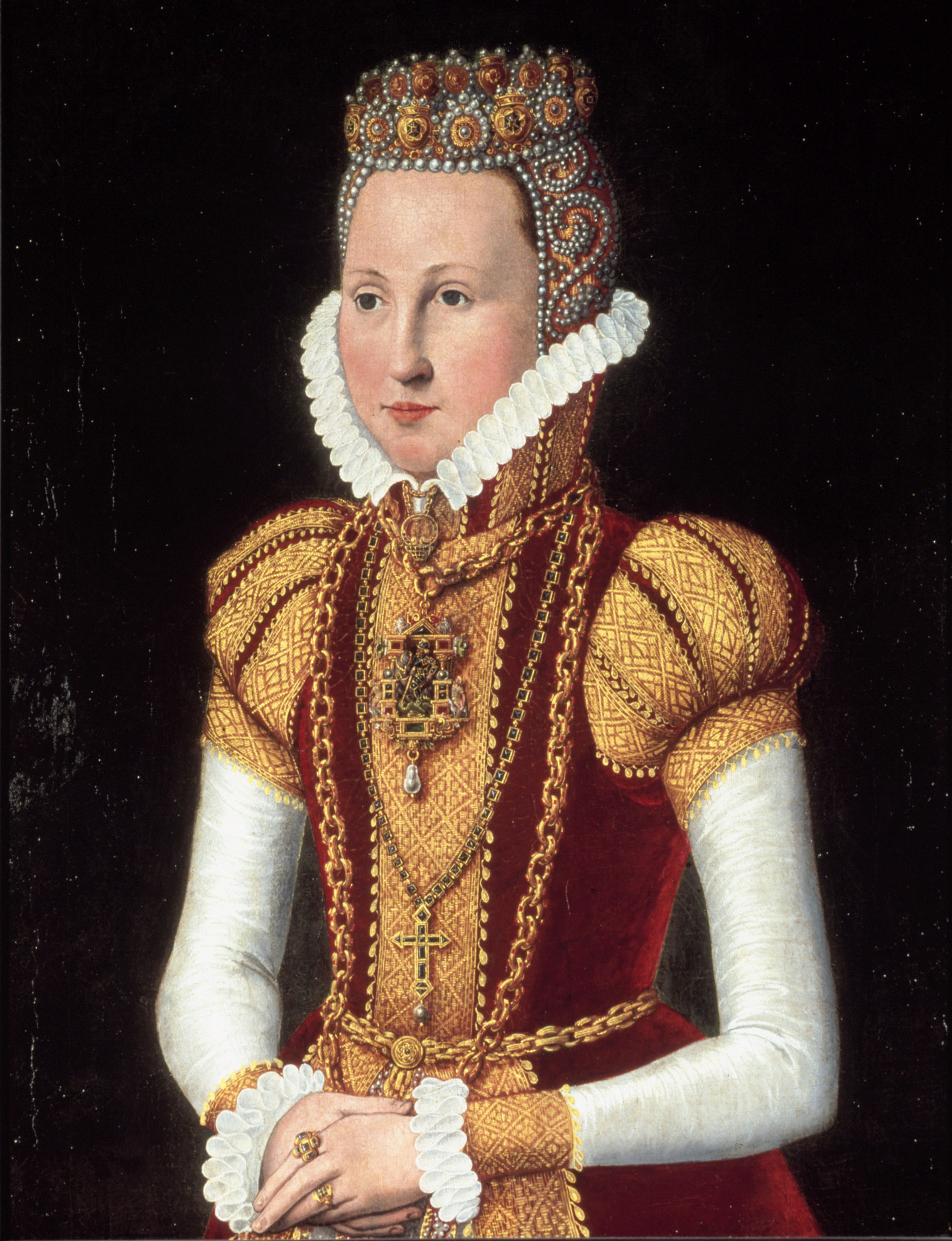
Wife of Frederick II, Sophie of Mecklenburg-Güstrow

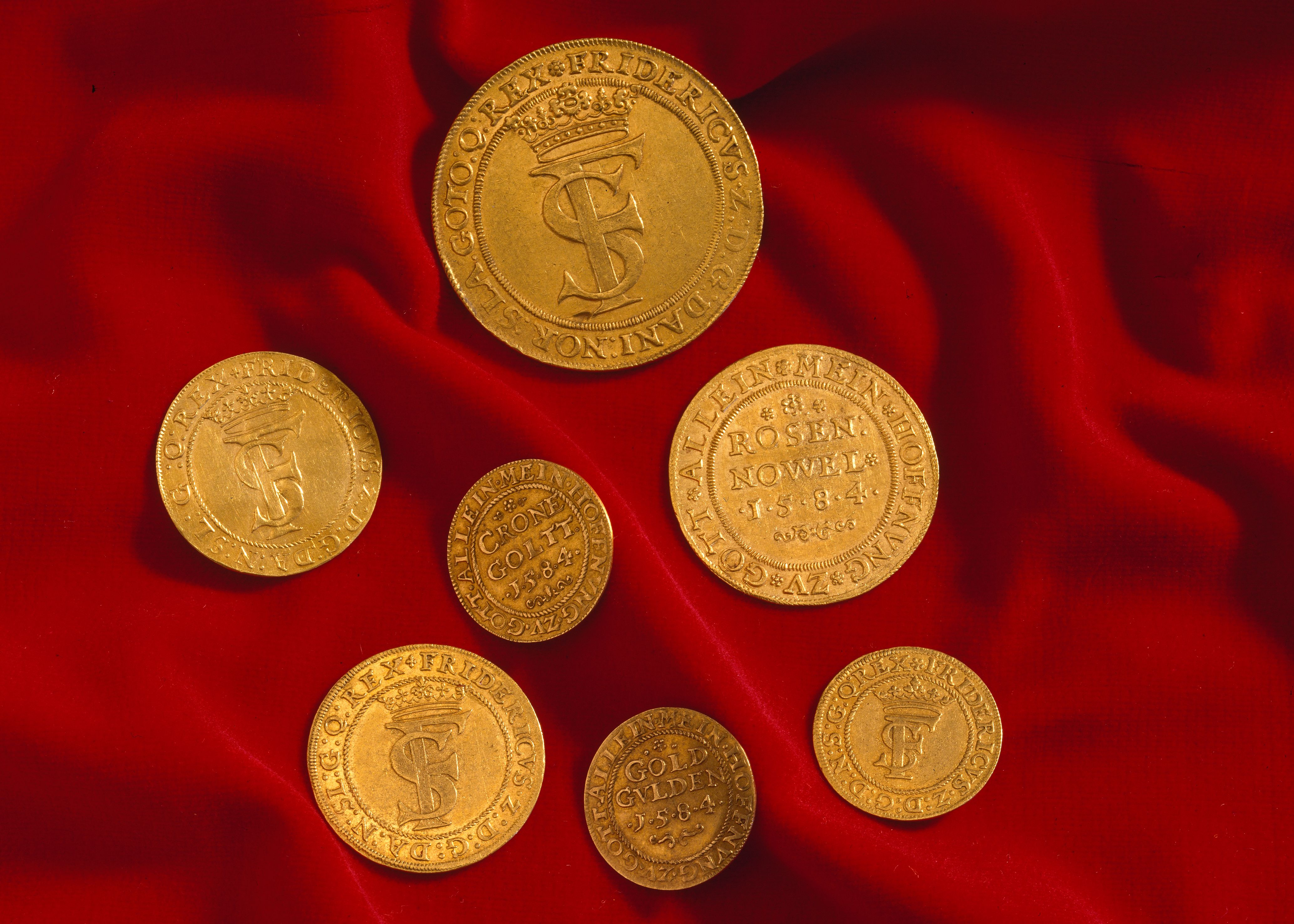
Gold coins minted during the reign of Frederick II. "Queen Sophjie's Gift Set".

On 20 July 1572, he was married to Sophie of Mecklenburg-Güstrow, a descendant of King John of Denmark, and also his own first half-cousin, through their grandfather, Frederick I, King of Denmark and Norway.

Sophie was the daughter of Ulrich III, Duke of Mecklenburg-Güstrow and Elizabeth of Denmark. Their marriage was harmonious and happy. Sophie is consistently mentioned in Frederick's handwritten diary as "mynt Soffye", meaning "my Sophie" and she followed him through the country as the court was very mobile. Queen Sophie was a loving mother, nursing her children personally during their illnesses. When Frederick was sick with malaria in 1575, she personally nursed him and wrote many worried letters to her father about his progress.

After Frederick's death Sophie was granted a life estate or 'Dowager-pension' (Danish: Livgeding), consisting of Nykøbing Castle and the islands of Lolland and Falster. The Dowager Queen Sophie managed her estates in Lolland-Falster so well that her son could borrow money from her on several occasions for his wars.

== Issue ==
Frederick and Sophie had seven children:

Name	Portrait	Birth	Death	Notes
Elizabeth of Denmark		25 August 1573	19 June 1625	She married on 19 April 1590 Henry Julius, Duke of Brunswick-Lüneburg. They had 10 children.
Anne of Denmark		12 December 1574	2 March 1619	She married on 23 November 1589 King James VI of Scotland (later also King James I of England). They had 7 children.
Christian IV, King of Denmark and Norway		12 April 1577	28 February 1648	He married firstly on 27 November 1597 Anne Catherine of Brandenburg. They had 7 children. He married secondly, morganatically, Kirsten Munk. They had 12 children. Christian had at least 5 other illegitimate children.
Ulrik of Denmark		30 December 1578	27 March 1624	He became last Bishop of the old Schleswig see (1602–1624), He became Ulrich II as Administrator of the Prince-Bishopric of Schwerin (1603–1624). He married Lady Catherine Hahn-Hinrichshagen.
Augusta of Denmark		8 April 1580	5 February 1639	She married on 30 August 1596 John Adolf, Duke of Holstein-Gottorp. They had 8 children.
Hedwig of Denmark		5 August 1581	26 November 1641	She married on 12 September 1602 Christian II, Elector of Saxony. The marriage was childless.
John of Denmark, Prince of Schleswig-Holstein		9 July 1583	28 October 1602	He was betrothed to Tsarevna Ksenia (Xenia) daughter of Boris Godunov, Tsar of Russia, but died before the marriage could take place.

== Death and burial ==
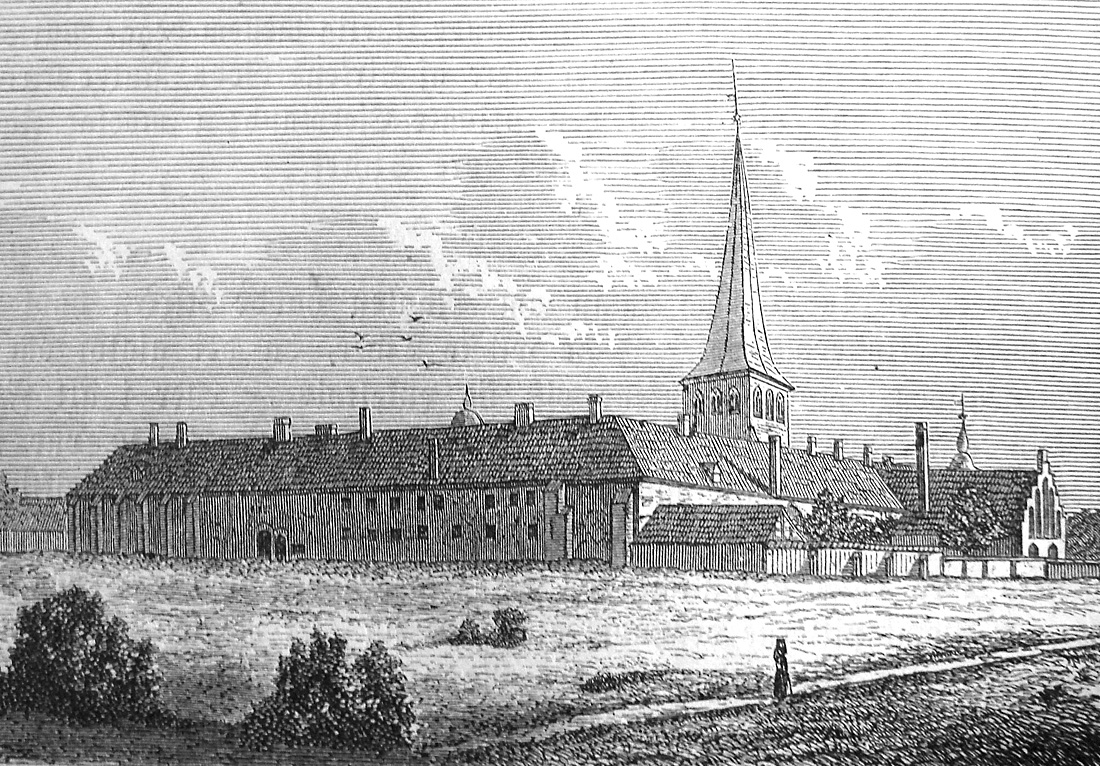
Antvorskov where King Frederick II of Denmark died.

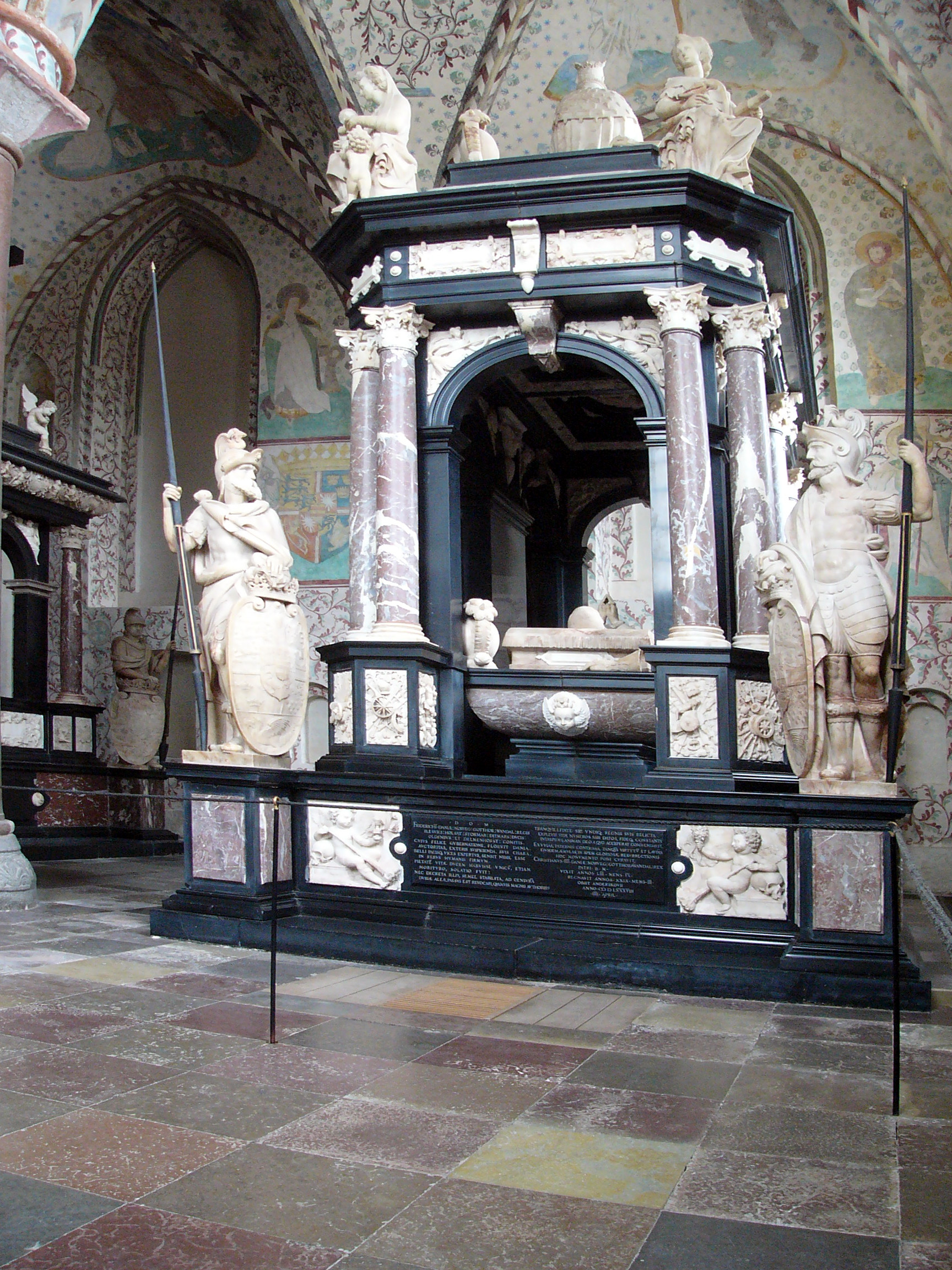
Sepulchral monument of Frederick II by Gert van Egen in the Christian I's Chapel (Chapel of the Magi).

King Frederick II died on 4 April 1588, aged 53, at Antvorskov.

Frederick was buried on 5 August 1588 in Christian I's chapel at Roskilde Cathedral, where his son King Christian IV later built a large monument in honour of his late father.

== Legacy ==
Many recent historians, such as Poul Grinder-Hansen, Paul Douglas Lockhart, Thomas Kingston Derry and Frede P. Jensen have expressed, that it is difficult to see how the reign, and especially the later reign, of Frederick II could be viewed as anything other than a resounding success. Frederick's character have throughout time been interpreted by Danish historians as unlettered, foolish and stupid; leaving state affairs to his councillors to go hunting in the countryside.

However, Frederick craved the company of learned men, who composed his inner circle of intellectuals, and they had many interests, including medicine, alchemy, astrology and theology. As Paul Douglas Lockhart later stated: "Frederik II may have been a near illiterate (...) but nonetheless he was enlightened as few monarchs of his generation were. It is difficult to see how Danish historians for so long laboured under the impression that he was little better than a drunken fool".

=== Classical and more recent portrayal ===
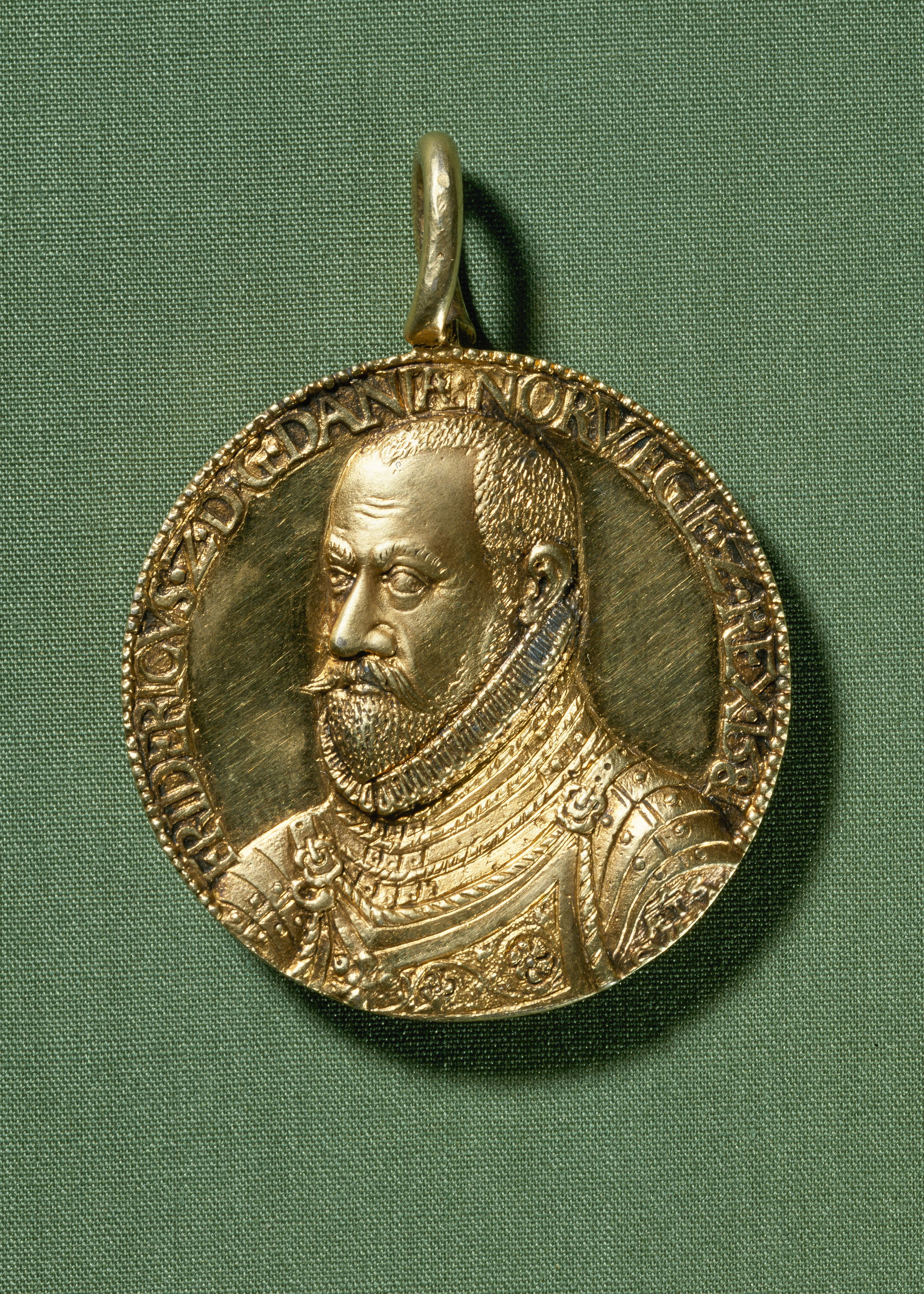
Frederick II depicted on a medal, 1581

The negative portrayal of Frederick II was founded by the cultural historian Troels Frederik Lund in his 1906 biography of Peder Oxe, who in his opinion saved Denmark on the brink of abyss against the foolhardy young king and his German war-mad officers. This portrayal was continued by Erik Arup, who wrote:

He (Frederick II) was robust and brutal, so hotheaded and gross in his whole way that it was striking even for his contemporaries. His penchant for overestimating himself and underestimating everyone else was a profound feature of him that made him highly ungracious and unlovable

— Erik Arup

Often described as wilful and impatient, he was easily moved to anger, and by his early twenties had exhibited a weakness for strong drink and an addiction to the hunt. These are the traits upon which Danish historians have most often focused, resulting in the prevailing portrait of Frederick as a man and as king: an unlettered, inebriated, brutish sot, who virtually abdicated his responsibilities of king in favour of hunting and binge drinking.

Frede P. Jensen (1940–2008), after thorough archival studies, was one of the first historians in Denmark who, in his works, radically changed the view of the King Frederick II.

Frederick was indeed no great scholar, owing largely to the fact that he was very dyslexic. Throughout his entire life he would struggle with his difficulty in reading and writing, and it embarrassed him immensely. But he was, as those close to him would attest, highly intelligent, and in the correspondence and legislation he dictated to his secretaries he showed himself to be quick-witted and articulate. Frederick was also open and loyal, and had a knack for establishing close personal bonds with fellow princes and with those who served him. These qualities would make him an ideal politician. Indeed, Frederick would take the chief legacy of his father's kingship – the close symbiosis between king and aristocracy – to its logical limits, and simultaneously would bring Denmark to the height of its power and influence in European affairs.

The rebirth of the University of Copenhagen and the professionalization of the central administration, coupled with the prominence of learned men within the king's inner circle, gave the court of Frederick II a uniquely refined and scholarly character that was lacking in his father's court. This, in turn, gave rise to increased intellectual activity throughout the realm. Literature, mostly theological, blossomed in the second half of the century.

== Title, style, honours and arms ==
=== Titles and styles ===
- 1554 – 1 January 1559 (While in Scania ): Frederick, Prince of Scania
- 1 January 1559 – 4 April 1588: By the Grace of God, King of Denmark and Norway, the Wends and the Goths, Duke of Schleswig, Holstein, Stormarn and Dithmarschen, Count of Oldenburg and Delmenhorst.

=== Orders ===
- Summer 1561 – 4 April 1588: (Kingdom of France) Order of Saint Michael
- April 1579 – 4 April 1588: (England) Order of the Garter

=== Coat of Arms ===
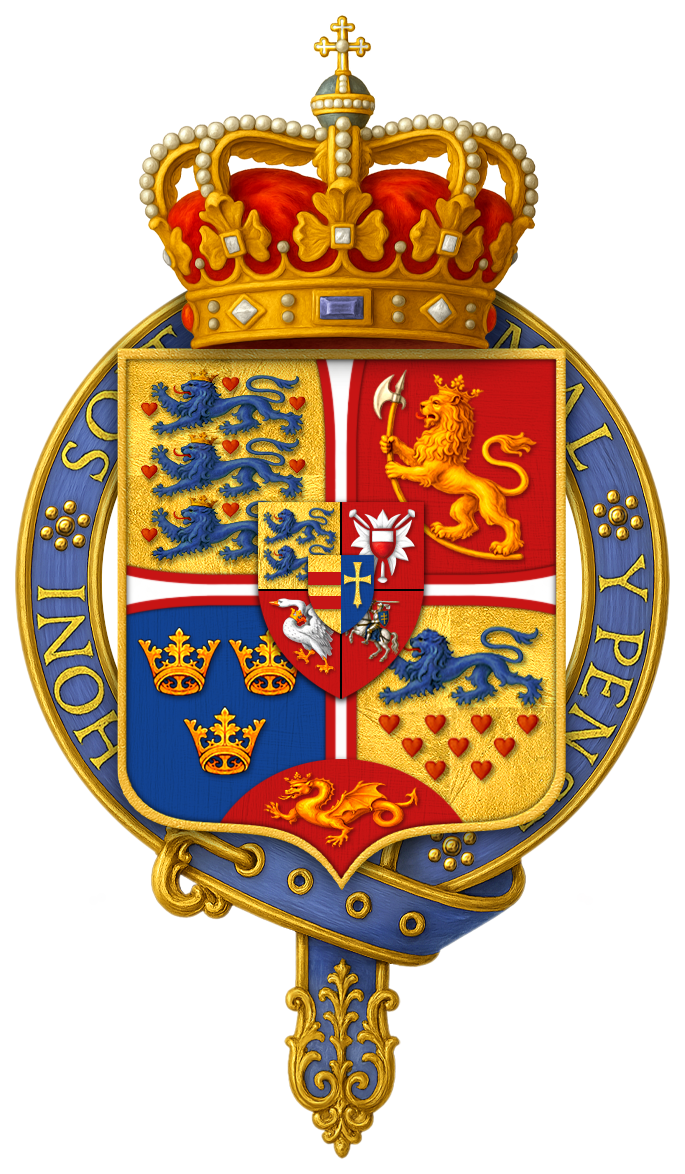
Coat of arms of Frederick as King of Denmark and Norway.	Coat of arms of Frederick as Knight of the Order of the Garter.

== Ancestry ==
Ancestors of Frederick II of Denmark

8. Christian I of Denmark
4. Frederick I of Denmark
9. Dorothea of Brandenburg
2. Christian III of Denmark
10. John Cicero, Elector of Brandenburg
5. Anna of Brandenburg
11. Margaret of Thuringia
1. Frederick II of Denmark
12. John V, Duke of Saxe-Lauenburg
6. Magnus I, Duke of Saxe-Lauenburg
13. Dorothea of Brandenburg
3. Dorothea of Saxe-Lauenburg
14. Henry IV, Duke of Brunswick-Lüneburg
7. Catherine of Brunswick-Wolfenbüttel
15. Catherine of Pomerania-Wolgast

== Bibliography ==
- Derry, T. K. (2008). A history of Scandinavia: Norway, Sweden, Denmark, Finland and Iceland. Minneapolis: University of Minnesota Press. ISBN 978-0-8166-3799-7. OCLC 757764817.
- Grinder-Hansen, Poul (2013). Frederik 2.: Danmarks renæssancekonge [Frederick II: Denmark's Renaissance King]. [Copenhagen]: Gyldendal. ISBN 978-87-02-08108-4. OCLC 859151055.
- Lockhart, Paul Douglas (2011). Denmark, 1513–1660: the rise and decline of a Renaissance monarchy. Oxford University Press. ISBN 978-0-19-927121-4. OCLC 844083309.
- Scocozza, Benito (1997). "Frederik 2.". Politikens bog om danske monarker [Politiken's book about Danish monarchs] (in Danish). Copenhagen: Politikens Forlag. pp. 120–124. ISBN 87-567-5772-7.
- Lockhart, Paul (2004). Frederik II and the Protestant Cause. Boston: Brill.

Frederick II House of Oldenburg Born: 1 July 1534 Died: 4 April 1588
Regnal titles
Preceded by Christian III	King of Denmark and Norway; 1559–1588	Succeeded by Christian IV
Preceded by Christian III; John II the Elder and Adolf (in condominial rule)	Duke of Holstein and Schleswig; 1559–1588 with John II (1559–1580); Adolf (1559–1586); Frederick II (1586–1587); Philip (1587–1588)	Succeeded by Christian IV and Philip
