= Emperor Frederick III =

Emperor Frederick III may refer to:

- Frederick III, Holy Roman Emperor (1415–1493)
- Frederick III, German Emperor (1831–1888)

== See also ==
- Frederick III (disambiguation)
