= Freddie Williams =

Freddie Williams may refer to:

- Frederic C. Williams (1911–1977), English engineer
- Freddie Williams (speedway rider) (1926–2013), motorcycle speedway world champion
- Freddie Williams II (born 1977), comics artist
- Freddie Williams (businessman) (1942–2008), Scottish bookmaker
- Freddie Williams (runner) (born 1962), Canadian track and field runner
- Freddie Williams (Canadian football) (1955–2014), football player

== See also ==
- Fred Williams (disambiguation)
- Frederick Williams (disambiguation)
- Freddye Harper Williams, American newspaper columnist, management analyst, and state legislator in Oklahoma
