= Frederick William I =

Frederick William I (German: Friedrich Wilhelm I) may refer to:

- Frederick William I, Duke of Saxe-Weimar (1562–1602)
- Frederick William, the Great Elector, of Brandenburg-Prussia (1620–1688)
- Frederick William I, Duke of Schleswig-Holstein-Sonderburg-Beck (1682–1719)
- Frederick William I of Prussia (1688–1740)
- Frederick William, Elector of Hesse (1802–1875)

== See also ==
- Frederick William (disambiguation)
- Friedrich Wilhelm (disambiguation)
