= Friedrich Wilhelm =

The German name Friedrich Wilhelm may refer to:

== People ==
=== Hohenzollern kings ===
- Frederick William I of Prussia (1688–1740)
- Frederick William II of Prussia (1744–1797)
- Frederick William III of Prussia (1770–1840)
- Frederick William IV of Prussia (1795–1861)

=== Other nobility ===
- Frederick William, the Great Elector (1620–1688), Duke of Prussia
- Friedrich Wilhelm, Prince of Hohenzollern-Hechingen (1663–1735), imperial Field Marshal
- Friedrich Wilhelm, Duke of Saxe-Meiningen (1679–1746)
- Frederick William, Margrave of Brandenburg-Schwedt (1700–1771)
- Friedrich Wilhelm von Haugwitz (1702–1765), Supreme Chancellor of the United Court Chancery
- Margrave Frederick William of Brandenburg-Schwedt (1715–1744)
- Friedrich Wilhelm, Graf von Wylich und Lottum (1716–1774), Prussian officer and Commandant of Berlin
- Friedrich Wilhelm, Fürst zu Hohenlohe-Kirchberg (1732–1796)
- Friedrich Karl Wilhelm, Fürst zu Hohenlohe (1752–1814)
- Frederick William, Duke of Brunswick-Wolfenbüttel (1771–1815)
- Frederick William, Duke of Schleswig-Holstein-Sonderburg-Glücksburg (1785–1831)
- Friedrich Wilhelm, Count Brandenburg (1792–1850), Prussian general and politician
- Frederick William, Grand Duke of Mecklenburg-Strelitz (1819–1904)
- Prince Frederick William of Hesse-Kassel (1820–1884)
- Friedrich Wilhelm von Hohenzollern, German Crown Prince (1882–1951)
- Friedrich Wilhelm, Prince of Hohenzollern (1924–2010)
- Prince Friedrich Wilhelm of Lippe (born 1947)

=== Other people ===
- Friedrich Wilhelm Argelander (1799–1875), Prussian astronomer
- Friedrich-Wilhelm Graefe zu Baringdorf (born 1942), politician
- Friedrich Wilhelm Bessel (1784–1846), mathematician and astronomer
- Friedrich Wilhelm Freiherr von Bülow (1755–1816), Prussian general
- Friedrich Wilhelm von Buxhoeveden (1759—1811), Russian general
- Friedrich Wilhelm August Fröbel, (1782–1852), educationist
- Friedrich Wilhelm Eduard Gerhard (1795–1867), archaeologist
- Friedrich Wilhelm Gotter (1746–1797), poet
- Friedrich Wilhelm Hackländer (1816–1877), writer
- Friedrich Wilhelm Hemprich (1796–1825), naturalist and explorer
- Friedrich Wilhelm Kalkbrenner (1784–1849), pianist and composer
- Friedrich Wilhelm Kasiski (1805–1881), officer, cryptologist, and archaeologist
- Friedrich Wilhelm Georg Kohlrausch (1840–1910), physicist
- Friedrich Wilhelm Kritzinger (1890–1947), Nazi politician
- Friedrich-Wilhelm Krüger (1894–1945), Nazi officer
- Friedrich Wilhelm Ludwig Leichhardt (1813–1848?), explorer
- Friedrich Wilhelm Murnau (1888–1931), silent film director
- Friedrich Wilhelm Nietzsche (1844–1900), philologist and philosopher
- Friedrich Wilhelm Raiffeisen (1818–1888), cooperative leader
- Friedrich Wilhelm Ritschl (1806–1876), scholar
- Friedrich Wilhelm Rüstow (1821–1878), Swiss soldier
- Friedrich Wilhelm Schadow (1789–1862), painter
- Friedrich Wilhelm Joseph Schelling (1775–1854), philosopher
- Friedrich Wilhelm Schirmer (1802–1866), artist
- Friedrich Wilhelm Schneidewin (1810–1856), classicist
- Friedrich Wilhelm von Seydlitz (1721–1773), Prussian cavalry general
- Friedrich Wilhelm von Steuben (1730–1794), Prussian officer
- Friedrich Wilhelm Thiersch (1784–1860), educationist
- Friedrich Wilhelm Zachow (1663–1712), composer

== Other uses ==
- SMS Kurfürst Friedrich Wilhelm, Imperial German ship
- Friedrich-Wilhelms-Universität, an older name of the Humboldt University of Berlin
- Rheinische Friedrich-Wilhelms-Universität zu Bonn am Rhein, the German name of the University of Bonn

== See also ==
- Frederick William (disambiguation)
- Frederick William I (disambiguation)
