= Fred Williams (lawyer) =

American attorney (1922–2020)

Frederick Douglas Williams
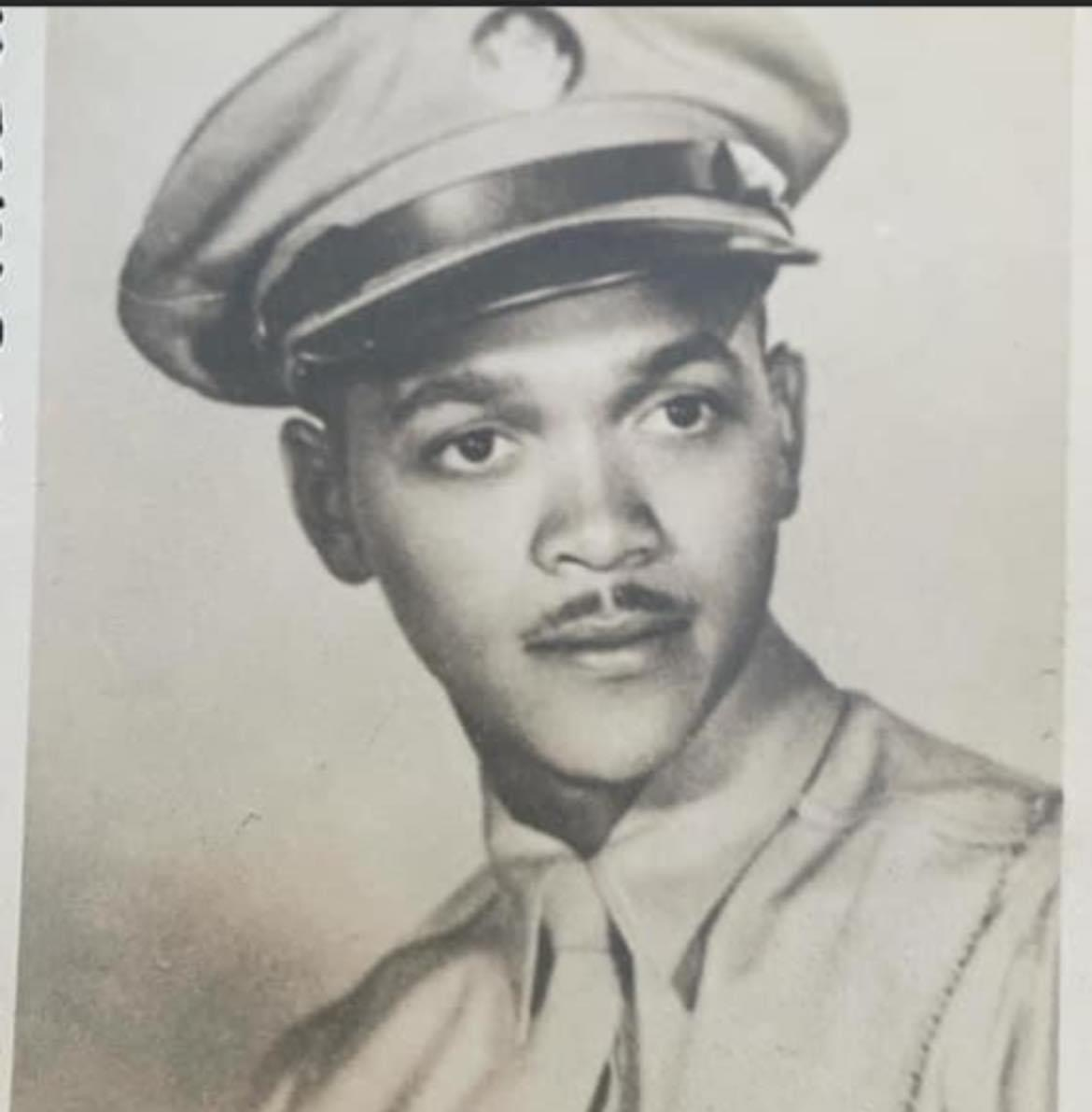
- Born: July 6, 1922
- Died: November 7, 2020 (aged 98)
- Occupations: Pilot, lawyer, politician
- Known for: Military and legal career

Frederick Douglas Williams (July 6, 1922 – November 7, 2020) was an American attorney, civil rights activist, military veteran, and city councilman. He was the first Black attorney to practice law in Maine and served as the president of the Maine State Bar Association. Williams was a former member of the Tuskegee Airmen and later fought in the Korean War.

== Early life and education ==
Williams was born on July 6, 1922, in New York City to Quince Williams and Florence Spann. He grew up in New York, where he attended high school in upper Manhattan. After completing his secondary education, Williams joined the United States Army Air Corps, becoming a cadet with the Tuskegee Airmen, the first Black military aviators in the US armed forces.

Following his service in World War II and the Korean War, Williams used the GI Bill to pursue higher education. He attended the City College of New York, later earning a law degree from New York Law School.

== Military service ==
During World War II, Williams served as an administrator in the US Army Air Corps in Florida and other southern states. He also was a pilot for the Tuskegee Airmen. He was later recalled to service during the Korean War. After his discharge, Williams returned to New York City, where he resumed his education and began his professional career.

== Legal career ==
Williams began his legal career practicing real-estate law in New York City. In 1969, after moving to Maine, he became the first Black lawyer in the state. He initially worked as an attorney for Casco Bank before founding his own private practice. He served as President of the Maine State Bar Association and taught business law at Saint Joseph's College of Maine in Standish, Maine.

== Activism ==
Williams was involved in civil rights and community service throughout his life. He participated in the civil rights movement, including the Selma to Montgomery marches. Williams additionally worked as a US Department of the Treasury agent. He was active in the community of Windham, Maine, where he served as Democrat on the town council beginning in 1971. In the 1996 election, Williams unsuccessfully challenged Republican incumbent for Maine Senate District 26 and Senate president Jeffrey Butland, receiving 41.57% of the vote. He also held a position as a selectman and was an active member of the Windham Lions Club, later becoming a district governor for Lions Clubs International.

== Personal life and legacy ==
Frederick Williams and his wife, Laura, raised four sons—Manuel, Frederick II, Keith, and Kenneth—two of which also went on to serve in the Army. Laura died in 1988. In his later years, Williams resided at the Maine Veterans Home in Scarborough, Maine. Frederick Williams died of natural causes on November 7, 2020.

== See also ==
- Macon Bolling Allen
- Eugene B. Jackson
