= Frederik II Upper Secondary School =

Coordinates: 59°13′25″N 10°55′32″E

- Frederik II videregående skole

Location
- Merkurveien 2 Fredrikstad 1613; Norway

Information
- Established: 1. August 1997
- Rector: Leif Østli
- Enrollment: 1 277 students
- Website: https://frederikii.vgs.no/

Frederik II Videregående skole is the name of an upper secondary school located in the Norwegian city of Fredrikstad. The school is named after the Danish-Norwegian king Frederik II(1534-1588). The school is, with more than 1,200 students, one of the largest schools of its kind in Norway.
