= Frederick Dickinson Williams =

American painter

Frederick Dickinson Williams (1829–1915) was an American landscape artist. He had studied at the Harvard University and started his career as a school arts teacher.
