= Frederick III =

Frederick III may refer to:

- Frederick III, Duke of Upper Lorraine (died 1033)
- Frederick III, Duke of Swabia (1122–1190)
- Friedrich III, Burgrave of Nuremberg (1220–1297)
- Frederick III, Duke of Lorraine (1240–1302)
- Frederick III of Sicily (1272–1337), also known as Frederick II of Sicily
- Frederick III of Germany (1289–1330), nicknamed the Fair, King of the Romans and previously Duke Frederick I of Austria
- Frederick III, Margrave of Baden-Baden (1327–1353)
- Frederick III, Landgrave of Thuringia (1332–1381)
- Frederick III, Margrave of Meissen (1332–1381)
- Frederick III the Simple (1341–1377), King of Sicily
- Frederick III, Duke of Austria (1347–1362)
- Frederick III, Count of Moers (1354–1417)
- Frederick III, Count of Veldenz (died 1444)
- Frederick III, Holy Roman Emperor (1415–1493)
- Frederick III, Duke of Brunswick-Lüneburg (1424–1495)
- Frederick III, Elector of Saxony (1463–1525), also known as Frederick the Wise
- Frederick III, Elector Palatine (1515–1576)
- Frederick III, Duke of Legnica (1520–1570)
- Frederick III, Duke of Holstein-Gottorp (1597–1659)
- Frederick III of Denmark (1609–1670)
- Frederick III, Margrave of Brandenburg-Ansbach (1616–1634)
- Frederick III of Brandenburg (1657–1713), also Frederick I of Prussia, Elector of Brandenburg
- Frederick III, Landgrave of Hesse-Homburg (1673–1746)
- Frederick III, Duke of Saxe-Gotha-Altenburg (1699–1772)
- Frederick Philipse III (1720–1786)
- Frederick III, Prince of Salm-Kyrburg (1744–1794)
- Friedrich III, Landgrave of Hesse-Cassel (1747–1837)
- Frederick III, Duke of Wurttemberg (1754–1816)
- Frederick III, German Emperor (1831–1888)

== See also ==
- Emperor Frederick III (disambiguation)
- Frederick William III (disambiguation)
- Frederick Augustus III, Elector of Saxony (1750–1827), who then became King Frederick Augustus I of Saxony
- Frederick Augustus III of Saxony (1865–1932), king of Saxony 1904–1918
- Frederick Francis III, Grand Duke of Mecklenburg-Schwerin (1851–1897)
