= Fred Williams (Canadian soccer) =

English-born Canadian soccer player

Personal information
- Full name: Frederick Williams
- Date of birth: 1896
- Place of birth: Bristol, England
- Date of death: 1 September 1929 (aged 32–33)
- Place of death: Toronto, Ontario
- Position: Defender

Senior career*
Years	Team	Apps	(Gls)
1924–1929	Toronto Ulster United FC		

International career
1925–1926	Canada	2	(0)
- * Club domestic league appearances and goals

Fred Williams (1896 – 1 September 1929) was a Canadian soccer player who played as a defender for Toronto Ulster United FC and for Canada.

== Career ==
Williams was born in Bristol, England and served in the British Army during the World War I. He would later immigrate to Canada and in 1924 he would play soccer with Toronto Ulster United in the Inter-City League and later in the National Soccer League. Throughout his tenure with Toronto he would secure the Challenge Trophy in 1925, and the Ontario Cup in 1927. In 1927, he participated in the NSL Championship final where Toronto defeated Montreal Maroons for the title.

He died on September 1, 1929, from cavernous sinus thrombosis after an incident at work where hot asphalt splashed behind his ear causing an infection.

== International career ==
Williams made his debut for the Canada men's national soccer team on November 8, 1925, against the United States in a friendly match. He made another appearance for Canada on November 6, 1926, against the United States once more.
