= Eugene B. Jackson =

United States Army Air Forces Tuskegee Airman (1923–2015

- Born: June 26, 1923; Portland, Maine
- Died: September 20, 2015 (aged 91–92)
- Spouse: Constance (Cordice) Jackson
- Military career
- Allegiance: United States
- Branch: United States Army Air Force
- Rank: Master Sergeant
- Nickname: Sonny
- Conflicts: World War II
- Awards: Congressional Gold Medal

Eugene B. Jackson (June 26, 1923 – September 20, 2015) was a mechanic in the United States Army Air Force who served with the Tuskegee Airmen in World War II.

== Early life ==
Jackson was born into one of the oldest black families in Portland, Maine in 1923. Growing up, he was the only black student in his elementary school of more than 350 and one of only twelve of the 1000 in his class at Portland High School, from which he graduated in 1941.

== Military service ==
Jackson originally tried to join the Royal Canadian Air Force, as many Americans had done prior to the United States' entry into the war, but was told to try in the US first. He joined the Army Air Force in 1942. It was at this point, Jackson later claimed, that he first began to experience discrimination or intolerance based on his race. Jackson first went to Fort Devens in Massachusetts after joining up, but was almost immediately sent, along with all the other black recruits, to Tuskegee, Alabama. Over the course of the following two years, he traveled across the United States to receive mechanical and aircraft instrument instruction, sparing him some of the worst example of racism acted upon the Tuskegee Airmen who remained in Alabama for the whole of their training. Jackson was stationed in Italy and North Africa beginning in 1944 with the 332nd Fighter Group and followed them to mainland Europe after the Normandy invasion. For the duration of the war he was responsible for maintaining the groups' fighter plane radios and communications equipment.

He was discharged at the end of the war but trouble finding a job as a black airplane mechanic in the civilian world led him to rejoin the military for a short time in 1950.

== Post-War ==
After leaving the military, Jackson worked as a machinist and on respiratory equipment for some time. He moved to Boston briefly and then to Marshfield, Massachusetts and enrolled at Boston University as an engineering graduate. While there he met his future wife, Constance (Cordice) Jackson, a teacher in the public school system.
