= Paul Lockhart (historian) =

American historian (born 1963)

Paul D. Lockhart
- Born: Paul Douglas Lockhart; 3 February 1963; Poughkeepsie, New York, United States
- Occupations: author, historian
- Relatives: Keith Lockhart (brother)
- Writing career
- Genres: military history, Scandinavian history

Paul D. Lockhart (born 1963) is an American historian who specializes in American and Scandinavian military history. He has authored several well known books such as The Drillmaster of Valley Forge: The Baron de Steuben and the Making of the American Army (New York: HarperCollins, 2008) and The Whites of Their Eyes: Bunker Hill, the First American Army, and the Emergence of George Washington (New York: HarperCollins, 2011). A native of Poughkeepsie, New York, Lockhart did his undergraduate work at SUNY Potsdam and then did his graduate studies at Purdue University under Gunther E. Rothenberg. Since 1989, Lockhart has taught at Wright State University in Dayton, Ohio. Prior to working with the American Revolution, Lockhart published four books dealing with Scandinavian military history: Denmark in the Thirty Years' War, 1618–1648: King Christian IV and the Decline of the Oldenburg State (Selinsgrove, PA: Susquehanna University Press, 1996), Frederik II and the Protestant Cause: Denmark's Role in the Wars of Religion, 1559–1596 (Leiden: Brill, 2004); Sweden in the Seventeenth Century (Palgrave Macmillan UK, 2004), and Denmark, 1513–1660: The Rise and Decline of a Renaissance Monarchy (Oxford: Oxford University Press UK, 2007).

Lockhart is currently working with Wright State University's CELIA (Collaborative Education, Leadership & Innovation in the Arts) on a project to commemorate the 100th anniversary of World War I in Dayton, Ohio. He is also working on a book focusing on the last month of World War I. Lockhart was named the Brage Golding Distinguished Professor of Research in 2014.

== Bibliography ==
- Denmark in the Thirty Years' War, 1618–1648: King Christian IV and the Decline of the Oldenburg State (1996)
- Frederik II and the Protestant Cause: Denmark's Role in the Wars of Religion, 1559–1596 (2004)
- Sweden in the Seventeenth Century (2004)
- Denmark, 1513–1660: The Rise and Decline of a Renaissance Monarchy (2007)
- The Drillmaster of Valley Forge: The Baron de Steuben and the Making of the American Army (2008)
- The Whites of Their Eyes: Bunker Hill, the First American Army, and the Emergence of George Washington (2011)
