= Frederick A. Williams =

Frederick A. Williams (March 3, 1869 – July 31, 1942) was an American pianist and composer from Cleveland, Ohio.

Williams was born in Oberlin, Ohio, the son of Charles Williams and Martha Maria Sabin Williams. Williams headed the department of piano and theory at the Cleveland School of Music. Much of his output consisted of pedagogical pieces for piano; he also composed a handful of songs. He is buried at Lake View Cemetery in Cleveland.
