= Frederick William III (disambiguation) =

Frederick William III of Prussia (1770–1840) was king of Prussia from 1797 to 1840.

Frederick William III or Friedrich Wilhelm III may also refer to:

- Friedrich Wilhelm III, Duke of Saxe-Altenburg (1657–1672)
- Frederick William III, Duke of Schleswig-Holstein-Sonderburg-Beck (1723–1757)
- Frederick William III, Landgrave of Hesse (1854–1888), titular Landgrave of Hesse-Kassel
