= Formality =

Pre-established acts or words

A formality is an established procedure or set of specific behaviors and utterances, conceptually similar to a ritual although typically secular and less involved. A formality may be as simple as a handshake upon making new acquaintances in Western culture to the carefully defined procedure of bows, handshakes, formal greetings, and business card exchanges that may mark two businessmen being introduced in Japan. In legal and diplomatic circles, formalities include such matters as greeting an arriving head of state with the appropriate national anthem.

Cultures and groups within cultures often have varying degrees of formality which can often prove a source of frustration or unintentional insult when people of different expectations or preferences interact. Those from relatively informal backgrounds may find formality to be empty and hypocritical, or unnecessarily demanding. Those from relatively formal backgrounds may find informal cultures hard to deal with, as their carefully refined and nuanced behaviors go completely unnoticed.

The difference between formality and politeness is often a point of confusion for those from relatively informal cultures. On the other hand, those who have been brought up in relatively formal circumstances often experience discomfort and even, over the long term, disenchantment, in less formal circumstances.

== See also ==
- Register (sociolinguistics) – Form of language used for a particular purpose or in a particular communicative situation
- Honorific – Title that conveys esteem, courtesy, or respect for position or rank
