= Frederick William II =

Frederick William II may refer to:

- Frederick William II, Duke of Saxe-Altenburg (1603–1669)
- Frederick William II, Duke of Schleswig-Holstein-Sonderburg-Beck (1687–1749)
- Frederick William II, Prince of Nassau-Siegen (1706–1734)
- Frederick William II of Prussia (1744–1797), King of Prussia from 1786
