= List of consorts of Holstein-Gottorp =

The Duchesses of Holstein-Gottorp were the consorts of the rulers of Holstein-Gottorp.

== Duchess consort of Schleswig and Holstein in Gottorp, 1544–1713 ==
| Picture | Name | Father | Birth | Marriage | Became Duchess | Ceased to be Duchess | Death | Spouse |
|---|---|---|---|---|---|---|---|---|
| | Christine of Hesse | Philip I, Landgrave of Hesse (Hesse) | 29 June 1543 | 17 December 1564 | | 1 October 1586 husband's death | 13 May 1604 | Adolf |
| | Augusta of Denmark | Frederick II of Denmark (Oldenburg) | 8 April 1580 | 30 August 1596 | | 31 March 1616 husband's death | 5 February 1639 | John Adolf |
| | Marie Elisabeth of Saxony | John George I, Elector of Saxony (Wettin) | 22 November 1610 | 21 February 1630 | | 10 August 1659 husband's death | 24 October 1684 | Frederick III |
| | Frederika Amalia of Denmark | Frederick III of Denmark (Oldenburg) | 11 April 1649 | 24 October 1667 | | 6 January 1695 husband's death | 30 October 1704 | Christian Albert |
| | Hedvig Sophia of Sweden | Charles XI of Sweden (Palatinate-Zweibrücken) | 26 June 1681 | 12 May 1698 | | 19 July 1702 husband's death | 22 December 1708 | Frederick IV |

== Duchess consort of Holstein-Gottorp, since 1713 ==
Reigning Duchess consort of Holstein-Gottorp, 1713–1773
| Picture | Name | Father | Birth | Marriage | Became Duchess | Ceased to be Duchess | Death | Spouse |
| | Anna Petrovna of Russia | Peter I of Russia (Romanov) | 27 January 1708 | 22 November 1724 | | 4 March 1728 | | Charles Frederick |
| | Sophie of Anhalt-Zerbst | Christian August, Prince of Anhalt-Zerbst (Ascania) | 2 May 1729 | 21 August 1745 | | 17 July 1762 husband's death | 17 November 1796 | Charles Peter Ulrich |

== See also ==
- Dukes of Holstein-Gottorp
- List of consorts of Schleswig and Holstein
- List of consorts of Holstein-Sonderborg
- List of Russian consorts
- List of Danish consorts
- List of consorts of Oldenburg
- List of Norwegian queens
- List of Finnish consorts
- List of Swedish consorts
