= Hedvig Sophia of Sweden =

Duchess of Holstein-Gottorp from 1698 to 1702

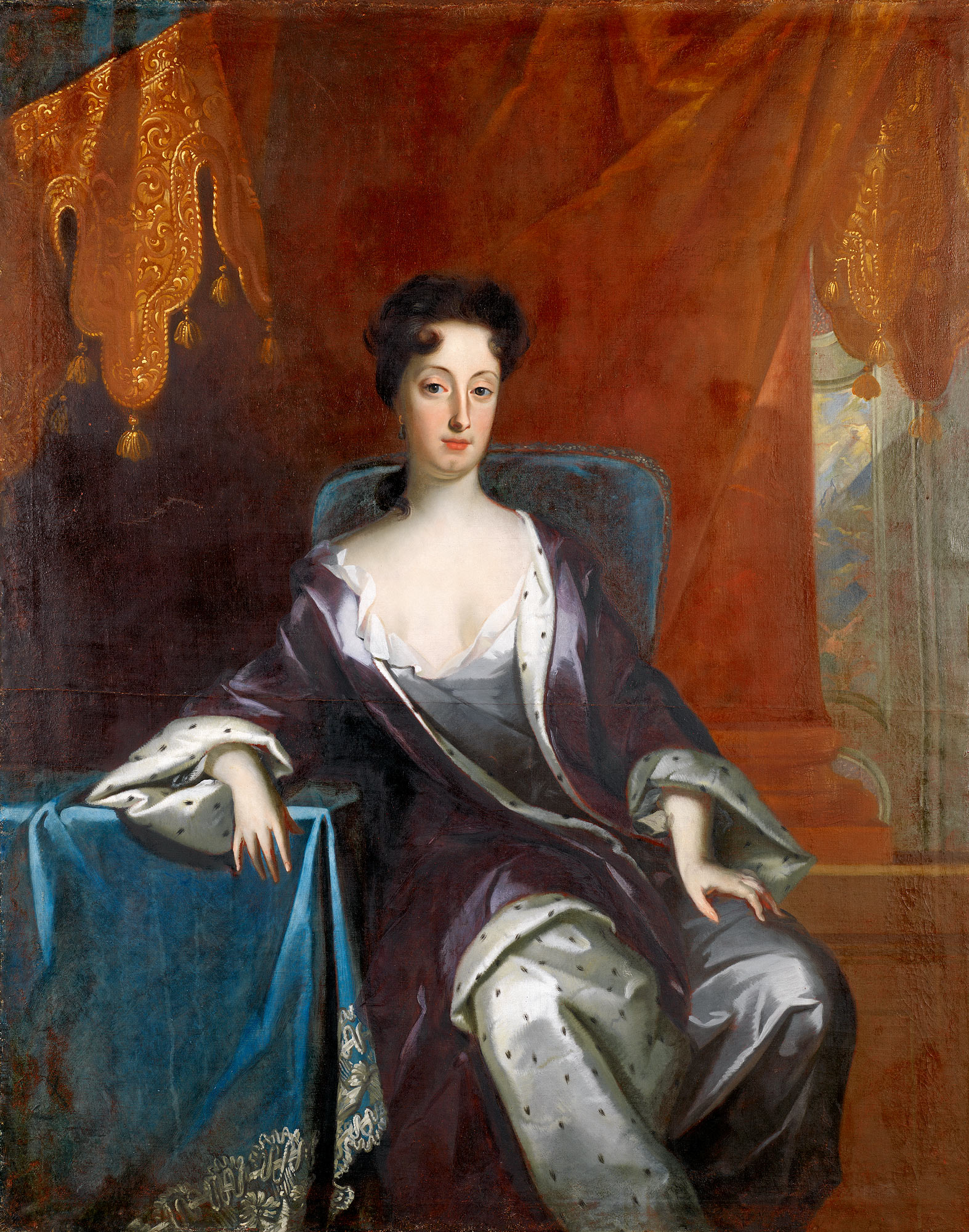
- Princess Hedvig Sofia by David von Krafft.

Duchess consort of Holstein-Gottorp
- Tenure: 12 May 1698 – 19 July 1702
- Born: 26 June 1681; Three Crowns Castle, Stockholm, Sweden
- Died: 22 December 1708 (aged 27); Stockholm, Sweden
- Burial: Riddarholm Church, Sweden
- Spouse: Frederick IV, Duke of Holstein-Gottorp (m. 1698; died 1702)
- Issue: Charles Frederick, Duke of Holstein-Gottorp
Names
- Hedvig Sofia Augusta
- House: Wittelsbach
- Father: Charles XI of Sweden
- Mother: Ulrike Eleonora of Denmark

Hedvig Sophia Augusta of Sweden (26 June 1681 – 22 December 1708), Duchess of Holstein-Gottorp, was the eldest child of Charles XI of Sweden and Ulrike Eleonore of Denmark. She was heiress presumptive to the Swedish throne from her birth until that of her brother one year later and again from the start of his reign as King of Sweden, in 1697, until her death and the regent of the duchy of Holstein-Gottorp for her minor son from 1702 to 1708. Some sources refer to her as Sofia.

== Youth ==
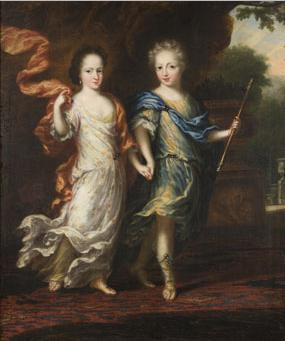
Painting of Princess Hedvig Sofia of Sweden and her brother, the future Charles XII of Sweden.

Hedvig Sophia spent the majority of her upbringing at Karlberg Palace. After the death of her mother in 1693, she and her siblings were placed under the custody of her grandmother Hedvig Eleonora of Holstein-Gottorp. Her personal caretaker was Juliana Schierberg, who was to be her lifelong and influential confidante. Hedvig Sophia was, and continued to be, the favorite of her grandmother. Due to her grandmother's influence, she came to harbor anti-Danish views. She was described as beautiful, passionate but dignified, and as a good student, particularly in painting. She was also noted to be cheerful in the otherwise strict Swedish court, and it was noted that her father spent more money on her than he was usually willing to do on other things.

Between 1697 and 1699, there was a Danish policy to create an alliance with Sweden through a double wedding between Charles XII of Sweden and Princess Sophia Hedwig of Denmark, and Prince Charles of Denmark and Hedvig Sophia of Sweden (after the marriage of Hedvig Sophia in 1698, she was replaced by Ulrika Eleonora of Sweden). Jens Juel (diplomat) are known to have engaged Beata Elisabet von Königsmarck to promote the matches. However, none of the marriages was materialized.

== Duchess consort ==
On 12 May 1698 at Karlberg she married her cousin, Frederick IV, Duke of Holstein-Gottorp. Her marriage was arranged as a part of the traditional Swedish policy of alliance with Holstein-Gottorp against Denmark; her brother had earlier been expected to marry Frederick's sister, but he refused. The marriage, which had been decided upon during her childhood, took place against her consent and was not happy. She did not like the debauched life of Frederick IV, for which he was known even before their marriage.

She visited Holstein-Gottorp in 1698 and remained there for about a year. During Hedvig Sophia's stay in Gottorp, Frederick regularly visited his lovers in Hamburg and also brought some of them to Gottorp. Her Mistress of the Robes, Beata Magdalena Wittenberg, became involved in a physical argument with a male courtier who acted as the pimp of Frederick, an argument which ended with Wittenberg losing her wig and Hedvig Sophia's demand to return to Sweden.

In 1699 she returned to Sweden, where she was second in line to the Swedish throne and presumptive heir. She resided mainly at Karlberg. Hedvig Sophia was an eager participant in the frequent partying that dominated her brother's court for a few years before the Great Northern War, and she spent most of her life at the Swedish court. Her marriage was the starting point of a long series of festivities which lasted until her departure, and upon her return, another series of festivities was launched which lasted until the outbreak of the war.

Hedvig Sophia was regarded to have political influence over her brother the monarch: on 1 October 1702, count Magnus Stenbock gave his spouse countess Eva Oxenstierna the task of using her influence in the parliament to contact Hedvig Sophia and ask her to make Charles XII to end the war and ask for peace.

== Regent ==
On 18 October 1702, Hedvig Sofia became a widow and formal Regent for her minor son, the Duke of Holstein-Gottorp. However, she spent most of her time in Sweden and rarely visited the home of her spouse: she left the daily affairs of the duchy to Christian August of Holstein-Gottorp, the uncle of her late spouse, but matters of major importance were always to be confirmed by her. She did have plans to visit Holstein-Gottorp in 1705, but her brother asked her to remain in Sweden, which she consented to do. As Regent, Hedvig Sophia made sure that the old policy of Holstein-Gottorp was kept, with an alliance with Sweden as protection against Denmark. This led to some strain relation with the administration in Holstein-Gottorp, who was considering a different alliance, but she kept in control of the policy and her line was kept until her death without it leading to any open conflict.

In Sweden, she worked to have her son accepted as an heir to the Swedish throne, and the "Holstein Party", as it was to be called after the death of her brother, was also the most successful contestant under her leadership until her death in 1708. As a widow, she was the object of plans to arrange a new political marriage. Among the candidates were the Crown Prince of Hanover, that is the future King George II of Great Britain. However, she refused a new arranged marriage. She was by then involved with the young courtier count Olof Gyllenborg. She was acquainted with Gyllenborg since before her marriage, and after the death of her spouse, he made it known to her that he was in love with her through a poem with the message that it was better to confess to a love than to let it die. That relationship was open public knowledge at court and seems to have been accepted, though much disliked by her grandmother, Hedwig Eleonora of Holstein-Gottorp.

At the Swedish royal court, Hedvig Sophia was described as a beauty with an interest in fashion, and referred to as "The Happy Princess". She was the center of the social life at court, and it was said that all pleasure of court life ended after her death. She was an accomplished singer: during the Great Northern war, she appeared as a singer at concerts at court, while her sister, Ulrika Eleonora, played the clavier. Like her sister, she repeatedly asked her brother for permission to visit him on the battle field during the war, which was common for many other women to do, but he refused them every time.

In 1708 she died of smallpox, which she had contracted by nursing her son through the illness. The relationship between her and her brother, King Carl, was very deep. In July 1709, her brother, who recently had become a refugee of his military catastrophe at Poltava and was far away in Bendery (today in Moldavia) finally received the news of Hedvig Sophia's death in Stockholm the previous December. Carl at first refused to believe it, and this was the only time he was ever known to have wept. It was "an event which I had trusted never to be so unhappy to survive" and he suffered from "that grief which can never altogether leave me until those who have been parted shall meet again". Hedvig Sophia's proper funeral and interment in Riddarholm Church did not take place until 1718, after the death of Carl. She was temporarily interred in 1708, but her permanent funeral was delayed awaiting her brother's orders from how it should be conducted. In 1716, however, she was hastily buried along with her grandmother without him being asked, as they were worried that he would insist on a funeral of a kind which the country could no longer afford.

She is perhaps most well known for the extensive correspondence between her and her brother King Carl XII, who spent much of his life on war campaigns abroad. When he died in 1718 and left no heirs to the throne, the late Hedvig Sophia's only child, Duke Karl Friedrich was in line to succeed him, but the late king's younger sister Ulrica Eleonora quickly moved herself onto the throne instead.

Hedvig Sophia was the paternal grandmother of Emperor Peter III of Russia.

== Issue ==
| Name | Birth | Death | Notes |
|---|---|---|---|
| Charles Frederick, Duke of Holstein-Gottorp | 30 April 1700 | 18 June 1739 | married Grand Duchess Anna Petrovna of Russia and had issue. |

== Ancestors ==
Ancestors of Hedvig Sophia of Sweden

8. John Casimir, Count Palatine of Zweibrücken-Kleeburg
4. Charles X Gustav of Sweden
9. Catharina of Sweden
2. Charles XI of Sweden
10. Frederick III, Duke of Holstein-Gottorp
5. Hedvig Eleonora of Holstein-Gottorp
11. Marie Elisabeth of Saxony
1. Hedvig Sophia of Sweden
12. Christian IV of Denmark
6. Frederick III of Denmark
13. Anne Catherine of Brandenburg
3. Ulrike Eleonora of Denmark
14. George, Duke of Brunswick-Lüneburg
7. Sophie Amalie of Brunswick-Lüneburg
15. Anne Eleonore of Hesse-Darmstadt

== Notes ==
Hedvig Sophia of Sweden House of Wittelsbach Born: 26 June 1681 Died: 22 December 1708
Royal titles
| Preceded by Princess Frederica Amalia of Denmark | Duchess consort of Holstein-Gottorp; 12 May 1698 – 19 July 1702 | Succeeded by Grand Duchess Anna Petrovna of Russia |
