= Holstein Party =

Political party in Sweden (1718–1727)

The Holstein Party (Swedish: Holsteinska partiet), was the name of a political group in 18th-century Sweden which played a significant role in politics after the death of Charles XII of Sweden in 1718 and until 1727.

== History ==
The party was created in 1718 of those who favored Charles Frederick, Duke of Holstein-Gottorp, son of Charles XII’s elder sister Hedvig Sophia of Sweden, as heir to the throne before that of Ulrika Eleonora, Queen of Sweden.

The party lost to the followers of Ulrika Eleonora in 1719, and to her spouse and successor Frederick I of Sweden in 1720. But due to Frederick I’s plans to strengthen royal power with support of the Hovpartiet, the Holstein Party were given a favorable situation have Charles Frederick appointed heir to the throne, a situation which was supported by Tsar Peter the Great of Russia who wished influence in Sweden.

In the Riksdag of 1723, the attempt of the king and Hovpartiet to introduce absolute power was crushed and the Holstein Party, whose follower filled the seats of parliament and bought more followers by granting allowances and titles from Holstein and Russia, especially to those losing their property during the Great Northern War: Charles Frederick was granted the title Royal Highness, a Swedish allowance and an informal promise to be considered as heir to the throne should such an election be necessary. The marriage of Charles Frederick to the Russian princess Anna Petrovna and the accession of her mother as Empress Catherine I of Russia in 1725 signified a triumph for the Holstein Party: the rumours that Charles Frederick was about to be appointed Russian heir to the throne or at least be granted the Baltic provinces made him an attractive heir to the Swedish throne by those in Sweden wishing to restore the Swedish Empire, and ambassador Josias Cederhielm was sent to Russia. These plans were however prevented by Arvid Horn with support of the king and the ambassadors of France and Great Britain to prevent Sweden from being involved in a war through Russia's promise to reconquer Slesvig to Holstein from Denmark.

During the Riksdag of 1726-1727, Horn managed to have the Riksdag vote for Sweden to join the Treaty of Hanover (1725) against Russia, and the Holstein followers was removed from the royal council and replaced with the followers of Horn. The defeat of the Holstein Party was completed by the death of Catherine I, which destroyed the power base of Charles Frederick in Russia and forced him to leave for Holstein.
