= Duke of Holstein-Gottorp =

European dynasty of German origin

House of Holstein-Gottorp
- Parent house: Oldenburg
- Country: Russian Empire; Kingdom of Denmark; Kingdom of Sweden; Kingdom of Norway; Grand Duchy of Oldenburg; Duchy of Oldenburg; Duchy of Schleswig; Duchy of Holstein
- Etymology: From Holstein region and Gottorf Castle, Schleswig
- Founded: 1544; 482 years ago
- Founder: Adolf of Denmark
- Current head: Christian, Duke of Oldenburg
- Final ruler: Schleswig-Holstein: Paul I; Russia: Nicholas II; Oldenburg: Frederick Augustus II
- Titles: List: Emperor of Russia (1762–1917); King of Sweden (1751–1818); King of Norway (1814–1818); Grand Duke of Oldenburg (1823–1918); Duke of Oldenburg (1774–1823); Duke of Schleswig (1544–1773); Duke of Holstein (1544–1773)
- Estates: Gottorf Castle (former, Schleswig-Holstein); Schloss Oldenburg (former, Oldenburg); Winter Palace (former, Russia)
- Deposition: Schleswig-Holstein: 1773; Russian Empire: 1917; Oldenburg: 1918
- Cadet branches: Swedish line (extinct); Holstein-Gottorp-Romanov (agnatic)

Duchy of Schleswig-Holstein-Gottorp Herzogtum Schleswig-Holstein-Gottorf (German) Hertugdømmet Slesvig-Holsten-Gottorp (Danish)
- 1544–1773
- Merchant Ensign of Holstein-Gottorp Coat of arms

- Status: Duchy (originally as an Appanage)
- Capital: Schleswig
- Ethnic groups: Germans, Danes

Government
  - Duke: Adolf I (First)
  - Duke: Paul I (last)
- Establishment: 1544
- History
  - Second partitioning of Schleswig-Holstein: 1544
  - Treaty of Frederiksborg: 1720
  - Treaty of Tsarskoye Selo: 1773
  - Established: 1544
  - Disestablished: 1773
- Today part of: Germany; Denmark

Holstein-Gottorp (pronounced [ˈhɔlʃtaɪn ˈɡɔtɔʁp]) is the historiographical name, as well as contemporary shorthand name, for the parts of the duchies of Schleswig and Holstein, also known as Ducal Holstein, that were ruled by the dukes of Schleswig-Holstein-Gottorp, a side branch of the German House of Oldenburg. Other parts of the duchies were ruled by the kings of Denmark.

The territories of Gottorp are located in present-day Denmark and Germany. The main seat of the dukes was Gottorf Castle in the city of Schleswig in the duchy of Schleswig. It is also the name of the ducal house, which ascended to several thrones. For this reason, genealogists and historians sometimes use the name of Holstein-Gottorp for related dynasties of other countries.

The formal title adopted by these rulers was "Duke of Schleswig, Holstein, Dithmarschen and Stormarn", but that title was also used by his kinsmen, the kings of Denmark and their cadet branches, as it was the common property of all these agnates. The Gottorp branch held Landeshoheit (territorial superiority) over the duchy of Holstein in the Holy Roman Empire and over the duchy of Schleswig in the kingdom of Denmark. For the sake of convenience, the name Holstein-Gottorp is used instead of the technically more correct "Duke of Schleswig and Holstein in/at Gottorp".

The oldest of the ducal titles was that of Schleswig, which had been confirmed in fief to a royal kinsman by the regent Queen Margaret I of Denmark, Sweden and Norway in 1386 on behalf of her son, Olaf II of Denmark. The kings of Denmark were granted Holstein as an imperial fief by the Holy Roman Emperor Frederick III in 1474.

== History ==
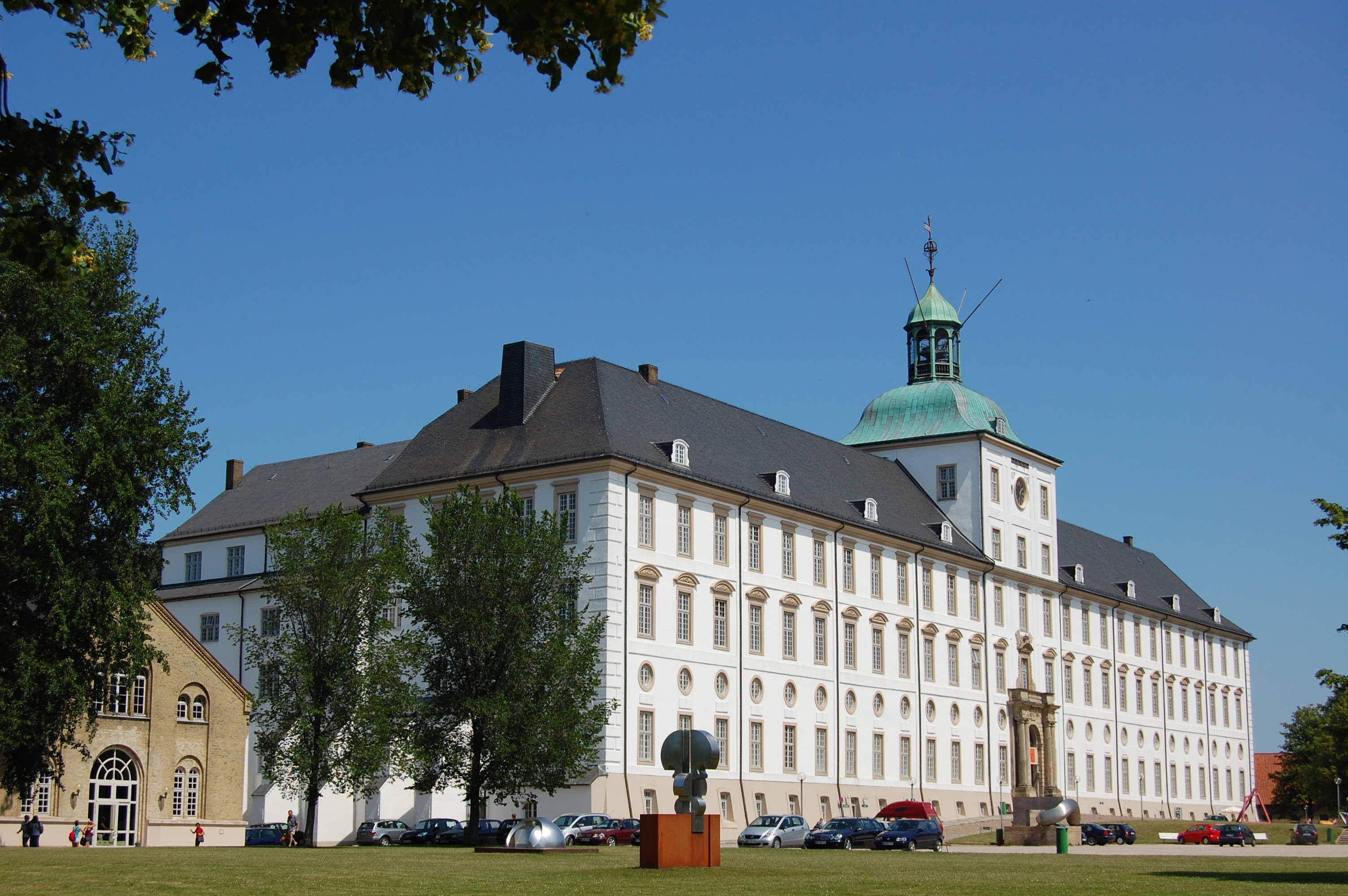
Gottorf Castle, after which the house of Holstein-Gottorp is named

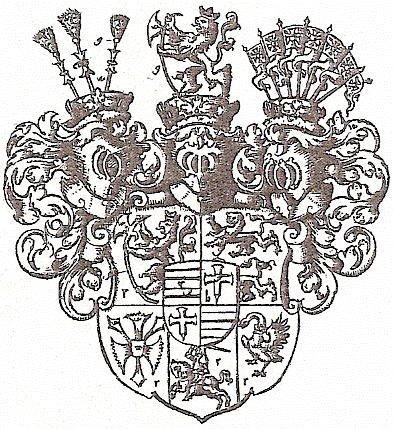
Coat of arms of the Duchy of Holstein-Gottorp (from Siebmachers Wappenbuch)

In 1544, the so-called "one-third duchy" was ceded to Adolf, third son of King Frederick I of Denmark and the youngest half-brother of King Christian III of Denmark. Thus, the surviving House of Holstein-Gottorp is a cadet branch of the House of Oldenburg. The Dukes of Holstein-Gottorp shared the uneasy rule of Schleswig and Holstein with the Kings of Denmark. As such, they were often allies (practically clients) of the Swedes, enemies of the Danes. This longtime alliance was sealed by several dynastic marriages: Christina of Holstein-Gottorp married Charles IX of Sweden, Hedwig Eleonora of Holstein-Gottorp married Charles X Gustavus, Duke Frederick IV married the eldest daughter of King Charles XI of Sweden, and ultimately Prince Adolf Frederick of Holstein-Gottorp ascended to the Swedish throne in 1751, founding the Holstein-Gottorp dynasty of Sweden (ruled 1751–1818).

By the Treaty of Roskilde (1658) and the Treaty of Copenhagen (1660), Denmark-Norway released Gottorp from its feudal bonds and recognized the sovereignty of its dukes over the Gottorp portions of the duchy of Schleswig. In fact, these Schleswigers had been relatively independent already for more than a century. Although the duchy of Holstein remained officially a fief of the Empire, in fact by treaty its dukes co-governed both duchies with their formal overlord, the Danish king.

=== Gottorp question ===
In the Great Northern War, the duchy sided with Sweden and was defeated after Danish troops occupied the northern portions of Holstein-Gottorp. According to the 1720 Treaty of Frederiksborg, Swedish support for Gottorp ceased, making it impossible for the dukes to regain their lost territories in Schleswig and prolonging their feud with the king of Denmark. Following the peace settlement of 1721, Duke Charles Frederick fled to the court of Peter the Great of Russia, and for some time, the Russians plotted to restore Charles Frederick to his lands in Schleswig. Charles Frederick himself was married to Grand Duchess Anna, Peter's daughter. Peter II and his successors abandoned the policy of Peter the Great of backing the claims of the dukes of Holstein-Gottorp on their part of Schleswig. In fact, to gain a port on the coast of the Northern sea, Russia needed not Schleswig but the friendship of dukes. But from this marriage was born Charles Peter Ulrich, who succeeded to Holstein-Gottorp in 1739, and became an heir to the Russian throne according to the will of Catherine I and especially upon the accession of his childless aunt Elizabeth in 1741.

Charles Peter Ulrich, who acceded to the Russian throne as Peter III in 1762, was determined to reclaim his part of Schleswig from Denmark–Norway and to attach it to Holstein. When he became emperor in 1762, he immediately signed a generous peace with Prussia and withdrew Russia from the Seven Years' War in order to concentrate fully on an attack upon Denmark together with Prussia. This move was unpopular in Russia, since it was considered a betrayal of Russia's sacrifices in the war, as well as placing national interests in jeopardy. At the same time, the Danish army had hastily moved across the border into Mecklenburg, to deter an invasion of Holstein, and prepared for battle. The Russian army had advanced to less than 30 km from the Danes when it learned that Peter III had been overthrown by his wife, who acceded to the throne as Empress Catherine II. One of her first actions was to call off the war against Denmark, surrender territorial claims, and restore normal relations.

Peter III's son, Paul, the new Duke of Holstein-Gottorp, was a minor under the regency of his mother, the empress. With the 1773 Treaty of Tsarskoye Selo, she agreed to cede the territorial claims of her son to the Holstein-Gottorp lands still held by Denmark and to cede the part of Duchy, held by her husband, obtaining in exchange the German countships of Oldenburg and Delmenhorst, elevated in 1776 into the duchy of Oldenburg within the Holy Roman Empire. The duchy was given to the cousin of Paul's grandfather—the aged Prince-Bishop of Lübeck, Frederick August, head of a younger branch of the Holstein-Gottorp family. This put an end to the Gottorp question, which had generated so many conflicts between the Nordic powers.

The House of Holstein-Gottorp acceded to several European thrones. The dynastic policy of the dukes of Holstein-Gottorp resulted in its cadet branch, the Swedish line, ruling Sweden from 1751 until 1818 and Norway from 1814 to 1818. In 1863, the related House of Schleswig-Holstein-Sonderburg-Glücksburg — descended from King Christian III of Denmark — became Kings of Denmark and Greece and, in 1905, of Norway.

The Lübeck branch became first dukes and later grand dukes of Oldenburg from (1773 until 1918), while the senior branch ruled Russia briefly in 1762 and then again from 1796 until 1917 (while in 1762–1796 it was ruled by their widow, second cousin and mother). However although agnatic members of this house reigned in Russia, they were commonly called Romanov, or more rarely, Holstein-Gottorp-Romanov.

== Dukes of Schleswig-Holstein-Gottorp ==
Dukes of Schleswig and Holstein at Gottorp:

Coat of arms of Count Adolf of Holstein-Gottorp

- 1544–1586: Adolf
- 1586–1587: Frederick II
- 1587–1590: Philip
- 1590–1616: John Adolf
- 1616–1659: Frederick III
- 1659–1694: Christian Albert
- 1694–1702: Frederick IV
- 1702–1720: Charles Frederick

Dukes of Holstein-Gottorp at Kiel:

- 1720–1739: Charles Frederick
- 1739–1762: Karl Peter Ulrich (later Peter III of Russia)
- 1762–1773: Paul (Emperor 1796–1801) 1773 exchanged claim for Duchy of Oldenburg

Titular Dukes of Holstein-Gottorp at St Petersburg (House of Holstein-Gottorp-Romanov):

Coat of Arms of the House of Holstein-Gottorp-Romanov

- 1773–1801: Paul (Emperor 1796–1801)
- 1801–1825: Alexander I of Russia
- 1825–1831: Grand Duke Constantine Pavlovich of Russia
- 1831–1856: Nicholas I of Russia
- 1856–1881: Alexander II of Russia
- 1881–1894: Alexander III of Russia
- 1894–1918: Nicholas II of Russia
- 1918–1918: Alexei Nikolaevich, Tsarevich of Russia (At the murder of the Emperor and his family it is understood that the Emperor was the first to die. Therefore, Tsarevitch Alexei briefly became titular Duke)
- 1918–1938: Cyril Vladimirovich, Grand Duke of Russia (After the murder of the Emperor and the Tsarevitch in 1918, the title passed to the surviving senior male branch of the Romanov family)
- 1938–1992: Vladimir Kirillovich, Grand Duke of Russia (Grand Duke Vladimir died with only female issue, and so the title should pass to the senior male member of the House of Romanov-Holstein-Gottorp. To whom is a contested issue)

One view is that the heir is the non-dynastic son of Grand Duke Dimitri, only son of Grand Duke Paul, himself the youngest brother of Alexander III. This heir is non-dynastic in the Russian sense, but the Danish branch of the House of Oldenburg had no declared ban against unequal marriages (but against non authorized marriages in Denmark), as Schleswig, where the (once sovereign) Schloss Gottorf is located, was never part of Holy Roman Empire or under its jurisdiction. These heirs live in USA and have not staked a public claim to titles.

- 1992–2004: Prince Paul Dimitrievich Romanovsky-Ilyinsky
- 2004–present: Prince Dimitri Pavlovich Romanovsky-Ilyinsky (born 1954)

Prince Dimitri Pavlovich Romanovsky-Ilyinsky has no sons. His only male heir, his brother Prince Michael Romanovsky-Ilyinsky, is also without male issue, and there are currently no further male heirs in the Romanovsky-Ilyinsky line to inherit this theoretical claim to the Duchy. This claim would then pass on through the line of Grand Duke Alexander Mikhailovich of Russia to Andrew Andreevich, Prince of Russia and his descendants.

Another view determines that Nicholas II's August 11, 1903 renunciation of claims to the Oldenburg titles and duchy for himself and for all his family and descendants made it impossible for any of the Romanov heirs to bear the dynastically valid Schleswig Holstein titles independently.

A third view is that by the end of the Holy Roman Empire it was a principle of German princely law that members of all princely families which held Reichsstand status therein were required to contract ebenbürtig in order to transmit dynastic rights to their descendants. If descendants of Grand Duke Dmitri's marriage with Audrey Emery are considered ineligible to succeed to the ducal Holstein claim, it is unclear which, if any, of the various male-line branches descended from the Imperial Romanovs remain eligible. If marriages-in-exile with Russian princesses or countesses meet the marital standard, male-line heirs may yet exist. If, however, all marriages deemed morganatic by Russian Imperial standards were also non-dynastic for the Gottorp succession, the genealogically senior Holstein-Gottorp dynast would be Christian, Duke of Oldenburg, current head of the branch descending from Christian August of Holstein-Gottorp, Prince of Eutin, the younger brother of Duke Frederick IV. He already holds claim to the defunct title of grand duke of Oldenburg. Either way, the king of Denmark exercised sovereignty in the duchies and provided financial support to the cadet Schleswig-Holstein branches of the House of Oldenburg. The claim to Holstein inherited by Emperor Paul I from Peter III was exchanged in 1773 for the Danish kings' duchy of Oldenburg (residual succession rights being retained), the rulers of which lost sovereignty there in 1918. King Christian IX of Denmark lost Schleswig and Holstein in the Second Schleswig War in 1864, subsequent to which both duchies were incorporated into the kingdom of Prussia and later the German Empire. Danish monarchs continued to use their traditional ducal titles in pretence until the death of King Frederik IX of Denmark in 1972. In 1920, Northern Schleswig was returned to Danish rule after a plebiscite; the remainder of the former duchies remains part of Germany.

== Family tree ==
House of Schleswig-Holstein-Gottorp

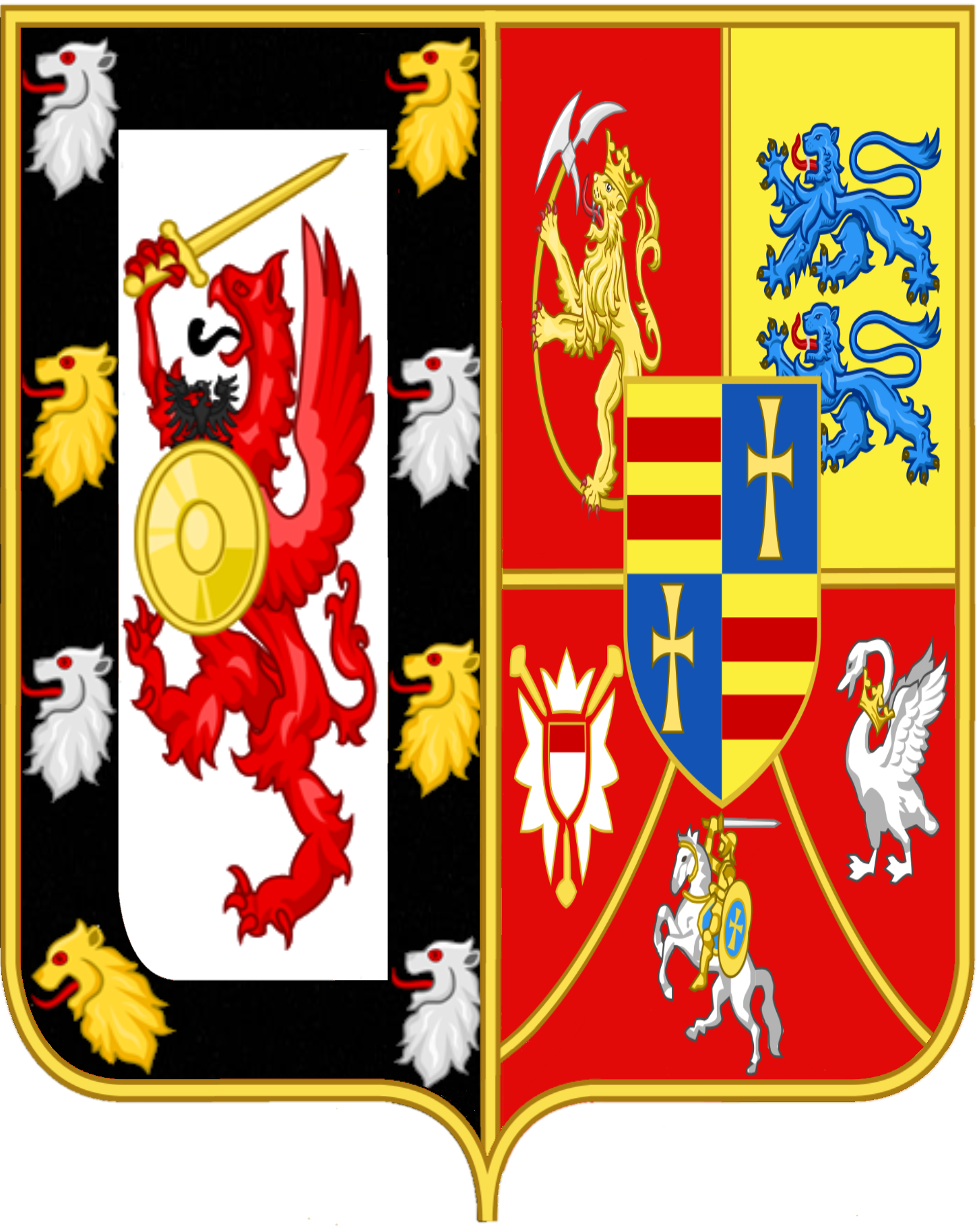
House of Oldenburg
Elimar I Count of Oldenburg r. 1091–1108 c. 1040–1112
Elimar II; Count of Oldenburg r. 1108–1142
Christian I the Quarrelsome; Count of Oldenburg r. 1143–1167 ?–1167
Maurice; Count of Oldenburg r. 1169–1211 c. 1145 – c. 1211
Christian II; Count of Oldenburg r. 1209–1233 ?–1233
John I Count of Oldenburg r. 1233–1270 c. 1204 – c. 1270
Christian III; Count of Oldenburg r. 1270–1285 ?–1285
John II; Count of Oldenburg r. 1285–1301 ? – c. 1314/6
Conrad I Count of Oldenburg r. 1324–1347 ?–1347
Christian V Count of Oldenburg r. 1368–1398 c. 1342 – c. 1399
Dietrich; Fortunatus; Count of Oldenburg r. 1403–1440; 1398–1440
Christian I King of Denmark r. 1448–1481; King of Norway r. 1450–1481; King of Sweden r. 1457–1464; 1426–1481
Frederick I King of Denmark r. 1523–1533; King of Norway r. 1524–1533; 1471–1533
House of Schleswig- Holstein-Gottorp
Adolf; Duke of Schleswig- Holstein-Gottorp r. 1544–1586; 1526–1586
Frederick II; Duke of Schleswig- Holstein-Gottorp r. 1586–1587; 1568–1587 | Philip; Duke of Schleswig- Holstein-Gottorp r. 1587–1590; 1570–1590 | John Adolf; Duke of Schleswig- Holstein-Gottorp r. 1590–1616; 1575–1616
Frederick III; Duke of Schleswig- Holstein-Gottorp r. 1616–1659; 1597–1659
Christian Albert; Duke of Schleswig- Holstein-Gottorp r. 1659–1695; 1641–1695
Frederick IV; Duke of Schleswig- Holstein-Gottorp r. 1695–1702; 1671–1702 | Christian August; 1673–1726
House of Romanov
Anna; Duchess consort of Holstein-Gottorp r. 1725–1728; 1708–1728 | Charles Frederick; Duke of Schleswig- Holstein-Gottorp r. 1702–1739; 1700–1739 | Adolf Frederick; King of Sweden r. 1751–1771; 1710–1771 | Frederick August I Duke of Oldenburg r. 1774–1785; 1711–1785 | George Louis; 1719–1763
House of Holstein- Gottorp-Romanov
Peter III; Emperor of Russia r. 1762–1762; 1728–1762 | Gustav III; King of Sweden r. 1771–1792; 1746–1792 | Charles XIII; King of Sweden r. 1809–1818; King of Norway r. 1814–1818; 1748–1818 | William; Duke of Oldenburg r. 1785–1823; 1754–1823 | Peter I Grand Duke of Oldenburg r. 1823–1829; 1755–1829
Paul I Emperor of Russia r. 1796–1801; 1754–1801 | Gustav IV Adolf; King of Sweden r. 1792–1809; 1778–1837 | Augustus; Grand Duke of Oldenburg r. 1829–1853; 1783–1853
Alexander I Emperor of Russia r. 1801–1825; 1777–1825 | Nicholas I Emperor of Russia r. 1825–1855; 1796–1855 | Peter II; Grand Duke of Oldenburg r. 1853–1900; 1827–1900
Alexander II the Liberator; Emperor of Russia r. 1855–1881; 1818–1881 | Frederick; Augustus II; Grand Duke of Oldenburg r. 1900–1918; 1852–1931
Alexander III the Peacemaker; Emperor of Russia r. 1881–1894; 1845–1894
Nicholas II; Emperor of Russia r. 1894–1917; 1868–1918

== See also ==
- List of consorts of Holstein-Gottorp
- House of Holstein-Gottorp (Swedish line) — Swedish kings
- House of Romanov — Russian Emperors
- House of Glücksburg — Danish, Greek and Norwegian kings and queens
- House of Oldenburg
