= Charles Frederick, Duke of Holstein-Gottorp =

Duke of Holstein-Gottorp from 1702 to 1739

Charles Frederick
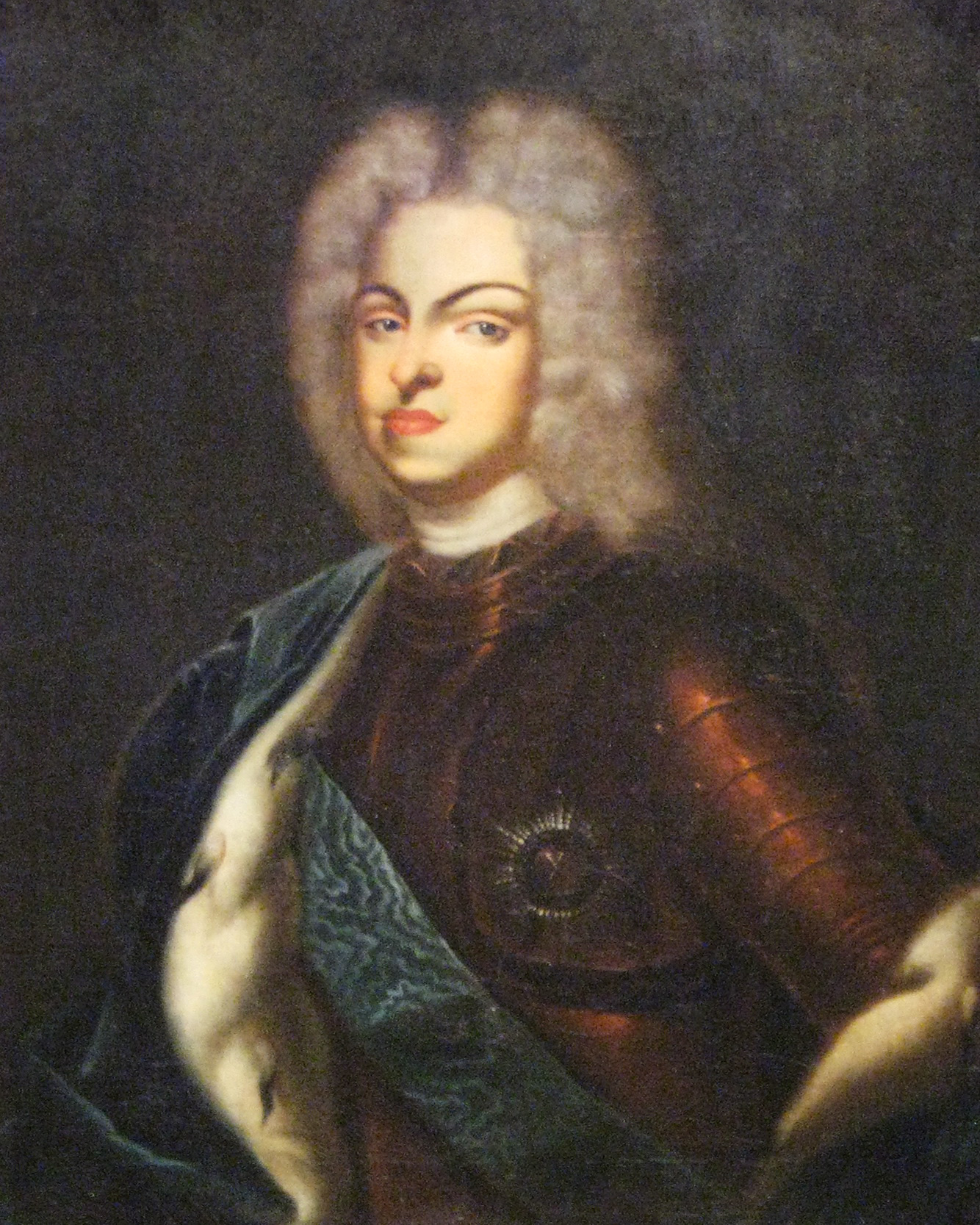

Duke of Holstein-Gottorp
- Reign: 19 July 1702 – 18 June 1739
- Predecessor: Frederick IV
- Successor: Charles Peter Ulrich
- Born: 30 April 1700; Stockholm, Sweden
- Died: 18 June 1739 (aged 39); Rohlfshagen, Schleswig-Holstein
- Burial: Cloister Church, Bordesholm
- Spouse: Grand Duchess Anna Petrovna of Russia (m. 1725; died 1728)
- Issue: Peter III of Russia
- House: Schleswig-Holstein-Gottorp
- Father: Frederick IV, Duke of Holstein-Gottorp
- Mother: Hedvig Sophia of Sweden

Charles Frederick, Duke of Schleswig-Holstein-Gottorp (German: Karl Friedrich, Herzog von Schleswig-Holstein-Gottorp) (30 April 1700 – 18 June 1739) was a Prince of Sweden and Duke of Schleswig-Holstein-Gottorp and an important member of European royalty. His dynasty, that of the dukes of Schleswig-Holstein-Gottorp, was a cadet branch of the ancient House of Oldenburg, which at that time was ruling Denmark–Norway. His mother was a sister of Charles XII of Sweden. Charles Frederick married a daughter of Peter the Great and became the father of the future Peter III of Russia. As such, he is the progenitor of the Russian imperial house of Holstein-Gottorp-Romanov and the patrilineal ancestor of all Russian emperors starting with Peter III, except for Catherine II.

== Early life ==
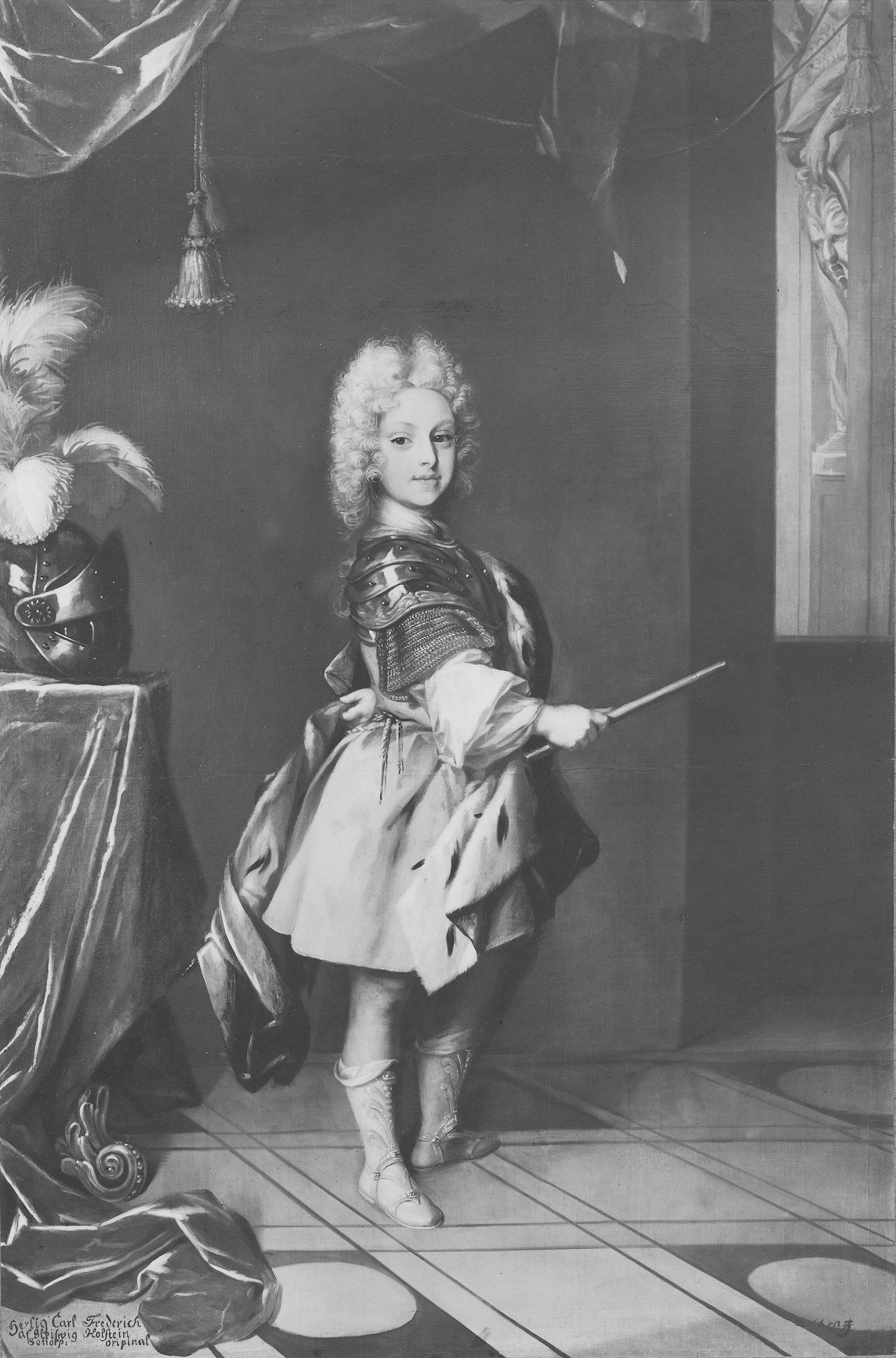
Charles Frederick as a child

Charles Frederick was born in Sweden, the son of Frederick IV of Schleswig-Holstein-Gottorp and his consort, Hedvig Sophia, daughter of King Charles XI of Sweden. He became reigning duke in infancy, upon his father's death in 1702 at the Battle of Kliszów, co-ruling, however under guardianship till 1717, with his father's cousin King Frederick IV of Denmark in the Duchy of Holstein, a Holy Roman imperial fief, and the Duchy of Schleswig, a Danish fief, there as a vassal to the Danish-Norwegian king. All his life he was a legitimate claimant to the throne of Sweden, as pro forma heir to Charles XII, who was his maternal uncle.

Charles Frederick's parents had been offered refuge by maternal uncle, Charles XII of Sweden, during the outbreak of the Great Northern War, and they resided in Stockholm. Charles Frederick succeeded to the dukedom at the age of two, upon the death of his father in the Battle of Kliszów. His mother became his regent, and they continued to reside in Stockholm. Actual daily co-rule in the Duchies of Schleswig and Holstein was left to administrators. His mother is said to have raised him tenderly but firmly, but she died in 1708, when Charles Frederick was only eight years old. He was then placed in the care of his great-grandmother (his mother's paternal grandmother), Queen Dowager Hedwig Eleonora of Schleswig-Holstein-Gottorp, who reportedly spoiled him terribly, resulting in making him passive and indolent. His mother, and later Hedwig Eleonora, both supported and worked for his right to be considered heir of Sweden after his childless uncle.

Since his guardians sided with Sweden against Denmark-Norway in the Great Northern War, Danish troops ravaged the Gottorp ducal share in the duchies during that war and conquered its northern portions in 1713, including the ancestral ducal seat Gottorp castle near Schleswig city in the homonymous duchy. In 1721 Frederick IV of Denmark-Norway, being the liege lord in Danish Schleswig who had enfeoffed Charles Frederick with the ducal title in Schleswig in 1702, officially withdrew this fief.

== Swedish career ==
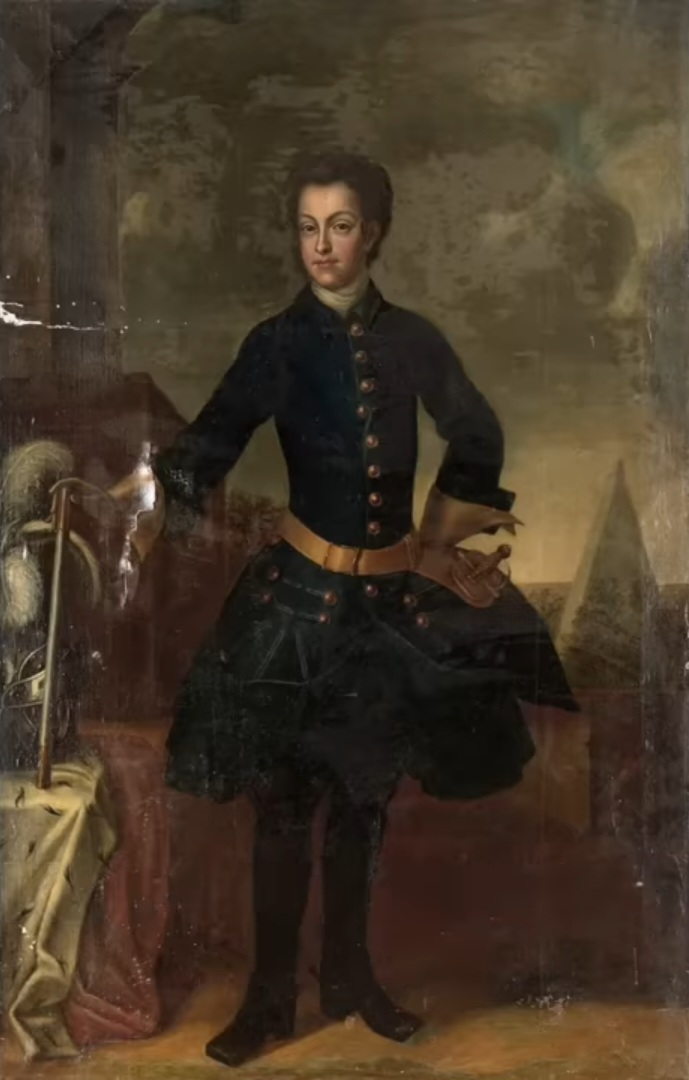
Portrait of Charles Frederick from the early 1720s by David von Krafft

Charles Frederick met his uncle Charles XII for the first time in 1716. He was declared of legal majority in 1717, and was then given some military responsibility. Charles Frederick was in a tense relationship to his aunt Ulrika Eleonora, whose followers pointed him out to be too rude and arrogant and in lack of any sense of responsibility to be a suitable heir to the throne.

Upon the death in 1718 of his maternal uncle and second cousin, Charles XII of Sweden, Duke Charles Frederick was presented as claimant to the throne. However, his aunt Ulrika Eleonora the Younger managed to wrest the throne for herself, claiming that her elder sister had not "acquired the consent of the Parliamentary Estates" for her marriage to his father, according to laws of succession laid down in Norrköpings arvförening. The duke's party asserted that the absolute monarchy in Sweden, which his grandfather King Charles XI had created, made that marriage clause irrelevant. Upon the news of the death of his uncle, he was reportedly too grief-stricken to take any action. Ulrika Eleonora's husband Frederick I, however, who was also present with him in Tistedalen, rushed to assist her in claiming the throne. When Charles Frederick was confronted with Ulrika Eleonora, he was forced by Arvid Horn to greet her as queen. He asked to be granted the title Royal Highness and to be recognised as her heir, but when her husband instead was given the title, he left Sweden in 1719. In 1723, he was granted the title Royal Highness in his absence, but his pro-Russian policy made him impossible as heir to the Swedish throne.

Charles Frederick withdrew from Sweden, eventually settling in Russia, where in May 1725 he married Grand Duchess Anna Petrovna, elder daughter of Tsar Peter the Great. Meanwhile, the so-called Holstein Party in Sweden continued to advance Charles Frederick's claims. The party made preparations and awaited the childless Ulrika Eleonora's death, but Charles Frederick died before his aunt and left his claims to his infant son. By this time however, Sweden had enacted new laws of succession which specifically excluded Charles Frederick and his heirs because of their Russian politics, because at that time, Russia and Sweden had a strained relationship. The exclusion of Charles Frederick and his progeny from the Swedish succession avoided the personal union of Sweden and Russia, because Charles Frederick's only child would become Tsar Peter III of Russia.

The question then became who was to become the next king of Sweden after the death of the childless incumbent. The so-called "Hat faction" in Sweden managed to elect Charles Frederick's first cousin Adolph Frederick, who was his father's younger brother's son and thus belonged to the same Oldenburg dynasty, as Crown Prince of Sweden.

== Later life ==
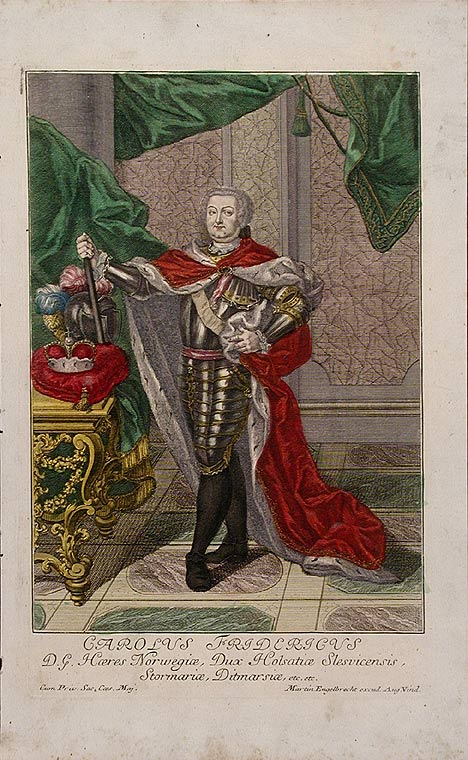
Coloured engraving by Martin Engelbrecht from 1745

Charles Frederick left for Hamburg, as the Gottorp ducal share in the duchies of German Holstein and Danish Schleswig had been occupied by Denmark since 1713. Having lost the title as duke of Schleswig, succeeded to have the occupation of the ducal share in German Holstein removed by application to his Holstein liege lord, the Holy Roman Emperor. In 1720, Sweden and Denmark-Norway concluded the Treaty of Frederiksborg, in which Sweden pledged to cease its support of the House of [Schleswig-]Holstein-Gottorp. Duke Charles Frederick opposed the treaty, made by a Swedish government which he regarded as rebellious against his own right to the Swedish succession; the treaty also made virtually impossible the regaining of his lost ducal share in the northern duchy of Schleswig. (This was to be a motivation for his son Peter in 1762, upon his Russian accession, to start preparations for the use of Russian troops to reconquer the lost lands from Denmark-Norway.)

Duke Charles Frederick was married to Anna Petrovna, Tsesarevna of Russia and elder daughter of Tsar Peter I and Marta Skavronskaya (who would later become Empress Catherine I of Russia). As Charles was the Swedish heir, Peter saw the marriage as politically useful. Charles Frederick was officially engaged to Anna by Tsar Peter. After the death of Peter in 1725, he was given a place in the council, his own court, palace and income by Catherine I of Russia and married to Anna. Anna was not enthusiastic about the marriage, because of his reputation of consorting with prostitutes.

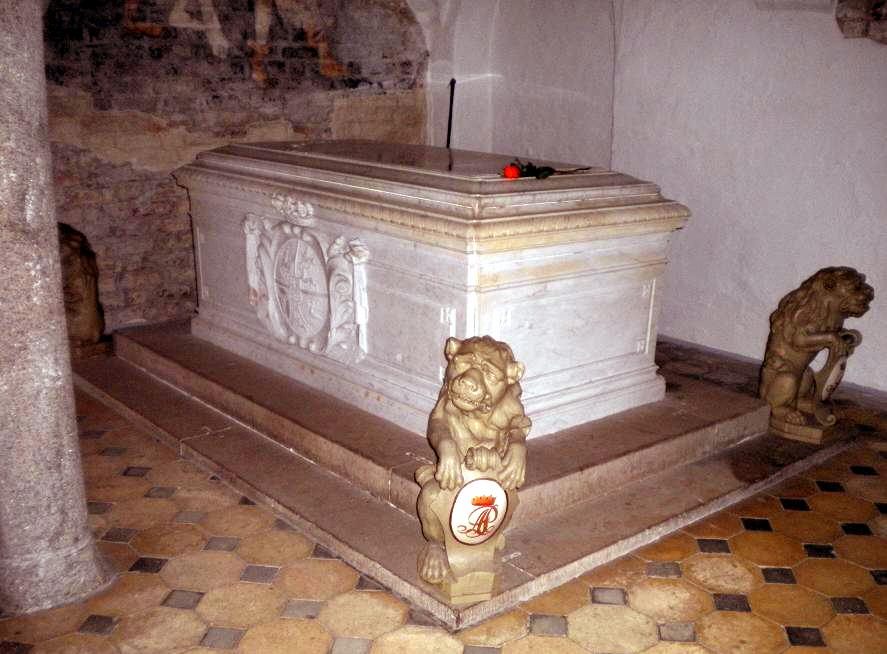
Charles Frederick's grave at Bordesholm

Charles Frederick, then commander of the palace guard in St. Petersburg, attempted to secure his wife's succession to the Russian throne upon the death in 1727 of her mother, the Empress Catherine I of Russia. His attempt failed, but his son by Duchess Anna Petrovna, Charles Peter Ulrich (who - as Duke of Holstein-Gottorp - succeeded in the ducal share of Holstein in 1739), eventually became Russian tsar in 1762, as Peter III.

Charles Frederick and Anna left for the Gottorp ducal share of Holstein in 1727, taking residence in Kiel Castle, where Anna died following the birth of their son in 1728. Charles Frederick spent the rest of his life in Holstein-Gottorp at Kiel. His prime concern was to secure his son's succession to the Russian throne. He did support his followers in Sweden also, but did not pay much attention to Holstein-Gottorp. Before a member of the family of Holstein-Gottorp was to sit on either the Swedish or the Russian throne, Duke Charles Frederick died in 1739 in Rohlfshagen, today part of the town of Rümpel. His grave is in the Cloister Church at Bordesholm.

== Ancestors ==
Ancestors of Charles Frederick, Duke of Holstein-Gottorp

8. Frederick III, Duke of Holstein-Gottorp
4. Christian Albert, Duke of Holstein-Gottorp
9. Marie Elisabeth of Saxony
2. Frederick IV, Duke of Holstein-Gottorp
10. Frederick III of Denmark
5. Frederikke Amalie of Denmark
11. Sophie Amalie of Brunswick-Lüneburg
1. Charles Frederick, Duke of Holstein-Gottorp
12. Charles X Gustav of Sweden
6. Charles XI of Sweden
13. Hedwig Eleonora of Holstein-Gottorp
3. Hedvig Sophia of Sweden
14. Frederick III of Denmark (=10)
7. Ulrike Eleonora of Denmark
15. Sophie Amalie of Brunswick-Lüneburg (=11)

Charles Frederick, Duke of Holstein-Gottorp House of Holstein-Gottorp Cadet branch of the House of Oldenburg Born: 30 April 1700 Died: 18 June 1739
Danish nobility
Preceded by Frederick IV of Holstein-Gottorp and Frederick IV of Denmark as co-rulers	Duke of Schleswig; 1702–1713 with Frederick IV of Denmark	Succeeded by Frederick IV of Denmark as sole ruler
German nobility
Preceded by Frederick IV of Holstein-Gottorp and Frederick IV of Denmark as co-rulers	Duke of Holstein; 1702–1739 with Frederick IV of Denmark (1702–1730); Christian VI of Denmark (1730–1739)	Succeeded by Charles Peter Ulrich and Christian VI of Denmark as co-rulers
