= Grand Duchess Anna Petrovna of Russia =

Duchess of Holstein-Gottorp from 1725 to 1728

Grand Duchess Anna Petrovna
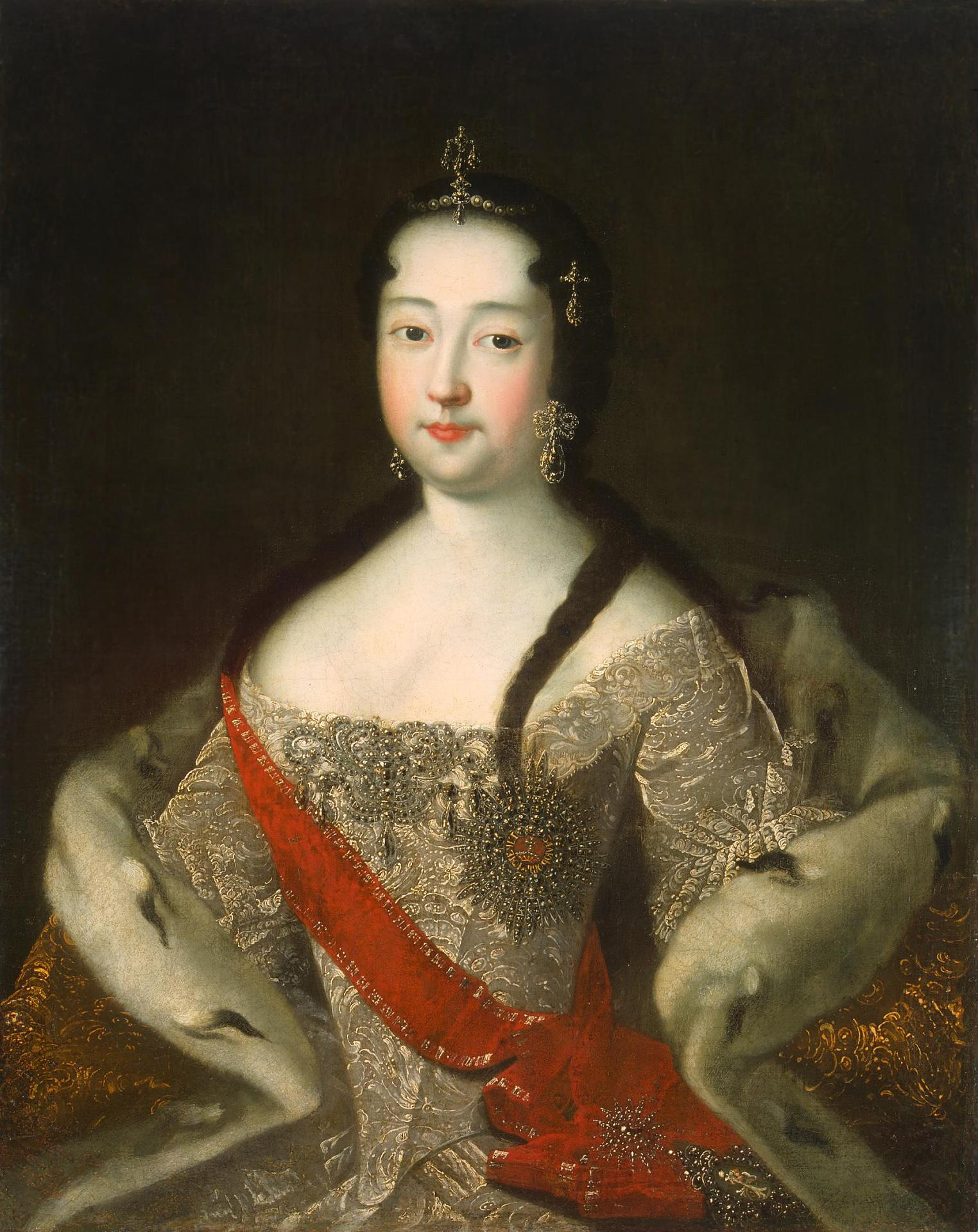
- Portrait by Ivan Adolsky, after 1721

Duchess consort of Holstein-Gottorp
- Tenure: 21 May 1725 – 4 March 1728
- Born: 27 January 1708; Moscow, Russia
- Died: 4 March 1728 (aged 20); Kiel, Duchy of Holstein-Gottorp, Holy Roman Empire
- Burial: Peter and Paul Cathedral
- Spouse: Charles Frederick I, Duke of Holstein-Gottorp (m. 1725)
- Issue: Peter III of Russia
Names
- Anna Petrovna Romanova; Russian: Анна Петровна Романова
- House: Romanov
- Father: Peter I of Russia
- Mother: Catherine I of Russia

Grand Duchess Anna Petrovna of Russia (Russian: Анна Петровна; 7 February [O.S. 27 January] 1708 – 15 March [O.S. 4 March] 1728) was the eldest daughter of Emperor Peter I of Russia and Empress Catherine I. Her younger sister, Empress Elizabeth, ruled between 1741 and 1762 and her son Peter III became Emperor in 1762, succeeding Elizabeth. She was Duchess Consort of Holstein-Gottorp by marriage. She was born in Moscow and died in Kiel in her youth at the age of 20.

== Early life ==
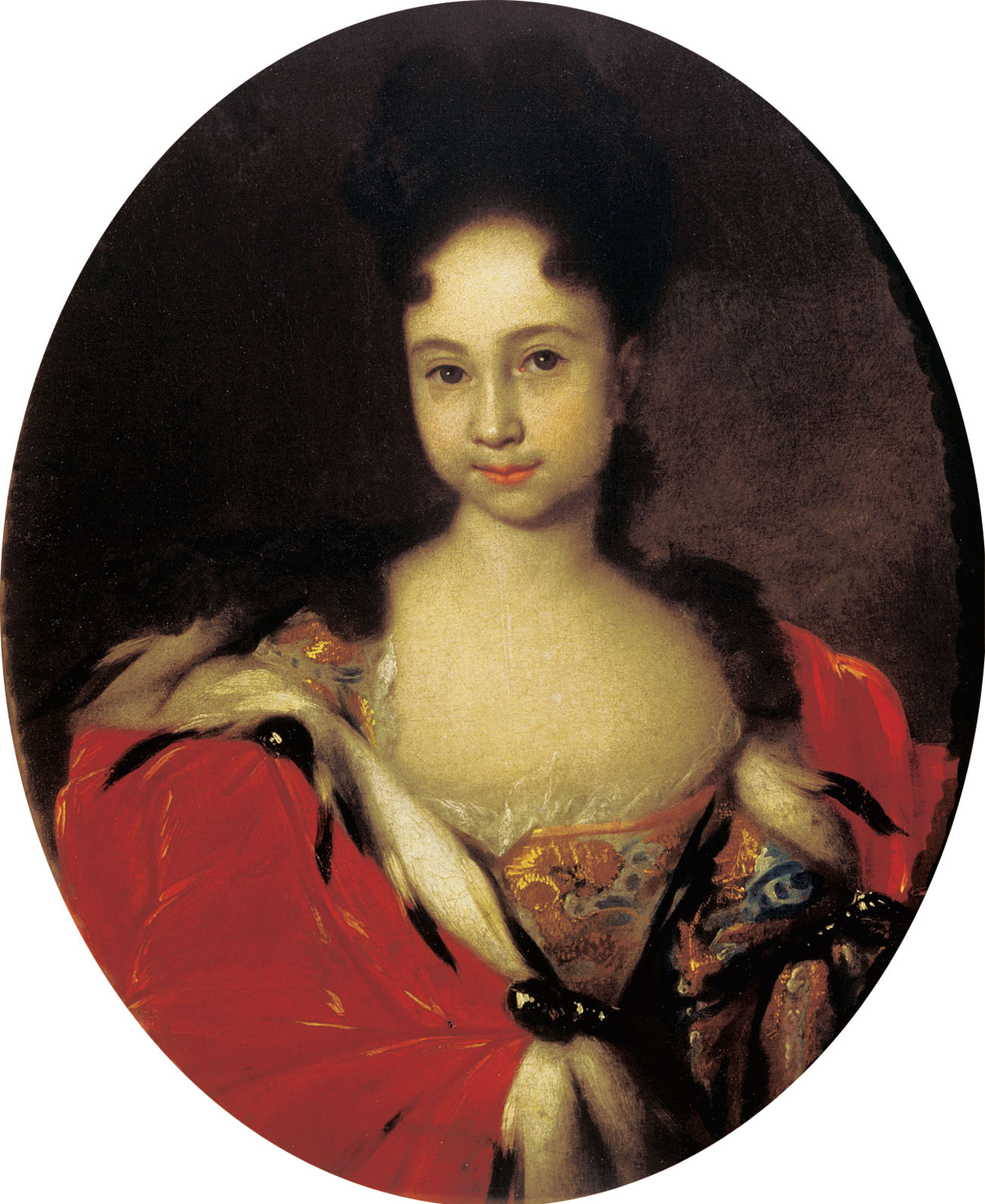
Anna as a child painted by Nikitin, Tretyakov Gallery, Moscow

Born in Moscow, Russia, on 27 January 1708, Anna Petrovna was the fourth child of the future Catherine I of Russia and Peter the Great. Although Anna was the fourth child and second daughter born to the couple, none of her older siblings survived infancy. In 1709, Anna was joined by a sister, Elizabeth, who eventually became Empress of Russia. Anna and Elizabeth were born out of wedlock, although their parents were married in 1712 and they were later legitimized. Their earlier illegitimacy would pose great challenges for their marriages.

Anna grew up in the houses of Peter's younger sister Natalia and Prince Alexander Menshikov. Although born illegitimate, she and her younger sister Elizabeth were awarded the titles of "princess" (tsarevna) on 6 March 1711 and "crown princess" (tsesarevna) on 23 December 1721.

Peter planned to marry his daughters to foreign princes in order to gain European allies for the Russian Empire. The two girls were educated with this aim in mind, learning literature, writing, embroidery, dancing and etiquette. Anna developed into an intelligent, well-read girl who spoke four foreign languages – French, German, Italian and Swedish.

Anna's shyness was evident at an early age. One witness describes the amusing hitch that once occurred during the traditional exchanging of Easter kisses. When the duke of Holstein-Gottorp tried to kiss the fourteen-year-old Anna, she turned bright red in embarrassment, while her younger sister "immediately stuck out her little pink mouth for a kiss."

Foreign visitors to the Russian court were struck by the uncommon beauty of Anna. The dark-eyed Anna looked more like her father and was considered more level-headed and intelligent than her younger sister, the fair-haired Elizabeth. A contemporary described Anna: "She was a beautiful soul in a beautiful body... both in appearance and in manners, she was [her father's] complete likeness, particularly in her character and mind... set off by her kind heart."

== Marriage ==
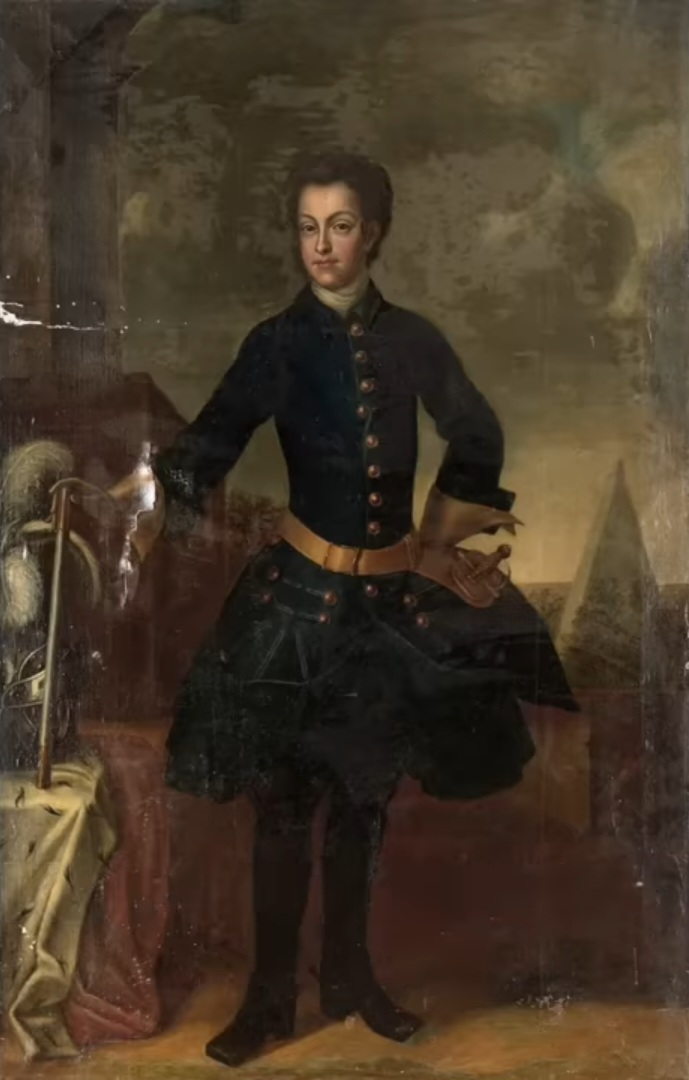
Anna's husband, Charles Frederick, painted by David von Krafft, 1720s

On 17 March 1721, Karl Friedrich arrived in Imperial Russia to get acquainted with his future wife and father-in-law. He aspired to use the marriage in order to ensure Russia's support for his plans of retrieving Schleswig from Denmark. He also entertained hopes of being backed up by Russia in his claims to the Swedish throne. Under the terms of the Treaty of Nystad Russia promised not to interfere in the internal affairs of Sweden, so his hopes proved ill-founded.

Another possible candidate as a husband was Prince Louis d’Orléans, Duke of Orléans, a son of Prince Philippe II d’Orléans, Duke of Orléans, and his wife Madame Françoise Marie de Bourbon (an illegitimate daughter of King Louis XIV of France and his Chief Mistress, Madame de Montespan). The marriage proposal was ignored due to a difference in style of address. Anna was addressed as Her Imperial Highness and Louis was as His Serene Highness.

As a favorite child of Peter the Great, Anna's name day (3 February) was taken to be a national holiday in 1724.

On 22 November 1724, the marriage contract was signed between Karl Friedrich and Peter. By this contract, Anna and Karl Friedrich renounced all rights and claims to the crown of the Russian Empire on behalf of themselves and their descendants. However a secret clause allowed the Emperor to name a successor out of any issue from the marriage. As a result of this clause, the Emperor secured the right to name any of his descendants as his successor on the Russian throne.

A few months thereafter, by January 1725, Peter the Great fell mortally ill. As the story goes, on his deathbed he managed to spell the words: to give all..., but could not continue further and sent for Anna to dictate his last will to her. By the time the princess arrived, the Emperor could not pronounce a single word. Based on the story, some historians speculated that Peter's wish was to leave the throne to Anna, but this is not confirmed.

== Catherine I ==
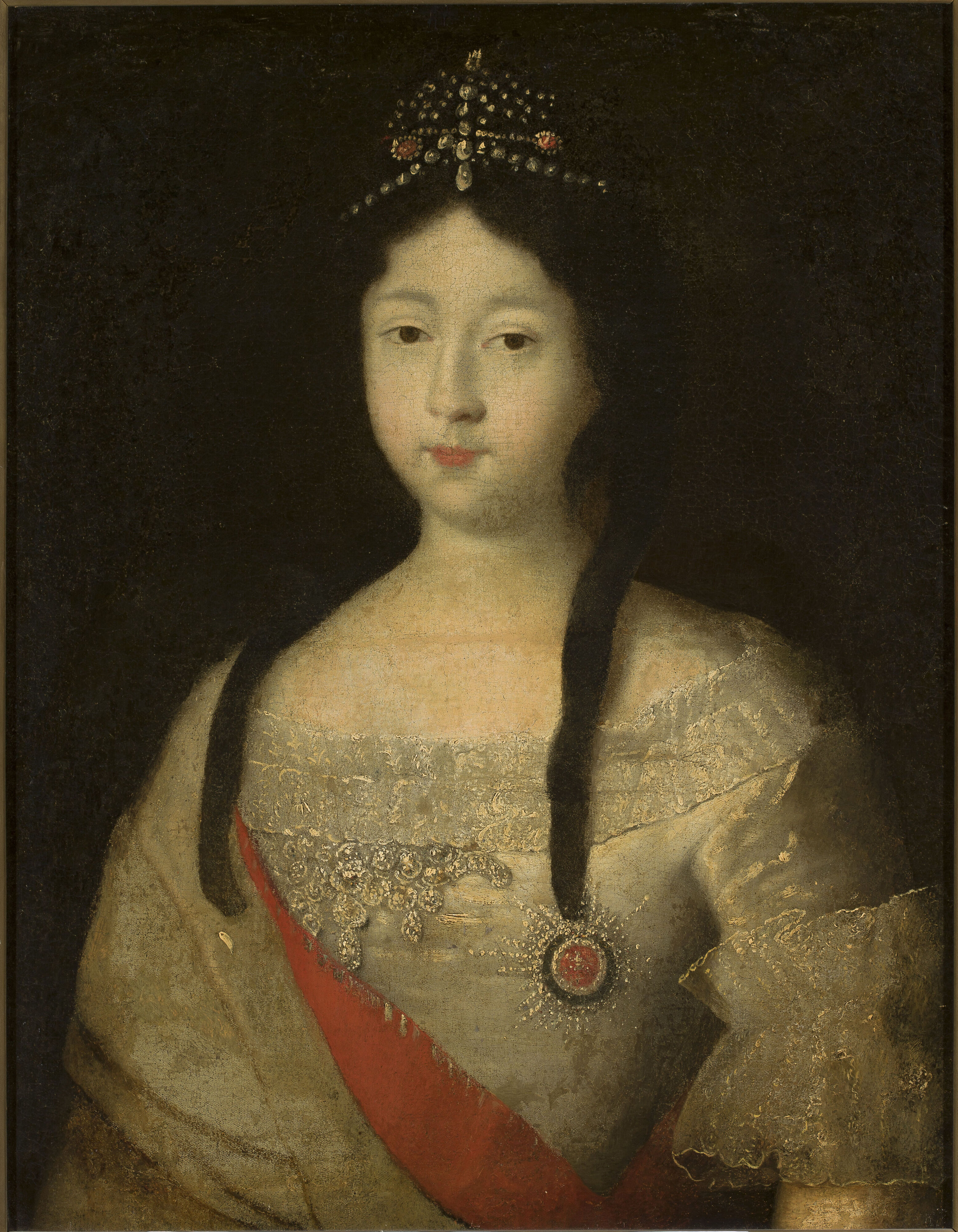
Portrait by Louis Caravaque, 1720s, National Museum in Warsaw

After the accession of her mother Catherine I, a grand wedding was held for Anna in Trinity Cathedral, Saint Petersburg on 21 May 1725. The wedding party then crossed the River Neva to the Summer Garden, where Mikhail Zemtsov had designed a special banqueting hall for the occasion.

The tables were set with all sorts of delicacies, including enormous pies. When the orchestra began to play, male and female dwarves jumped out of the pies and began to dance on the tables. Each toast was accompanied by cannon fire from a nearby yacht and the guards regiments positioned on Tsaritsa Meadow. The following day, everyone was invited to Peterhof, where the banqueting and dancing continued in the Upper Palace.

Carl Friedrich and Anna spent the next two years in Saint Petersburg. Catherine I made her son-in-law a lieutenant colonel of the Preobrazhensky Regiment and a member of the Supreme Privy Council. He began to play an important role in the life of the Russian Empire and foreign diplomats predicted that the empress would name Anna as her successor.

The Duke was admitted into the newly established Supreme Secret Council and exerted a moderate influence on Russian politics. Catherine I's death in 1727 made his position precarious, as the power shifted to the hands of Alexander Menshikov, who aspired to marry the young emperor, Peter II, to his own daughter, Maria Menshikov. A quarrel between the Duke and Menshikov resulted in the former's withdrawing to Holstein on 25 July 1727.

Before her departure for Holstein, Anna was asked to sign a receipt for all the money awarded to her as her dowry. For a long time, the document was not accepted by the government, because it gave the old title of Peter's daughter – Tsesarevna (crown princess of Russia). Now, she was not the Crown Princess.

== Kiel ==
On 25 July 1727, Anna and her husband left Saint Petersburg for Kiel. When they arrived in the capital of Holstein, the duke underwent a personality change. Merry and gallant in Saint Petersburg, he was now a rude, drunken boor. He spent his time in the rowdy company of friends and other women, leaving his wife, now pregnant, entirely on her own.

In Kiel, Anna would spend her days writing long, tearful letters to her sister Elizabeth. Semyon Mordvinov, a lieutenant in the Russian navy, remembers Anna crying bitterly when she gave him her mail to take back to Russia. In one such letter to Elizabeth, she writes: "Not a day passes without my weeping for you, my dear sister!”

== Death ==
On 21 February 1728, Anna gave birth in Kiel Castle to a son named Carl Peter Ulrich, the future Peter III of Russia. Peter would found the House of Holstein-Gottorp-Romanov that would go on to rule Russia until the early 20th-century. A few days after his birth, the barely twenty-year-old duchess caught puerperal fever and died on 4 March 1728. In memory of his wife, Karl Friedrich founded the Order of St Anna, which subsequently became a Russian decoration.

Before her death, Anna Petrovna had asked to be buried alongside her father in Saint Petersburg. Two ships, the Raphael and the Cruiser, were dispatched to Kiel for Anna's body. The coffin was transported up the River Neva on a galley, with long black crêpe hanging overboard, trailing in the water. On 12 November 1728, Anna was laid to rest next to her parents in the still unfinished St Peter and St Paul Cathedral.

== Issue ==
Through her marriage with the Duke Karl Friedrich, she had one son

- Prince Peter Feodorovich, Hereditary Duke of Holstein-Gottorp (21 February 1728 – 17 July 1762). In 1739, Peter's father died, and he became The Duke of Holstein-Gottorp as Karl Peter Ulrich. He could thus be considered the heir to both thrones (Russia and Sweden). After the death of his aunt, Elizabeth of Russia, he ruled over the Russian Empire as Peter III, Emperor and Autocrat of All the Russias and was the husband of Catherine the Great of Russia. Through him, Anna became ancestress to all subsequent rulers of Russia except Catherine the Great (her daughter-in-law).

== Legacy ==
- The Order of Saint Anna (Russian: Орден святой Анны) was a Holstein and then Russian order of chivalry established by Anna's husband on 14 February 1735, in honour of Anna. The motto of the Order was "Amantibus Justitiam, Pietatem, Fidem" ("To those who Love Justice, Piety and Fidelity"). Its festival day was 3 February.

== Gallery ==
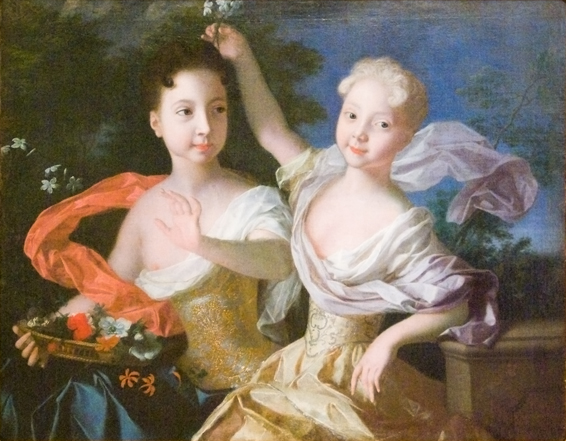
Anna with her sister, Grand Duchess Elizabeth

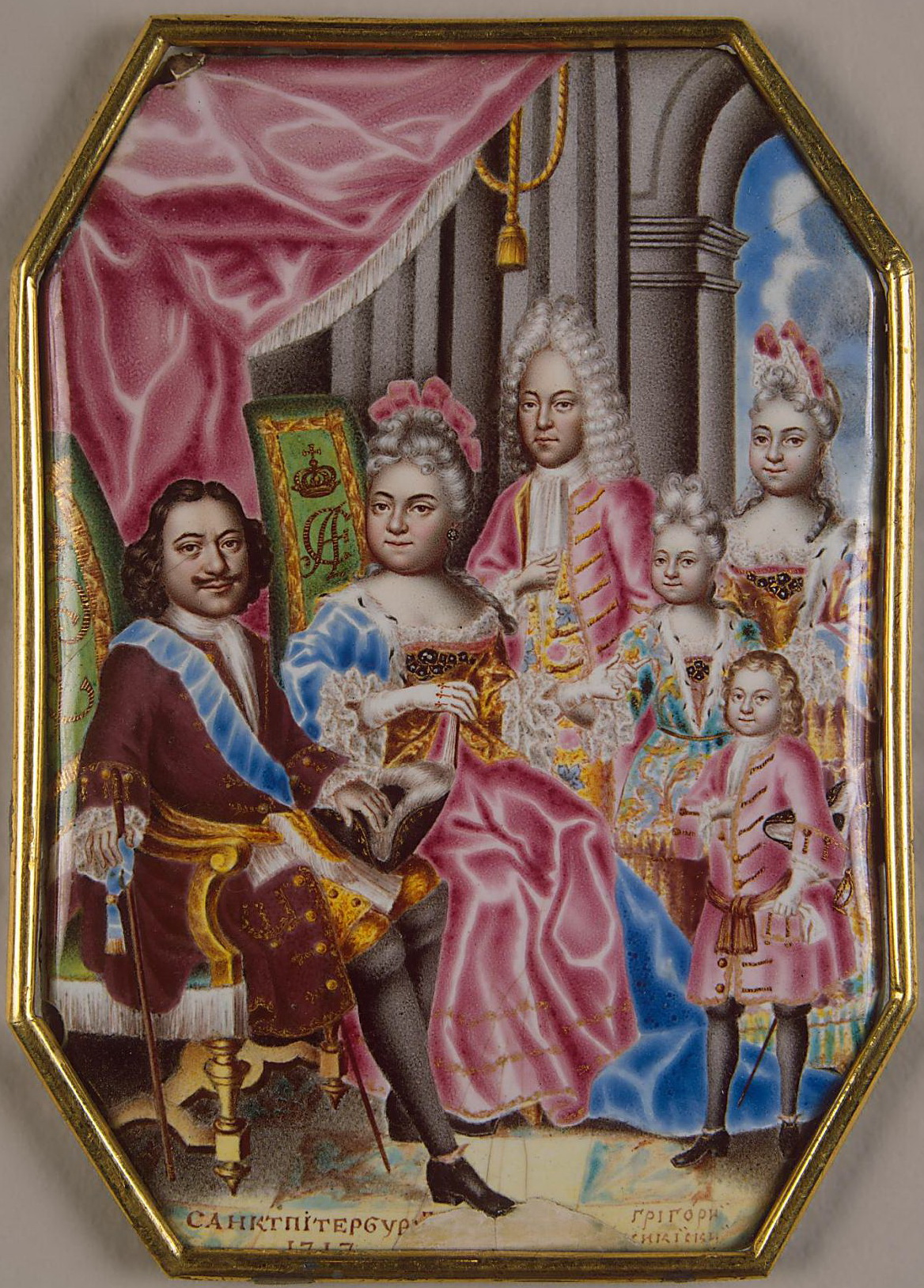
Peter I; Catherine I; Alexei, Tsarevich of Russia; Anna behind her sister Elizabeth and Peter Petrovich (1715 – 1719)

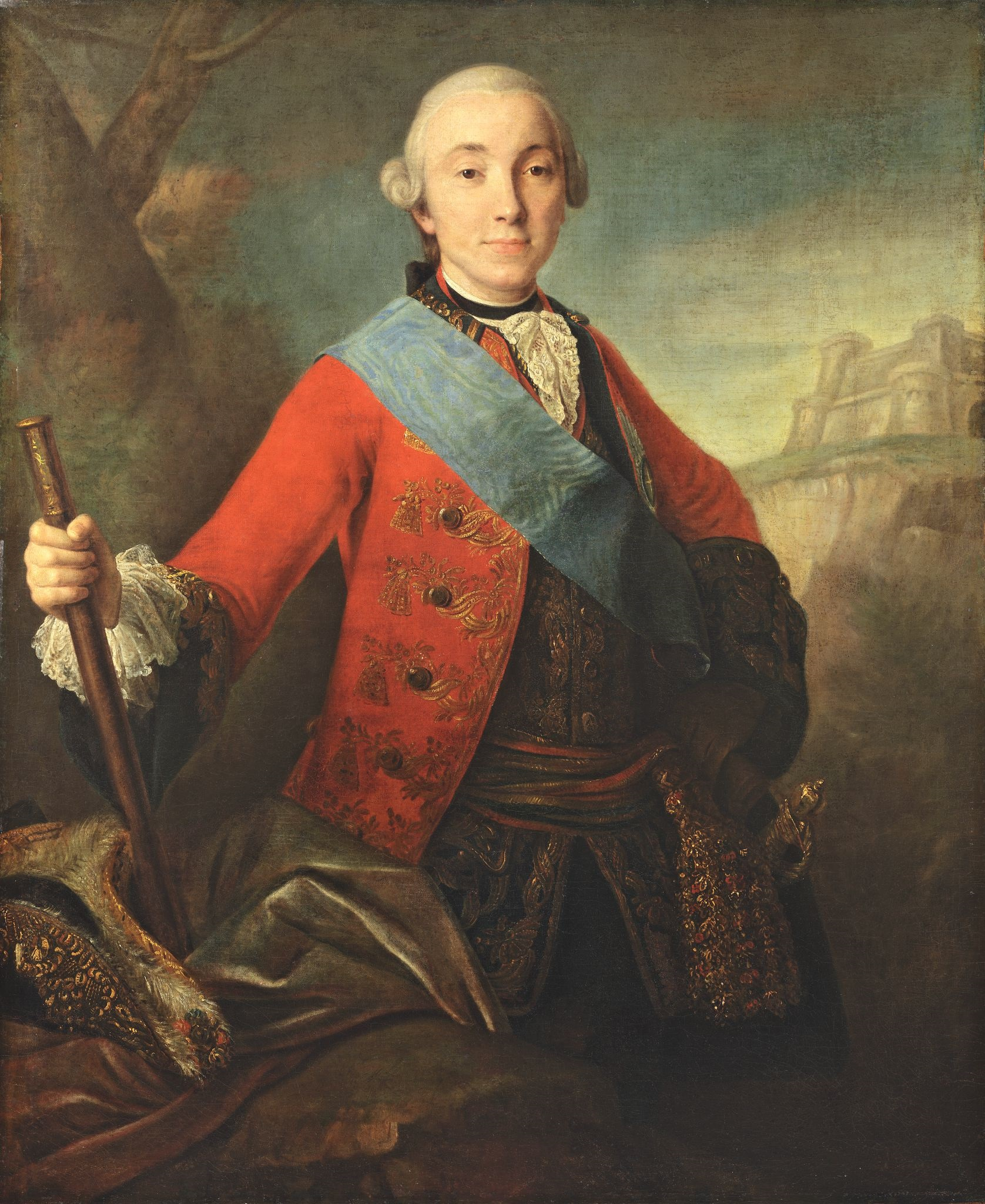
Anna's only child, the future Peter III of Russia

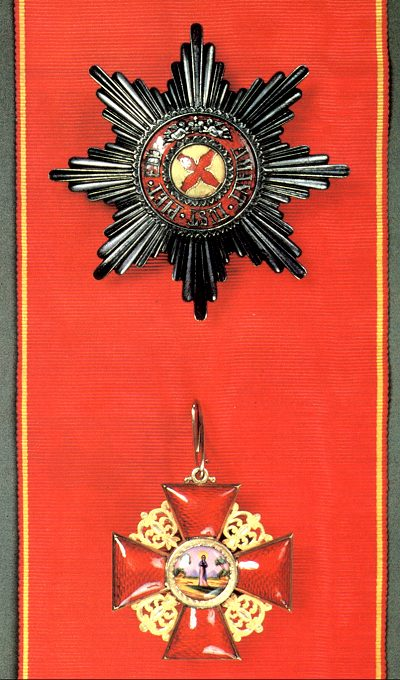
The Order of Saint Anna First Class

== Ancestry ==
Ancestors of Grand Duchess Anna Petrovna of Russia

8. Michael I of Russia
4. Alexis I of Russia
9. Yevdokiya Lukyanovna Streshnyova
2. Peter the Great, Tsar of all Russia
10. Kirill Poluektovich Naryshkin
5. Natalya Kirillovna Naryshkina
11. Anna Leontyevna Leontyeva
1. Grand Duchess Anna Petrovna of Russia
6. Samuel Skowroński
3. Catherine I of Russia
7. Elisabeth Moritz

== See also ==
- Family tree of Russian monarchs
- Order of Saint Anna

== Sources ==
- "Анна Петровна" . Brockhaus and Efron Encyclopedic Dictionary (in Russian). 1906.

Grand Duchess Anna Petrovna of Russia House of Romanov Born: 27 January 1708 Died: 4 March 1728
German royalty
Vacant Title last held by Princess Hedvig Sophia of Sweden	Duchess consort of Holstein-Gottorp; 1725-1728	Vacant Title next held by Princess Sophie of Anhalt-Zerbst (later Empress Catherine II the Great)
