= Peter III of Russia =

Emperor of Russia in 1762

Peter III
- Tsar
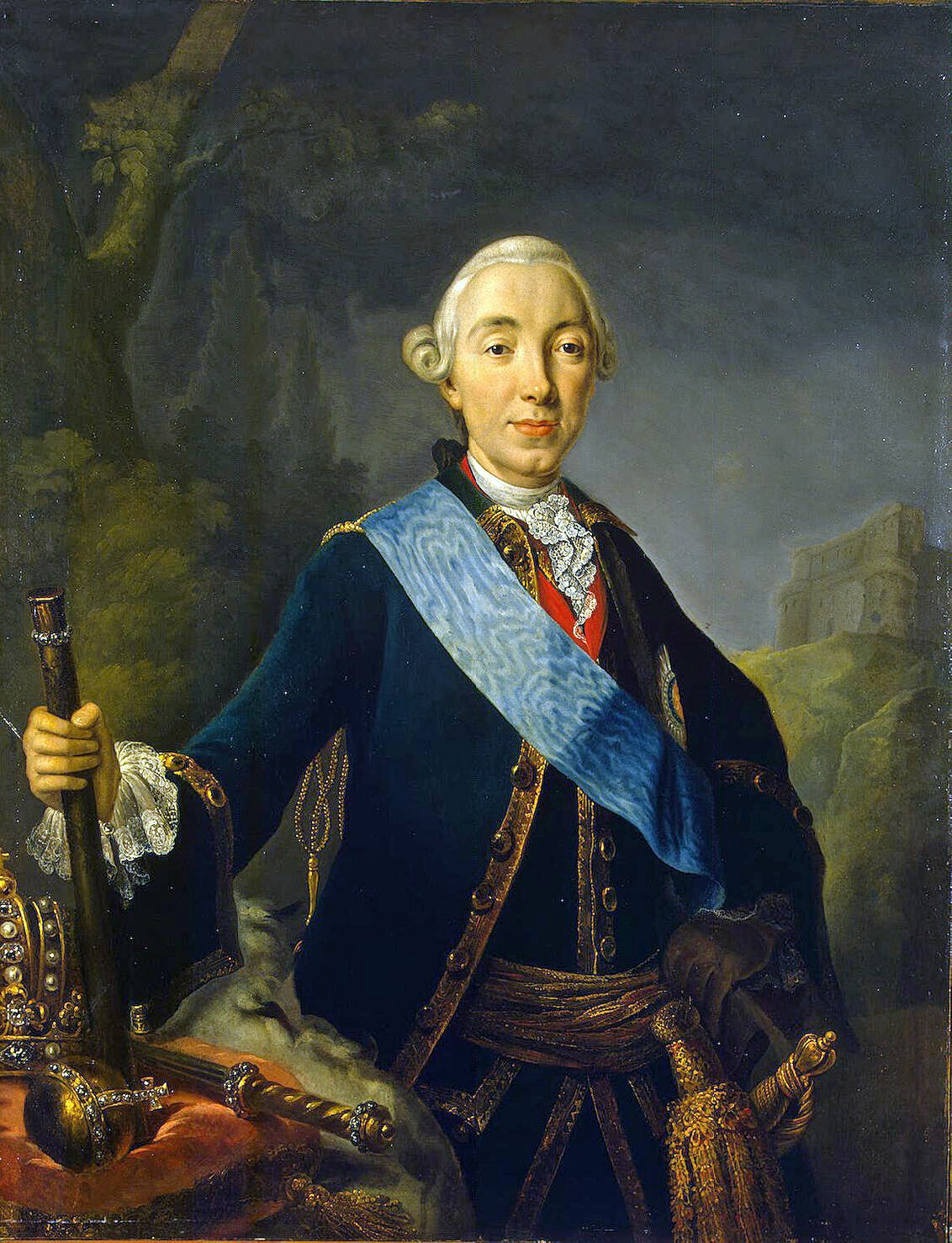
- Portrait by Lucas Conrad Pfandzelt, c. 1761

Emperor of Russia
- Reign: 5 January 1762 – 9 July 1762
- Predecessor: Elizabeth
- Successor: Catherine II

Duke of Holstein-Gottorp
- Reign: 18 June 1739 – 9 July 1762
- Predecessor: Charles Frederick
- Successor: Paul I
- Born: Karl Peter Ulrich of Schleswig-Holstein-Gottorp; 21 February 1728; Kiel, Holstein-Gottorp
- Died: 17 July 1762 (aged 34); Ropsha, Russia
- Burial: Alexander Nevsky Monastery (1762–1796); Saints Peter and Paul Cathedral, Saint Petersburg (since 1796)
- Spouse: Catherine the Great (m. 1745)
- Issue: Paul I; Grand Duchess Anna Petrovna
- House: Holstein-Gottorp-Romanov
- Father: Charles Frederick, Duke of Holstein-Gottorp
- Mother: Grand Duchess Anna Petrovna of Russia

Peter III Fyodorovich (Russian: Пётр III Фёдорович, romanized: Pyotr III Fyodorovich, born Charles Peter Ulrich of Schleswig-Holstein-Gottorp; 21 February 1728 – 17 July 1762) was Emperor of Russia from 5 January 1762 until 9 July of the same year, when his wife, Catherine II, overthrew him in a palace coup d'état. He implemented many notable reforms during his reign, though he is criticised for undoing Russian gains in the Seven Years' War by forming an alliance with Prussia.

Peter was the son of Duke Charles Frederick of Holstein-Gottorp, and Grand Duchess Anna Petrovna of Russia, who died of puerperal fever after childbirth. After succeeding to the throne of Holstein-Gottorp following his father’s death, Peter was made heir presumptive to both the Russian and Swedish thrones in 1742. Due to his conversion to Russian Orthodoxy, he was disqualified from becoming King of Sweden.

Peter married his paternal second cousin, Princess Sophie of Anhalt-Zerbst, who took the Orthodox name of Catherine Alexeievna, in 1745. They had one child who survived to adulthood, Paul Petrovich. Peter succeeded his maternal aunt as Emperor of Russia in 1762. After a 186-day reign, Peter III was overthrown by his wife, and soon died under unclear circumstances. The official cause proposed by Catherine's new government was that he died due to hemorrhoids. This explanation was met with skepticism, both in Russia and abroad, with notable critics such as Voltaire and d'Alembert expressing doubt about the plausibility of death from such a condition.

After Peter III's death, many impostors thrived, pretending to be him, the most famous of whom were Yemelyan Pugachev and the "Montenegerin Tsar Peter III" (Stephan the Little).

== Early life ==
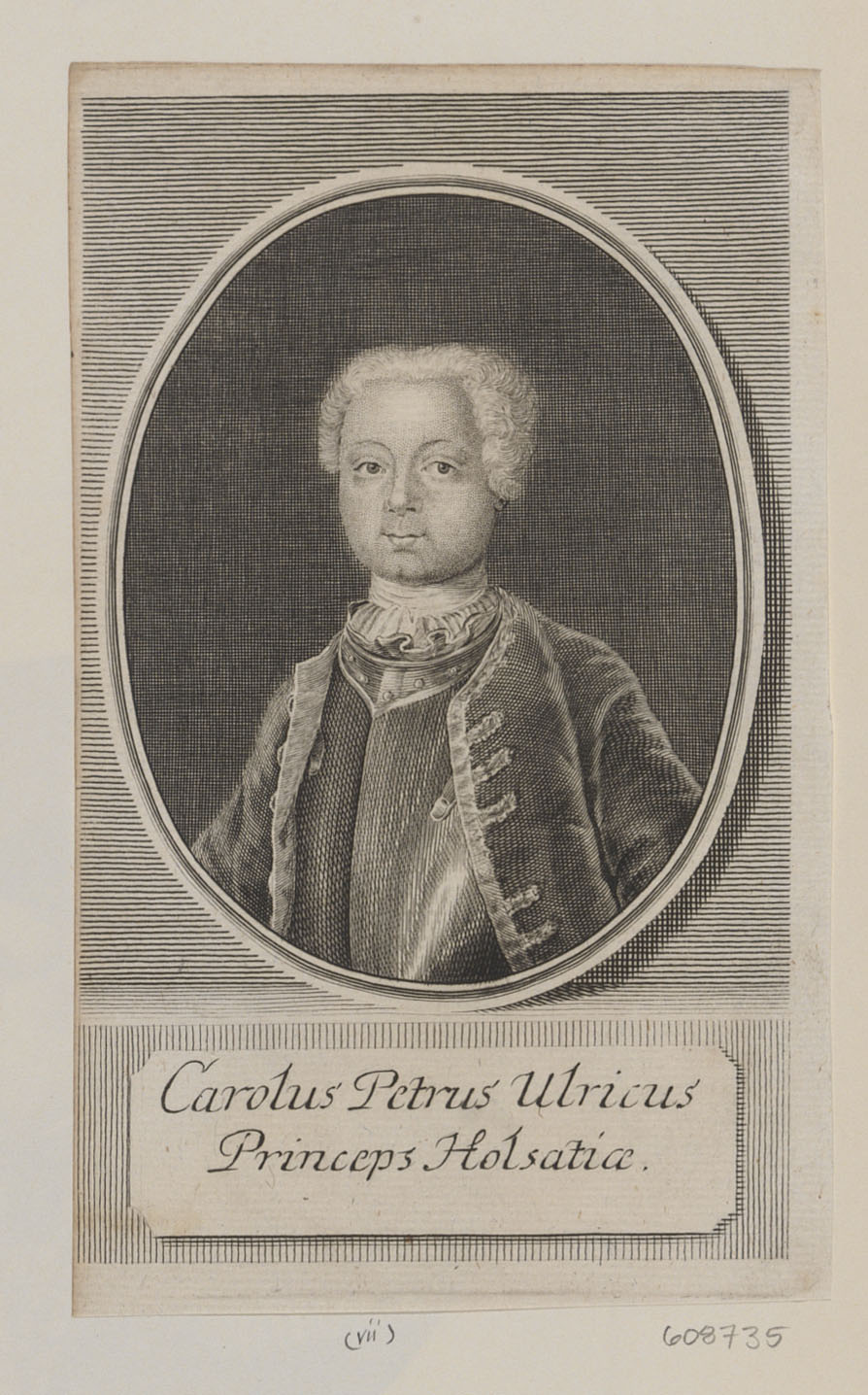
Engraving of Peter as a child in the 1730s.

Peter was born on 21 February 1728 in Kiel in the duchy of Holstein-Gottorp. His parents were Charles Frederick, Duke of Holstein-Gottorp, and Grand Duchess Anna Petrovna of Russia. Charles Frederick was a great-grandson of Charles XI of Sweden, and Anna was a daughter of the Russian monarchs Peter the Great and Catherine I. Peter's twenty-year-old mother died just a few weeks after his birth. In 1739, Peter's father also died, and the orphaned boy became Duke of Holstein-Gottorp as Charles Peter Ulrich (German: Karl Peter Ulrich) at the age of 11.

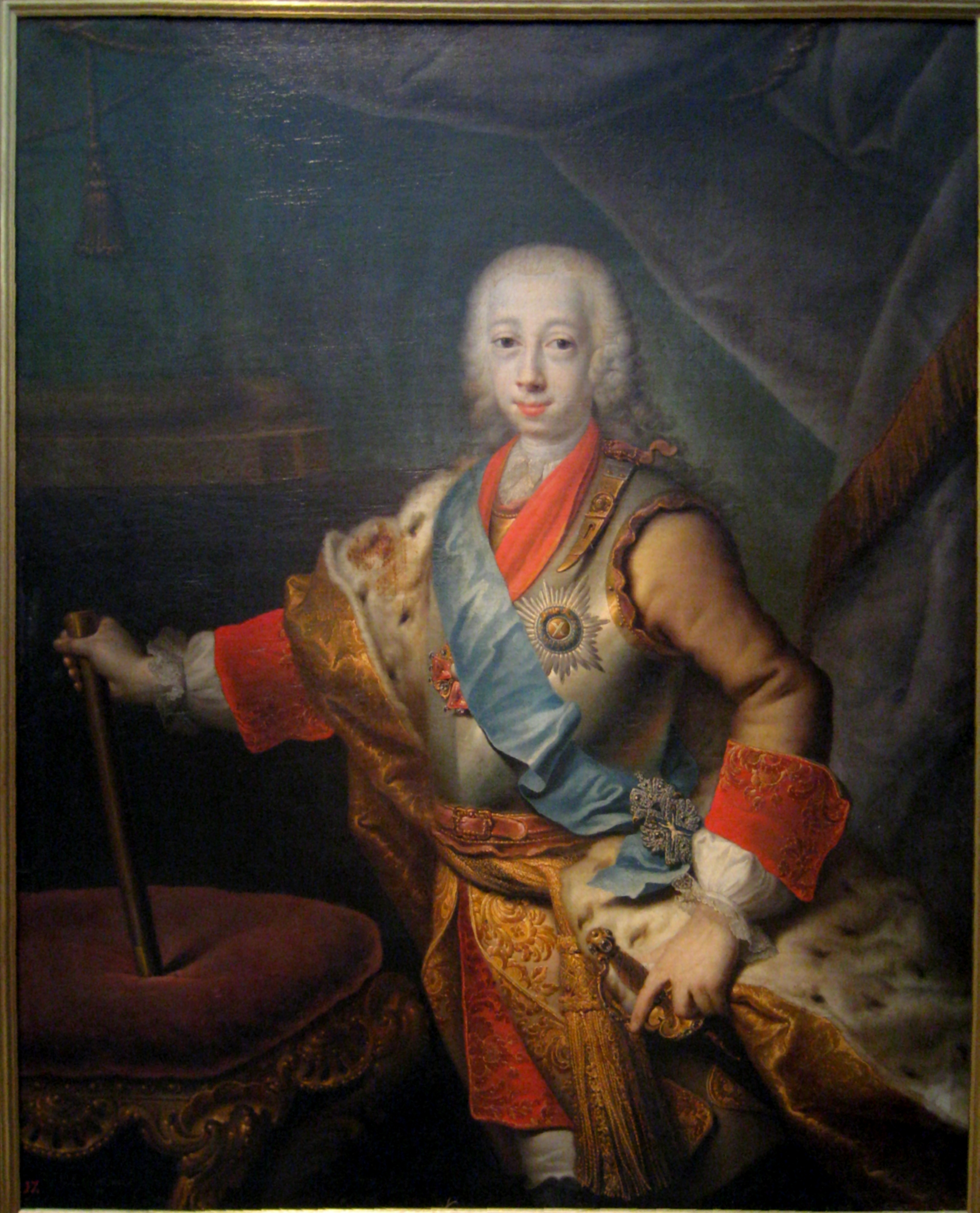
Portrait of Grand Duke Pyotr Feodorovich by Georg Christoph Grooth, 1743

Two years later, Peter's maternal aunt Elizabeth became Empress of Russia. As she had no children of her own, she brought Peter from Germany to Russia and proclaimed him her heir presumptive in the autumn of 1742. Previously in 1742, the 14-year-old Peter was proclaimed Grand Duke of Finland during the Russo-Swedish War (1741–1743), when Russian troops held Finland. This proclamation was based on his succession rights to territories held by his childless great-uncle, the late Charles XII of Sweden, who also had been Grand Duke of Finland. About the same time, in October 1742, he was chosen by the Swedish parliament to become heir presumptive to the Swedish throne. However, the Swedish parliament was unaware of the fact that he had also been proclaimed heir presumptive to the throne of Russia, and when their envoy arrived in Saint Petersburg in November, it was too late. Also in November, Peter converted to Eastern Orthodoxy under the name of Pyotr Feodorovich, and was created Grand Duke of Russia. The words "Grandson of Peter the Great" (Russian: внук Петра Великого, romanized: vnuk Petra Velikogo) were made an obligatory part of his official title, underscoring his dynastic claim to the Russian throne, and it was made a criminal offence to omit them.

Empress Elizabeth arranged for Peter to marry his second cousin, Sophia Augusta Frederica (later Catherine the Great), daughter of Christian August, Prince of Anhalt-Zerbst, and Princess Joanna Elisabeth of Holstein-Gottorp. Only a few weeks before this arrangement, Peter, aged sixteen, had contracted and survived smallpox. Though handsome before the disease, Peter's health and appearance were left so ravaged that Empress Elizabeth chose to introduce Peter to his future bride in a room dark enough to obscure his scarring.

Sophia formally converted to Russian Orthodoxy and took the name Ekaterina Alexeievna (i.e., Catherine). They married on 21 August 1745. The marriage was not a happy one but produced one son, the future Emperor Paul I, and one daughter, Anna Petrovna (9 December 1757– 8 March 1759). (Note: Not to be confused with the Grand Duchess of the same name) Catherine later claimed in her private writings that Paul was not fathered by Peter; that, in fact, they had never consummated the marriage. During the sixteen years of their residence in Oranienbaum, Catherine took numerous lovers, while her husband did the same in the beginning.

=== Character ===
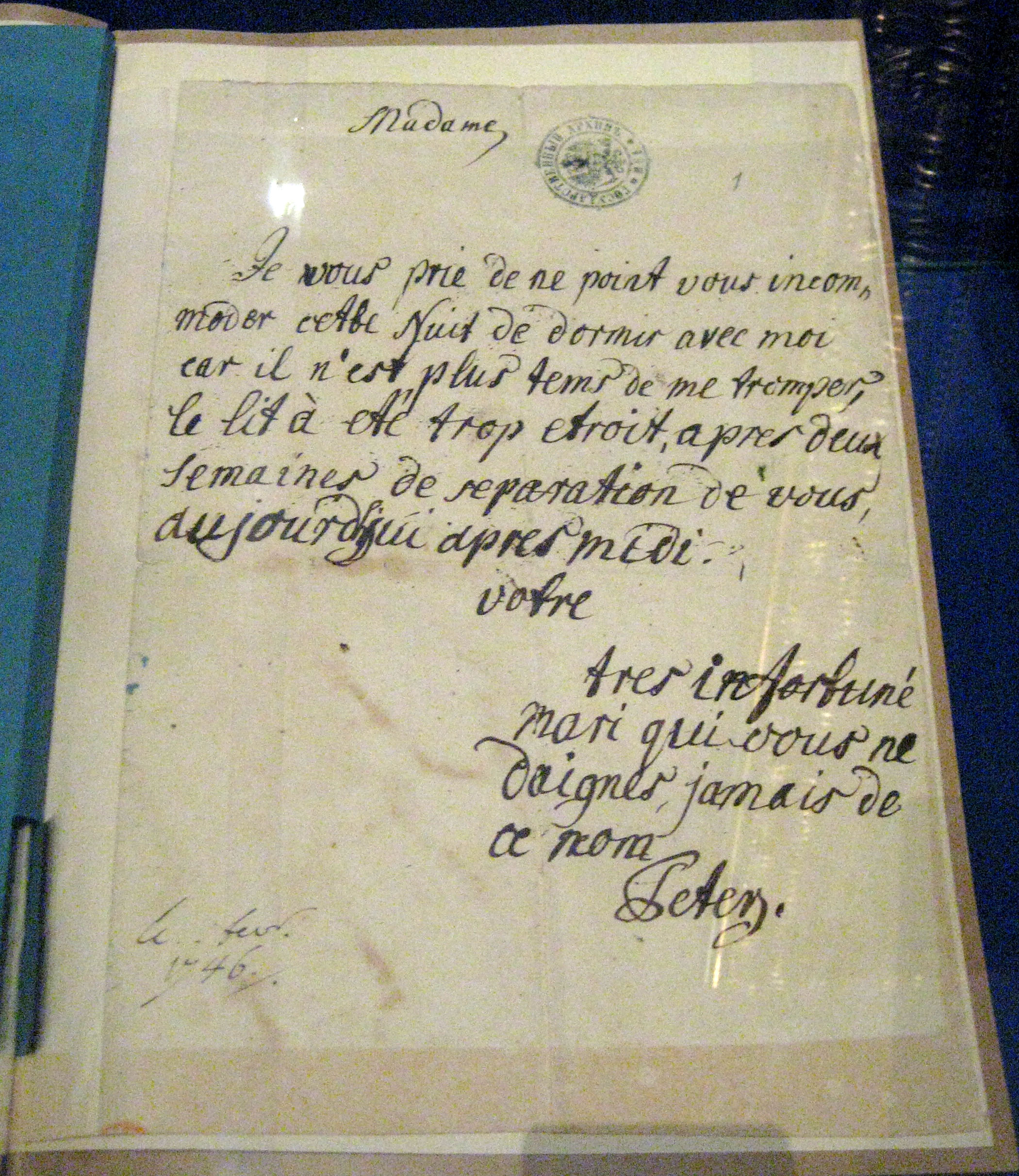
Peter's 1746 letter to his wife in French, the language of the Russian aristocracy

The classical view of Peter's character is mainly drawn out of the memoirs of his wife and successor. She described him as an "idiot" and as a "drunkard from Holstein", also describing her marriage with him with "there is nothing worse than having a child-husband"; even Peter's idol, Frederick the Great mentioned him by saying "he allowed himself to be dethroned like a child sent off to bed".

This portrait of Peter can be found in most history books, including the 1911 Encyclopædia Britannica:

Nature had made him mean, the smallpox had made him hideous, and his degraded habits made him loathsome. And Peter had all the sentiments of the worst kind of a small German prince of the time. He had the conviction that his princeship entitled him to disregard decency and the feelings of others. He planned brutal practical jokes, in which blows had always a share. His most manly taste did not rise above the kind of military interest which has been defined as "corporal's mania," the passion for uniforms, pipeclay, buttons, the "tricks of parade and the froth of discipline." He detested the Russians, and surrounded himself with Holsteiners.

There have been many attempts to revise the traditional characterization of Peter and his policies. The Russian historian A. S. Mylnikov views Peter III very differently:

Many contradictory qualities existed in him: keen observation, zeal and sharp wit in his arguments and actions, incaution and lack of perspicuity in conversation, frankness, goodness, sarcasm, a hot temper, and wrathfulness.

The German historian Elena Palmer goes even further, portraying Peter III as a cultured, open-minded emperor who tried to introduce various courageous, even democratic reforms in 18th-century Russia. A monument for Peter III stands in Kiel, the city of his birth.

== Reign ==
=== Foreign policy ===
Portrait of Peter III by Aleksey Antropov, 1762

After Peter succeeded to the Russian throne (5 January 1762 [O.S. 25 December 1761]), he withdrew Russian forces from the Seven Years' War and concluded a peace treaty (5 May [O.S. 24 April] 1762) with Prussia (dubbed the "Second Miracle of the House of Brandenburg"). He gave up Russian conquests in Prussia and offered 12,000 troops to make an alliance with Frederick II of Prussia (19 June [O.S. 8 June] 1762). Russia thus switched from an enemy of Prussia to an ally—Russian troops withdrew from Berlin and marched against the Austrians. This dramatically shifted the balance of power in Europe, suddenly handing the delighted Frederick the initiative. Frederick recaptured southern Silesia (October 1762) and subsequently forced Austria to the negotiating table.

As Duke of Holstein-Gottorp, Peter planned war against Denmark-Norway in order to restore parts of Schleswig to his Duchy. He focused on making alliances with Sweden and with Great Britain to ensure that they would not interfere on Denmark's behalf, while Russian forces gathered at Kolberg in Russian-occupied Pomerania. Alarmed at the Russian troops concentrating near their borders, unable to find any allies to resist Russian aggression, and short of money to fund a war, the government of Denmark threatened in late June to invade the free city of Hamburg in northern Germany to force a loan from it. Peter considered this a casus belli and prepared for open warfare against Denmark.

In June 1762, 40,000 Russian troops assembled in Pomerania under General Pyotr Rumyantsev, preparing to face 27,000 Danish troops under the French general Count St. Germain in case the Russian–Danish freedom conference (scheduled for 1 July 1762 in Berlin under the patronage of Frederick II) failed to resolve the issue. However, shortly before the conference, Peter lost his throne (9 July [O.S. 28 June] 1762) and the conference did not occur. The issue of Schleswig remained unresolved. Peter was accused of planning an unpatriotic war.

While historically Peter's planned war against Denmark-Norway was seen as a political failure, recent scholarship has portrayed it as part of a pragmatic plan to secure his Holstein-Gottorp duchy and to expand the common Holstein-Russian power northward and westwards. Peter III believed gaining territory and influence in Denmark and Northern Germany was more useful to Russia than taking East Prussia. Equally, he thought that friendship with Prussia and with Britain, following its triumph in the Seven Years War, could offer more to aid his plans than alliance with either Austria or France.

=== Domestic reforms ===
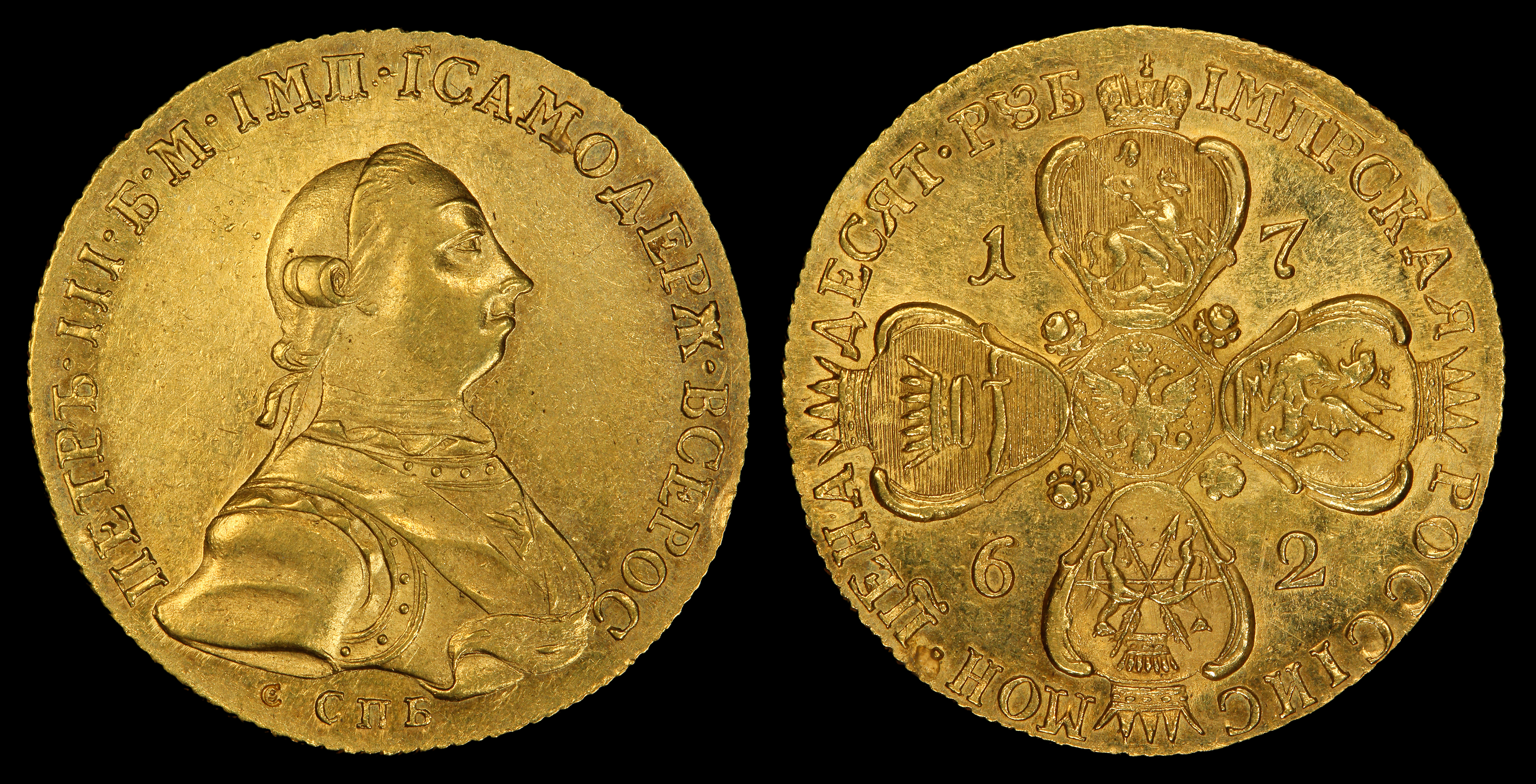
Peter III depicted as emperor on a 10 ruble gold coin (1762)

During his 186-day period of government, Peter III passed 220 new laws that he had developed and elaborated during his life as a crown prince. Writer Elena Palmer claims that his reforms were of a democratic nature and that he also proclaimed religious freedom.

Peter exempted nobles from compulsory civil and military service during peacetime and allowed them to freely travel abroad. He forbade landowners from murdering peasants at the penalty of lifelong exile and ended the persecution of the Old Believers. He also issued a manifesto proclaiming the secularisation of church lands, which he never lived to see realised but which Catherine, a convinced secularist, began implementing during her own reign.

While Catherine continued some of Peter's policies, she also reversed others. For example, Peter abolished the Secret Chancellery, the secret police of the Russian Empire, stating that he objected to the arbitrary arrests and torture it carried out. Catherine soon reestablished it under a different name, the Secret Expedition.

Peter III's economic policy reflected the rising influence of Western capitalism and the merchant class or "Third Estate" that accompanied it. He established the first state bank in Russia, rejected the nobility's monopoly on trade and encouraged mercantilism by increasing grain exports and forbidding the import of sugar and other materials that could be found in Russia.

== Overthrow and death ==
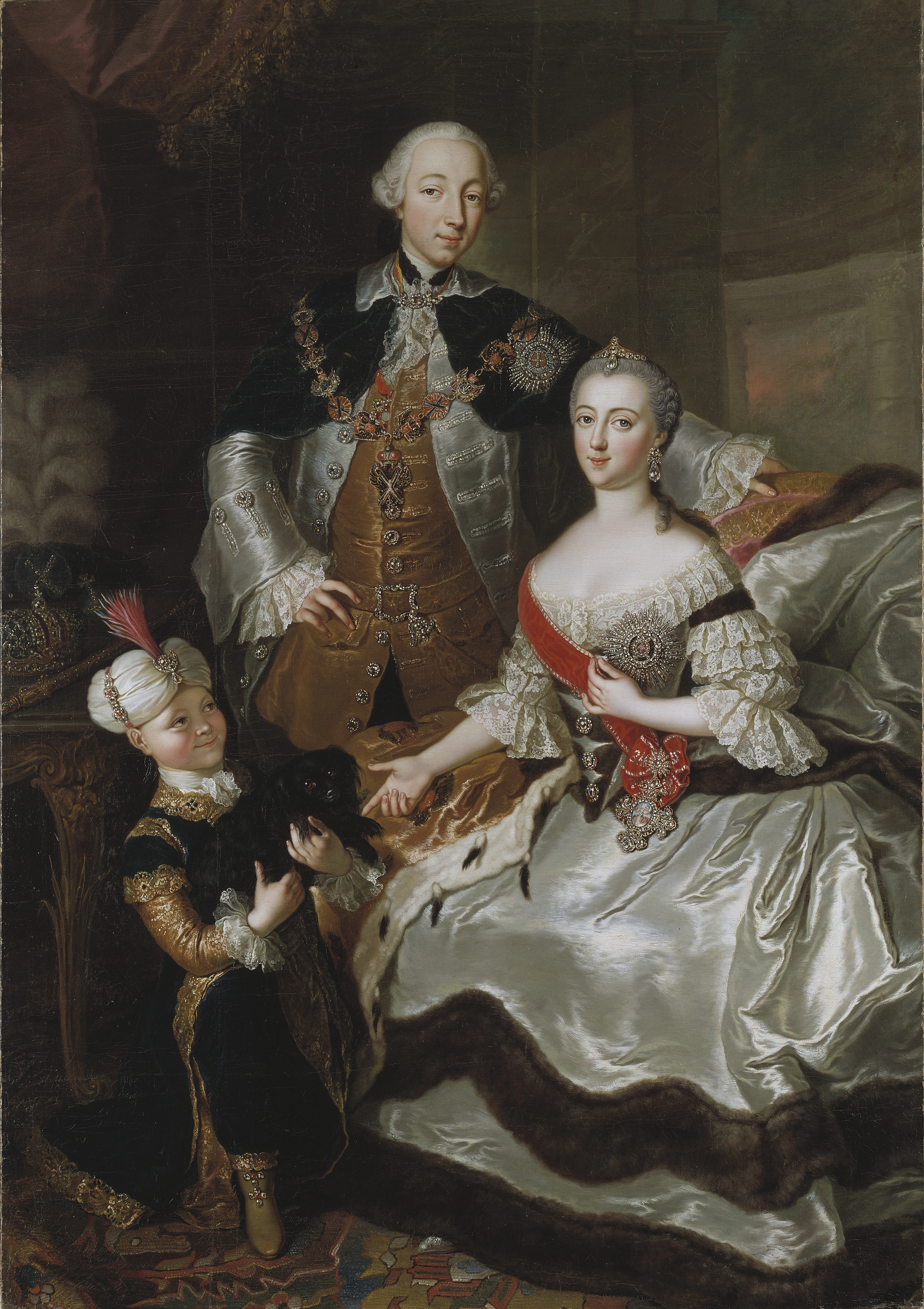
Peter III and Catherine Alexeyevna, 1756

Tsar Peter III was seen as a largely ineffective and unpopular ruler. He was a German-born prince of Prussia, and his loyalty to his native land over his inherited one earned him the ire of his people and his army. Peter had returned Russia's conquered territories back to Prussia and withdrawn his forces from the Seven Years’ War, rendering all of Russia's recent victories, and its sacrifices, pointless.

Many in the Russian army, as well as Russian citizens and Empress Catherine herself, feared that if Peter continued his concessions to Prussia it would lead to a nationwide uprising and threaten the stability of Russia. In the spring of 1762, conspiring with her lover Grigory Orlov and others in the court and military, Catherine began plotting to overthrow her husband.

At dawn on June 28, 1762, Catherine marched with a procession of civilian and military supporters to the Winter Palace, where she was proclaimed heir to the Russian throne by the archbishop of Novgorod. Peter tried to escape by taking a boat to the military base of Kronstadt on Kotlin Island, hoping that the fleet remained loyal to him. However, the fleet's cannons opened fire on Peter's boat with two or three shots, and he was repulsed back to the shore, with the commandant declaring that he was no longer recognized as emperor and that Russia was ruled by Empress Catherine. The people of St. Petersburg, drawn to the shore by the loud echoes of cannons, also armed themselves with sticks and stones to prevent him from returning to the capital city. Twenty four hours later, after learning that the senate, army, and fleet had sworn allegiance to Catherine, with the aid of two guards whom Peter had planned to discipline, he was arrested and forced to abdicate on 9 July [O.S. 28 June] 1762.

Shortly thereafter, he was transported to Ropsha, where he later died. Much mystery surrounds his death. The official cause, after an autopsy, was a severe attack of hemorrhoidal colic and an apoplectic stroke, while others say he was assassinated. Other accounts state that after a midday meal, Peter's captors tried to suffocate him by using a mattress but he managed to escape. This then led his captors to strangle him to death with a scarf. He was buried on 3 August 1762 [O.S. 23 July] in the Alexander Nevsky Monastery, Saint Petersburg.

== Legacy ==
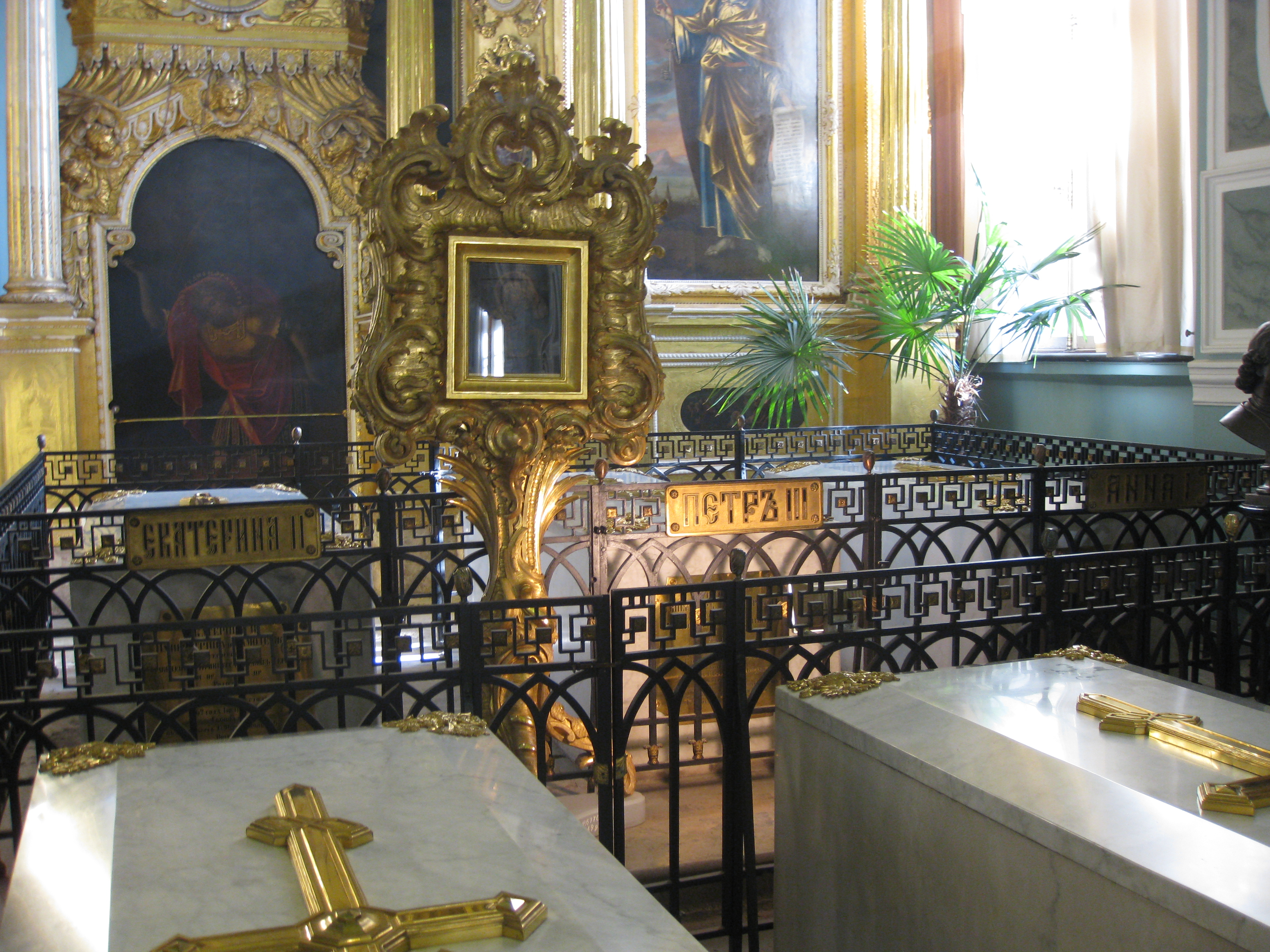
The tombs of Peter III and Catherine II in Saints Peter and Paul Cathedral, Saint Petersburg

After his death, four pretenders to the throne, insisting that they were Peter (five if Šćepan Mali of Montenegro is included) came forth, supported by revolts among the people, who believed in a rumor that Peter had not died but had been secretly imprisoned by Catherine. The most famous was the Cossack Yemelyan Pugachev, who led what came to be known as Pugachev's Rebellion in 1774, which was ultimately crushed by Catherine's forces. In addition, Kondratii Selivanov, who led a castrating sect known as the Skoptsy, claimed to be both Jesus and Peter III.

In December 1796, after succeeding Catherine, Peter's son, Emperor Paul I, who disliked his mother's behavior, arranged for Peter's remains to be exhumed and reburied with full honors in the Peter and Paul Cathedral, where other tsars (Russian emperors) were buried.

=== Lore ===
The legend of Peter is still talked about, especially in the town where he lived most of his life, formerly Oranienbaum, later Lomonosov, situated on the southern coast of the Gulf of Finland, 40 km west of St. Petersburg. Peter's palace is the only one of the famous palaces in the St. Petersburg area that was not captured by the Germans during the Second World War. During the war, the building was a school and people say the ghost of Peter protected the children of Oranienbaum from getting hurt by bombs. Furthermore, it was near this town that the siege of Leningrad ended in January 1944. People say that Peter, after his death, stopped Hitler's army near Leningrad, just as the living Peter had ordered the Russian army to stop, just as it was about to capture Konigsberg.

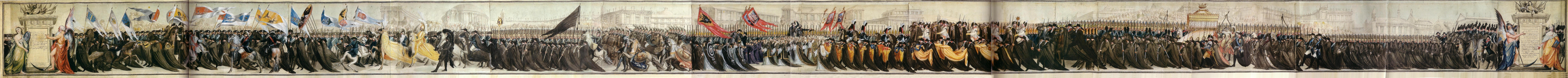
Second burial of Peter III, c. 1796

In 2014 the German government, influenced by a broad public movement sparked by Elena Palmer's book 'Der Prinz von Holstein', erected a monument to Peter III in his birthplace — the first monument in the world dedicated to him. Thus, after 250 years, the emperor received his official public rehabilitation.

== Cultural references ==
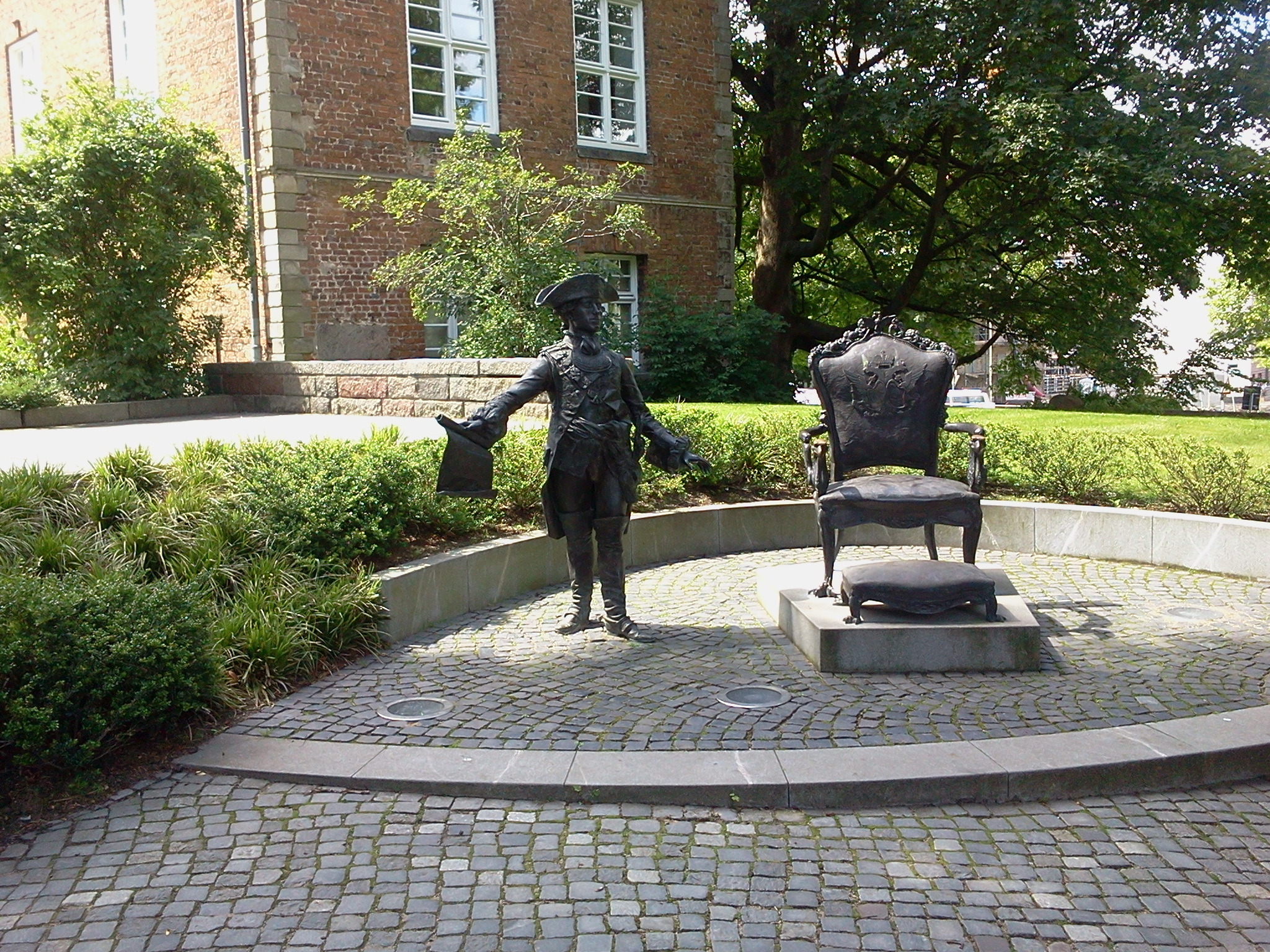
Monument of Peter III in Kiel

Peter has been depicted on screen a number of times, almost always in films concerning his wife Catherine. He was portrayed by Rudolf Klein-Rogge in the 1927 film The Loves of Casanova, Douglas Fairbanks Jr. in the 1934 film The Rise of Catherine the Great and by Sam Jaffe in The Scarlet Empress the same year. In 1991 Reece Dinsdale portrayed him in the television series Young Catherine. La Tempesta (1958) depicts Yemelyan Pugachev's effort to force his recognition as Peter III and offers a critical view of Catherine the Great, with Van Heflin in the role of Pugachev and Viveca Lindfors as Catherine. He was also depicted as a cowardly, drunken wife-beater in the Japanese anime Le Chevalier D'Eon. He also appears in the 2014 TV series played by Aleksandr Yatsenko. A historically inaccurate version of him was played by Nicholas Hoult in the 2020–2023 Hulu dramedy series The Great, also starring Elle Fanning as Catherine.

== See also ==
- Family tree of Russian monarchs
- List of unsolved deaths

== Bibliography ==
- Bain, Robert Nisbet (1902). Peter III, Emperor of Russia : The Story of a Crisis and a Crime. New York City: E.P. Dutton & Co.
- Dull, Jonathon R. The French Navy and the Seven Years War. University of Nebraska, 2005.
- Leonard, Carol S. "The Reputation of Peter III." Russian Review 47.3 (1988): 263–292 online.
- Leonard, Carol S. (1993). Reform and regicide : The reign of Peter III of Russia. Bloomington: Indiana University Press. ISBN 0253333229.
- Mylnikov, Alexander S. (1994). Die falschen Zaren : Peter III. und seine Doppelgänger in Russland und Osteuropa [The False Tsars: Peter III and his Doppelgangers in Russia and Eastern Europe]. Eutiner Forschungen; 3 (in German). Translated by Valeria Andrejewa; Susanne Luber. Eutin: Struve's Buchdruckerei und Verlag. ISBN 3923457286.
- Mylnikov, Alexander S. (2002). Петр III : Повествование в документах и версиях [Piotr III : A narrative in documents and versions] (in Russian) (1st ed.). Moscow: Molodaya Gvardiya. ISBN 978-5-235-03244-6.
- Palmer, Elena (2005). Peter III. : Der Prinz von Holstein [Peter III : The Prince of Holstein] (in German). Sutton Verlag. ISBN 3-89702-788-7.
- Pares, Bernard. A History of Russia (1944) pp 240–244. online.
- Raleigh, Donald J.; Iskenderov, A.A., eds. (1996). The Emperors and Empresses of Russia : Reconsidering the Romanovs. Armonk, New York: M. E. Sharpe. ISBN 9781563247606.
- Valishevsky, Kazimir (1893). Catherine the Great. Novel of an Empress. Russia. ISBN 5-85202-003-6. "Kazimir Russian wiki page: Ru:Валишевский, Казимир"
- Erickson, Carolly (1994). Great Catherine: The Life of Catherine the Great, Empress of Russia. St. Martin's Press. ISBN 0312135033. "The American Spectator, book review by Florence King"
- Palmer, Elena Peter III. Rebirth. Sutton Verlag, 2007.

Peter III of Russia House of Holstein-Gottorp-Romanov Cadet branch of the House of Oldenburg Born: 21 February 1728 Died: 17 July 1762
Regnal titles
Preceded by Elizabeth	Emperor of Russia; 1762	Succeeded by Catherine II
Preceded by Charles Frederick	Duke of Schleswig-Holstein-Gottorp; 1739–1762	Succeeded by Paul I
Preceded by Charles Frederick; Christian VI	Duke of Holstein; 1739–1762 with Christian VI (1739–1746); Frederick V (1746–1762)	Succeeded by Paul; Frederick V
