= Treaty of Frederiksborg =

1720 peace treaty ending the Great Northern War

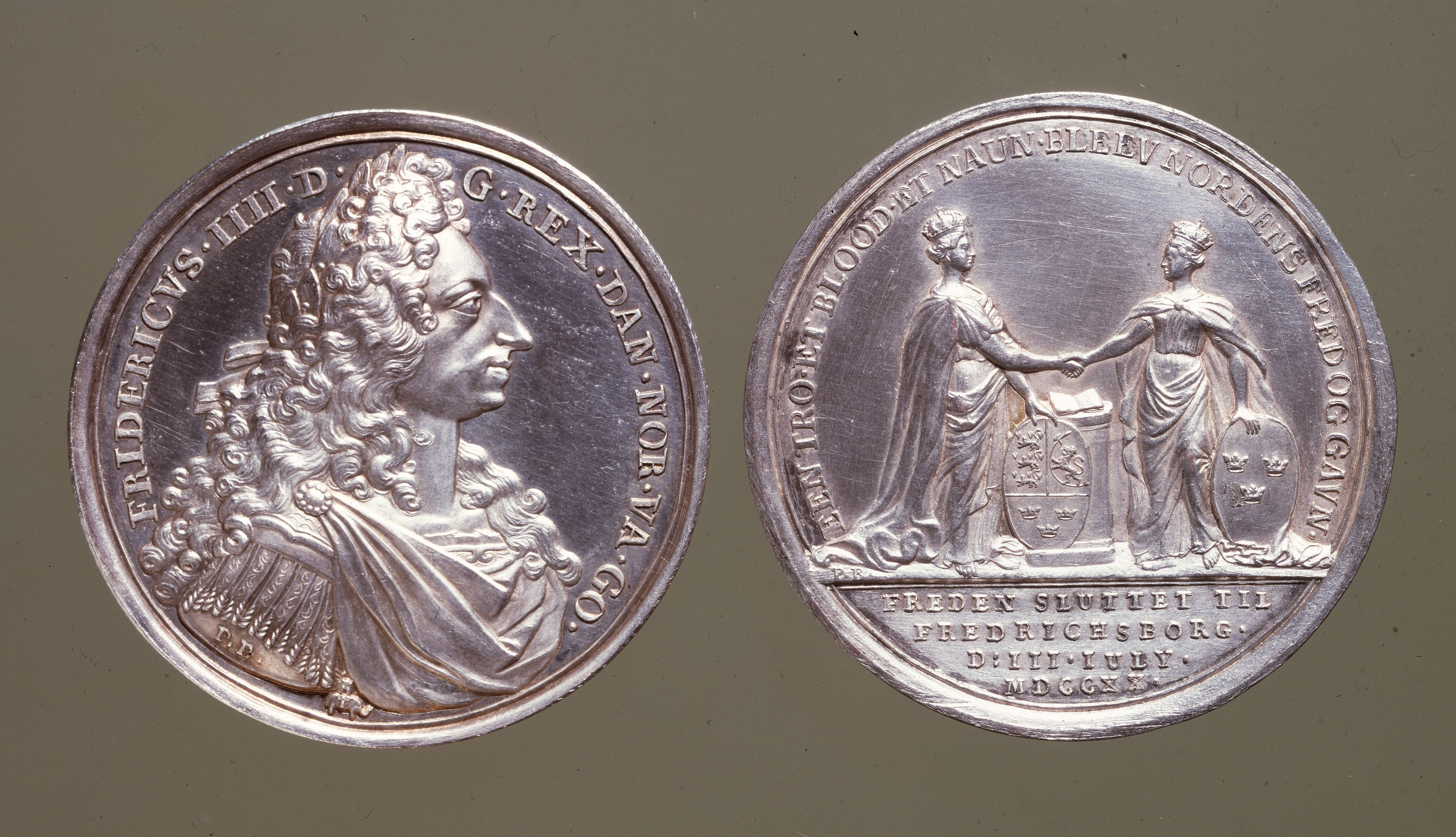
A Danish medal commemorating the Treaty of Frederiksborg.

The Treaty of Frederiksborg (Danish: Frederiksborgfreden) was a treaty signed at Frederiksborg Castle, Zealand, on 3 July 1720 (14 July 1720 according to the Gregorian calendar), ending the Great Northern War between Denmark–Norway and Sweden.

== History ==
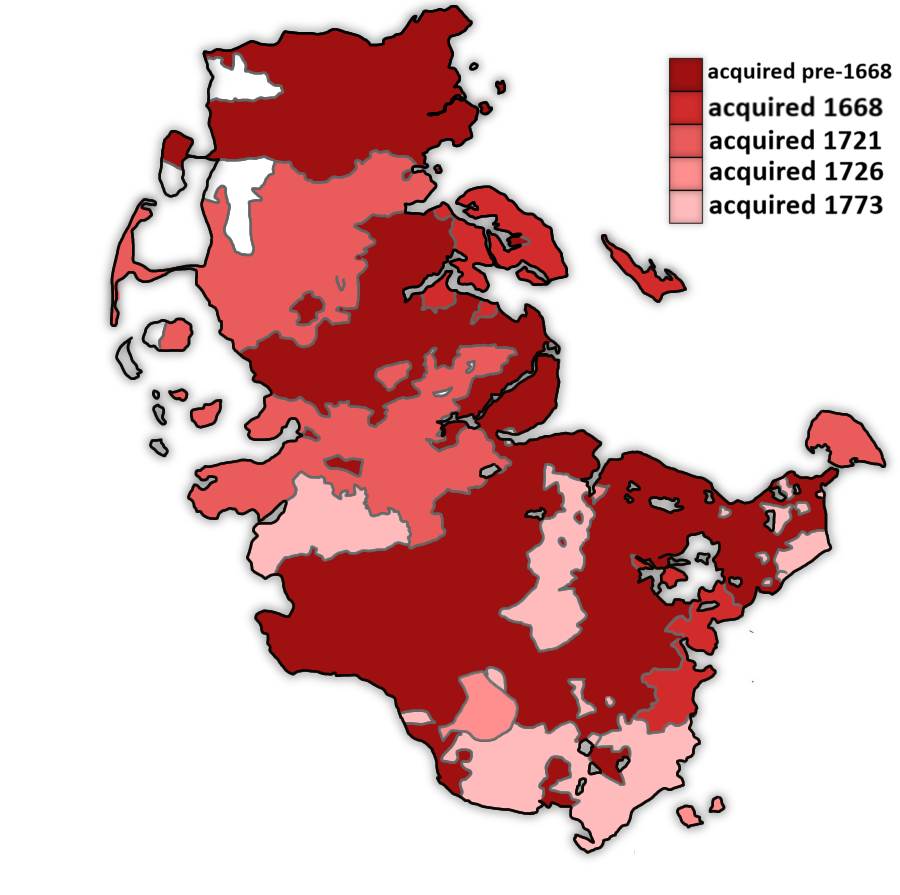
Unification process of Holstein

The Danish-Swedish conflict began with a Danish attack in 1700 but Sweden forced a peace the same year, while continuing to fight Russia. Denmark rejoined the war in 1709 in a campaign to regain their lost provinces; Scania, Blekinge, and Halland. Denmark participated until the Swedish defeat, primarily at the hands of Russia, in 1721.

Sweden paid 600,000 Riksdaler in damages, broke her alliance with Holstein and forfeited her right to duty-free passage of Öresund. Denmark also gained full control over Schleswig, while Danish-held areas of Swedish Pomerania were returned to Sweden.

== Bibliography ==
- Heitz, Gerhard; Rischer, Henning (1995). Geschichte in Daten. Mecklenburg-Vorpommern (in German). Münster-Berlin: Koehler&Amelang. ISBN 3-7338-0195-4.
