= John Frederick of Holstein-Gottorp =

- Prince-Bishop of Lübeck; Prince-Archbishop of Bremen; Prince-Bishop of Verden
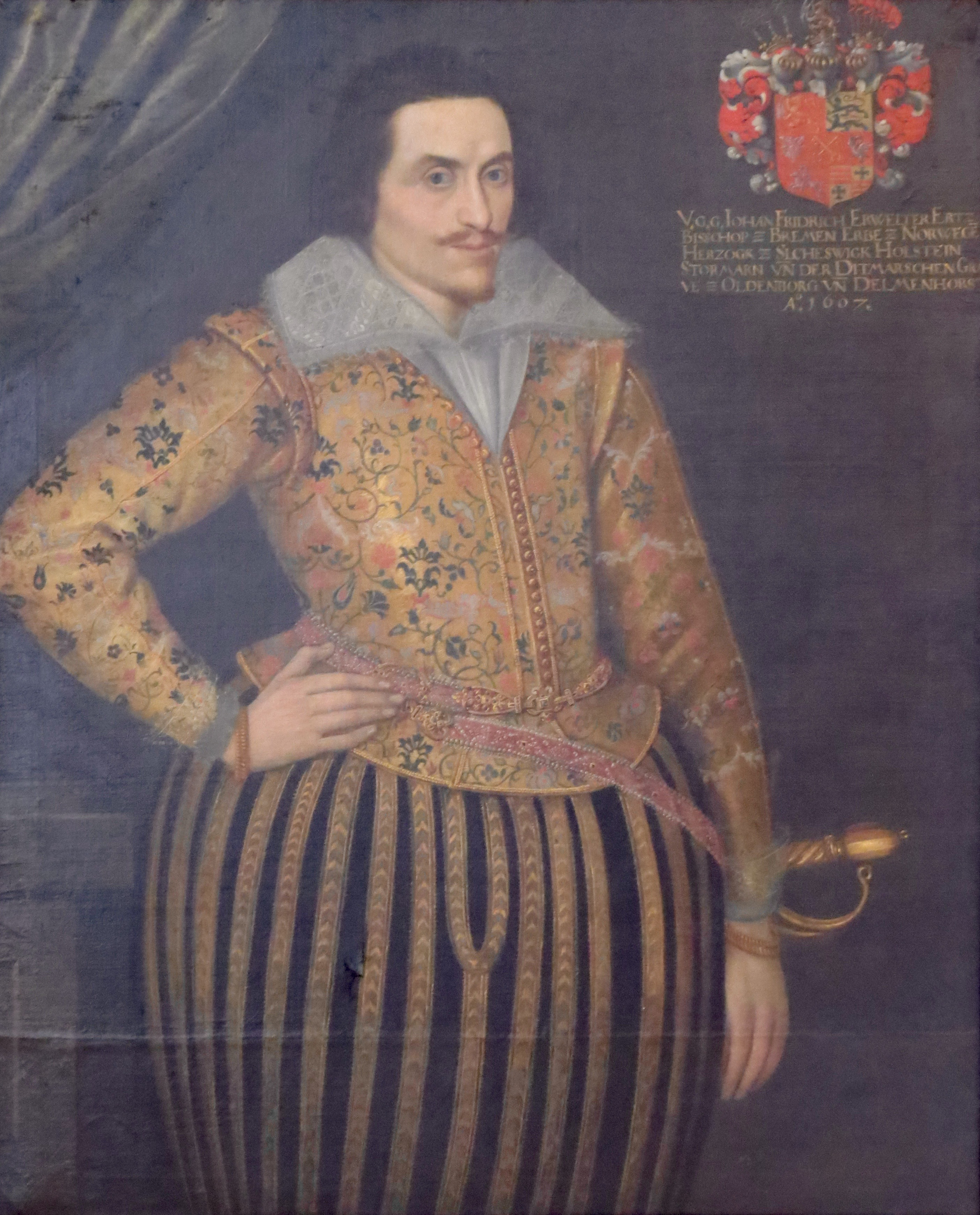
- Born: 1 September 1579; Gottorp
- Died: 3 September 1634 (aged 55); Altkloster
- Noble family: Holstein-Gottorp
- Issue: Friedrich von Holstein; Christine von Holstein
- Father: Adolf, Duke of Holstein-Gottorp
- Mother: Christine of Hesse

John Frederick of Schleswig-Holstein-Gottorp (born 1 September 1579 in Gottorp, a part of today's Schleswig; died 3 September 1634 in Altkloster, a part of today's Buxtehude) was the Lutheran Administrator of the Prince-Archbishopric of Bremen, the Prince-Bishopric of Lübeck and the Prince-Bishopric of Verden.

== Life ==
His parents were Adolf I, Duke of Schleswig-Holstein-Gottorp and Christine, Landgravine of Hesse-Cassel. John Frederick and Anna Dobbel from Bremervörde, the Bremian prince-archiepiscopal residence, had two children: Friedrich and Christine. In 1621 Ferdinand II, Holy Roman Emperor, legitimated them and ennobled them as von Holstein.

After John Frederick's brother John Adolf succeeded their brother Philip, Duke of Schleswig-Holstein-Gottorp as Duke of Schleswig-Holstein-Gottorp, the Bremian Chapter feared that John Adolf would integrate the Prince-Archbishopric of Bremen into his inheritable ducal monarchy. The Chapter demanded that John Adolf would resign, which he did in 1596 in favour of John Frederick. In 1607 John Adolf also handed over the Prince-Bishopric of Lübeck to his brother.

At the beginning of the Thirty Years' War, John Frederick and his prince-bishoprics of Bremen and Lübeck maintained neutrality, as did most of the territories in the Lower Saxon Circle.

After 1613 King Christian IV of Denmark and Norway, being in personal union Duke of Holstein within the Holy Roman Empire, turned his attention to gain grounds by acquiring the prince-bishoprics of Bremen, Verden, Minden and Halberstadt.

He skillfully took advantage of the alarm of the German Protestants after the Battle of White Mountain in 1620, to stipulate with Bremen's Chapter and John Frederick, his cousin of second degree, to grant coadjutorship of the See of Bremen for his son Frederick, later Crown Prince of Denmark (September 1621). Coadjutorship usually included the succession of a See.

In November 1619 Christian IV of Denmark, Duke of Holstein stationed Danish troops in the Bremian city of Stade, officially on behalf of his son the provided to be Administrator successor, suppressing an unrest of its burghers.

In 1620 Christian, the Younger, titular Duke of Brunswick and Lunenburg-Wolfenbüttel, the Lutheran Administrator of the Prince-Bishopric Halberstadt requested that the Lutheran Prince-Archbishopric of Bremen would join the war coalition of the Protestant Union. John Frederick and the Bremian Estates met in a diet and declared their loyalty to Ferdinand II, Holy Roman Emperor, as well as their neutrality in the conflict.

With Danish troops within his territory, John Frederick tried desperately to keep his Prince-Archbishopric out of the war, being in complete agreement with the Estates and the city of Bremen. When in 1623 the Republic of the Seven United Netherlands, fighting in the Eighty Years' War for its independence against Habsburg's Spanish and imperial forces, requested its Calvinist co-religionist of the city of Bremen to join, the city refused, but started to enforce its fortifications.

In 1623 the territories comprising the Lower Saxon Circle decided to recruit an army in order to maintain an armed neutrality, with troops of the Catholic League already operating in the neighboured Lower Rhenish-Westphalian Circle and dangerously approaching their region. The concomitant effects of the war, debasements and dearness, had already caused an inflation also in the region. The population suffered from billeting and alimenting Baden-Durlachian, Danish, Halberstadtian, Leaguist, and Palatine troops, whose marching through the John Frederick had to tolerate in order to prevent entering into armed conflict.

In 1623 the Republic of the Seven United Netherlands, diplomatically supported by James I, King of England, the brother-in-law of Christian IV of Denmark, started a new anti-Habsburg campaign. Thus the troops of the Catholic League were bound and the Prince-Archbishopric seemed relieved. But soon after the imperial troops under Albrecht von Wallenstein headed for the North in an attempt to destroy the fading Hanseatic League, in order to subject the Hanseatic cities of Bremen, Hamburg and Lübeck and to establish a Baltic trade monopoly, to be run by some imperial favourites including Spaniards and Poles. The idea was to win Sweden's and Denmark's support, both of which since long were after the destruction of the Hanseatic League.

In May 1625 Christian IV of Denmark, Duke of Holstein was elected – in the latter of his functions – by the Lower Saxon Circle's member territories commander-in-chief of the Lower Saxon troops. More troops were recruited and to be billeted and alimented in the Lower Saxon territories, including the Prince-Archbishopric. In the same year Christian IV joined the Anglo-Dutch war coalition. In 1625 Johan 't Serclaes, Count of Tilly warned John Frederick to further accept the stationing of Danish troops and Ferdinand II, Holy Roman Emperor, demanded the immediate end of his and Verden's alliance with Denmark. Verden was already ruled by Christian's son Frederick II, Administrator of the Prince-Bishopric of Verden, being as well the intended successor of John Frederick. He declared again his loyalty to the Emperor and neutrality in the conflict.

In response, Christian IV ordered his troops to capture all the important traffic hubs in the Prince-Archbishopric and entered into the Battle of Lutter am Barenberge, on 27 August 1626, where he was defeated by the Leaguist troops under Tilly. Christian IV and his surviving troops fled to the Prince-Archbishopric of Bremen and took their headquarters in Stade. John Frederick fled to his Prince-Bishopric of Lübeck and left the rule in the Prince-Archbishopric of Bremen to the Chapter and the Estates.

By 1627, Christian IV had de facto dismissed John Frederick from the Bremian See. In the same year, Christian IV withdrew from the Prince-Archbishopric of Bremen, in order to fight Wallenstein's invasion of Duchy of Holstein. Tilly then invaded the Prince-Archbishopric and captured its southern parts. The city of Bremen shut its city gates and entrenched behind its improved fortifications. In 1628, Tilly besieged Stade with its remaining garrison of 3,500 Danish and English soldiers. On 5 May 1628 Tilly granted them safe-conduct to England and Denmark and the whole Prince-Archbishopric was in his hands. Now Tilly turned to the city of Bremen, which paid him a ransom of 10,000 rixdollars in order to spare its siege. The city remained unoccupied.

Wallenstein had meanwhile conquered all the Jutish Peninsula, which made Christian IV to sign the Treaty of Lübeck, on 22 May 1629, in order to regain possession of all his feoffs on the peninsula, he in return agreed to formally end Denmark's participation in the Thirty Years' War and waived for his son Frederick II, Administrator of the Prince-Bishopric of Verden, the administration of that prince-bishopric as well as the provided succession as Administrator of the Prince-Bishopric of Halberstadt.

John Frederick, exiled in the Imperial Free City of Lübeck, was in a markedly weak position. So in 1628 he consented that the Lutheran convent in the former Premonstratensian Our Lady's Friary in Stade – under Leaguist occupation – was restituted to Catholic rite and manned with foreign monks, if the Chapter would also agree. Again passing the buck on to the Chapter.

The Leaguist takeover enabled Ferdinand II, Holy Roman Emperor, to implement the Edict of Restitution, decreed on 6 March 1629 within the Prince-Archbishopric of Bremen. The Bremian monasteries still maintaining Roman Catholic rite – Altkloster, Harsefeld Archabbey, Neukloster, and Zeven Nunnery – became the local strongholds for a reCatholicisation within the scope of Counter-Reformation.

Under the threat of the Edict of Restitution John Frederick consented to Canonical Visitations of the remaining monasteries, those clinging to Roman Catholic rite and those converted to voluntary Lutheran convents alike. Nunneries had traditionally been institutions to provide unmarried daughters of the better off, who couldn't be provided a husband befitting their social status or who didn't want to marry, with a decent livelihood. So when an unmarried woman of that status joined a nunnery she would bestow earning assets (real estate) or – restricted to her lifetime – regular revenues paid by her male relatives, on the nunnery, making up in the former case part of the nunnery's estates (not to be confused with the political body of the Estates).

In many territories, where the majority of the population adopted Lutheranism, the nunneries' function to provide sustenance for unmarried women wasn't to be given up. So it happened that the Prince-Archbishopric's former Roman Catholic nunneries of Himmelpforten, Lilienthal St. Mary's Nunnery in the Valley of Lilies, Neuenwalde, and Osterholz with all their estates had turned into such foundations (German: das Stift, more particular: Damenstift, literally "Ladies' foundation"), while the nunnery of Zeven was in the process of becoming one, with – among a majority of Catholic nuns – a number of nuns of Lutheran denomination, usually called conventuals. Other expressions like abbess, for the chairwoman, and prioress for conventuals of certain hierarchic function, were – and are partly – continued to be used in such Lutheran Stifte.

Within the scope of the visitations by the end of the year 1629 the Roman Catholic visitors issued an ultimatum to the Lutheran conventuals to convert to Catholicism or to leave the convents. No conversion had been recorded, so at different dates between before Christmas 1629 and April 1631 all Lutheran conventuals had been thrown out from the nunneries, with the estates of Himmelpforten and Neuenwalde then being bestowed to the Jesuits, in order to finance them and their missioning in the course of the Counter-Reformation in the Prince-Archbishopric. The expelled conventuals were denied to get the real estate restituted, which they bestowed on the nunnery, when they entered it.

Ferdinand II suspended the capitulars from penalty, if they would dismiss the Lutheran coadjutor Frederick, later Crown Prince of Denmark from office. The Chapter refused, still backing Frederick, whom it had elected with full legal validity in 1621. So Ferdinand II himself dismissed him by way of using the Edict of Restitution, in favour of his youngest son, the Roman Catholic Leopold Wilhelm, Archduke of Austria, already prince-bishop of Halberstadt (1628-1648), Passau (1625-1662) and Strasbourg (1626-1662).

Ferdinand II left John Frederick in office, against Leaguist resistance, for he had always kept loyalty to him. The Catholic League wished the Roman Catholic Franz Wilhelm, Count of Wartenberg, prince-bishopric of Osnabrück (1625–1661), onto the See. After all, the See included at those years an annual revenue of 60,000 rixdollars at the free disposal of its holder, making up half the Prince-Archbishopric's budget.

Franz Wilhelm, Count of Wartenberg, appointed by Ferdinand II as chairman of the imperial restitution commission, carrying out the provisions of the Edict of Restitution in the Lower Saxon Circle, dismissed John Frederick in 1629, who acquiesced.

In February 1631 John Frederick conferred with Gustavus II Adolphus of Sweden and a number of Lower Saxon princes in Leipzig, all of them troubled by the Habsburg's growing influence wielded by virtue of the Edict of Restitution in a number of Northern German Lutheran prince-bishoprics. John Frederick speculated to regain the Prince-Archbishopric of Bremen and therefore in June/July 1631 officially allied himself with Sweden. For the war being John Frederick accepted the supreme command of Gustavus II Adolphus, who promised to restitute the Prince-Archbishopric to its former Administrator. In October an Army, newly recruited by John Frederick, started to reconquer the Prince-Archbishopric and – supported by Swedish troops – to capture the neighboured Prince-Bishopric of Verden, de facto dismissing Verden's Catholic Prince-Bishop Franz Wilhelm, Count of Wartenberg, (ruled 1630–1632) and causing the flight of the Catholic clergy wherever they arrived. The Prince-Bishopric of Verden became subject of a Swedish military administration with John Frederick being officially the Administrator.

The reconquest of the Prince-Archbishopric of Bremen – helped by forces from Sweden and from the city of Bremen – was interrupted by Leaguist forces under Gottfried Heinrich Graf zu Pappenheim, coming as a relief to Stade, where they joined the Catholic imperial and Leaguist forces still holding out. On 18 May 1632 they were granted safe-conduct and left a desperately impoverished city of Stade after its siege by John Frederick's forces. John Frederick was back in his office, only to realise the supremacy of Sweden, insisting on its supreme command until the war's end.

The Prince-Archbishopric of Bremen continuously suffered from billeting and alimenting soldiers. The relation between the Estates, who had to maintain administration under Catholic occupation, and the returned John Frederick were difficult. The Estates preferred to directly negotiate with the occupants, this time the Swedes. John Frederick wanted to secularise the monasteries in favour of his budget, but the opposing Estates prevented that.

After John Frederick's death in 1634 the Bremian Chapter and Estates regarded Frederick's (later Danish Crown Prince) dismissal as coadjutor by Ferdinand II by virtue of the Edict of Restitution illegitimate. But the Swedish occupants had to be persuaded first, to accept Frederick's succession. So Chapter and Estates ruled the Prince-Archbishopric until the conclusion of the negotiations with Sweden. In 1635 he succeeded as Lutheran Administrator Frederick II in the Sees of Bremen and of Verden. But he had to render homage to the minor Queen regnant Christina of Sweden.

In the same year, Pope Urban VIII provided the Catholic coadjutor Leopold Wilhelm, Archduke of Austria with the Archdiocese of Bremen, but due to its persisting occupation by the Swedes he never gained de facto pastoral influence let alone power as Prince-Archbishop.

== Ancestors ==
Ancestors of John Frederick of Holstein-Gottorp

16. Dietrich, Count of Oldenburg
8. Christian I of Denmark
17. Hedvig of Holstein
4. Frederick I of Denmark
18. John, Margrave of Brandenburg-Kulmbach
9. Dorothea of Brandenburg
19. Barbara of Saxe-Wittenberg
2. Adolf, Duke of Holstein-Gottorp
20. Eric II, Duke of Pomerania
10. Bogislaw X, Duke of Pomerania
21. Sophia of Pomerania-Stolp
5. Sophie of Pomerania
22. Casimir IV Jagiellon
11. Anna Jagiellon
23. Elizabeth of Austria
1. John Frederick of Holstein-Gottorp, Prince-Bishop
24. Louis II, Landgrave of Lower Hesse
12. William II, Landgrave of Hesse
25. Mechthild of Württemberg-Urach
6. Philip I, Landgrave of Hesse
26. Magnus II, Duke of Mecklenburg
13. Anna of Mecklenburg-Schwerin
27. Sophie of Pomerania-Stettin
3. Christine of Hesse
28. Albert III, Duke of Saxony
14. George, Duke of Saxony
29. Sidonie Podiebrad
7. Christine of Saxony
30. Casimir IV Jagiellon (= 22)
15. Barbara Jagiellon
31. Elizabeth of Austria (= 23)

== Notes ==
John Frederick of Holstein-Gottorp House of Schleswig-Holstein-Gottorp Cadet branch of the House of Oldenburg Born: 1 September 1579 in Gottorp Died: 3 September 1634 in Altkloster
Regnal titles
Religious titles
Preceded by John Adolphus, Duke of Schleswig-Holstein-Gottorp (Lutheran Administrator)	Prince-Bishop of Lübeck; 1607–1634 (Lutheran Administrator)	Succeeded by John X (Lutheran Administrator)
Preceded by John Adolphus, Duke of Schleswig-Holstein-Gottorp (Lutheran Administrator)	Prince-Archbishop of Bremen; 1596–1634 (Lutheran Administrator)	Vacant Title next held by Frederick III of Denmark (Lutheran Administrator); 1634-1635 rule by Chapter and Estates
Preceded by Francis of Wartenberg	Prince-Bishop of Verden; 1631–1634 (Lutheran Administrator)	Vacant Title next held by Frederick III of Denmark (Lutheran Administrator); 1634-1635 rule by Chapter and Estates
