= Schleswig Cathedral =

Cathedral in Schleswig city, Germany

- Cathedral of St. Peter at Schleswig
- Schleswiger Dom
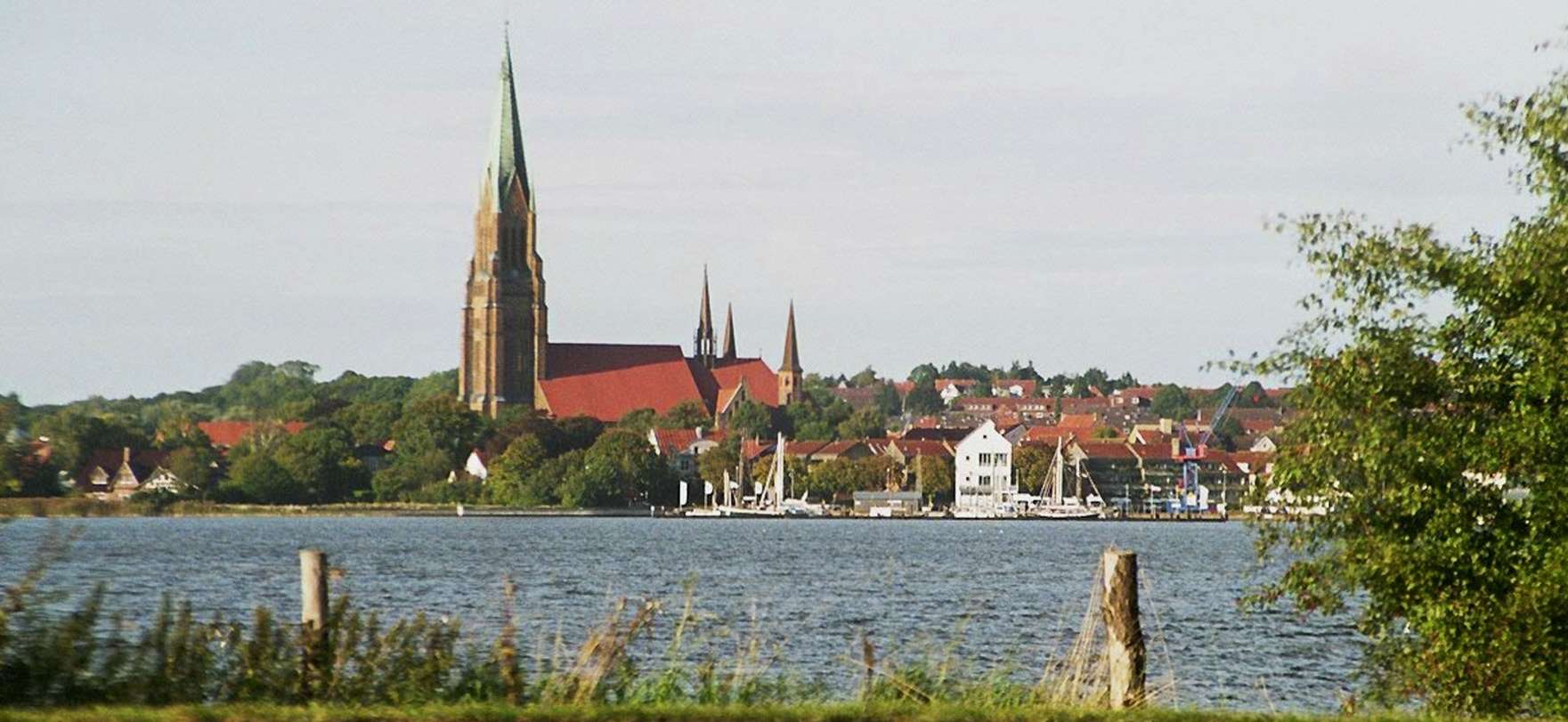
- Schleswig Cathedral
- 54°30′48″N 9°34′09″E
- Location: Schleswig
- Denomination: Lutheran
- Previous denomination: Roman Catholic

Architecture
- Style: Gothic

Schleswig Cathedral (German: Schleswiger Dom, Danish: Slesvig Domkirke) officially the Cathedral of St. Peter at Schleswig (German: St. Petri-Dom zu Schleswig), is the main church of the city of Schleswig and was the cathedral of the Bishop of Schleswig until the diocese was dissolved in 1624. It is now a church of the North Elbian Evangelical Lutheran Church, the seat of the Lutheran Bishop of Schleswig and Holstein, and ranks among the most important architectural monuments of Schleswig-Holstein.

== History ==
=== Predecessors ===
In 850 a missionary church was founded in Haithabu (Hedeby). Between 947 and 949 Otto I installed three dioceses on the Cimbrian peninsula: Ribe, Schleswig and in 948 Århus. After the foundation of the Schleswig diocese in 947, the first cathedral in Schleswig was built. Today, neither the size nor the location of this cathedral is known.

=== Construction ===
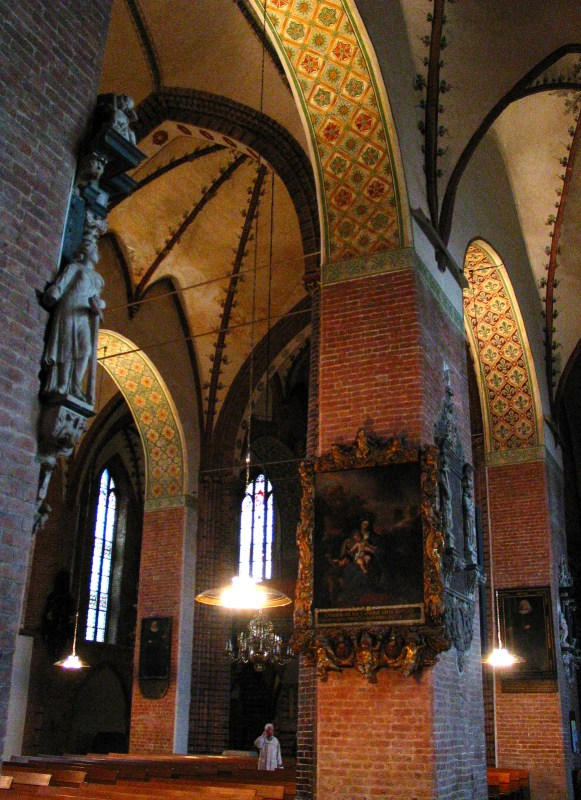
Gothic inside of Schleswig Cathedral

In 1134, construction of a new romanesque basilica began. The work was only completed around 1200, because an additional nave was constructed that can still be seen today. Construction materials included granite, tuff from the Rhine, and brick.

In 1134, the Danish King Niels’ headless body was laid out in St. Peter's Cathedral after it was pulled from the Schlei in the nets of local fishermen. The monks who attended the corpse heard strange noises and thought that the spirit of King Niels was wandering about in the church. As a result, the king's body was taken to Gottorp and stuffed into a boggy grave. Someone hammered a stake through Niels' chest to keep him there. Legend has it that King Niels' still haunts the cathedral, and that he still hunts across the moors and forest of Schleswig with his hounds. King Frederick I of Denmark is entombed in the cathedral.

After the collapse of two towers and some parts of the basilica in 1275, the High Gothic Hall Choir was constructed and completed around 1300.

The Late Gothic Hall Church was built from 1200 to 1408 and was finally completed in the 16th century. In 1894 that the cathedral got its final outward appearance. In 1879 Schleswig became the provincial capital in 1879, and in 1888 the construction of a Gothic Revival western tower began at the request of the King William II of Prussia. It was completed in 1894 and at 112 metres, a little too high compared to the proportions of the cathedral. There is a viewing platform on the tower at 65 metres which commands a great view on the city of Schleswig, the Schlei and the fishing village of Holm. As of 2006, one can view the bells above the platform with a special guided tour starting in the cathedral.

Beside the Gothic Altar of the Magi (c. 1300) in the southern choir, a bronze baptismal font in the high choir by Ghert Klinghe (1480) and a four-metre-high wood carving of Christophorus, the cathedral's main attraction is the famous Bordesholm Altar.

== The cathedral in detail ==
=== The Petri Portal ===
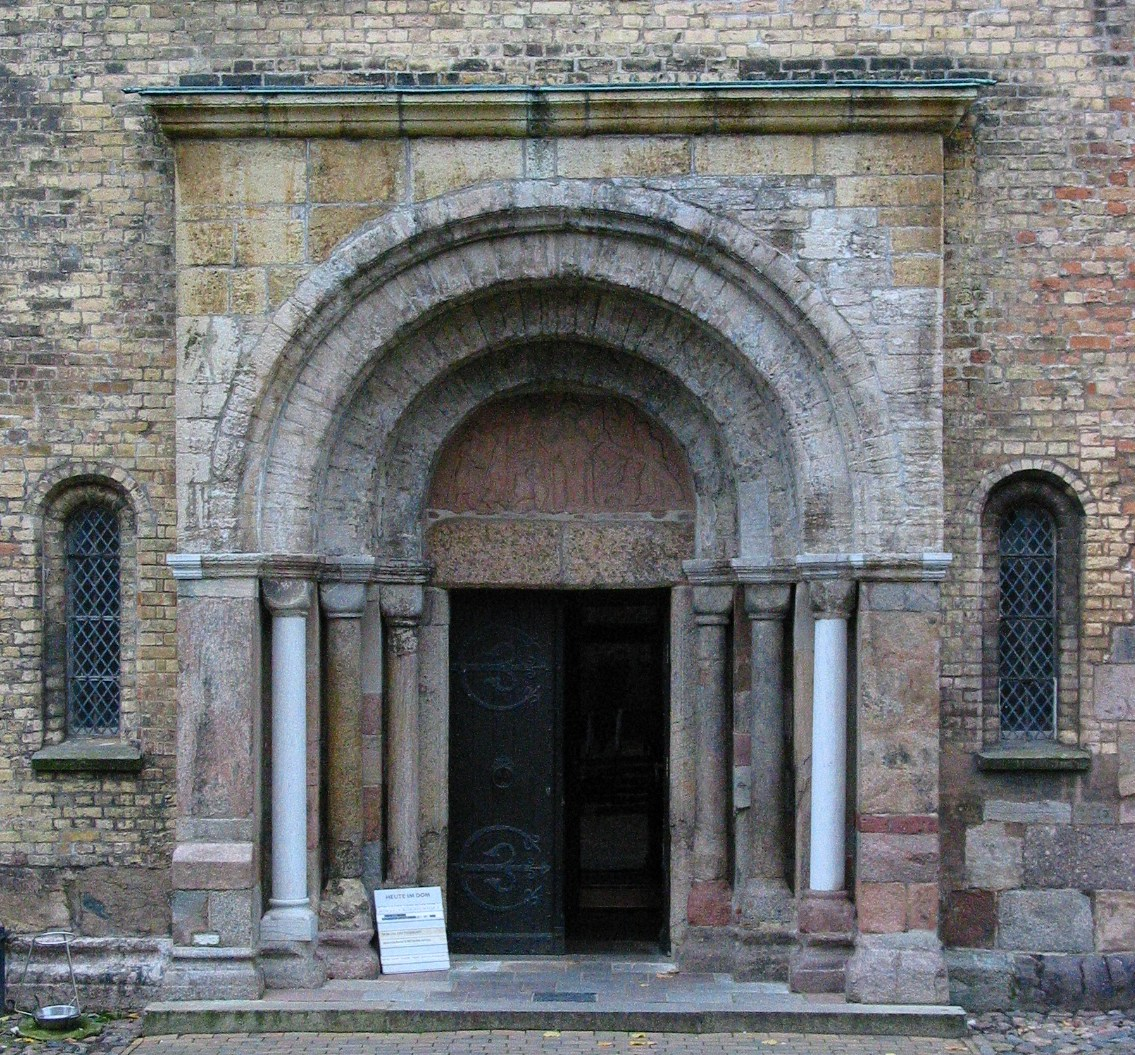
The Petri Portal ca. 1180

Access to the cathedral is granted through the romanesque Petri Portal, dating back to 1180.

A variety of materials were used for the portal's construction: granite, red sandstone from Skåne, limestone from Gotland and tuff from the Rhineland.

On the Tympanum, Christ is depicted amongst evangelists and saints. Presumably, the one holding the key is the disciple Peter, and the other one who is given the scroll with the Christian mission, is St. Paul.

Beside the portal, there is a weathered sculpture of a lion; another one can be found on the outer wall of the sacristy.

=== The sacristy ===
The sacristy, build around 1480, first served, indeed, as sacristy and conference room of the cathedral chapter (German: Domkapitel; an entity similar to a parochial church council that is tasked with the cathedral's day-to-day religious work) and since 1567 as classroom for the cathedral's school. After the Reformation, it was converted to a Fürstengruft (tomb for the princes) as tomb for the dukes of Holstein-Gottorp.

=== The High Choir ===
Bishop Berthold arranged for an expansion of the High Choir at the end of the 13th century. Also, frescos were added, depicting the Annunciation, the Coronation of Mary, St. Catherine, St. Philippus, St. Peter, Deesis and angels. The choir banks were manufactured by an unknown artist working under the pseudonym Magister rusticus at the beginning of the 16th century.

=== The Schwahl ===
The three-winged cloisters at the northern end of the nave, were constructed from 1310 to 1320, called the Schwahl (Danish: Svalen). The name has its root in the Danish-Low German dialect and means "cold alley". It was used mainly for processions that left and re-entered the church on that way. Here, restored frescos from the church's foundation can be found. They show the life of Christ as well as a selection of legendary creatures. During Advent, a small art market takes place in the cloisters.

=== The Brüggemann-Altar ===
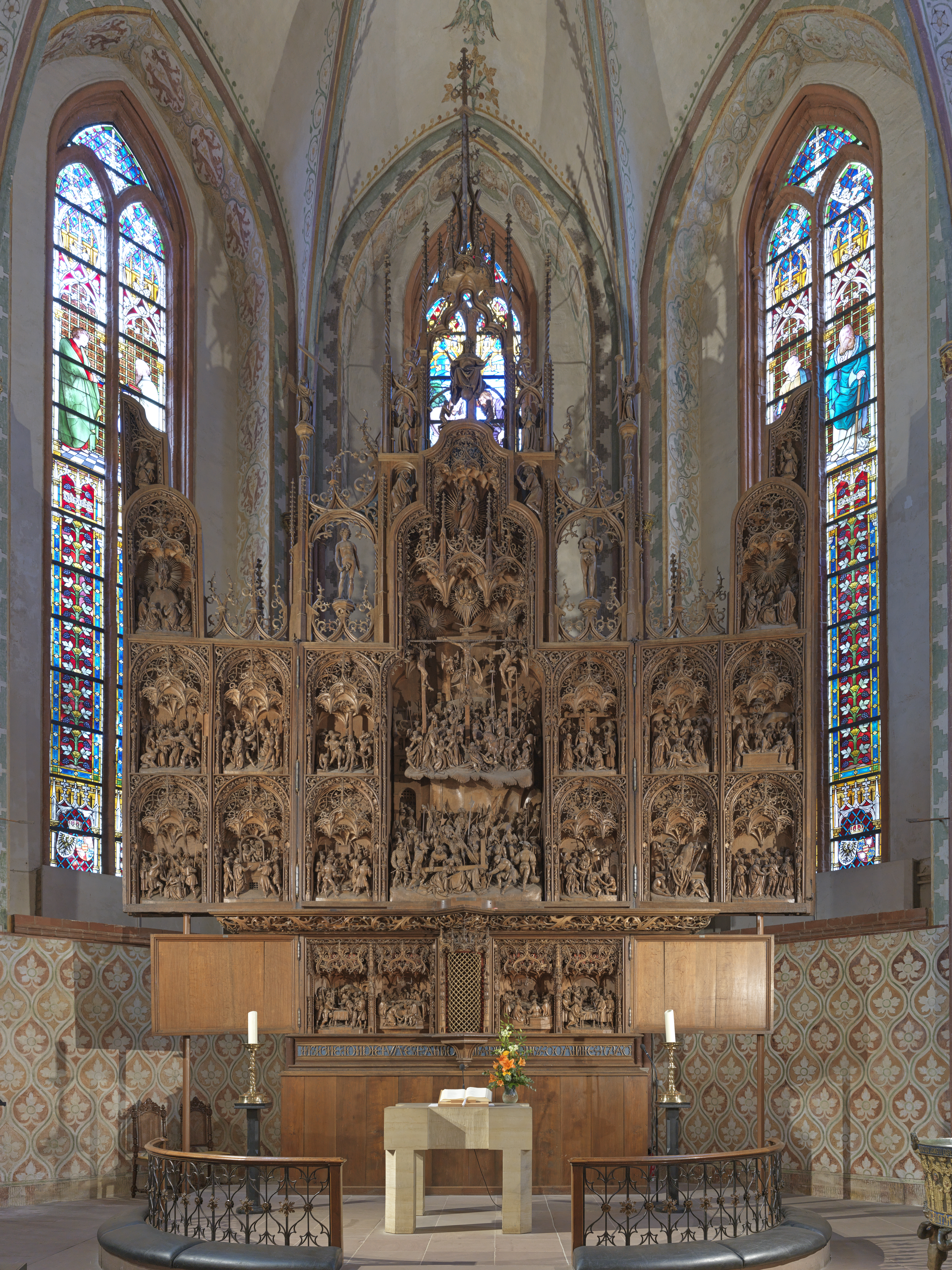
The altar, carved by Hans Brüggemann from 1514 to 1521 is the cathedral's main attraction

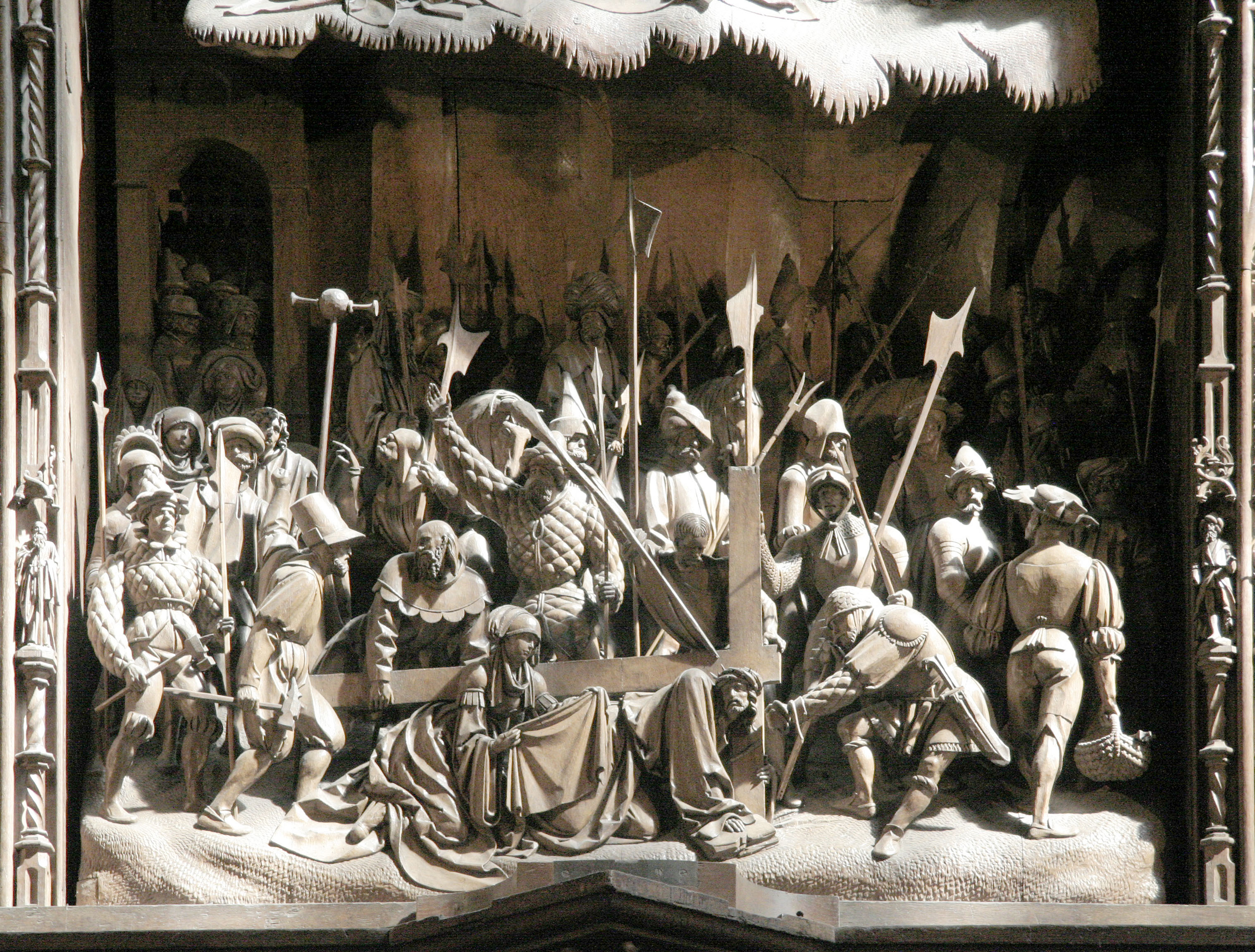
Detail from the centre of the Brüggemann-Alter: Jesus carrying the cross

The oak wood altar, carved by Hans Brüggemann from 1514 to 1521, is 12.60 meters high and depicts biblical history from Christ's arrest to Ascension (modelled after Albrecht Dürer's "Little Passion"). In the central piece, Jesus carrying the cross and the descent to hell are emphasized through larger carvings. Ascension and Pentecost are depicted on the altar wings. Next to the central piece, Adam and Eve can be seen. Above everything, Jesus Christ hovers as pantocrator.

Originally, the altar was manufactured for the Augustinian Chorherrenkirche (i.e. collegiate church) in Bordesholm. After the priory's dissolution, the Duke Christian Albrecht of Holstein-Gottorp arranged for the altar's transfer to Schleswig Cathedral in 1666. A young Emil Nolde helped with the altar's restoration in Flensburg at the end of the 19th century.

=== Cenotaph of Frederick I ===
In the northern choir nave, an elegant renaissance cenotaph for Frederick I, King of Denmark and Norway and Duke of Schleswig and Holstein, can be found. The tombstone, created for the choir in 1552 and put up there, was moved to its current position in 1901. It was called one of the "masterpieces of Dutch renaissance art in Northern Europe" (Marianne Mehling). Its creator is the Flemish sculptor Cornelis Floris de Vriendt. Instead of the usual seven virtues, the (empty) sarcophagus stands only on six.

=== The Blue Madonna ===
Jürgen Ovens (1623–1678) painted his Blue Madonna which was originally called Holy Family with Johannes, in 1669. It is situated on a pillar in the northern side nave. The influence of Anthony van Dyck is clearly visible on the baroque painting.

Jürgen Ovens, born 1623 in Tönning, was a pupil of Rembrandt's and court painter of the Dukes of Holstein-Gottorp. The Blue Madonna is his most famous painting. A self-portrait from 1691 can be found in the Laurentius Church in Tönning. Other works of Ovens can be seen in the State Museum of Schleswig-Holstein in Castle Gottorf.

=== Central Tower ===
The central tower was constructed by Friedrich Adler between 1888 and 1894 from brick. At 112 meters, it is the second-largest church spire in Schleswig-Holstein, after the Marienkirche in Lübeck. The tower had fallen into disrepair in the early 1950s and was restored from 1953 to 1956.

=== Burials ===
- Valdemar IV, Duke of Schleswig (?–1314)
- Eric II, Duke of Schleswig (1290–1325)
- Frederick I of Denmark
- Conrad von Reventlow
- Gustav Trolle
- Sophie of Pomerania
- Adolf, Duke of Holstein-Gottorp
- Christine of Hesse
- Frederick II, Duke of Holstein-Gottorp
- Philip, Duke of Holstein-Gottorp
- John Adolf, Duke of Holstein-Gottorp
- Augusta of Denmark
- Frederick III, Duke of Holstein-Gottorp
- Duchess Marie Elisabeth of Saxony
- Christian Albert, Duke of Holstein-Gottorp
- Princess Frederica Amalia of Denmark
- Frederick IV, Duke of Holstein-Gottorp
- Prince Charles of Hesse-Kassel
- Princess Louise of Denmark
- Prince Christian of Hesse
- Friedrich Wilhelm, Duke of Schleswig-Holstein-Sonderburg-Glücksburg
- Princess Louise Caroline of Hesse-Kassel
- Friedrich, Duke of Schleswig-Holstein-Sonderburg-Glücksburg
- Princess Adelheid of Schaumburg-Lippe
