= Frederick III of Holstein-Gottorp =

Duke of Holstein-Gottorp from 1616 to 1659

Frederick III
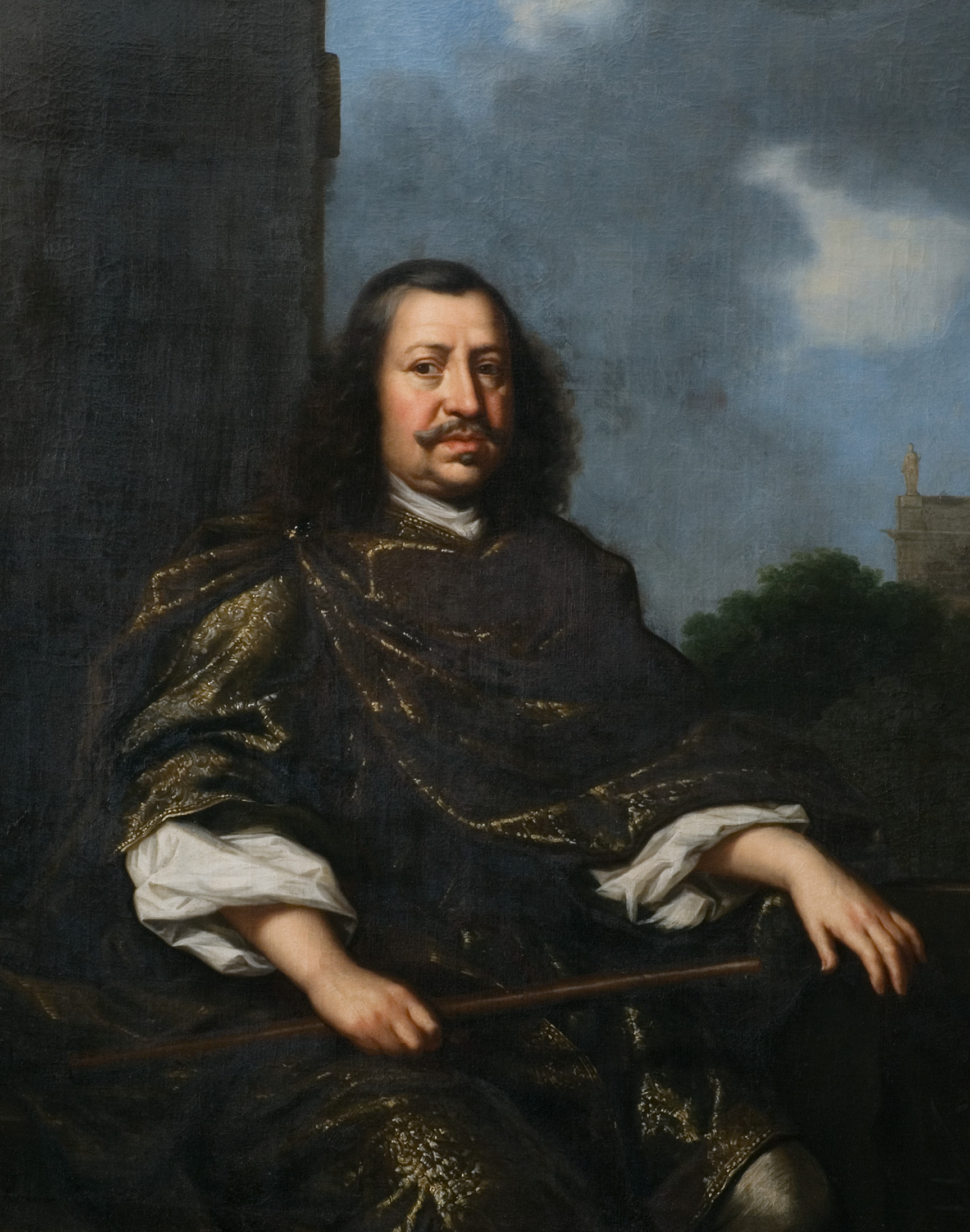
- Portrait by David Klöcker Ehrenstrahl

Duke of Holstein-Gottorp
- Reign: 31 March 1616 – 10 August 1659
- Predecessor: John Adolf
- Successor: Christian Albert
- Born: 22 December 1597; Gottorf Castle
- Died: 10 August 1659 (aged 61); Tönning
- Burial: Schleswig Cathedral
- Spouse: Duchess Marie Elisabeth of Saxony (m. 1630)
- Issue Detail: Sophie Augusta, Princess of Anhalt-Zerbst; Magdalena Sibylla, Duchess of Mecklenburg-Güstrow; Maria Elisabeth, Landgravine of Hesse-Darmstadt; Prince Frederick; Hedwig Eleonora, Queen of Sweden; Prince John George; Princess Anna Dorothea; Christian Albert, Duke of Holstein-Gottorp; Augustus Frederick, Prince-Regent of Eutin; Augusta Marie, Margravine of Baden-Durlach
- House: Holstein-Gottorp
- Father: John Adolf, Duke of Holstein-Gottorp
- Mother: Augusta of Denmark

Frederick III of Holstein-Gottorp (22 December 1597 – 10 August 1659) was a Duke of Holstein-Gottorp.

== Early life and youth ==
Born on 22 December 1597, he was the elder son of Duke Johann Adolf of Holstein-Gottorp and Princess Augusta of Denmark. His mother was the daughter of King Frederick II of Denmark.

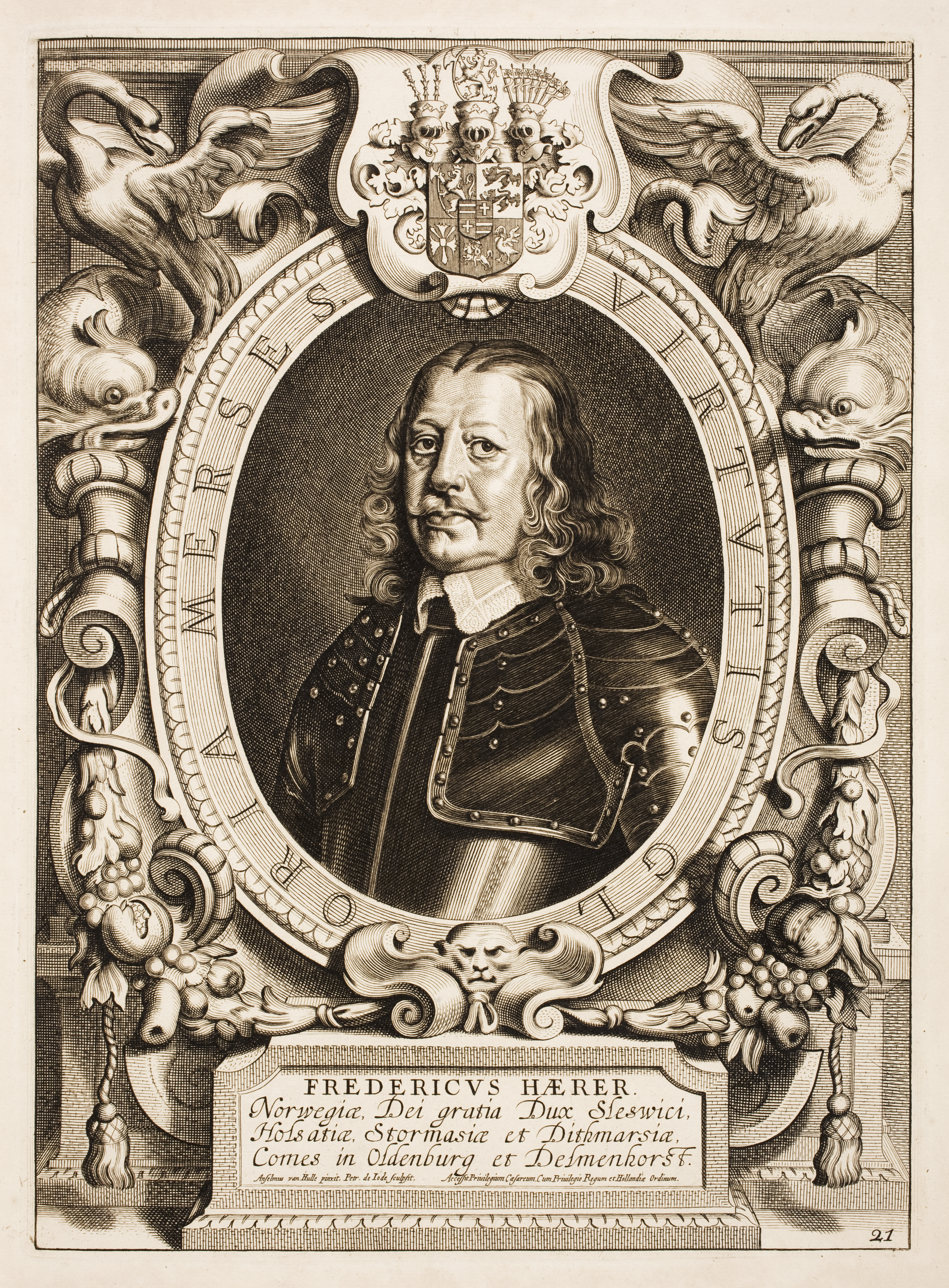
Portrait of Frederick III, Duke of Holstein-Gottorp by Anselm van Hulle

He had ambitious plans concerning the development of sea trade. With this purpose he established Friedrichstadt in 1621, in sympathy with city of Glückstadt established in 1617 by Christian IV of Denmark. Furthermore, he attempted to find a commercial way to Russia and Persia that would not pass around Africa. For this reason, he sent on 6 November 1633 the expedition from Hamburg to Moscow under the management of a commercial agent of Otto Brüggemann and a ducal adviser, Philipp Crusius, and with Adam Olearius as secretary. On 14 August 1634, the delegation arrived at Moscow. Although it was not successful in concluding a commercial agreement with Tsar Michael I of Russia, nevertheless, immediately after the return of the delegation to Gottorp on 6 April 1635, Frederick began the preparation of the following expedition. In 1636, he sent his delegation to Persia, and in 1639, Safi of Persia sent a return delegation with presents for the Duke.

The difficult task of leading the country through the Thirty Years' War confronted Frederick. He tried a policy of neutrality, which meant in practice the refusal of the union with Denmark and inclinations toward Sweden. In 1654, he hosted the recently abdicated Christina, Queen of Sweden. She wrote to her successor to recommend two of his daughters as potential brides. Thus, he married his daughter Hedvig Eleonora to King Charles X Gustav of Sweden. Since the Swedish attempt at being the Great Power ultimately failed, Frederick's pro-Swedish policy led to the weakening of the house of Holstein-Gottorp.

Frederick as the patron of art and culture was more successful. Thus, he founded on 3 September 1642 together with Prince Louis I of Anhalt-Köthen the Fruitbearing Society. Furthermore, he contributed to the creation of the Globe of Gottorf. The painter Jürgen Ovens worked more than 30 years for him and his successor Christian Albrecht of Holstein-Gottorp.

== Death ==
Frederick died on 10 August 1659 in the fortress of Tönning, while the fortress was besieged in the course of the Second Karl Gustav War between Denmark and Sweden.

== Family and Children ==
He was married in Dresden on 21 February 1630 to Princess Marie Elisabeth of Saxony, daughter of Elector John George I of Saxony and Magdalene Sibylle of Prussia. They had sixteen children in just over eighteen years, ten of whom lived to adulthood:

1. Sofie Auguste (5 December 1630 – 12 December 1680), married on 16 September 1649 to John VI, Prince of Anhalt-Zerbst. Mother of John Louis I, Prince of Anhalt-Dornburg, grandmother of Christian August, Prince of Anhalt-Zerbst, and great-grandmother of Catherine II of Russia.
2. Magdalene Sibylle (24 November 1631 – 22 September 1719), married on 28 November 1654 to Gustav Adolph, Duke of Mecklenburg-Güstrow. Mother of Louise of Mecklenburg-Güstrow, Queen of Denmark.
3. Johann Adolf (29 September 1632 – 19 November 1633), died in early childhood.
4. Marie Elisabeth (6 June 1634 – 17 June 1665), married on 24 November 1650 to Louis VI, Landgrave of Hesse-Darmstadt.
5. Friedrich (17 July 1635 – 12 August 1654), died unmarried.
6. Hedwig Eleonore (23 October 1636 – 24 November 1715), married on 24 October 1654 to King Charles X Gustav of Sweden.
7. Adolf August (1 September 1637 – 20 November 1637), died in infancy.
8. Johann Georg (8 August 1638 – 25 November 1655), died unmarried.
9. Anna Dorothea (13 February 1640 – 13 May 1713), died unmarried.
10. Christian Albert, Duke of Holstein-Gottorp (3 February 1641 – 6 January 1695), married on 24 October 1667 to Princess Frederica Amalia of Denmark.
11. Gustav Ulrich (16 March 1642 – 23 October 1642), died in infancy.
12. Christine Sabine (11 July 1643 – 20 March 1644), died in infancy.
13. August Friedrich (6 May 1646 – 2 October 1705), Prince-Regent of Eutin and Prince-Bishop of Lübeck; married on 21 June 1676 to Christine of Saxe-Weissenfels (daughter of Augustus, Duke of Saxe-Weissenfels, and his first wife Anna Maria of Mecklenburg-Schwerin); no issue.
14. Adolf (24 August 1647 – 27 December 1647), died in infancy.
15. Elisabeth Sofie (24 August 1647 – 16 November 1647), twin of Adolf, died in infancy.
16. Auguste Marie (6 February 1649 – 25 April 1728), married on 15 May 1670 to Frederick VII, Margrave of Baden-Durlach.

== Ancestors ==
Ancestors of Frederick III of Holstein-Gottorp

8. Frederick I of Denmark
4. Adolf, Duke of Holstein-Gottorp
9. Sophie of Pomerania
2. John Adolf, Duke of Holstein-Gottorp
10. Philip I, Landgrave of Hesse
5. Christine of Hesse
11. Christine of Saxony
1. Frederick III, Duke of Holstein-Gottorp
12. Christian III of Denmark
6. Frederick II of Denmark
13. Dorothea of Saxe-Lauenburg
3. Augusta of Denmark
14. Ulrich III, Duke of Mecklenburg
7. Sophie of Mecklenburg-Güstrow
15. Elizabeth of Denmark

== Embassies ==
- The Voyages and Travells of the Ambassadors Sent by Frederick Duke of Holstein, to the Great Duke of Muscovy, and the King of Persia: Begun in the Year M.DC.XXXIII, and Finish'd in M.DC.XXXIX : Containing a Compleat History of Muscovy, Tartary, Persia, and Other Adjacent Countries : with Several Publick Transactions Reaching Near the Present Times : in VII Books (1669)

== See also ==
- History of Schleswig-Holstein
- Globe of Gottorf

Frederick III of Holstein-Gottorp House of Holstein-Gottorp Cadet branch of the House of Oldenburg Born: 22 December 1597 Died: 10 August 1659
German nobility
Preceded by John Adolphus	— TITULAR — Duke of Holstein-Gottorp; 1616–1659	Succeeded by Christian Albrecht
Regnal titles
Preceded by Christian IV and John Adolphus (in condominial rule)	Duke of Holstein and Duke of Schleswig; 1616–1659 with Christian IV (1588–1648); Frederick III (1648–1670)	Succeeded by Frederick III and Christian Albert (in condominial rule)
