= Conrad Christian Bøhndel =

Danish painter and lithographer

- Born: 7 March 1779; Hostrup, Tønder, Denmark
- Died: 18 December 1847 (aged 68)
- Education: Royal Danish Academy of Fine Arts
- Notable work: Der Bordesholmer Altar
- Style: lithography painting

Conrad Christian August Bøhndel (7 March 1779 – 18 December 1847) was a Danish painter and lithographer. He lithographed the Hans Brüggemann's altarpiece between 1824 and 1832.

== Biography ==
Conrad Christian Bøhndel was born in the parish of Hostrup in Tønder, Denmark. He was the son of Christian August Bøhndel and Frederikke Louise, née Staack. He went to Copenhagen as a young man to be trained as an artist at the Royal Danish Academy of Fine Arts. He belonged to the circle of friends of Caspar David Friedrich when he first arrived in Copenhagen in 1799. After his studies at the Art Academy he visited the German painter Philipp Otto Runge in Dresden in 1802.

In 1799 he won the Great Silver Medal and undertook an overseas trip with royal support, joining the Danish-German colony in Rome where he stayed from 1802 to 1810. He befriended Bertel Thorvaldsen, especially through his old classmate Johan Ludwig Lund. After his return to Copenhagen he showed a portion of his trip abroad in an art exhibition in 1811. Although his work at the academy lacked accuracy in drawing and harmony in color, his pictures were so very good that he was conferred an agré in 1812. A year later he painted the architect Christian Frederik Hansen and Count Heinrich Carl von Schimmelmann's portraits.

He appears to have lived in the District of Schleswig, where between 1824 and 1832, he lithographed the panel compositions of the altarpiece (Der Bordesholmer Altar) at Schleswig Cathedral which was originally carved by Hans Brüggemann between 1514 and 1521. Considered a respectable piece of work at the time, his work comprised 34 plates with a translated text in German by Niels Laurits Høyen.

== Personal life ==
He was married to a widow Anna Maria Struck (1777–1830). He died in the Duchy of Schleswig in 1847.
