= John Adolf, Duke of Holstein-Gottorp =

John Adolf
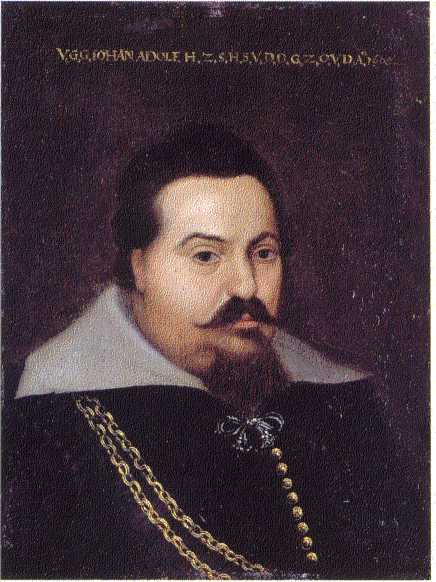
- Portrait, c. 1600–1616

Duke of Holstein-Gottorp
- Reign: 18 October 1590 – 31 March 1616
- Predecessor: Philip
- Successor: Frederick III
- Born: 27 February 1575; Gottorf Castle
- Died: 31 March 1616 (aged 41); Schleswig
- Burial: Schleswig Cathedral
- Spouse: Augusta of Denmark (m. 1596)
- Issue Detail: Frederick III, Duke of Holstein-Gottorp; Elisabeth Sofie, Duchess of Saxe-Lauenburg; Adolf of Schleswig-Holstein-Gottorp; Dorothea Augusta, Duchess of Schleswig-Holstein-Sonderburg-Plön.; Hedwig, Countess Palatine of Sulzbach; Princess Anna; John X of Schleswig-Holstein-Gottorp
- House: Holstein-Gottorp, Oldenburg
- Father: Adolf, Duke of Holstein-Gottorp
- Mother: Christine of Hesse

Johann Adolf of Holstein-Gottorp (27 February 1575 – 31 March 1616) was a Duke of Holstein-Gottorp.

== Life ==
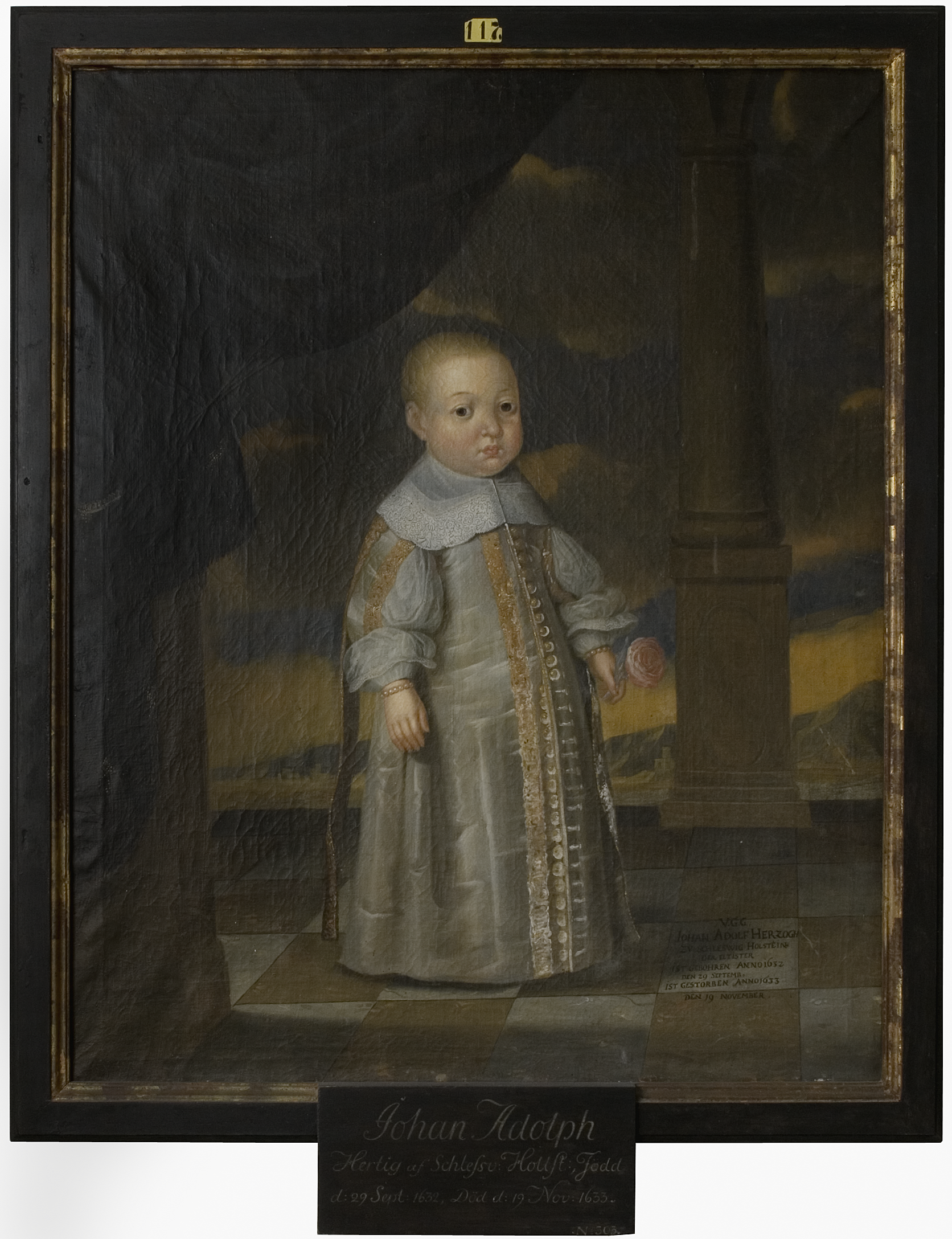
Portrait of John Adolf as a child

He was a third son of Duke Adolf of Holstein-Gottorp and his wife Christine of Hesse-Kassel (or Hesse-Cassel). He became the first Lutheran Administrator of the Prince-Bishopric of Lübeck (1586–1607) and the Administrator of the Prince-Archbishopric of Bremen (1589–1596). He became the Duke after the deaths of his two elder brothers; as Duke of a sovereign state in the early 17th century, he became involved with the religious wars of the time.

After succeeding his brother as Duke in 1590, the Bremian Chapter enforced his resignation in favour of his younger brother John Frederick of Holstein-Gottorp, Prince-Bishop.

=== Diplomatic efforts ===
John Adolf entered into a secret treaty with his cousin, King Christian IV, to suppress the nobility, in 1608. He wrote at least one diplomatic letter to Queen Elizabeth I.

=== Patronages ===
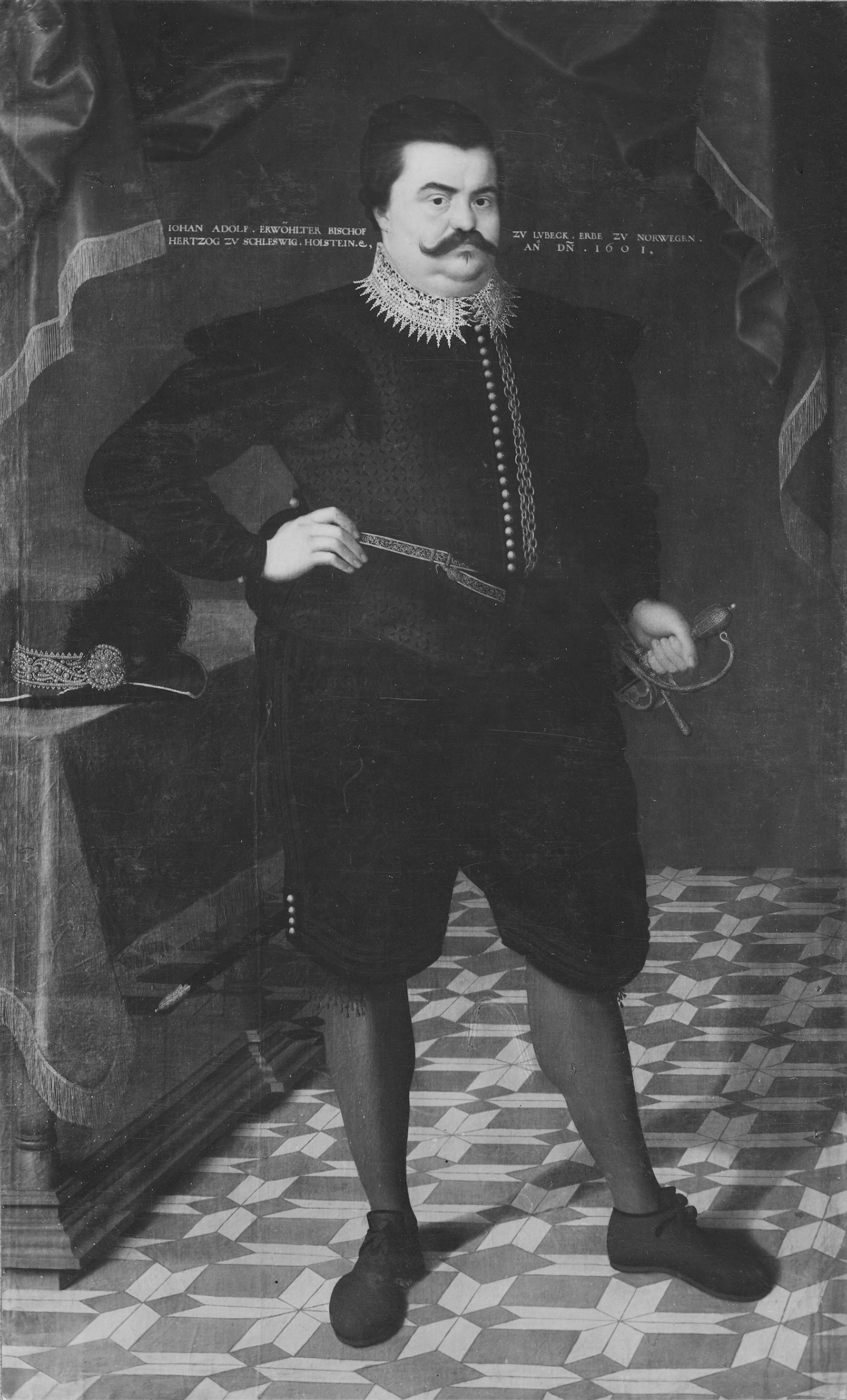
Portrait of John Adolf by an anonymous artist, 1601

He donated to the Hamburg Confraternity of Saint Anne of the Iceland Merchants, which indicated that he was involved in trade with Iceland. He was also a patron of touring English theatre troupes.

== Family and children ==
He was married on 30 August 1596 to Princess Augusta of Denmark, daughter of King Frederick II of Denmark. They had the following children:

1. Frederick III of Holstein-Gottorp (22 December 1597 – 10 August 1659).
2. Elisabeth Sofie (12 October 1599 – 25 November 1627), married on 5 March 1621 to Duke Augustus of Saxe-Lauenburg.
3. Adolf (15 September 1600 – 19 September 1631).
4. Dorothea Auguste (12 May 1602 – 13 March 1682), married in 1633 to Joachim Ernest, Duke of Schleswig-Holstein-Sonderburg-Plön.
5. Hedwig (23 December 1603 – 22 March 1657), married on 15 July 1620 to Augustus, Count Palatine of Sulzbach.
6. Anna (19 December 1604 – 20 March 1623).
7. John (18 March 1606 – 21 February 1655).
8. Christian, died young in 1609.

== Ancestors ==
Ancestors of John Adolf, Duke of Holstein-Gottorp

16. Dietrich, Count of Oldenburg
8. Christian I of Denmark
17. Hedvig of Holstein
4. Frederick I of Denmark
18. John, Margrave of Brandenburg-Kulmbach
9. Dorothea of Brandenburg
19. Barbara of Saxe-Wittenberg
2. Adolf, Duke of Holstein-Gottorp
20. Eric II, Duke of Pomerania
10. Bogislaw X, Duke of Pomerania
21. Sophia of Pomerania-Stolp
5. Sophie of Pomerania
22. Casimir IV Jagiellon
11. Anna Jagiellon
23. Elizabeth of Austria
1. John Adolf, Duke of Holstein-Gottorp
24. Louis II, Landgrave of Lower Hesse
12. William II, Landgrave of Hesse
25. Mechthild of Württemberg-Urach
6. Philip I, Landgrave of Hesse
26. Magnus II, Duke of Mecklenburg
13. Anna of Mecklenburg-Schwerin
27. Sophie of Pomerania-Stettin
3. Christine of Hesse
28. Albert III, Duke of Saxony
14. George, Duke of Saxony
29. Sidonie Podiebrad
7. Christine of Saxony
30. Casimir IV Jagiellon (= 22)
15. Barbara Jagiellon
31. Elizabeth of Austria (= 23)

== See also ==
- History of Schleswig-Holstein

== Bibliography ==
- Die Fürsten des Landes: Herzöge und Grafen von Schleswig, Holstein und Lauenburg [De slevigske hertuger; German], Carsten Porskrog Rasmussen (ed.) on behalf of the Gesellschaft für Schleswig-Holsteinische Geschichte, Neumünster: Wachholtz, 2008, pp. 73-109, here pp. 87seq. ISBN 978-3-529-02606-5

John Adolf, Duke of Holstein-Gottorp House of Holstein-Gottorp Cadet branch of the House of Oldenburg Born: 27 February 1575 Died: 31 March 1616
Regnal titles
Religious titles
Vacant Title last held by Henry III of Saxe-Lauenburg (Lutheran Administrator, 1568-1585); 1585–1589 rule by Bremen's Chapter and Estates in custodianship for the minor John Adolf	Prince-Archbishop of Bremen; 1589–1596 (Lutheran Administrator)	Succeeded by John Frederick of Holstein-Gottorp (Lutheran Administrator)
Preceded by Eberhard II von Holle	Prince-Bishop of Lübeck; 1586–1607 (Lutheran Administrator)	Succeeded by John Frederick of Holstein-Gottorp (Lutheran Administrator)
German nobility
Preceded by Philip	— TITULAR — Duke of Holstein-Gottorp; 1590–1616	Succeeded by Frederick III
Regnal titles
Preceded by Christian IV of Denmark and Philip (in condominial rule)	Duke of Holstein and Duke of Schleswig; 1590–1616 with Christian IV (1590–1616)	Succeeded by Christian IV and Frederick III (in condominial rule)
