= Hans the Elder, Duke of Schleswig-Holstein-Haderslev =

Hans the Elder
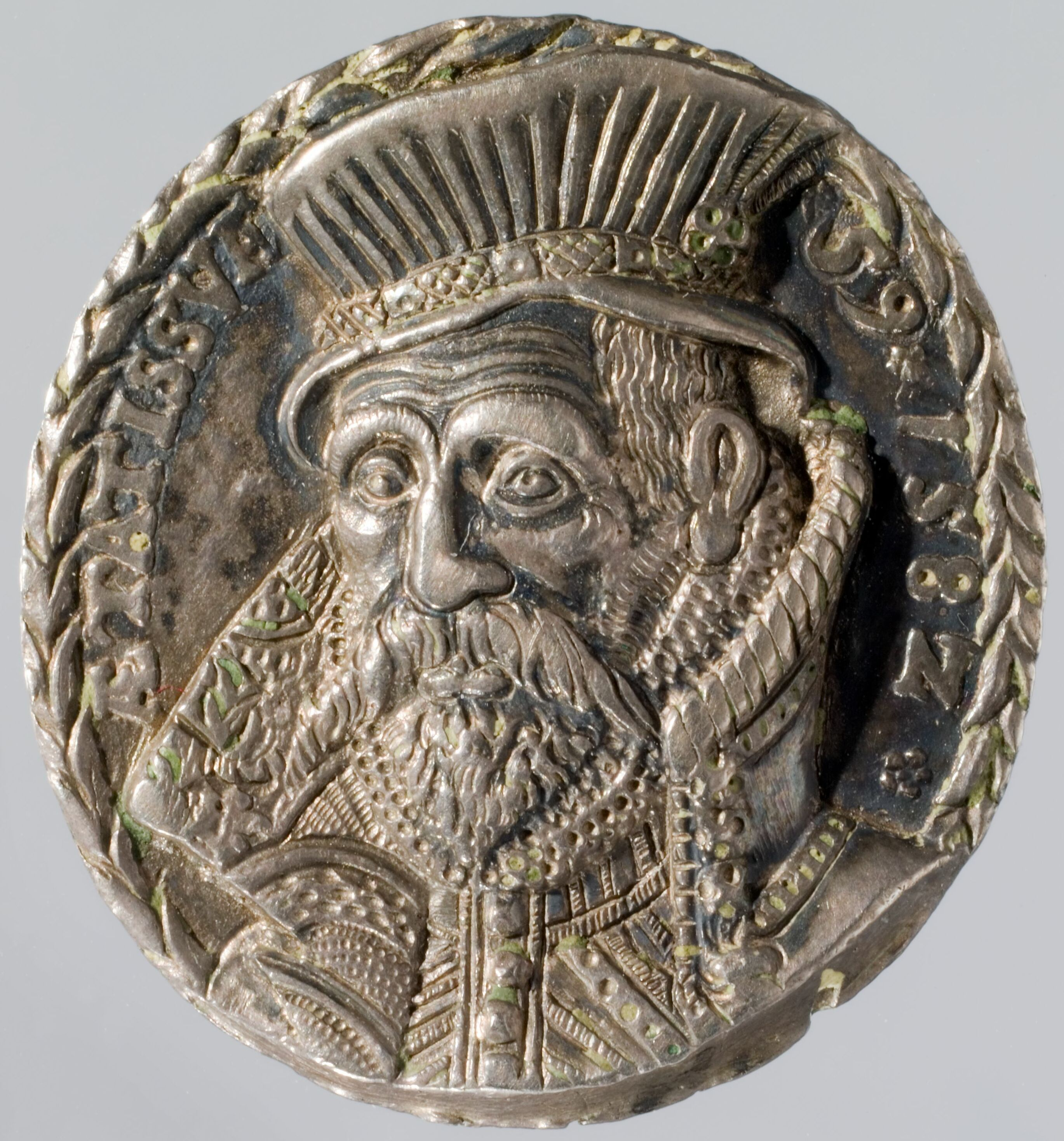

Duke of Schleswig-Holstein-Haderslev
- Reign: 1544–1580
- Born: 21 June 1521; Haderslevhus Castle, Haderslev, Denmark
- Died: 1 October 1580 (aged 59); Hansborg Castle, Haderslev, Denmark
- Burial: February 1581; Schleswig Cathedral
- House: Oldenburg
- Father: Frederick I of Denmark
- Mother: Sophie of Pomerania
- Religion: Lutheranism

Hans the Elder (also John the Elder; Danish: Hans den Ældre, German: Johann der Ältere; 29 June 1521 – 1 October 1580) was the only Duke of Schleswig-Holstein-Haderslev. The predicate the Elder is used to distinguish him from his nephew, Hans the Younger, who held Sønderborg from 1564 as a partitioned-off duke. He ruled the duchies of Schleswig and Holstein jointly with his brother Duke Adolf, and his half-brother, King Christian III of Denmark and his successor, King Frederick II.

== Family ==
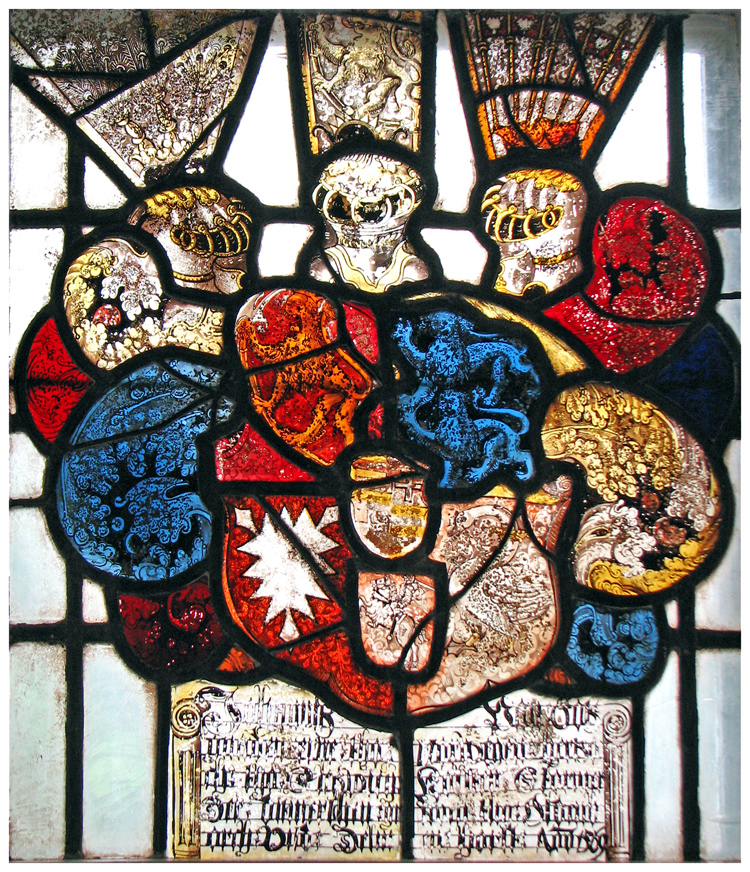
Arms of the Duke

Hans was born in Haderslev as the son of King Frederick I of Denmark and his second wife, Sophie of Pomerania.

As a possible heir to the throne, he enjoyed a careful education and spent several years at the court of his brother-in-law Albert, Duke of Prussia, in Königsberg. This was in Lutheran Ducal Prussia, a Polish fief, modernized into a secular state from the Teutonic State of Prussia since 1525.

This successful policy would be seminal for Hans's understanding of politics and governing of the state, as he also never became a fully sovereign Duke or Prince.

== Reign as Duke (1544–1580) ==
From 1544, Hans ruled the duchies of Schleswig and of Holstein jointly with his brother, Adolf of Denmark, and his half-brother, King Christian III of Denmark. He ruled from Haderslevhus Castle and later built Hansborg Castle in his hometown, a magnificent Renaissance palace situated east of the city of Haderslev.

His territory consisted of the Counties of Haderslev, including Tørning, Tønder, and Løgumkloster, and the islands of Nordstrand and Fehmarn in Schleswig, plus Rendsburg and some smaller communities in Holstein.

During his reign, Hans joined the Reformation and founded several social and educational institutions, notably the Duke Hans Hospital in Haderslev. He introduced many reforms to the legal system and was regarded as a dedicated judge. As one of the first rulers between the seas, he sat down for an active land reclamation and coastal protection program, presumably, he ruled over the most vulnerable stretch of the Schleswig coastline. In 1559, Hans, his brother Adolf, and King Christian's successor, Frederick II of Denmark, occupied the independent peasant Republic of Dithmarschen, and divided it among themselves.

== Death ==
Hans died unmarried and childless in Haderslev, Southern Denmark on 2 Oct 1580, at the age of 59. His body was buried in the Schleswig Cathedral, Schleswig-Holstein, Germany.

After his death, his territory was divided between his brother Adolf and his nephew, King Frederick II of Denmark.

== Legacy ==
In contrast to most of the dukes of Schleswig and Holstein, posterity has a very positive view of Hans the Elder. This holds especially for his capital Haderslev, which was a ducal residence only during his time and has benefited ever since. He is still popular as a sort of patron saint. The largest annual summer festival in Haderslev, the Hertug-Hans-Fest is named after, and the local brewery Fuglsang has named a beer after him (Hertug Hans Pils). The hospital which he founded still bears his name. His judgments were fully published in book form (De Hansborgske Dømme).

== Ancestry ==
Ancestors of Hans the Elder, Duke of Schleswig-Holstein-Haderslev

16. Christian V, Count of Oldenburg
8. Dietrich, Count of Oldenburg
17. Agnes of Hohnstein-Heringen
4. Christian I of Denmark
18. Gerhard VI, Count of Holstein-Rendsburg
9. Hedvig of Holstein
19. Catherine Elisabeth of Brunswick-Lüneburg
2. Frederick I of Denmark
20. Frederick I, Elector of Brandenburg
10. John, Margrave of Brandenburg-Kulmbach
21. Elisabeth of Bavaria
5. Dorothea of Brandenburg
22. Rudolph III, Duke of Saxe-Wittenberg
11. Barbara of Saxe-Wittenberg
23. Barbara of Legnica
1. John II, Duke of Schleswig-Holstein-Haderslev
24. Wartislaw IX, Duke of Pomerania
12. Eric II, Duke of Pomerania
25. Sophia of Saxe-Lauenburg
6. Bogislaw X, Duke of Pomerania
26. Bogislaw IX, Duke of Pomerania
13. Sophie of Pomerania
27. Maria of Masovia
3. Sophie of Pomerania
28. Jogaila
14. Casimir IV Jagiellon
29. Sophia of Halshany
7. Anna Jagiellon
30. Albert II of Germany
15. Elisabeth of Austria
31. Elizabeth of Luxembourg

== Sources ==
- Thomas Otto Achelis: Haderslev i gamle Dage 1292–1626, Haderslev, 1929
- Troels Fink: Hertug Hans den Ældre, in: Sønderjyske Årbøger, 1997, p. 37–58
- Lennart S. Madsen: Junker Christian og hertug Hans den Ældre, in: Inge Adriansen, Lennart S. Madsen and Carsten Porskrog Rasmussen: De slesvigske hertuger, Aabenraa, 2005, p. 87–118
- Emilie Andersen (ed.): De Hansborgske Registranter, two volumes, Copenhagen 1943 and 1949
- Emilie Andersen (ed.): De Hansborgske Domme 1545–1578, three volumes, Copenhagen, 1994

Hans of Schleswig-Holstein-Haderslev House of Schleswig-Holstein-Haderslev Cadet branch of the House of Oldenburg Born: 29 June 1521 in Haderslev Died: 1 October 1580 in Haderslev
Regnal titles
New title sharing rule and revenues in Holstein and Schleswig among the brothers	— TITULAR — Duke of Schleswig-Holstein-Haderslev; 1544–1580	no issue his brother and nephew inherited
Preceded by Christian III	Duke of Holstein and Duke of Schleswig; 1544–1580 with Adolf (1544–1586); Christian III (1523–1559); Frederick II (1559–1588)	Succeeded by Adolf and Frederick II (in condominial rule)
