= Hans Brüggemann =

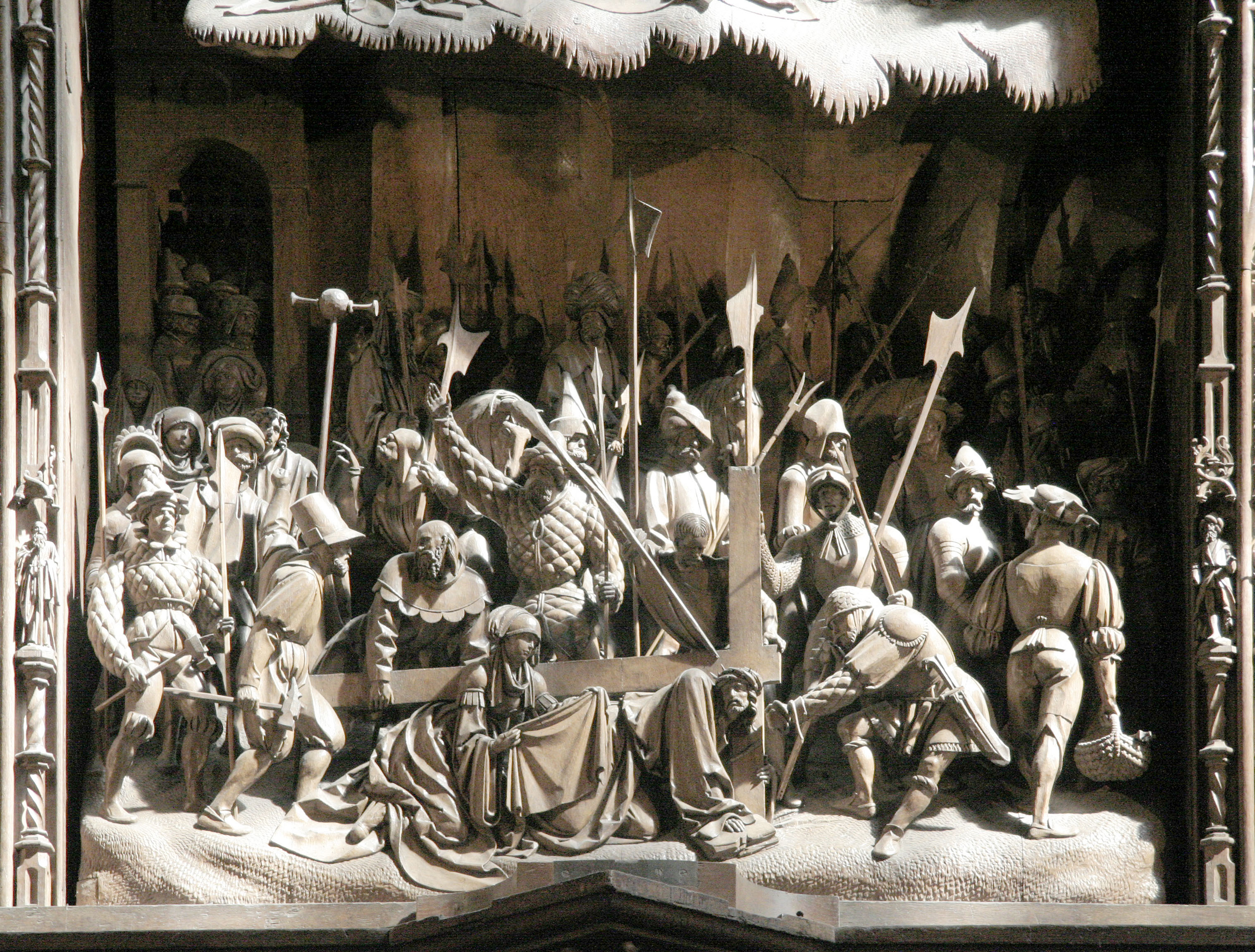
Hans Brüggemann: Bordesholm Altar (detail)

Hans Brüggemann (ca. 1480 – after 1521) was a German artist who is remembered above all for the large carved altarpiece which now stands in Schleswig Cathedral.

== Biography ==
Brüggemann is believed to have been born in Walsrode near Hanover around 1480 and to have perfected his art by travelling to Bremen, Münster, the lower Rhine and Antwerp before returning to Husum where he established his workshop. Few details of his life remain but there is a contract from 1523 between the parish council of Walsrode and Hans Brüggemann commissioning him to produce a small altarpiece for the local church. Brüggemann is remembered above all for his fine Bordesholm Altar, designed for Bordesholm Abbey near Neumünster but moved to Schleswig Cathedral in 1666. An inscription on the altarpiece states that it was completed in 1521. Other works include the figure of St George for St Mary's Church in Husum (now in the National Museum of Denmark) and the so-called "Little Bordesholm Altar", originally produced for Brügge/Holstein but later (in 1666) moved to Bordesholm Abbey Church to replace the great altarpiece. It can now be seen in the museum at Gottorf Castle. Other works ascribed to Brüggemann without any certainty include the wooden sculpture of St Christopher with the infant Jesus in Schleswig Cathedral and a few other altarpieces in Northern Germany. Brüggemann's work is said to have been inspired by Albrecht Dürer.

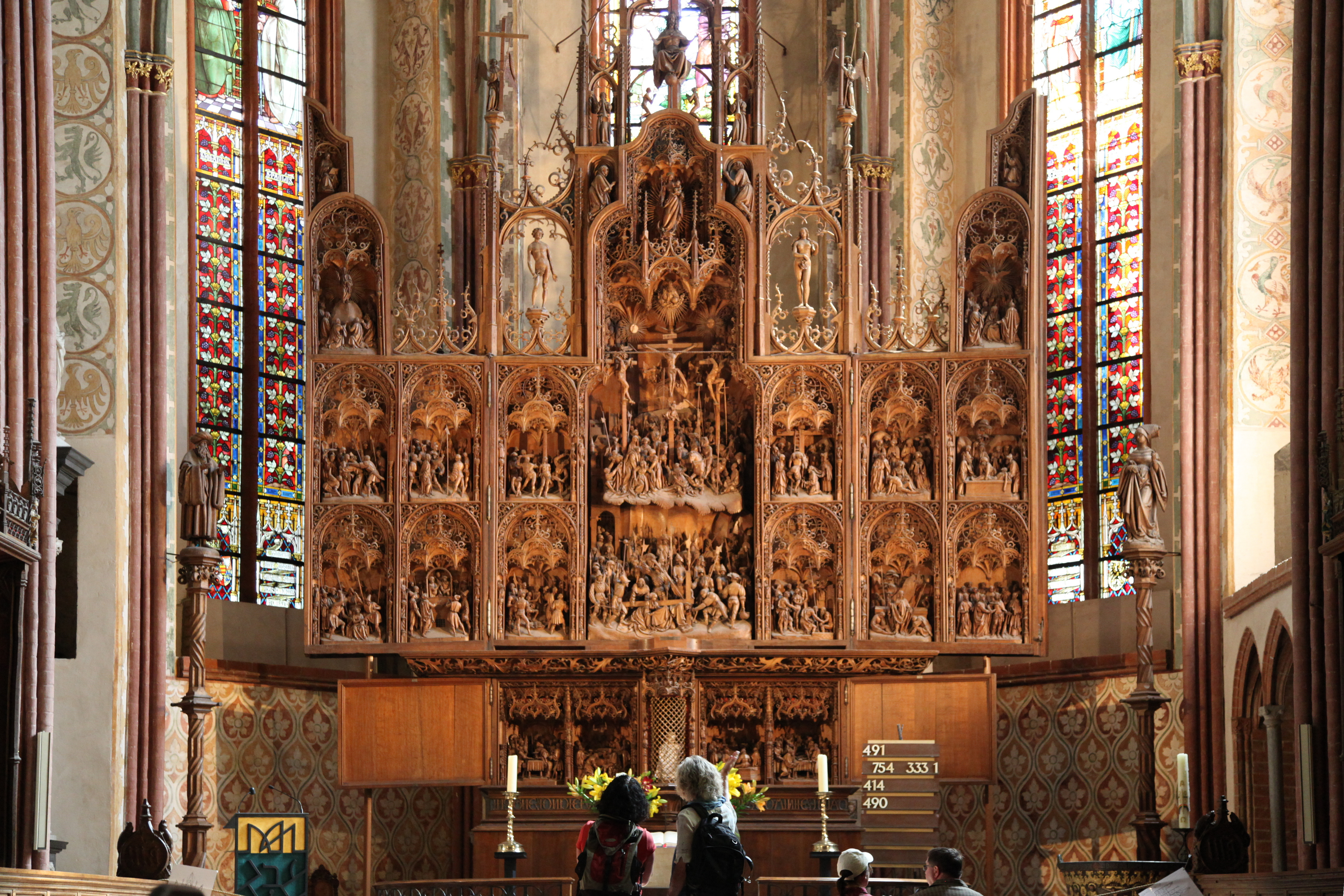
Bordesholm Altar in Schleswig Cathedral

== Bordesholm Altar ==
With its finely carved unpainted figures, the huge altarpiece is unique in northern German art of the period. It contains reliefs with 16 scenes from the Passion with a total of some 400 figures. The detail and composition of the individual reliefs and the style of the figures indicate influence from the Netherlands and southern Germany. The high degree of perspective with freely sculpted foreground figures appears to reflect the style of Tilman Riemenschneider and Albrecht Dürer. While the scenes have a Renaissance appearance, the decoration and overall design is distinctly Gothic. Overall, the altar has an almost chaotic look but each of the individual scenes reveals Brüggemann's fine skills depicting Adam and Eve covering their nakedness or the expressions of Christ and Abraham being freed from the land of the dead.

== See also ==
- Danish sculpture
