= Frederick of Denmark (bishop) =

Prince-Bishop of Hildesheim
- Reign: 1551–1556

Bishop of Schleswig
- Born: 13 April 1532
- Died: 7 October 1556 (aged 24)
- House: Oldenburg
- Father: Frederick I of Denmark
- Mother: Sophie of Pomerania
- Religion: Lutheranism

Frederick of Denmark (13 April 1532 – 7 October 1556) was the youngest son of Frederick I of Denmark and Sophie of Pomerania. He was the Prince-Bishop of Hildesheim and Bishop of Schleswig. Frederick was born on 11 April 1532 as the youngest son of Frederick I of Denmark and Sophie of Pomarania. As the youngest son, he was proclaimed the Prince-Bishop of Hildesheim and Bishop of Schleswig. He died on 7 October 1556 unmarried. He probably died of natural causes although not much is known about him.

Frederick of Denmark House of Oldenburg Born: 13 April 1532 Died: 7 October 1556
Titles in Lutheranism
Preceded by Tilemann von Hussen	Bishop of Schleswig; 1551–1556	Succeeded by Adolf, Duke of Holstein-Gottorp
Regnal titles
Religious titles
Preceded by Valentin of Teutleben	Prince-Bishop of Hildesheim; 1551–1556	Succeeded by Burkhard of Oberg
