= Frederick II of Holstein-Gottorp =

16th Century Duke of Holstein-Gottorp

Frederick II, Duke of Holstein-Gottorp
- Born: 21 April 1568
- Died: 15 June 1587 (aged 19)
- Noble family: House of Holstein-Gottorp
- Father: Adolf, Duke of Holstein-Gottorp
- Mother: Christine of Hesse

Frederick II, Duke of Holstein-Gottorp (21 April 1568 – 15 June 1587) was a Danish-German nobleman. He was the eldest son of Duke Adolf of Holstein-Gottorp and his wife, Christine of Hesse (1543–1604).

He inherited the ducal share of rule in the royal Danish-ducal condominium of the duchies of Holstein and of Schleswig when his father died in 1586, and died only a year later.

== Ancestors ==
Ancestors of Frederick II of Holstein-Gottorp

16. Dietrich, Count of Oldenburg
8. Christian I of Denmark
17. Hedvig of Holstein
4. Frederick I of Denmark
18. John, Margrave of Brandenburg-Kulmbach
9. Dorothea of Brandenburg
19. Barbara of Saxe-Wittenberg
2. Adolf, Duke of Holstein-Gottorp
20. Eric II, Duke of Pomerania
10. Bogislaw X, Duke of Pomerania
21. Sophia of Pomerania-Stolp
5. Sophie of Pomerania
22. Casimir IV Jagiellon
11. Anna Jagiellon
23. Elizabeth of Austria
1. Frederick II, Duke of Holstein-Gottorp
24. Louis II, Landgrave of Lower Hesse
12. William II, Landgrave of Hesse
25. Mechthild of Württemberg-Urach
6. Philip I, Landgrave of Hesse
26. Magnus II, Duke of Mecklenburg
13. Anna of Mecklenburg-Schwerin
27. Sophie of Pomerania-Stettin
3. Christine of Hesse
28. Albert III, Duke of Saxony
14. George, Duke of Saxony
29. Sidonie Podiebrad
7. Christine of Saxony
30. Casimir IV Jagiellon (= 22)
15. Barbara Jagiellon
31. Elizabeth of Austria (= 23)

Frederick II of Holstein-Gottorp House of Holstein-Gottorp Cadet branch of the House of Oldenburg Born: 21 April 1568 Died: 15 June 1587
Regnal titles
Preceded by Adolf and Frederick II of Denmark	Duke of Holstein and Schleswig; 1586–1587 with Frederick II of Denmark (1586–1587)	Succeeded by Frederick II of Denmark and Philip
