= Schleswig-Holstein-Haderslev =

Schleswig-Holstein-Hadersleben
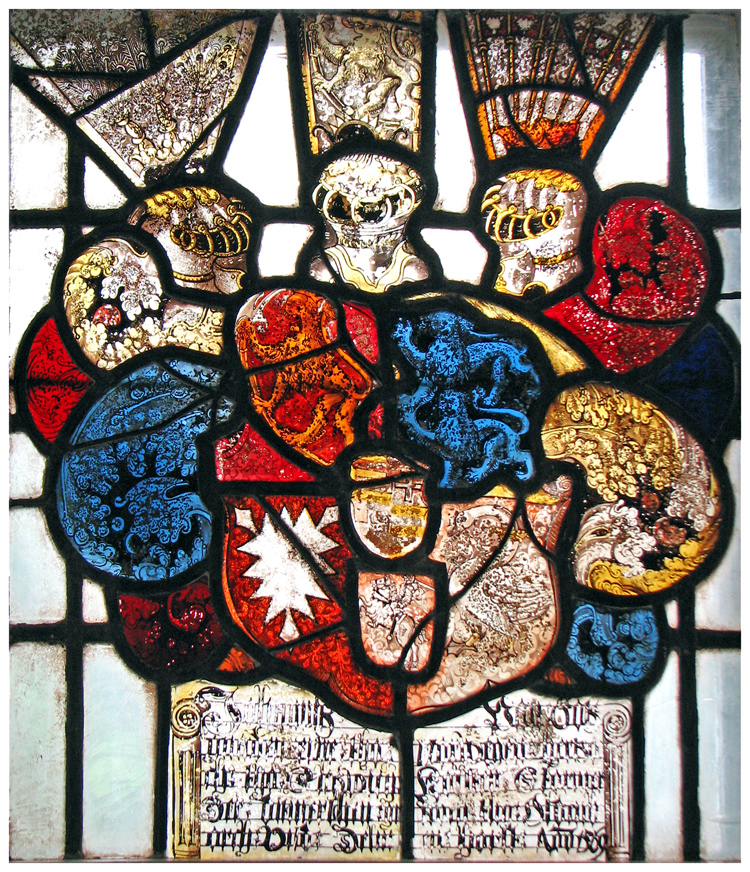
- Coat of arms of John II.
- House: House of Oldenburg

Schleswig-Holstein-Hadersleben (Danish: Slesvig-Holsten-Haderslev) was a branch line of the House of Oldenburg, and of the territory held by the Duke of this branch.

It was founded in 1544 by John II, as was compensated for not inheriting the Danish throne, with parts of Schleswig and Holstein. John II died childless in 1580, and the line died out with his death.

The territory consisted of the Ämter Haderslev, including Tørning, Tønder and Løgumkloster and this islands of Nordstrand, Germany and Fehmarn in Schleswig, plus Rendsburg and some smaller communities in Holstein, and after 1559 the middle part of Dithmarschen.

== See also ==
- History of Schleswig-Holstein
- House of Oldenburg
