= Christine of Hesse =

16th-century German noblewoman

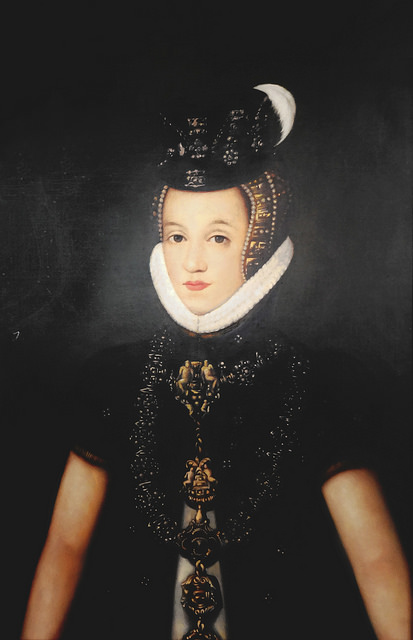
- 16th century portrait

Duchess consort of Holstein-Gottorp
- Tenure: 17 December 1564 – 1 October 1586
- Born: 29 June 1543; Kassel
- Died: 13 May 1604 (aged 60); Kiel
- Spouse: Adolf, Duke of Holstein-Gottorp (m. 1564; died 1586)
- Issue: Frederick II, Duke of Holstein-Gottorp; Sophia, Duchess of Mecklenburg; Philip, Duke of Holstein-Gottorp; Christine, Queen of Sweden; Elisabeth; Johann Adolf, Duke of Holstein-Gottorp; Anna, Countess of East Frisia; Bishop John Frederick
- House: House of Hesse
- Father: Philip I, Landgrave of Hesse
- Mother: Christine of Saxony

Christine of Hesse (29 June 1543 – 13 May 1604) was Duchess consort of Holstein-Gottorp as the spouse of Duke Adolf of Holstein-Gottorp. She exerted some political influence as a widow after 1586.

== Biography ==
Christine was born in Kassel as a daughter of Landgrave Philip I of Hesse and his spouse Christine of Saxony. She was given a strict Protestant upbringing by her aunt Elizabeth, Dowager Duchess of Saxony.

Christine received a proposal from King Eric XIV of Sweden, but this did not come about. Her wedding celebration resulted in a scandal, when the guests at the wedding reception consumed too much alcohol. In 1565, the Gottorf Castle was destroyed by fire, which cost her her personal possessions.

As duchess, Christine supported churches and schools and scholarships to poor students in theology. She was interested in medicine, and also manufactured her own medicines.

As a widow after 1586, Christine defended the rights of her son Philip against the council.

Christine composed the psalm-book Geistliche Psalmen und Lieder (1590).

== Family and children ==
On 17 December 1564 Christine was married to Duke Adolf of Holstein-Gottorp and had the following children:

1. Frederick II (21 April 1568 – 15 June 1587).
2. Sophia (1 June 1569 – 14 November 1634), married on 17 February 1588 to John VII, Duke of Mecklenburg-Schwerin.
3. Philip (10 August 1570 – 18 October 1590).
4. Christina (13 April 1573 – 8 December 1625), married on 27 August 1592 to King Charles IX of Sweden.
5. John Adolph (27 February 1575 – 31 March 1616).
6. Anna (27 February 1575 – 24 April 1610), married 28 January 1598 to Count Enno III of Ostfriesland.
7. Christian, died young in 1577.
8. Agnes (20 December 1578 – 1627).
9. John Frederick, prince-bishop of Bremen, Lübeck and Verden, (1 September 1579 – 3 September 1634).

Through her daughters Sophia and Anna, she is an ancestor of British Monarch Charles III.

== Ancestors ==
Ancestors of Christine of Hesse

16. Louis I, Landgrave of Hesse
8. Louis II, Landgrave of Hesse
17. Anna of Saxony
4. William II, Landgrave of Hesse
18. Ludwig I, Count of Württemberg-Urach
9. Matilda of Württemberg-Urach
19. Mechthild of the Palatinate
2. Philip I, Landgrave of Hesse
20. Henry IV, Duke of Mecklenburg
10. Magnus II, Duke of Mecklenburg-Schwerin and Güstrow
21. Dorothea of Brandenburg
5. Anna of Mecklenburg-Schwerin
22. Eric II, Duke of Pomerania
11. Sophie of Pomerania-Wolgast
23. Sophia of Pomerania-Stolp
1. Christine of Hesse
24. Frederick II, Elector of Saxony
12. Albert III, Duke of Saxony
25. Margarete of Austria
6. George, Duke of Saxony
26. George of Poděbrady
13. Sidonie of Poděbrady
27. Kunigunde of Sternberg
3. Christine of Saxony
28. Władysław II Jagiełło
14. Casimir IV Jagiellon
29. Sophia of Halshany
7. Barbara Jagiellon
30. Albert II of Germany
15. Elisabeth of Austria
31. Elizabeth of Luxembourg

Christine of Hesse House of Hesse Born: 29 June 1543 Died: 13 May 1604
Royal titles
New title	Duchess consort of Holstein-Gottorp; 1564–1586	Succeeded by Augusta of Denmark
