= Philip, Duke of Holstein-Gottorp =

Philip
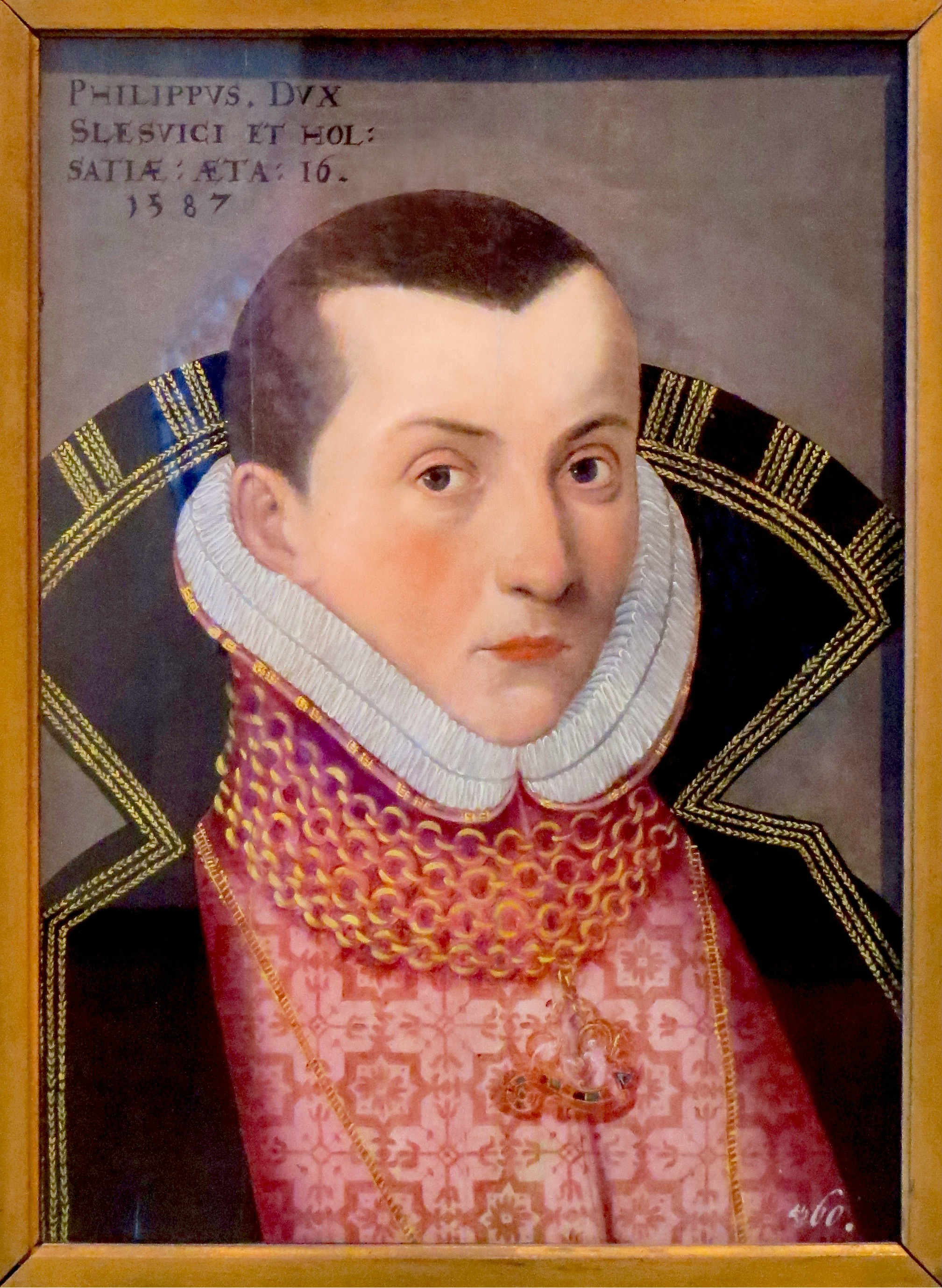

Duke of Holstein-Gottorp
- Reign: 15 June 1587 – 18 October 1590
- Predecessor: Frederick II
- Successor: John Adolf
- Born: 10 August 1570
- Died: 18 October 1590 (aged 20)
- House: Holstein-Gottorp
- Father: Adolf, Duke of Holstein-Gottorp
- Mother: Christine of Hesse

Philip, Duke of Holstein-Gottorp (10 August 1570 – 18 October 1590) was the second son of Adolf, Duke of Holstein-Gottorp (1526–1586) and his wife, Christine of Hesse (1543–1604).

After the early death of his elder brother Frederick II in 1587, he inherited the ducal share of rule in the royal Danish-ducal condominium of the duchies of Holstein and of Schleswig at the age of 17. He died three years later. Not much is known about his death but he might have died of natural causes . Rumours say that his brother Frederick was also close to him.

== Ancestors ==
Ancestors of Philip, Duke of Holstein-Gottorp

16. Dietrich, Count of Oldenburg
8. Christian I of Denmark
17. Hedvig of Holstein
4. Frederick I of Denmark
18. John, Margrave of Brandenburg-Kulmbach
9. Dorothea of Brandenburg
19. Barbara of Saxe-Wittenberg
2. Adolf, Duke of Holstein-Gottorp
20. Eric II, Duke of Pomerania
10. Bogislaw X, Duke of Pomerania
21. Sophia of Pomerania-Stolp
5. Sophie of Pomerania
22. Casimir IV Jagiellon
11. Anna Jagiellon
23. Elizabeth of Austria
1. Philip, Duke of Holstein-Gottorp
24. Louis II, Landgrave of Lower Hesse
12. William II, Landgrave of Hesse
25. Mechthild of Württemberg-Urach
6. Philip I, Landgrave of Hesse
26. Magnus II, Duke of Mecklenburg
13. Anna of Mecklenburg-Schwerin
27. Sophie of Pomerania-Stettin
3. Christine of Hesse
28. Albert III, Duke of Saxony
14. George, Duke of Saxony
29. Sidonie Podiebrad
7. Christine of Saxony
30. Casimir IV Jagiellon (= 22)
15. Barbara Jagiellon
31. Elizabeth of Austria (= 23)

Philip, Duke of Holstein-Gottorp House of Holstein-Gottorp Cadet branch of the House of Oldenburg Born: 10 August 1570 Died: 18 October 1590
Regnal titles
Preceded by Frederick II (Gottorp) and Frederick II (Denmark)	Duke of Holstein and Schleswig; 1587–1590 with Frederick II of Denmark (1587–1588); Christian IV of Denmark (1588–1590)	Succeeded by Christian IV and John Adolf
