= Adolf, Duke of Holstein-Gottorp =

16th Century Duke of Holstein-Gottorp

Adolf of Denmark
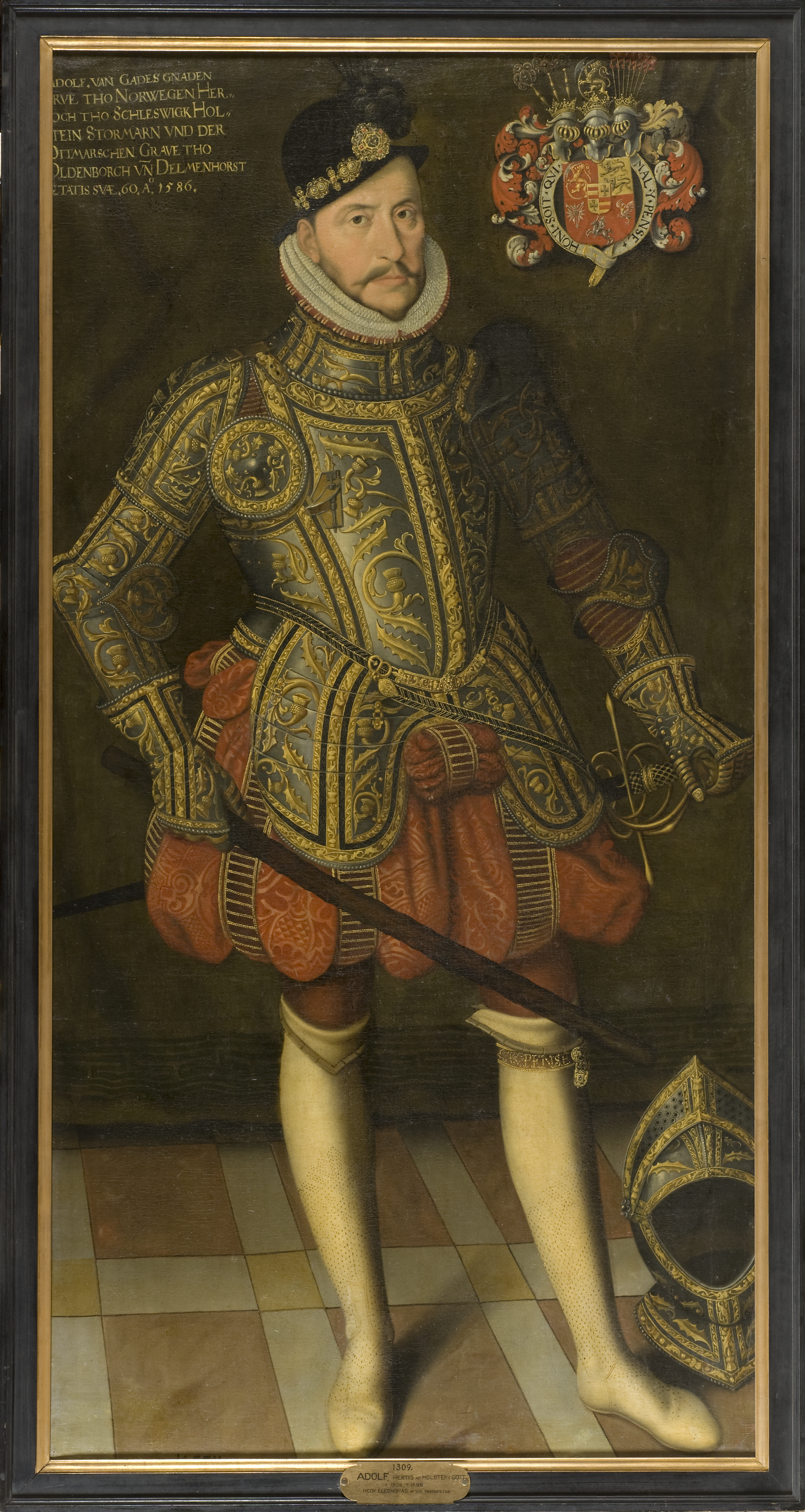
- Duke Adolf in cuirass, painting by an unknown author, 1586.

Duke of Holstein-Gottorp
- Reign: 1544–1586
- Predecessor: Christian III of Denmark
- Successor: Frederick II of Holstein-Gottorp; Frederick II of Denmark and Norway
- Born: 25 January 1526
- Died: 1 October 1586 (aged 60)
- Spouse: Christine of Hesse (m. 1564)
- Issue: Frederick II, Duke of Holstein-Gottorp; Sophia, Duchess of Mecklenburg; Philip, Duke of Holstein-Gottorp; Christine, Queen of Sweden; Elisabeth; Johann Adolf, Duke of Holstein-Gottorp; Anna, Countess of East Frisia; Bishop John Frederick
- Father: Frederick I of Denmark
- Mother: Sophie of Pomerania

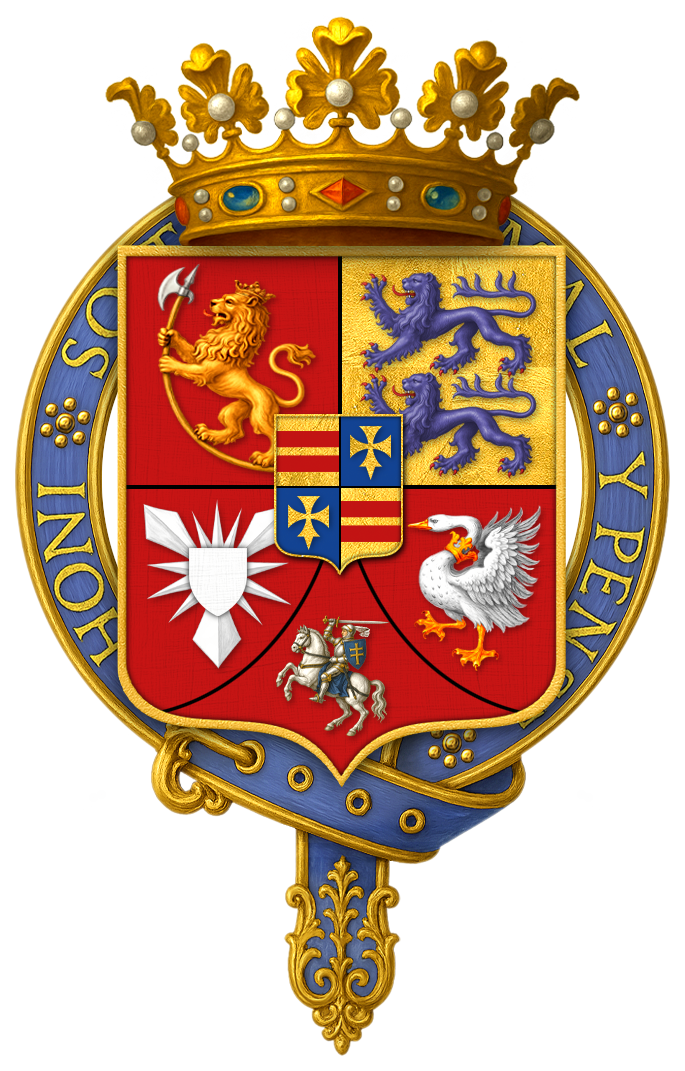
Garter-encircled Arms of Adolf, Duke of Holstein-Gottorp, KG

Adolf of Denmark or Adolf of Holstein-Gottorp (25 January 1526 –1 October 1586) was the first Duke of Holstein-Gottorp from the line of Holstein-Gottorp of the House of Oldenburg.

He was the third son of King Frederick I of Denmark and his second wife, Sophie of Pomerania. King Frederick I had his son educated by Philip I, Landgrave of Hesse. He spent four years at the Landgrave's castle in Kassel.

In 1544, Adolf, his brother Johann, and their half-brother King Christian III of Denmark, divided the duchies of Schleswig and Holstein. The areas were divided according to approximately equal tax proceeds. Adolf, as the youngest, was entitled to the first choice. Since he selected the part with the castle Gottorp, the line of the house Oldenburg created by him was called Schleswig-Holstein-Gottorp.

== Partition of Holstein and Schleswig ==
Until the Treaty of Speyer, concluded on 23 May 1544, Adolf's half-brother Christian III of Denmark ruled the entire Duchies of Holstein and Schleswig in the name of the then still minor Adolf and his brother John the Elder (Hans den Ældre). They determined their youngest brother Frederick was to have a career as Lutheran administrator. In 1551 Frederick became administrator of the Prince-Bishopric of Hildesheim.

In 1544, following negotiations between the elder three brothers and the nobility of the duchies, the brothers decided to partition the duchies of Holstein and Schleswig between themselves. The revenues of the duchies were divided into three equal shares by assigning the revenues of particular areas and landed estates to each of the elder brothers. Other general revenues, such as taxes from towns and customs duties, were levied together and then shared among the brothers.

The secular rule in the fiscally divided duchies was shared between the brothers. As dukes of Holstein and Schleswig the three brothers bore the formal title of "Duke of Schleswig, Holstein, Ditmarsh and Stormarn". Adolf founded a cadet branch of the royal Danish House of Oldenburg called the House of Holstein-Gottorp.

John the Elder, the Duke of Schleswig-Holstein-Haderslev, produced no issue, so no branch emerged from his side. After his death in 1580, Adolf and his nephew Frederick II of Denmark halved John's share among themselves.

Adolf travelled, entrusting Johan Rantzau to manage his country. Adolf participated in the Diet of Augsburg where he witnessed Emperor Charles V at the high point of his power. In 1553 Adolf returned to his homeland. In 1556 Adolf succeeded his younger brother Frederick as Bishop of Schleswig.

== Family and children ==
On 17 December 1564 he married Christine, daughter of Philip I, Landgrave of Hesse, and had the following children:

1. Frederick II (21 April 1568 – 15 June 1587).
2. Sophia (1 June 1569 – 14 November 1634), married on 17 February 1588 to John VII of Mecklenburg-Schwerin.
3. Philip (10 August 1570 – 18 October 1590).
4. Christina (13 April 1573 – 8 December 1625), married on 27 August 1592 to King Charles IX of Sweden.
5. Elisabeth (11 March 1574 – 13 January 1587)
6. John Adolph (27 February 1575 – 31 March 1616), prince-bishop of Bremen, Lübeck, later duke of Holstein and duke of Schleswig.
7. Anna (27 February 1575 – 24 April 1625), married 28 January 1598 to Count Enno III of Ostfriesland.
8. Christian (29 May 1576 – 22 April 1577)
9. Agnes (20 December 1578 – 19 August 1627).
10. John Frederick (1 September 1579 – 3 September 1634), prince-bishop of Bremen, Lübeck and Verden.

== In fiction ==
Duke Adolf is a character in Stefan Heym's 1981 book Ahasver (published in English as The Wandering Jew). Heym's depiction of the Duke is highly satyrical and unflattering. The Duke is shown in the midst of a night of lechery and drunkenness, charging Paul von Eitzen, Superintendent of the Lutheran church of the Gottorp share of Holstein and Schleswig, with creating "The Kingdom of God" in his duchy — i.e., imposing the newly minted Lutheran orthodoxy and persecuting "heretics" such as the Mennonites. At the same time the Duke, out of political expediency, also sends troops to help the efforts of the zealously Catholic Philip II of Spain to stamp out the Dutch Revolt conducted by the Duke's fellow Protestants.

== Notes ==
Adolf of Schleswig-Holstein-Gottorp House of Holstein-Gottorp Cadet branch of the House of Oldenburg Born: 25 January 1526 Died: 1 October 1586
Regnal titles
Preceded by Christian III	Duke of Holstein and Schleswig; 1544–1586 with John the Elder (1544-1580); Christian III (1544-1559); Frederick II (1559-1586)	Succeeded by Frederick II (Gottorp) and Frederick II (Denmark)
Titles in Lutheranism
Preceded by Frederick of Denmark	Lutheran bishop of Schleswig assisted by Superintendent Paul von Eitzen (since 1562); 1556–1586	Vacant Title next held by Ulrik of Denmark
