= Sophie of Pomerania =

Queen of Denmark (1523–1533) and Norway (1524–1533)

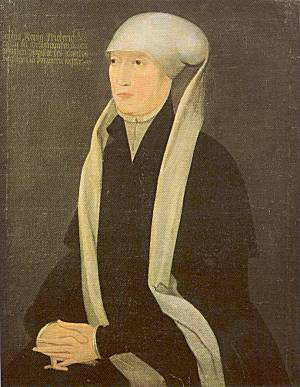
- 16th-century portrait

Queen consort of Denmark
- Tenure: 1523–1533
- Coronation: 13 August 1525

Queen consort of Norway
- Tenure: 1524–1533
- Born: c. 1498; Stettin (Szczecin)
- Died: 13 May 1568 (aged 69–70); Kiel
- Burial: Schleswig Cathedral
- Spouse: Frederick I of Denmark (m. 1518; died 1533)
- Issue: John II, Duke of Schleswig-Holstein-Haderslev; Elizabeth, Duchess of Mecklenburg; Adolf, Duke of Holstein-Gottorp; Anne; Dorothea, Duchess of Mecklenburg; Frederick, Bishop of Hildesheim and Schleswig
- House: House of Griffin
- Father: Bogislaw X, Duke of Pomerania
- Mother: Anna Jagiellon

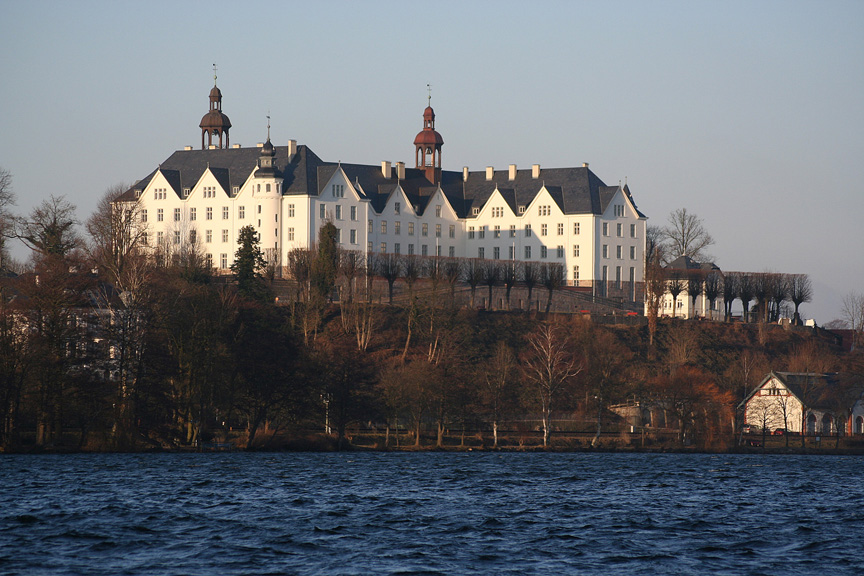
Plön Castle after its renovation in 2006; from the southwest with the Großer Plöner See in the foreground. The Kiel–Lübeck railway runs along its banks.

Sophie of Pomerania (1498 – 13 May 1568) was Queen of Denmark and Norway as the second wife of Frederick I. She is known for her independent rule over her fiefs Lolland and Falster, the castles in Kiel and Plön, and several villages in Holstein as queen.

== Life ==
Born in Stettin (Szczecin) into the House of Pomerania, she was the daughter of Bogislaw X, Duke of Pomerania and the Polish princess Anna Jagiellon.

In the autumn of1503 a rebellion broke out in Stettin and Bogislaw moved his family to safety, first to Gartz and then to Ueckermünde castle. Anna who was pregnant grew sick on their arrival and gave birth to a son before dying on August 12, 1503.

Modern historians, based on reports of chronicler Joachim von Wedel, speculated that the cause of her death could be pneumonia or tuberculosis.

After the death of his first spouse Anna of Brandenburg in 1514, she married the future Frederick I of Denmark. Not much is known about her personality. She is not known to have played any political role. She is thought to have been interested in religion: a German psalm, "Gott ist mein Heil, mein Hülf und Trost", is believed to have been written by her.

Sophie became queen consort of Denmark and Norway upon the ascension of her spouse to the throne of Denmark in 1523 and Norway in 1524. She was crowned Queen of Denmark on 13 August 1525 (but never crowned Queen of Norway).

At her coronation, she was granted Lolland and Falster, the castles in Kiel and Plön, and several villages in Holstein for her income. In 1526, Anne Meinstrup was appointed head lady-in-waiting for her court. Queen Sophie did not live at the Danish court as queen, but resided separated from her spouse on her property in Kiel, and treated her estates as her private independent fiefs, which caused disagreements with her spouse during his reign. The conflicts continued during the reign of his successors and until her death.

In 1533, she became a widow and moved to Gottorp Castle with her children, awaiting the outcome of the election of the new king. During the Count's Feud 1533–36, her estates was occupied. In 1538, her stepson, the new king, Christian III, asked her to leave Gottorp because of the costs and reside in Kiel. She demanded the right to rule independently over her fiefs, but was in 1540 forced to accept the superiority of the king.

== Issue ==
She had six children:

1. Duke John of Holstein-Haderslev (28 June 1521 – 2 October 1580)
2. Elizabeth (14 October 1524 – 15 October 1586), married:
  1. on 26 August 1543 to Duke Magnus III of Mecklenburg-Schwerin
  2. on 14 February 1556 to Ulrich, Duke of Mecklenburg
3. Adolf, Duke of Holstein-Gottorp (25 January 1526 – 1 October 1586)
4. Anne (1527 – 4 June 1535)
5. Dorothea (1528 – 11 November 1575), married on 27 October 1573 to Duke Christof of Mecklenburg-Schwerin.
6. Frederick, Bishop of Hildesheim and Schleswig (13 April 1532 – 27 October 1556).

== Ancestry ==
Ancestors of Sophie of Pomerania

16. Barnim VI, Duke of Pomerania (1365–1405)
8. Wartislaw IX, Duke of Pomerania (1400–1457)
17. Veronica of Hohenzollern
4. Eric II, Duke of Pomerania (1418/25–1474)
18. Eric IV, Duke of Saxe-Lauenburg (1354–1411)
9. Sophia of Saxe-Lauenburg (1395–1462)
19. Sophia of Brunswick-Lüneburg (1358–1416)
2. Bogislaw X, Duke of Pomerania (1454–1523)
20. Bogislaw VIII, Duke of Pomerania (1364–1418)
10. Bogislaw IX, Duke of Pomerania (1407/10–1446)
21. Sophie of Holstein (d. aft. 1451)
5. Sophie of Pomerania (1435–1494/97)
22. Siemowit IV, Duke of Masovia (1353/56–1426)
11. Maria of Masovia (1410–1454)
23. Alexandra of Lithuania (d. 1434)
1. Sophie of Pomerania (1498–1568)
24. Algirdas (1296–1377)
12. Jogaila (1362–1434)
25. Uliana of Tver (1325–1392)
6. Casimir IV Jagiellon (1427–1492)
26. Andrew of Halshany (1365–1410)
13. Sophia of Halshany (1405–1461)
27. Alexandra Drucka (1380–1426)
3. Anna Jagiellon (1476–1503)
28. Albert IV, Duke of Austria (1377–1404)
14. Albert II of Germany (1397–1439)
29. Joanna Sophia of Bavaria (1373–1410)
7. Elisabeth of Austria (1435–1505)
30. Sigismund, Holy Roman Emperor (1368–1437)
15. Elizabeth of Luxembourg (1409–1442)
31. Barbara of Cilli (1390–1451)

== Literature ==
- Politikens bog om Danske monarker, af Benito Scocozza, 1997
- Danske dronninger i tusind år, af Steffen Heiberg, 2000

Sophie of Pomerania House of Griffins (Pomerania) Born: circa 1498 Died: 13 May 1568
Danish royalty
Preceded by Isabella of Austria	Queen consort of Denmark; 1523–1533	Succeeded by Dorothea of Saxe-Lauenburg
Vacant Title last held by Isabella of Austria	Queen consort of Norway; 1524–1533	Vacant Title next held by Dorothea of Saxe-Lauenburg
