= Gottorf Castle =

Castle in Germany

Coordinates: 54°30′42″N 9°32′29″E

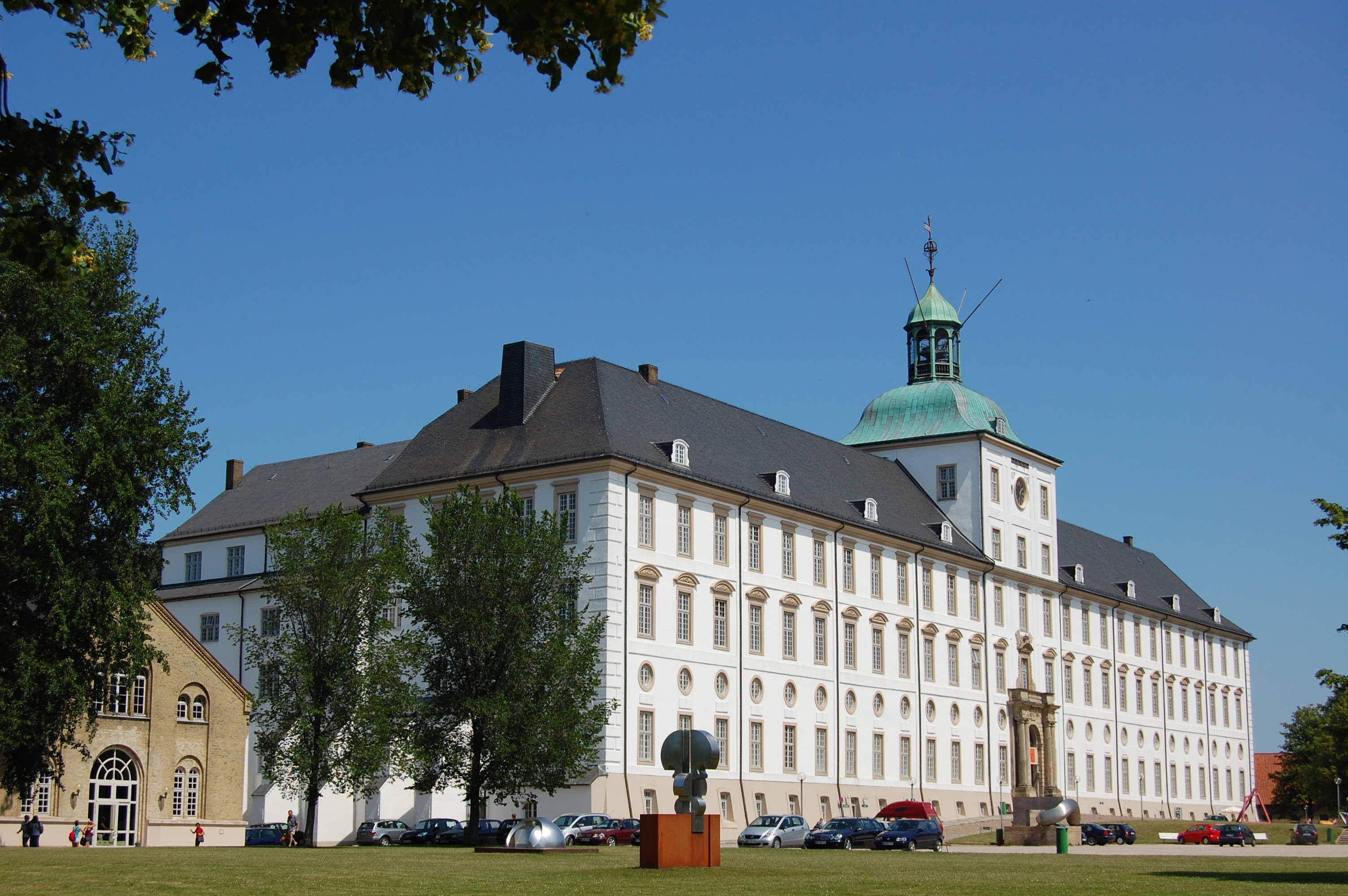
Gottorf castle: View of the southern wing

Gottorf Castle (German: Schloss Gottorf, Danish: Gottorp Slot, Low German: Slott Gottorp) is a castle and estate in the city of Schleswig, Schleswig-Holstein, Germany. It is one of the most important secular buildings in Schleswig-Holstein, and has been rebuilt and expanded several times in its over eight hundred years of history, changing from a medieval castle to a Renaissance fortress to a Baroque palace.

It is the ancestral home of the Holstein-Gottorp branch of the House of Oldenburg, from which emerged in the 18th century, among other things, four Swedish kings and several Russian Emperors. It is situated on an island in the Schlei, about 40 km from the Baltic Sea.

== History ==
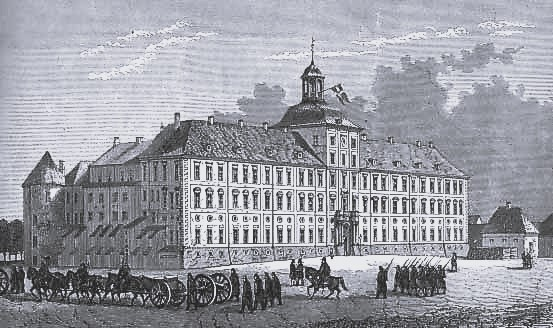
Gottorf castle in 1864

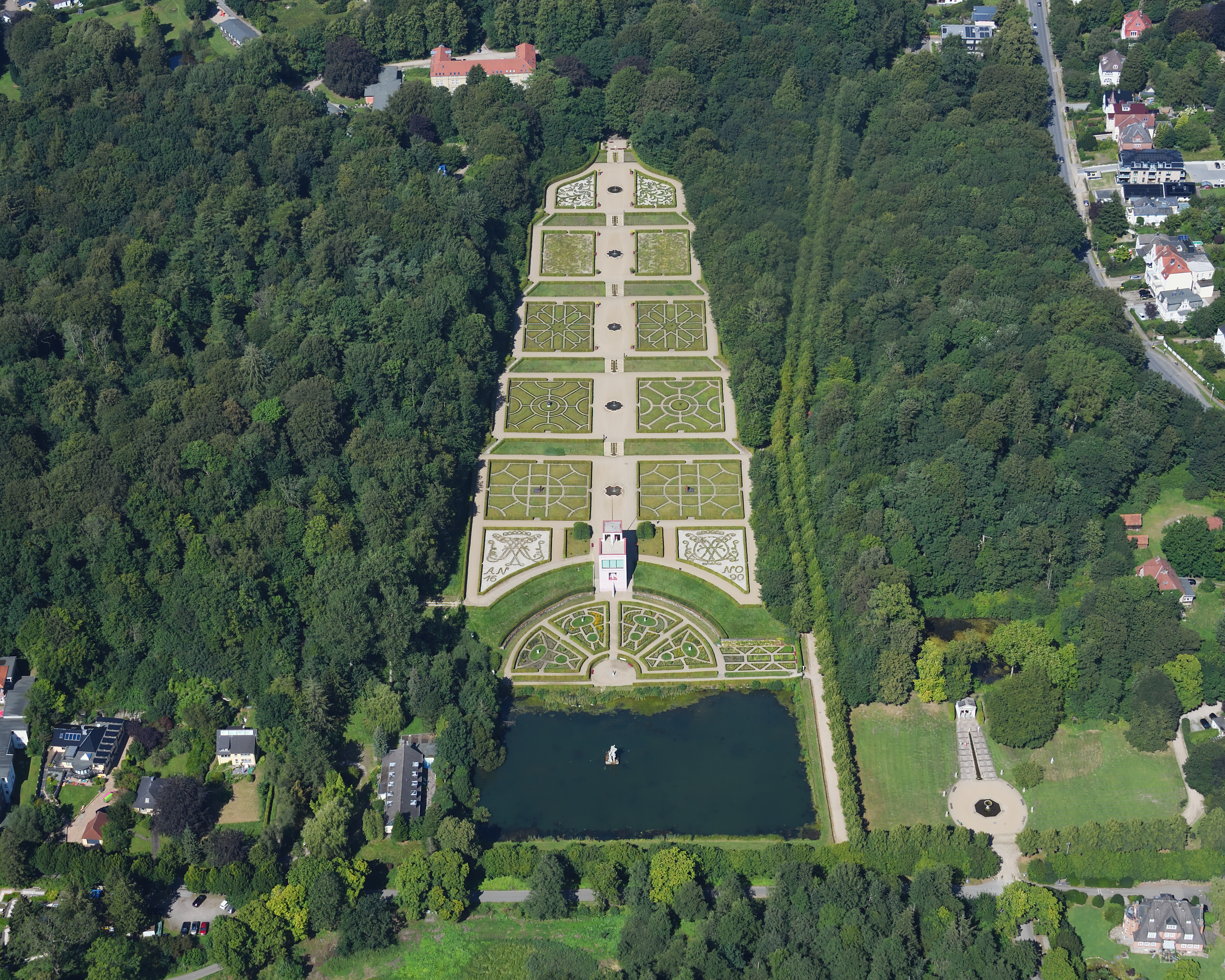
Aerial view of the Neuwerk garden

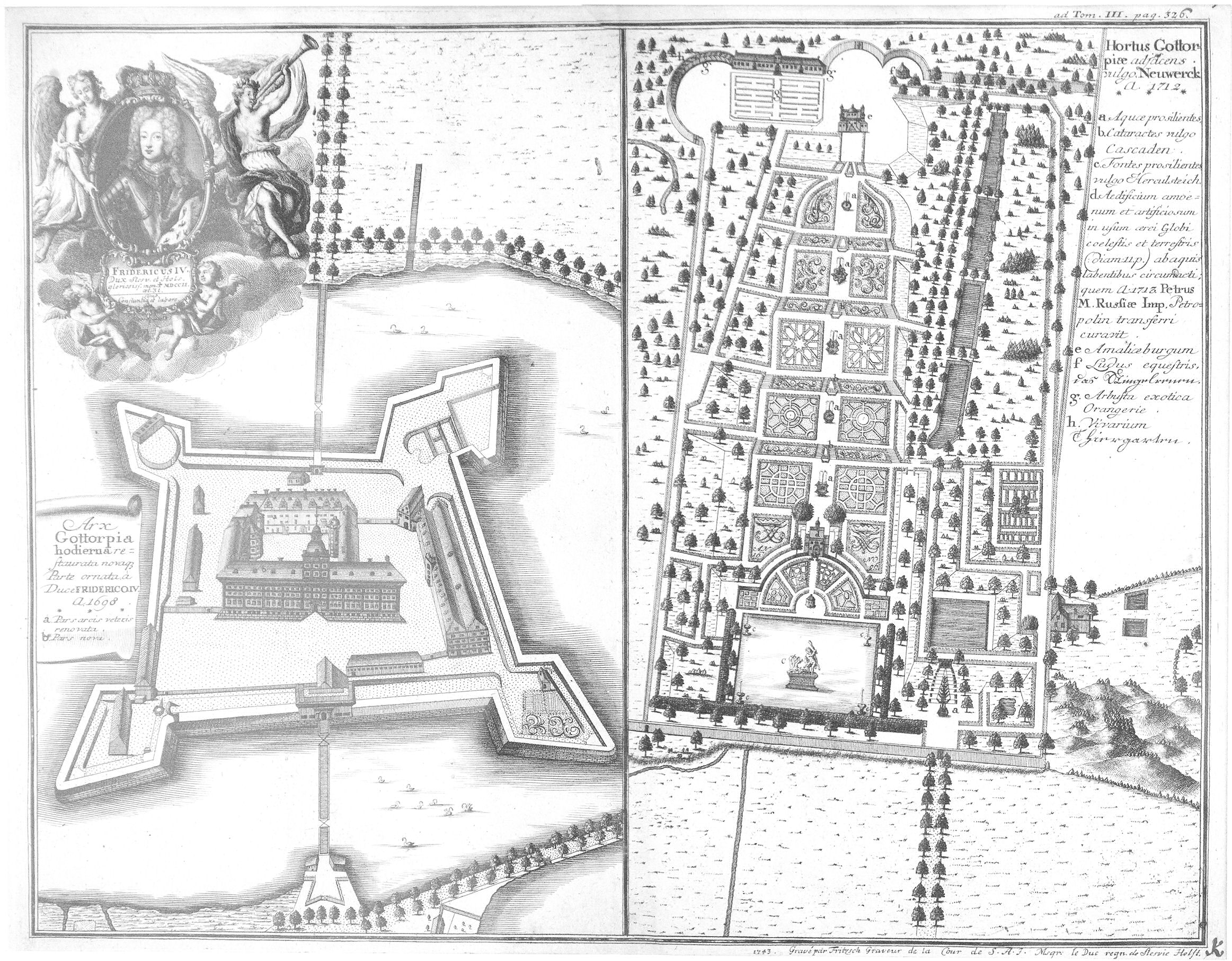
Plan of the Neuwerk garden and the "Schlossinsel", Etching 1743

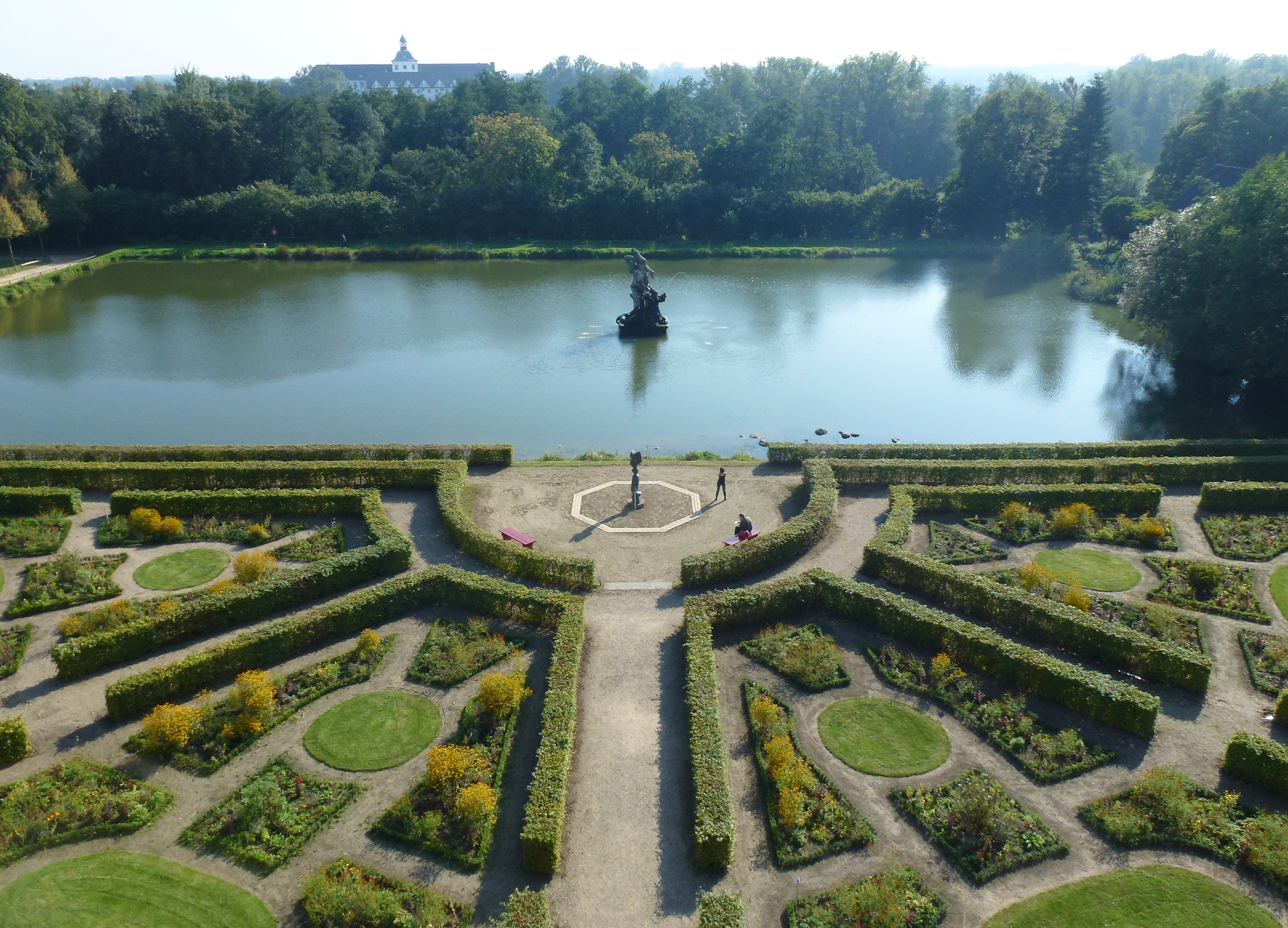
View from the globe house to the south, pond, figure of Herkules and southern garden terrace

It was first settled as an estate in 1161 as the residence of Bishop Occo of Schleswig when his former residence was destroyed. The Danish Duke of Schleswig acquired it through a purchase in 1268, and in 1340 it was transferred to the Count of Holstein at Rendsburg of the House of Schauenburg. The manor later, through maternal inheritance, became the possession of Christian I of Denmark, the first Danish monarch from the House of Oldenburg, in 1459.

Both the island and the structure were extended through the years, and particularly during the 16th century. Frederick I, younger son of Christian I, made it his primary residence. In 1544 the duchies of Schleswig and Holstein were divided in three parts; Frederick's third son Adolf received one of these parts and made his residence at Gottorp. This state became known as the Duchy of Schleswig-Holstein-Gottorp.

The estate became a European cultural centre during the 1616–1659 reign of Frederick III, Duke of Holstein-Gottorp. The castle was built between 1697 and 1703 by the famous Swedish architect Nicodemus Tessin the Younger.

After the ducal lineage of Gottorp were forced to move out in 1702, the palace, now occupied by the Danish, fell into disuse and disrepair in 1713 under the reign of Frederick IV of Denmark. Pieces of furniture, art and other interior were gradually moved out of the palace, and the structures were used both as Danish and Prussian barracks in the 19th century.

During World War II, the estate was used as a displaced persons camp.

Since 1947, the palace has been renovated and restored through a series of initiatives. The restoration was considered complete in 1996. The palace is now owned by a foundation of the State of Schleswig-Holstein and houses the State Art and Cultural History Museum and the State Archeological Museum.

== See also ==
- List of Baroque residences
- Globe of Gottorf
- Castle in front of Husum
