= Babette =

Babette may refer to:

- Babette (given name), a feminine name
- Babette (card game), a type of solitaire
- Babette (clothing line), by baboon an Australian Fashion Brand
- Babette (film), a 1917 silent film
- USS Babette II (SP-484), a US Navy patrol vessel in commission from 1917 to 1919
- 8344 Babette, an asteroid
- Babette, first boat design of William J. Roué

== See also ==
- Babette's, a supper club in Atlantic City, New Jersey
- Babette's Feast, a Danish film based on a story by Karen Blixen
- Babet (disambiguation)
