= Vilhelmina Gyldenstolpe =

Swedish court official (1779–1858)

Vilhelmina Gyldenstolpe, née De Geer (16 December 1779, Stockholm-31 December 1858, Stockholm), was a Swedish court official. She served as överhovmästarinna (Senior lady-in-waiting) to the queen and later queen dowager of Sweden, Désirée Clary, from 1829 to 1858.

== Life ==
She was the daughter of courtier baron Charles De Geer (1747–1805) and Eleonora Vilhelmina von Höpken. She was thus the sister of Carl De Geer (1781–1861) and sister-in-law of Hans Henric von Essen. She married the courtier count Carl Edvard Gyldenstolpe (1770-1852) in 1798, with whom she had eight children. Her spouse had previously been engaged to Lolotte Forssberg, the alleged daughter of her father's first wife Ulla von Liewen and Adolf Frederick, King of Sweden.

In 1823, she was appointed statsfru to the newly formed household of the queen, and was in 1829 promoted to the office of överhovmästarinna or senior lady-in-waiting.

King Charles XIV John of Sweden had abolished a number of court customs prior to the arrival of the queen in 1823 in order to make court life less formal, such as public dining and the kissing of the queen's skirt during court presentations, but while he left many of the offices of his own court vacant, he still appointed a full court to the queen. Further more, while the king himself often loosened the etiquette in his own appearances, Gyldenstolpe seems to have upheld a strict conservative etiquette at the court of the queen; at one occasion during a journey, Vilhelmina Gyldenstolpe announced that while the king planned to greet also people normally not received at court because of their rank, such a thing could of course be unthinkable for the queen.

Queen Désirée compared her unfavorably to the senior lady-in-waiting of her daughter-in-law Josephine of Leuchtenberg in a letter to her sister Julie Clary in March 1831:

"I am sure you have found countess Piper to be very pleasant and entertaining; she is an exceptional person [un phénix]. Joséphine is lucky to be given her as a dame d'honneur, my own is an icicle!"

Court offices
| Preceded by Marcelle Tascher de la Pagerie | Överhovmästarinna to the Queen of Sweden; 1829–1844 | Succeeded by Charlotta Skjöldebrand |
