= Jean-Baptiste de Boyer, Marquis d'Argens =

French philosopher and writer (1704–1771)

Jean-Baptiste de Boyer Marquis d'Argens
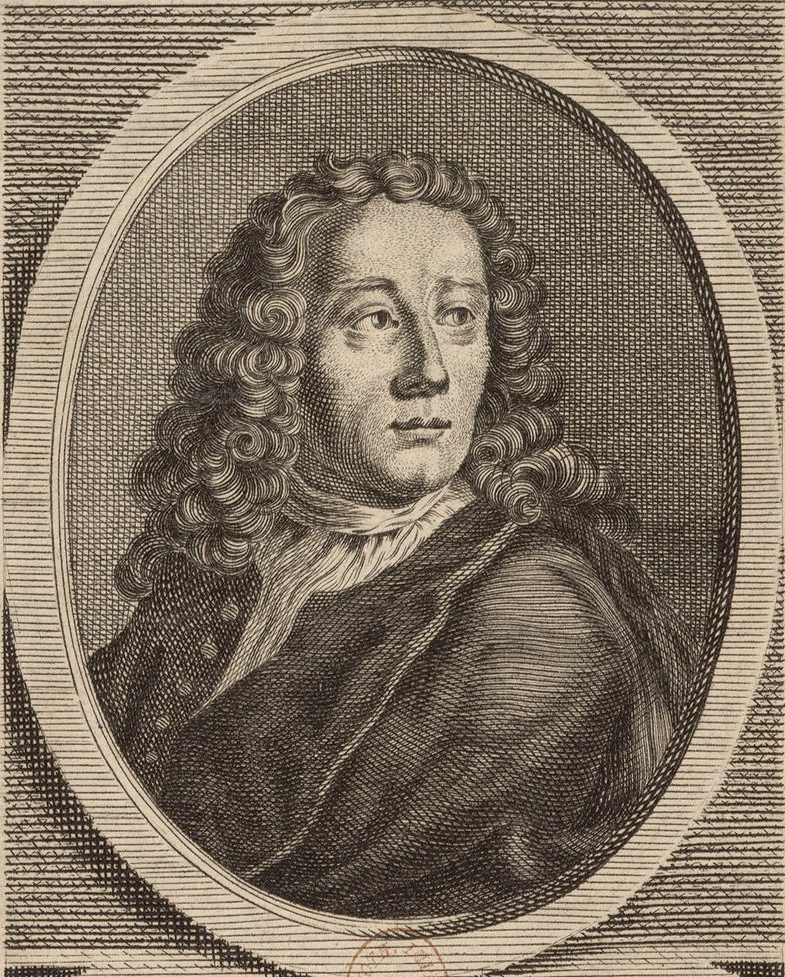
- Portrait by Jakob van der Schley, 1738
- Born: 24 June 1704; Aix-en-Provence, France
- Died: 11 January 1771 (aged 66); Château de La Garde, Toulon, France
- Occupations: Philosopher; author

Philosophical work
- Era: Age of Enlightenment
- Region: French philosophy
- School: Rationalism; Epicureanism; Pelagianism
- Main interests: Political philosophy; literature; historiography; biblical criticism
- Notable ideas: Toleration; freedom of religion; freedom of speech; separation of church and state

Jean-Baptiste de Boyer, Marquis d'Argens (24 June 1704 – 11 January 1771) was a French rationalist, author and critic of the Catholic Church, who was a close friend of Voltaire and spent much of his life in exile at the court of Frederick the Great.

== Life ==
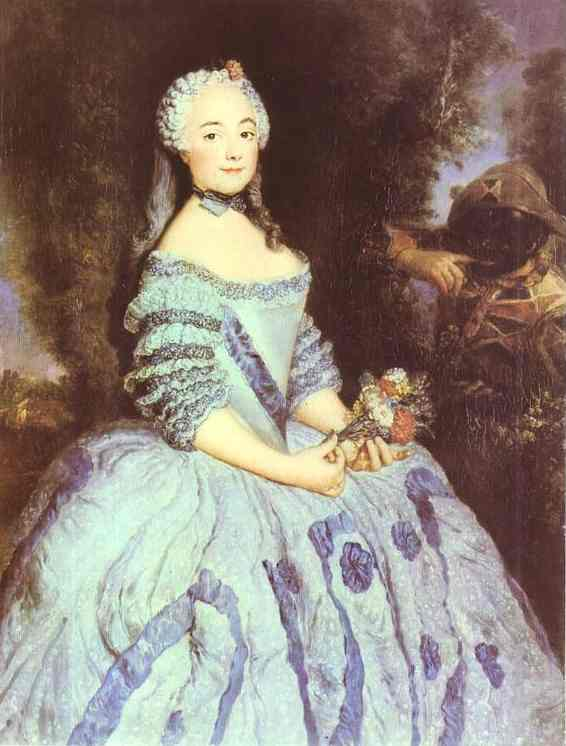
Babette Cochois (1725–1780), whom Jean-Baptiste married in 1749

Jean-Baptiste de Boyer, later Marquis d’Argens, was born on 24 June 1704 in the southern French town of Aix-en-Provence. He was the eldest of seven children of Pierre-Jean de Boyer and Angélique de L'Enfant, daughter of Luc de L'Enfant (1656–1729), President of the Regional Parliament.

Pierre-Jean de Boyer was Procureur général or Attorney-General for the Regional Parliament of Provence and a member of the Second Estate, the Noblesse de robe or Nobles of the robe. Their rank derived from the possession of judicial or administrative posts and unlike the aristocratic Noblesse d'épée or Nobles of the Sword, they were often hard-working middle-class professionals.

By the mid-18th century, many of these positions had become hereditary, with eldest sons expected to succeed their fathers, marry and have children. Jean-Baptiste rejected a legal career and while the rest of his family were devout Catholics, became a rationalist author and critic of the Church; he later wrote 'I was not my father's favourite child.'

To prevent the division of family estates amongst multiple heirs, younger sons were often required to remain unmarried; of his four younger brothers, three including Alexandre, later Marquis D'Éguilles were enrolled in the Knights of Malta religious order and the other became a priest. His refusal to conform meant he was disinherited in favour of his younger brother Alexandre in 1734 but despite their philosophical differences, the two remained close friends throughout their lives.

In 1749, he married French ballerina and writer Babette Cochois (1725–1780), with whom he had a daughter, Barbe (1754–1814). After many years living in Berlin, he returned to France in 1769, where he died at the Château de La Garde on 11 January 1771; originally buried in Toulon Cathedral, his remains were later moved into the family vault at Le Couvent des Minimes.

== Career ==
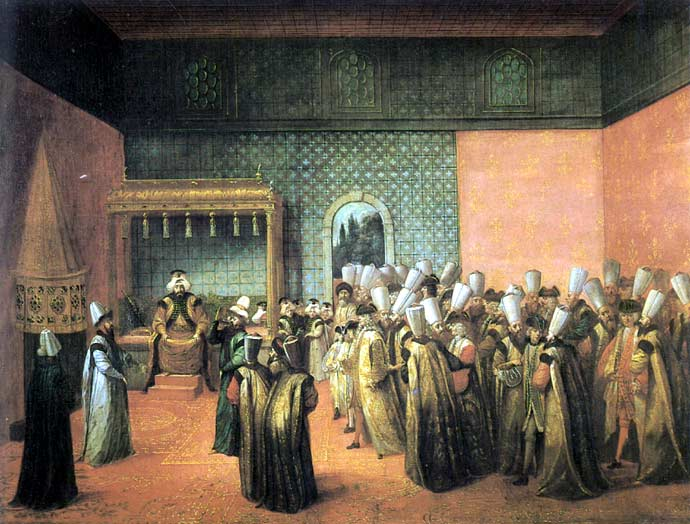
Vicomte d'Andrezel, presenting his credentials as Ambassador to Sultan Ahmed III, October 1724

While several generations of the de Boyer family held the position of Procureur général, they also had a background in the arts. Jean-Baptiste's great-uncle was the poet and dramatist Abbe Claude de Boyer (1618–1698), while his grandfather, Jean-Baptiste de Boyer (1640–1709), owned a famous art collection, with works by Titian, Caravaggio, Michelangelo, Van Dyck, Poussin, Rubens and Corregio.

In 1719, his father reluctantly purchased Jean-Baptiste a commission in the Régiment de Toulouse, based in Strasbourg. Pierre-Jean de Boyer was made 'Marquis d'Argens' in 1722 and since eldest sons were permitted to use the same title, Jean-Baptiste was also known as Marquis d'Argens. In 1722, he eloped with an actress and fled to Spain, before being taken back to France under military escort. One of his warders was Vicomte d'Andrezel, shortly to become French ambassador in Constantinople; he persuaded Pierre-Jean de Boyer to allow his son to accompany him and they left Toulon at the end of 1723.

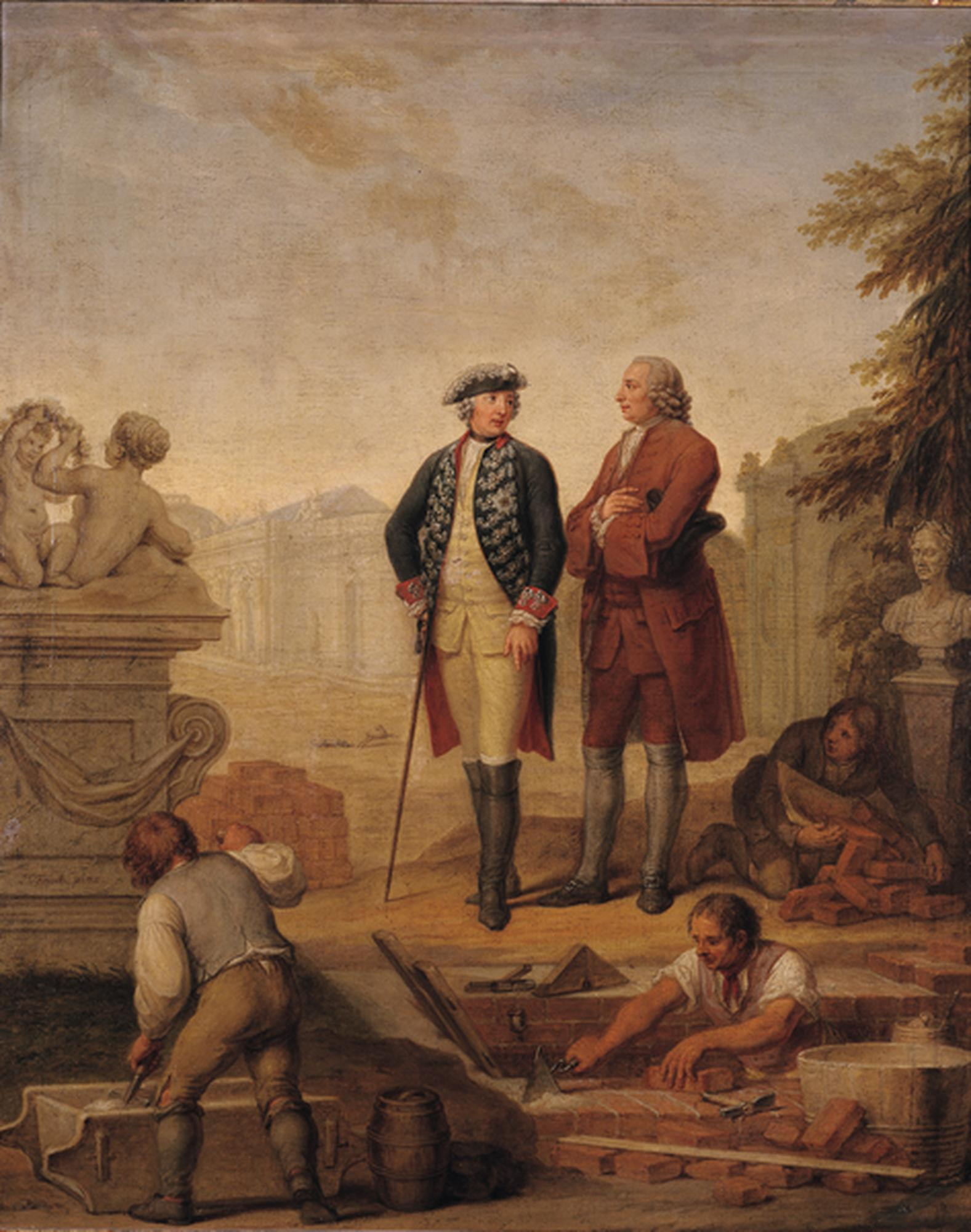
The Marquis d'Argens (on right) with Frederick the Great at Sanssouci

D'Argens returned to France in 1724, where he spent the next few years obediently studying law and even acting in a number of legal cases. The 1731 Cadière witchcraft trial appears to have been the point at which he rejected a legal career, while confirming his opposition to the Catholic Church and the Jesuits in particular. He rejoined the army in 1733 during the War of the Polish Succession, serving in the same regiment as his younger brother Luc de Boyer (1713–1772). Wounded at Kehl, he was badly injured in a fall from his horse in 1734, which ended his military career.

He was now formally disinherited and moved to the Netherlands, where he began his career as a writer, publishing Mémoires de Monsieur le Marquis d'Argens in 1735. This was followed by Lettres juives, issued in six volumes between 1736 and 1740; employing the format used by Montesquieu in his 1721 work Persian Letters, this was an immediate success but provoked criticism from Catholic writers such as de La Martinière. After spells in Port Mahón, Menorca and Stuttgart, in 1742 he accepted an offer from Frederick the Great as Royal Chamberlain in Berlin, where he spent most of his career. He was also appointed Director of the Belles-Lettres section of the Prussian Academy of Arts and of the Berlin State Opera; it was while visiting Paris to recruit performers that he met Babette Cochois, whom he married in 1749.

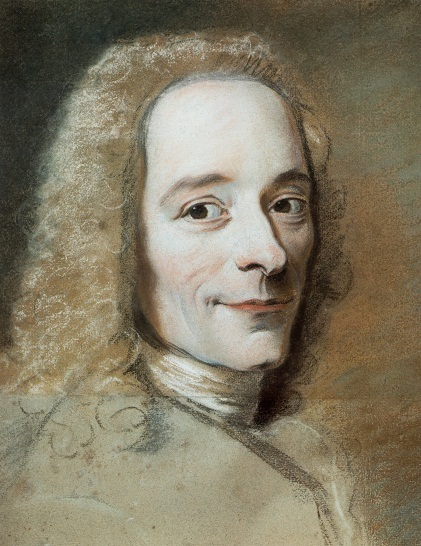
Voltaire, close friend and associate of d'Argens for 30 years

After his brothers Luc and Alexandre intervened with their father, d'Argens was reconciled with his family in 1738 and thereafter paid an allowance of £5,000 per annum, a considerable sum at the time; he was also allowed to use the family home in Provence, where he often spent the winter months. In 1763, Alexandre, who succeeded their father as Marquis d'Éguilles in 1757, was banished from France and joined his brother in Berlin; as Voltaire observed, one brother was exiled for opposing the Jesuits, the other for supporting them. After returning to France in 1768, Alexandre offered to reverse the 1734 legal order disinheriting his brother, an offer that was refused. D'Argens left Berlin for the last time in 1769 and returned to Provence; he died on 11 January 1771 while visiting his sister at the Château de La Garde near Toulon.

== Works ==
D'Argens was part of the mid-18th-century Enlightenment movement in France, led by Voltaire, Jean-Jacques Rousseau and Montesquieu, who argued for a society based on reason, and the separation of church and state. However, they were not revolutionaries; many were members of the nobility who opposed absolute monarchy, not monarchy itself, a major divergence between the Marquis d'Argens and liberal Protestants like Prosper Marchand.

Besides Lettres juives, his major works include Lettres chinoises, Lettres cabalistiques and Mémoires secrets de la république des lettres, later revised and augmented as Histoire de l'esprit humain. He also wrote six novels, the best known being Thérèse philosophe, which was based on the events of the Cadière trial. However, the book was published anonymously, D'Argens himself denied being the author and there is some argument as to whether it should be attributed to him.

=== Novels ===
Thérèse Philosophe (1748) (Thérèse Finds Happiness, Black Scat Books, 2020. ISBN 1734816635; Theresa the Philosopher, Grove Press, 1970. ASIN B000VRJX50)

== Archive.org ==
https://archive.org/search.php?query=creator%3A%22Argens%2C+marquis+d%27%22

== Bibliography ==
- Chisholm, Hugh, ed. (1911). "Argens, Jean Baptiste de Boyer" . Encyclopædia Britannica. Vol. 2 (11th ed.). Cambridge University Press. p. 457.
- Gasper, Julia (2013). The Marquis d'Argens: A Philosophical Life. Lexington. ISBN 978-0739182338.
- Petitfils, Jean-Christian (2005). Louis XVI. Perrin. ISBN 978-2262014841.
