= Louise Du Londel =

French actress

Louise-Jeanne Du Londel, later Lefebvre (1740 - Stockholm 1777), was a French actress, active in the Du Londel Troupe at the Swedish royal court in 1753–1771.

She was born to the theater director Jeanne Du Londel and arrived in Sweden with her mother's theater in 1753. She became one of the most popular actors of the French court theater. She was described as a favorite of the royal court, was granted her own carriage, dresser and other privileges, and was appointed teacher in French for princess Sophia Albertina of Sweden, with her sister-in-law Marguerite Morel becoming dance teacher for the princess.

She married her colleague Pierre Lefebvre.
