= Marguerite Du Londel =

French ballerina, actress and singer

- Born: Jeanne-Pierre-Marie–Marguerite Morel; 1737; La Rochelle, France.
- Died: 1804 (aged 66–67)
- Other name: Marguerite Dulondel
- Spouse: Louis Du Londel

Marguerite Du Londel or Dulondel (Jeanne-Pierre-Marie–Marguerite Morel; La Rochelle, France, 1737–1804) was a French ballerina, actress and singer (soprano). She was active in the French theater in Sweden and at that time attracted great fame. She is also known for her relationship with king Adolf Frederick of Sweden.

== Life ==
Marguerite Morel was born in La Rochelle in France. She was engaged with her mother and her two sisters in the French theater company of Jeanne Du Londel and Pierre de Laynay, which was active at the Danish royal court in 1748–53. When the French theater company was contracted to perform at the Swedish royal court in 1753, Marguerite Morel initially remained in Copenhagen with her mother and sisters, before they left for Sweden to rejoin the theater in 1755.

=== Sweden ===
The French Du Londel theater in Sweden performed for the Royal Swedish court in the palace theaters of Confidencen and Drottningholm Palace Theater during the summers, and for the public in the Bollhuset theater in Stockholm during the winters. It was a significant theater with about twenty members, patronized by the royal court and the aristocracy.

In 1759, Marguerite Morel married the actor and director of the theater, Louis Du Londel (1728–1793), and became henceforth known as Madame Du Londel or Madame Dulondel.

Marguerite Du Londel made her debut in the Du Londel French theater in a ballet before the royal court in August 1755. She was a success, and the queen of Sweden, Louisa Ulrika of Prussia, compared her to Barbara Campanini and Babette Cochois of the Prussian Ballet in Berlin.

Marguerite Du Londel was trained as a ballet dancer, actress and singer, which was not uncommon at the time. From 1759 onward, she participated as both an actress and a singer. As an actress, she mainly participated in soubrette roles. As a singer, she participated in many concerts at Riddarhuset, but also in the lyric plays staged by the theater. One of her most noted successes was Les Chinois by Hauteroche.

She was given good reviews in all three capacities of ballet dancer, singer and actress. Her multiple talents made her one of the elite members of the French theater, and she is referred to as the lead female star of the theater alongside Marie Baptiste.

It was arguably as a ballerina that Marguerite Du Londel achieved her greatest success in Sweden, and she was appointed premier ballerina. While the French company performed theater plays and lyric singing as well as ballet performances for the public at the Bollhuset theater in Stockholm, the plays and singing was reportedly in practice only frequented by the upper classes, who could understand the French language. The ballet performances, however, had a special position, as the audience did not have to be able to understand the French language to enjoy them. Consequently, the ballet performances where the only stage activity of the French theater which actually became lucrative among the wider Swedish public, and the ballets therefore played an important role when the French theater arranged their public performances in Stockholm (in opposite as when they performed for the court nobility), and became more frequent and staged alone. When the actors and singers of the French theater was mostly praised by the French language aristocracy, the French ballet dancers became known and popular outside of the nobility, and Marguerite Du Londel and her main co-star Louis Gallodier where both popular among the Swedish public and are noted to have been frequently printed in the advertises of the French theater's public performances to attract audience from outside of the nobility. Particularly in the period of 1767–71, Marguerite Du Londel was judging from the advertises a very appreciated star in Stockholm.

Among her performances as a dancers was the ballet L'Eroe Cines av Francesco Uttini, which had its premier in Drottningholm Palace Theater on 14 May 1757. It was one of the most expensive performances made by the French theater in all its twenty years in Sweden, to a cost of 6.000 riksdaler in silver, and with the cooperation of 27 members of the Livgardet.

Marguerite Du Londel also functioned as the French language teacher and dance instructor of Princess Sophie Albertine of Sweden between 1757 and 1769, while her husband and brother-in-law Pierre Lefebvre (married to her sister-in-law Louise Du Londel) was in parallel the instructor of the French language and fencing for the royal princes.

=== Royal mistress ===
Marguerite Du Londel is also known as the mistress of the monarch, king Adolf Frederick of Sweden. The affair took place between 1760 and 1765 and was reportedly the first adultery of the king since his wedding. It was noted in connection to this that she and her husband did not live together and in fact had different addresses until 1770 – while he lived with his mother, she was quartered in a room at the royal palace. The affair is mentioned by Claes Julius Ekeblad in 1760, when he mentioned that because of it, she was invited as a guest by the nobility, though never accepted as an equal by them.

The affair was an open secret in court circles but never officially acknowledged, and she had no position of being an official royal mistress. Reportedly, the queen tolerated the king to have an affair on the condition that he was discrete and never embarrassed her by having any form of official mistress, a condition he accepted and followed. However, queen Louisa Ulrika was very sensitive to any form of public embarrassment by the affair, which caused some incidents when the queen felt that discretion had not been followed. The most known incident of this affair was when the lyric play Le Pientre amoreaux de son modéle by L. Anselme had its premier at the Bollhuset theater in Stockholm, in which Marguerite Du Londel was given the line: "When I was young, I was the taste of a king". This caused great laughter in the theater, which was at that time attended by both the public and the royal family, because of the open secret of her relationship with the king, an incident which reportedly caused the queen to feel herself publicly insulted.

The affair resulted in the birth of a son, Frederici (c. 1761–1771), which she gave the patronymic Fredriksson. Frederici was taken care of by the Swedish Royal House, but he died shortly after his biological father in 1771, when he was about ten. In 1766, the king had assumed another affair with the queen's maid-of-honour Ulla von Liewen, who became the mother of the later notorious Lolotte Forssberg.

In 1799, in connection to the debated fatherhood of Lolotte Forssberg (by that time countess Stenbock), the affair between the king and Marguerite Du Londel was also mentioned in a letter from count Fredrik Georg Strömfelt to Eleonora Charlotta d'Albedyhll (though the year is here erroneously 1769 instead of 1766):

"Queen Louisa Ulrika had a lady-in-waiting by the name Ulla Liewen, engaged to count Per Brahe, son of the unhappy count Erik. In 1769 she fell sick and was delivered of "The Petite", who was the daughter of Adolf Fredrik. The queen was informed of the secret, but out of friendship for her maid of honor, who had a good name for virtue and good customs – perhaps also in reference to the utter jealousy, which Her Majesty had displayed in the matter of the charming actress and dancer m:lle Dulondel, with whom the King had a son called Fredriksson, a jealousy which caused the exile of m:lle Dulondel from the realm – the queen promised her husband to care for the child under the vow of secrecy. Those, who have seen countess Stenbock in her younger years, as well as the portrait of Ulla Liewen, can not doubt the matter. Beside, she looks like Adolf Fredrik, and this explains, why people have found such as resemblance between her and princess Sofia Albertina".

=== Later life ===
In 1771, the French Du Londel theater was dissolved by king Gustav III of Sweden after his succession to the throne. All of the members of the theater was fired without a pension, with the sole exception of Marguerite Du Londel and her husband, who were the only ones afforded a full pension by Gustav III, who referred to a promise he had given to his father. Gustav III also saw to the welfare of Marguerite Du Londel's son Frederici, whom he referred to as his half brother after the queen dowager Louisa Ulrika had informed him of a promise she had given the late king – Frederici, however, died later that same year.

On 21 June 1771, Louis and Marguerite Du Londel departed Sweden for France, despite a promise from Gustav III of doubling their pension if they remained in Sweden, as he would like them to be instructors at a theater school he planned to found. They settled in Metz in 1778. When some of the remaining French artists performed in the Swedish court in 1780, Gustav III remarked that the only thing preventing them from being a full theatre was that the Du Londel couple was in Paris.

The Du Londel couple returned to Sweden during the French Revolution in 1792, because they felt unsafe in France because of their royalist sympathies as well as Louis Du Londel's noble descent on his mother's side. The following year, Marguerite Du Londel was widowed, and the new regency government of Gustav IV Adolf of Sweden discontinued her pension. She lived on the charity of friends, particularly her god daughter, the celebrated actress Marie Louise Marcadet. When Marcadet left for France in 1795, she was in a difficult situation, but the following year, her daughter Marie Louise Dulondel (1776–1847) married her former colleague Louis Gallodier, and she was thereafter supported by her son-in-law until her death.

== See also ==
- Elisabeth Soligny
