= Babet =

Babet may refer to:

== People ==
- Ralph Babet (born 1983), Australian politician
- Raphaël Babet (1894–1957), French politician
- Babette Cochois (also known as "Babet Cochois," 1723–1780), French ballerina and writer

== Other uses ==
- HMS Babet (1794), a British, later French, warship
- Stade Raphaël Babet, a sports stadium on Réunion, Indian Ocean
- Storm Babet, October 2023, Europe

== See also ==
- Babette (disambiguation)
