= Jeanne Du Londel =

French actress and theatre director

Marie Jeanne Du Londel also called 'du Londel' and 'Dulondel', née Chateauneuf (1706 – in Stockholm 1772) was a French actress and theatre director. She was the leader of the Du Londel Troupe.

She was married to the actor Jean Du Londel.

She performed in The Hague 1738–1740 in the troupe of Nicolas Huau, and 1747–1753 in Copenhagen in Denmark. In 1753, her contract in Copenhagen in Denmark was ended. She was at this point the joint director of the troupe alongside Pierre de Laynay. They accepted the invitation of the Swedish Queen, Louisa Ulrika of Prussia, and arrived in Sweden the same year.

In 1756, she retired as a director and transferred the leadership of the troupe to her son, Louis Du Londel. Her daughter Louise Du Londel (1740–1777) became a favourite actress within the French theatre in Sweden and the Swedish royal court as well as a French teacher to Princess Sophia Albertine of Sweden, and her daughter-in-law Marguerite Du Londel dance teacher to Sophia Albertine.

In circa 1734, she had a son, Adolf Fredriksson (c. 1734-1771), with the future Adolf Frederick, King of Sweden, who at that point was not yet king or even crown prince of Sweden; Adolf Fredriksson was taken care of by his father a became a captain in the Swedish Army.
