= Lolotte Forssberg =

Swedish noble and lady-in-waiting

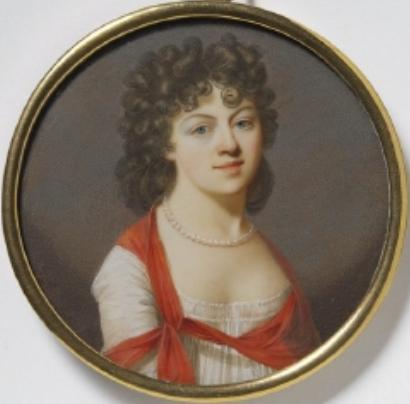
- Born: 1766; Sweden
- Died: 1840 (aged 73–74)
- Other names: Lolotte Forssberg
- Occupations: companion, lady in waiting
- Known for: supposed secret daughter of king Adolf Frederick of Sweden

Fredrika Charlotte "Lolotte" Forssberg (1766–1840) was a Swedish noble and lady-in-waiting, later countess Stenbock. She was one of the most talked about people of her time as the possible child of King Adolf Frederick of Sweden. Princess Sophia Albertina of Sweden investigated her birth in the 1790s and tried to have her acknowledged as the daughter of her father. The truth is unconfirmed, though it is considered likely that she was the illegitimate daughter of the king.

== Early life ==
Officially the child of a servant at the royal court, she was widely rumored to be the child of king Adolf Fredrik and the noble lady in waiting Ulla von Liewen. The queen, Louisa Ulrika of Prussia, was said to tolerate her husband's affairs as long as he was discreet and did not take an official mistress, and the king never did have a mistress openly. Lolotte Forssberg was adopted by assistant Eric Forssberg and Hedvig Charlotta D'Orchimont. King Adolf Fredrik died in 1771.

Forssberg was eventually placed in the court of the Queen Dowager Louisa Ulrika as her foster child upon the suggestion of Louisa Ulrika's French chamber maid Michelle Elisabeth d'Ivry. According to what was later claimed, she came into this position after d'Ivry, had first suggested to her foster mother that she be placed in the care of a French official of the Queen Dowager, who was then able to see her at her court and given the opportunity to express her wish to take her as her foster child: d'Ivry was allegedly assigned this task by Louisa Ulrika. The Queen Dowager was quite found of Forssberg, and referred to her as La Petite.

When the dowager queen Louisa Ulrika died in 1782, she entrusted Forssberg to her daughter, Princess Sophia Albertina, and asked her to see to her well-being. Forssberg was described as a person with great charm, which was often given as the reason to why she became so favored by the royal family. In 1783, for example, she accompanied Princess Charlotte on a trip to the country. Sophia Albertina was very fond of Forssberg, who became her companion.

== Investigation ==
In May or April 1795, a letter was found during a dinner at Sophia Albertina. The letter was addressed to an unnamed woman from another unnamed woman, and described the circumstances during the birth and childhood of Forssberg, at the time unofficial companion of Sophia Albertina.

The letter claimed Forssberg was born in the seventh month as the daughter of king Adolf Frederick and was left in the care of a merchant. The mother was not clearly pointed out, but could from the wording be interpreted to be either queen Louisa Ulrika or a lover of Adolf Frederik. In 1776, on the suggestion of the French chamber maid of Louisa Ulrika, madame d’Ivry, the child was moved to the custody of the spouse of the queen dowagers French hovmästare, from which she was taken care of by the queen dowager herself, after which her foster mother was sworn to an oath of silence. The letter also criticized Sophia Albertina for not having made Forssberg her lady in waiting and married her to a noble, but excused her with the suggestion, that she was perhaps not aware that Forssberg was her sister. The letter was clearly written by someone with knowledge about the affairs at court, and it also contained information which seemed likely.

Forssberg was indeed raised in the household of Louisa Ulrika on the recommendation of madame d’Ivry, and Louisa Ulrika was described as deeply devoted to Forssberg, whom she treated in private as her own child and promised a great future. Louisa Ulrika also took a promise from Sophia Albertina that she should always love Forssberg and take care of her when Louisa Ulrika was dead.

Sophia Albertina and her sister-in-law Hedwig Elizabeth Charlotte of Holstein-Gottorp made investigations on the matter and questioned the foster mother of Forssberg, who assured them that she was the biological mother, but who behaved suspiciously enough for them to doubt that she was telling the truth.

The 12 October 1795 Sophia Albertina received an anonymous letter addressed to her with her mother's handwriting and seal.

The letter was written by an anonymous woman who assured her that Forssberg was her sister but that her foster mother would never reveal anything, and that Louisa Ulrika had made a promise to Adolf Frederick that this fact was not to be revealed during the lifetime of Gustav III of certain reasons, and that Louisa Ulrika would have arranged a marriage for Forssberg to a noble if she had not died before. With the letter came a package containing a pearl necklace, a diamond and a miniature of Adolf Frederick.

On 30 November, Sophia Albertina advertised, in discreet wording, in the paper Dagligt Allehanda to search the identity of the unknown writer of the letter.

Sophia Albertina was by now herself convinced that Forssberg was her sister and revealed the affair to the regent de facto, Gustaf Adolf Reuterholm, and the royal family.

In January 1799, Sophia Albertina revealed the story to the minister of justice count Wachtmeister, who told her that he believed the story but that Forssberg could not be acknowledged without proof. The king questioned the foster mother of Forssberg who refused to admit anything by saying that she had given an oath of secrecy, and an investigation was issued by the monarch and the minister of justice

== Public recognition ==
In 1799, Sophia Albertina announced in public that Forssberg was her sister in Sweden and Germany. The announcement made a scandal in Germany and the Preussian royal court initially refused to receive Sophia Albertina and Forssberg when they arrived to Berlin Gustav IV Adolf of Sweden made a public denial of Forssberg's birth but eventually agreed to have Forssberg made official lady in waiting to Sophia Albertina and to be presented at court.

Within the aristocracy, the rumour pointed out Forssberg as the daughter of king Adolf Frederick and the lady in waiting Ulrica Elisabeth von Liewen, which is regarded as the likely truth, though unconfirmed Queen Louisa Ulrika was to have promised to keep the birth of Forssberg secret and take care of her future, on condition that the relationship between Adolf Frederick and Liewen was kept secret, as she was deeply insulted by the adultery of her spouse: at the time, Adolf Frederick recently had another child with the ballerina Marguerite Du Londel The likeness between Forssberg, Frederick Adolf and Liewen was also pointed out.

The story of the parentage of Lolotte Forssberg (by then countess Stenborg) was described in 1799 by count Fredrik Georg Strömfelt in a letter to Eleonora Charlotta d'Albedyhll (though the year is here 1769 instead of 1766):

"Queen Louisa Ulrika had a lady-in-waiting by the name Ulla Liewen, engaged to count Per Brahe, son of the unhappy count Erik. In 1769 she fell sick and was delivered of "The Petite", who was the daughter of Adolf Fredrik. The queen was informed of the secret, but out of friendship for her maid of honor, who had a good name for virtue and good customs - perhaps also in reference to the utter jealousy, which Her Majesty had displayed in the matter of the charming actress and dancer m:lle Dulondel, with whom the King had a son called Fredriksson, a jealousy which caused the exile of m:lle Dulondel from the realm - the queen promised her husband to care for the child under the vow of secrecy. Those, who have seen countess Stenbock in her younger years, as well as the portrait of Ulla Liewen, can not doubt the matter. Beside, she looks like Adolf Fredrik, and this explains, why people have found such as resemblance between her and princess Sofia Albertina".

Sophia Albertina admitted that she believed Liewen was the mother of Forssberg but that she would have like to have kept it a secret and that she was surprised that everyone seemed to suspect the same.

== Marriage and later life ==
Forssberg was engaged to count Carl Edvard Gyldenstolpe, who broke the engagement in 1798 (he married Vilhelmina Gyldenstolpe, daughter of the husband of Lolotte's alleged mother Ulla von Liewen), and in January 1799 to count Gustaf Harald Stenbock, courtier of Sophia Albertina, who had assisted in the investigations. Sophia Albertina arranged a marriage between Forssberg and count Gustaf Harald Stenbock, (related to queen Katarina Stenbock), an unusual arrangement for a woman who was officially the child of a servant. Later, it was said that the story of her royal father was made up just so she could marry the count. Stenbock believed that a marriage to Forssberg made in the in-law of the royal house. Their marriage was ridiculed as a scandal by the nobility. Lolotte was officially presented at court 10 May 1799 by Augusta von Fersen.

The favoritism of the princess gave rise to the rumour that Forssberg was in fact the secret child of Sophia Albertina herself. Sophie Albertine continued by making Forssberg her formal and official companion in 1800, her lady-in-waiting in 1818, and her head lady-in-waiting in 1823. At the death of Sophia Albertina in 1829, Forssberg was remembered in her will.

Whatever the truth of Forssberg's true identity, the stories of her birth, both that she was the secret daughter of the king, and that she was the secret child of the princess, were among the most talked about of the era. When she married in 1799, she was referred to as ”one of the most talked about people at that time”. The truth of her parentage is unconfirmed, but it is considered likely that she was the secret illegitimate daughter of king Adolf Frederick and Ulla von Liewen.

== Issue ==
Forssberg had a child in her thirties. In 1854 her son inherited Sundby Manor at Ornö, which as entailed property remained in his line to the present day.
