= Henrik Otto Albedyll =

Swedish military personnel

Freiherr Henrik Otto von Albedyll
- Born: 13 August 1666; Swedish Livonia (now Latvia)
- Died: 8 January 1738 (aged 71); Hamburg (now Germany)
- Military career
- Allegiance: Sweden
- Rank: Lieutenant General
- Conflicts: Great Northern War

Henrik Otto von Albedyll (1666 —1738), was a Swedish freiherr and military officer of German Baltic origin. In 1719 he was acting General Governor of Swedish Livonia.

== Biography ==
Henrik Otto von Albedyl was born in a family of an old German Baltic nobility ( freehold family d'Albedyhll ). Family lost it seat in Swedish House of Nobility due to absence from the country for more than 200 years. He became musketeer at the Rosens regiment in imperial service in 1683, entered as fähnrich (Officer candidate) in Swedish service at Ostrobothnia's regiment 1685, became lieutenant at Mauritz Vellingk regiment in 1687 and captain there in 1689 In the same year he joined William of Orange and participated in Flanders campaigns. In 1691 he became major at Vilhelm of the Saxony-Gotha regiment and participated with this in the Allies' campaign on the Rhine. In 1694, Albedyl became Colonel of the Brandenburg-Kulmbach regiment in the service of the Republic of Venice and proved under the command of Field Marshal Adam Heinrich von Steinau the Italian camps in the following years. He joined the regiment in Saxon service in 1696 and was arrested in Dresden in June 1700 after the Great Nordic War outbreak since he refused to participate in the war against Sweden. At the same time, he was convicted in Sweden of life, honor and goods for failing to obey the order for a position in Swedish service. However, this was soon forgotten, and after having been [Major General] and resigned from Saxon service in March 1702, Albedyl joined the Swedish army in Warsaw on 22 May 1702 and followed it during the following campaign there. among other things, he participated in the Battle of Kliszów. Albedyl was laid off to Riga in October of that year and from there went to Hannover in the spring of 1704. On 9 November 1707 he became the chief of Swedish service and head of a recruited German dragon regiment, set up by Henrik Vilhelm von Görtz. He participated in this campaign against Russia in 1707-09 but became a prisoner at Raschovka on 16 February 1709. After being released from Russian captivity on 18 January 1712, Albedyl at Stralsund happened to be in Danish captivity. He became Major General of the Cavalry on 15 November 1712, Major General of the Infantry and commander of the Jönköping Regiment 1714. In 1716 he was released from Danish captivity against the castle, became Lieutenant General of the infantry, and participated in the 1718 Norwegian campaign, during which he was given command of the so-called Warmland Corps. On 26 August 1719 he was appointed governor of Riga, although the city was long occupied by the Russians. He was elevated to a free-standing position on 2 March 1720, resigned from the Swedish service in 1724 and became commander in 1725 in Hamburg.

== See also ==
- Eleonora Charlotta d'Albedyhll
