= Thérèse the Philosopher =

1748 novel by Jean-Baptiste de Boyer

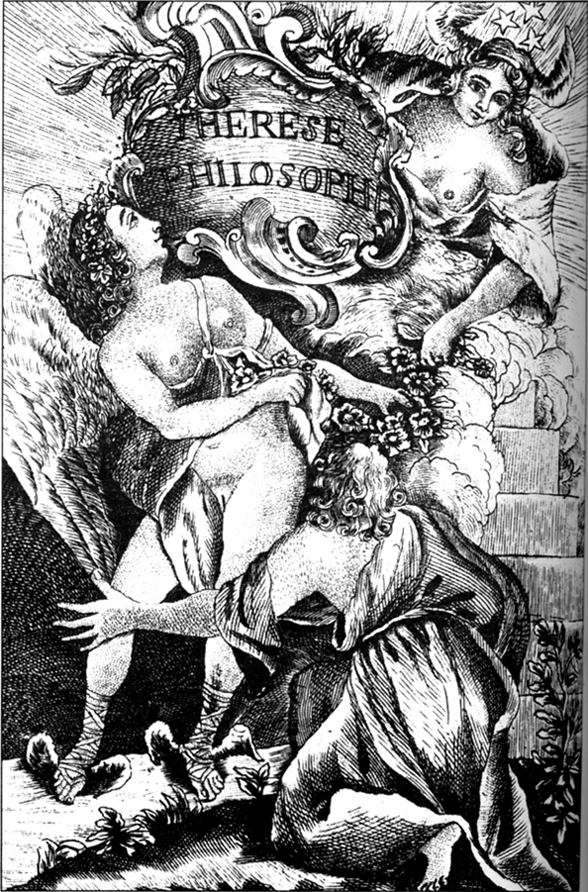
- Author: Anonymous, Attributed to Jean-Baptiste de Boyer, Marquis d'Argens
- Original title: Thérèse Philosophe
- Language: French
- Genre: Fiction, Novel, Libertine Literature, Comedy
- Publisher: Unknown (1748, The Hague, Belgium; French), Grove Press (1970, English), Black Scat Books (2020, English)
- Publication date: 1748
- Publication place: France
- English publication date: 1970 (Thérèse The Philosopher), 2020 (Thérèse Finds Happiness)
- Pages: 208 (English)

Thérèse Philosophe (Therese the Philosopher) is a 1748 French novel ascribed to Jean-Baptiste de Boyer, Marquis d'Argens, or, according to a minority opinion, Denis Diderot and others. While it does detail sexual acts (and could be considered a pornographic novel) the work illustrates clerical hypocrisy, argues against Catholic/Christian dogma and presents at least two independent female characters – all factors that could account for its significant popularity in 18th-century France and Europe (despite it being banned by the ancien régime).

== Summary ==
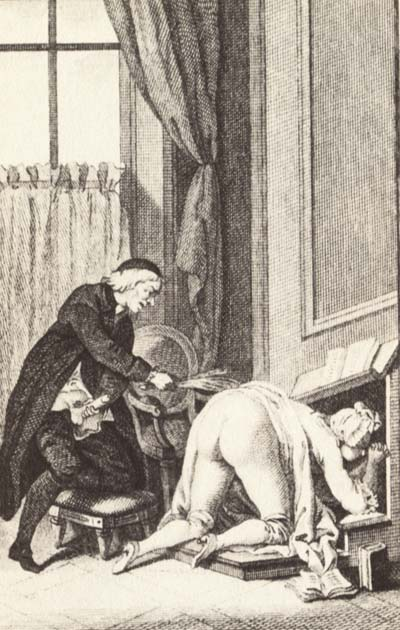
Illustration for Thérèse philosophe, Father Dirrag abusing Eradice.

The narrative starts with Therese, sexually precocious in spite of herself, from solid bourgeois stock, being placed by her mother in a convent when she is 11 years old. There she eventually becomes sick because her pleasure principle is not permitted to express itself, putting her body into disorder, and bringing her close to the grave until her mother finally yanks her out of the convent at age 23.

She then becomes a student of Father Dirrag, a Jesuit who secretly teaches materialism. After hearing from her fellow student Mlle. Eradice about how much progress she is making in her religious 'education', Mlle. Eradice invites Therese to hide in the room where Dirrag and Mlle. Eradice will hold their next spiritual 'session'. Through flagellation and penetration, Dirrag gives Mlle. Eradice what she thinks is spiritual ecstasy but is actually sexual. "Father Dirrag" and "Mlle. Eradice" are named after anagrams of Jean-Baptiste Girard and Catherine Cadière, who were involved in a highly publicized trial for the illicit relationship between priest and student in 1730.

Confused and but mostly intrigued/aroused by what she observed, Therese she speaks to the Abbé T. in confession, who recommends she not expose Father Dirrag and Mlle. Eradice, and suggests regular 'external' masturbation as a means of managing her own surging desire for pleasure, whilst maintaining her virginity - but asks that she return to confession after each instance. Given her propensity for the activity and their accompanying discussions in confession, Abbé T. invites Therese to join him at the country estate of his friend Mme. C.

Mme C. is an attractive, middle-aged woman who was married off to a far older (but wealthy) old man at a very young age (as was common at that time). After suffering the death of a child at birth and coming close to her own death at the same time, she committed to never have intercourse again and after the death of her husband stayed unwed for the rest of her life. Through her friendship with Abbé T. though she pursued pleasures and discussed libertine political and religious philosophy (often before/during/after) her and Abbé T. pleasure each other (though precluding impregnation).

Abbé T. is clearly the same character as figures in another, eponymous, coming-of-age, soft-core libertine novel published that same year or possibly one year earlier: Ecclesiastical Laurels, or Abbot T.'s Campaigns with the Triumph of the Nuns, attributed to Jacques Rochette La Morlière; this latter novel is one of several titles listed towards the end of Therese the Philosopher as belonging to the library owned by the count, which library he loans to Therese as part of a bet.

Therese's sexual education continues with her relationship with Mme. Bois-Laurier, an experienced prostitute, who is also a virgin much to her clients' surprise, delight and also disappointment. Many a John will try to break through her maidenhead, without success. This section of the novel constitutes an arguably hilarious variation on the whore dialogues that were common in early pornographic novels.

Finally, Therese meets the unnamed Count who is impressed by her understanding of philosophy and invites her to join him at his estate as his 'mistress'. She refuses him intercourse out of her fear of death in childbirth (following the advice of Mme. C.) and also because she finds masturbation to be sufficiently pleasurable in and of itself. He makes a bet with her. If she can last two weeks in his library of erotic books and paintings without masturbating, he will not ask for intercourse with her. Therese loses and becomes the Count's permanent mistress, but maintaining withdrawal as a means of avoiding pregnancy.

== Philosophical and social concepts ==
Particularly during Therese's stay with Abbe T. and Mme. C, philosophical issues are discussed amongst the characters, including materialism, hedonism and atheism. Abbe T. offers an argument against the Christian/Catholic definition of God, positing a Deist worldview with Lucretian themes about happiness & materialism (all phenomena are matter in motion). With respect to Christian/Catholic theology, regarding the existence of evil: "God would only have to destroy the devil and we would all be saved. There must be a lot of injustice or weakness on his part!" and "Thus, with this foreknowledge, God, in creating us, knew in advance that we would be infallibly damned and eternally miserable."

The book not only draws attention to the sexual repression of women at the time of the enlightenment, but also to the exploitation of religious authority through salacious acts.

== Influence and adaptations ==
- Dostoevsky referred repeatedly to the novel in his working notes for both The Idiot and The Possessed.
- Thérése Philosophe was loosely adapted as the second segment of Walerian Borowczyk's French anthology film Immoral Tales (1973). Therese was played by Charlotte Alexandra.

== Sources ==
- Darnton, Robert. The Forbidden Best-sellers of Pre-revolutionary France W. W. Norton & Company, 1996 ISBN 0-393-31442-1
- Brumfield, William C. "Thérèse philosophe and Dostoevsky's Great Sinner," Comparative Literature, vol. 32 (summer 1980) 3:238-52.
