= Michelle Elisabeth d'Ivry =

Michelle Elisabeth d'Ivry (c. 1731 - 12 February 1795) was a Swedish (originally French) spy.

D'Ivry was from France and married to a Monsieur d'Ivry in Paris. She arrived in Sweden as the mistress of the royal court jeweler Sutzer. From 1776 to 1782, she was the Kammarfru of the Queen Dowager Louisa Ulrika. She made herself the trusted confidant of Louisa Ulrika; it was reportedly she who introduced Lolotte Forssberg to Louisa Ulrika, and she was also entrusted secret political tasks by the queen dowager. She functioned as the paid agent of King Gustav III of Sweden at the court of his mother. This was regarded to be a vital task especially during the conflict of 1778–82, when Louisa Ulrika accused the King of having another man father the heir to the throne for him.

After the death of Louisa Ulrika in 1782, Michelle Elisabeth d'Ivry was awarded double the pension given to the other members of the court of the Queen Dowager, which had a position of the same rank as she, with the condition that she did not leave the country and did not participate in social life. She died during the minority of King Gustav IV Adolf of Sweden, upon which her left papers was sealed and confiscated by representatives of the guardian government.
