= Ulla von Liewen =

Ulrica "Ulla" Elisabeth von Liewen (24 February 1747, in Stockholm – 16 May 1775, in Uppsala), was a Swedish courtier and baroness. She was at one point the royal mistress of Adolf Frederick, King of Sweden and is known as the likely mother of Lolotte Forssberg.

Ulla von Liewen was the daughter of the noble Carl Gustaf von Liewen and Ulrika Eleonora Ribbing af Zernava. She served as maid of honor to the queen of Sweden. Originally engaged to count Per Brahe, she was impregnated by the king and gave birth to a daughter. The queen was informed, and agreed to keep the matter a secret and care for the child.

The story was described in 1799 by count Fredrik Georg Strömfelt to Eleonora Charlotta d'Albedyhll after the attempt of Princess Sophia Albertine of Sweden to have Lolotte Forssberg officially acknowledged as her sister, by then countess Stenbock by marriage (though the year is here 1769 instead of 1766):

"Queen Louisa Ulrika had a lady-in-waiting by the name Ulla Liewen, engaged to count Per Brahe, son of the unhappy count Erik. In 1769 she fell sick and was delivered of "The Petite", who was the daughter of Adolf Fredrik. The queen was informed of the secret, but out of friendship for her maid of honor, who had a good name for virtue and the purity of her customs - perhaps also in reference to the utter jealousy, which Her Majesty had displayed in the matter of the charming actress and dancer m:lle Dulondel, with whom the King had a son called Fredriksson, a jealousy which caused the exile of m:lle Dulondel from the realm - the queen promised her husband to care for the child under the vow of secrecy. Those, who have seen countess Stenbock in her younger years, as well as the portrait of Ulla Liewen, can not doubt the matter. Beside, she looks like Adolf Fredrik, and this explains, why people have found such as resemblance between her and princess Sofia Albertina".

Princess Sophia Albertine stated to her intimate friend, countess Caroline Ehrencrona, the she had several reasons to believe that Ulla Liewen was the mother of Lolotte Forssberg, but that she would keep quite about it out of concern for the Liewen family, even though the matter seemed to be an open secret in high society.

In 1770, Ulla Liewen married the politician and courtier baron Charles De Geer (1747–1805). Their daughter Charlotte De Geer later married Hans Henric von Essen. The daughter of her spouse in his second marriage, Vilhelmina, served as mistress of the Robes to Désirée Clary and married Carl Edvard Gyldenstolpe, who was at one point engaged to marry Lolotte Forssberg.

== Sources ==
- Cecilia af Klercker (1927). Hedvig Elisabeth Charlottas dagbok VI 1797-1799. P.A. Norstedt & Söners förlag Stockholm. Sid. 290-92, 335
- Oscar Fredrik Strokirk: Kultur- och personhistoriska anteckningar / Tredje delen
