= Ulla Möllersvärd =

Finnish noblewoman and courtier

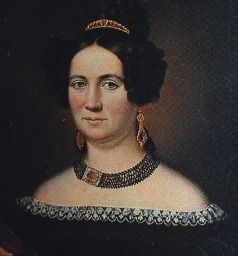
Ulla Möllersvärd

Ulrika "Ulla" Ottiliana Möllersvärd (August 4, 1791–1878) was a Finnish courtier in service of the Russian Imperial court. She was rumored to have been the secret daughter of Princess Sophie Albertine of Sweden, and the lover of Tsar Alexander I of Russia.

== Life ==
She was one of seven children of the noble Carl Adolph Möllersvärd and Maria Charlotta L'Estrade, and sister of Carl Magnus Möllersvärd. She is foremost known for the occasion, where she danced with Tsar Alexander I of Russia at the Diet of Porvoo in 1809, which was repeated at Mäntsälä some days later and gave rise to rumors that they had an affair: the incident has been portrayed in fiction. She was the subject of much attention in contemporary Finland. She was claimed to be the foster child of Möllersvärd and in actuality the secret illegitimate daughter of Princess Sophia Albertina of Sweden; Möllersvärd was also reputed to have had a secret child with Tsar Alexander.

She was maid of honor to the Russian empress Elizabeth Alexeievna (Louise of Baden) from 1811 to 1813. The last year, she left court to marry noble general major Odert Reinhold von Essen. She divorced him the following year and left him to live with her unmarried brother.

== Legacy ==
Möllersvärd has been portrayed in fiction, both literature and film. Her rumored affair with Tsar Alexander was portrayed in the novel Tanssi yli hautojen by Mika Waltari (1944), which was made into a film in 1950.
