= The Amours of Sainfroid and Eulalia =

1854 pornographic book

The Amours of Sainfroid and Eulalia or Venus in the Cloister is a pornographic book published in New York City in 1854, translated from the French Les Amours de Sainfroit, jésuite, et Eulalie, fille dévote published by Isaac van der Kloot at The Hague in 1729. It is an anticlerical account of the seduction of a nun by a Jesuit priest. Henry Spencer Ashbee suggests that it is based on an historical incident in Toulon in 1728–29, involving Jesuit priest Jean-Baptiste Girard and alleged witch Catherine Cadière.

== See also ==
- Venus in the Cloister (1683, tr.1724)
