= Babette (given name) =

Babette is a feminine given name, a pet form of Barbara. Notable people with the name include:

- Babette Babich (born 1956), American philosopher
- Babette Cole (1950–2017), English children's writer and illustrator
- Babette Cochois (1725–1780), French ballerina
- Babette DeCastro (1925–1992), one of the DeCastro Sisters singing trio
- Babette Deutsch (1895–1982), American poet, critic, translator, and novelist
- Babette Josephs (1940–2021), American Democratic politician and attorney
- Babette Mangolte, French-American cinematographer and film director
- Babette March (born 1941), German-born American fashion model and the first Sports Illustrated Swimsuit Issue cover model
- Babette or Barbara Ployer (1765–1811), Austrian piano and composition pupil of Mozart
- Babette Preußler (born 1968), East German pair skater
- Babette Rosmond (1921–1997), American author and editor
- Babette Stephens (1910–2001), Australian actress and director
- Babette van Teunenbroek (born 1960), Dutch cricketer
- Babette van Veen (born 1968), Dutch actress and singer

== Fictional characters ==
- Babette Dell, supporting character on The WB drama Gilmore Girls, portrayed by Sally Struthers
- Babette Hersant, principal character of the 1987 Danish film Babette's Feast
