= Catherine Cadière =

Alleged 18th-century French witch

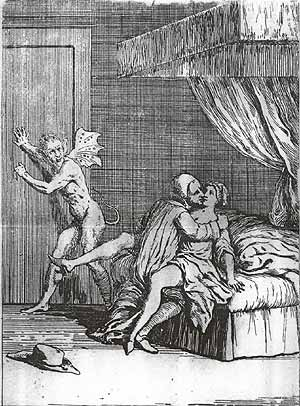
The seduction of Catherine Cadière by the jesuit Jean-Baptiste Girard. Contemporary engraving shows the devil guiding the jesuit.

Catherine Cadière, or Marie-Catherine Cadière (12 November 1709 in Toulon, year of death unknown), was an alleged French witch. The trial of Catherine Cadière in 1731 is one of the most famous of its kind in French history, and have been referred to many times in literature, notably in the pornographic novel Thérèse philosophe.

== Background ==
Catherine Cadière was born to a merchant whose health was ruined by the plague in 1720, and lived under the guardianship of her widowed mother and three brothers. When she was eighteen, she joined "a loosely organized group of women who, through living in their own homes, were dedicated to prayer and meditation". The spiritual director of these devotees of the "Third Order of St. Theresa" was the Jesuit Jean-Baptiste Girard (1680–1733), whom she met in 1728. She was encouraged by Girard in the belief that she suffered from holy convulsions and saintly stigmata and spiritual visions, which Girard presented as the symptoms of a saint. He visited her often and possibly abused her sexually. Her emotional state during these experiences was described as hysterical.

== Trial ==
In June 1730, Girard was investigated for abuse and corruption, and Cadière was placed in a convent. She was released in September 1730. The case was transferred to the court of Aix-en-Provence. Cadière was first placed in a convent in Toulon and then taken to a convent in Aix for the trial, which began on 10 January 1731 under the Parlement of Aix. The Parlement at Aix took evidence and witness accounts for almost a year. She was defended by Chaudon. The case drew attention from the whole of France, and Cadière was supported by parliamentarians, noblewomen, and the public in Toulon and Aix. The case was seen as a case against the Jesuit order, and Cadière was seen as a symbol of the corruption of the Jesuits. Cadière accused Girard of bewitching her by making her fall in love with him: "You see here before you a young girl of twenty years, plunged into an abyss of evils, but whose heart is still unsullied." When they returned with their verdict on 11 October 1731, the judges were split 12 to 12. President Lebret cast the deciding vote, and he "returned Father Girard to the ecclesiastical authorities for his irregular conduct as a priest, and sent Catherine back to her mother. By this dismissal he indicated the charges of sorcery were not proved."

== Verdict ==
On 11 September 1731 Cadière was sentenced to death, but on 10 October 1731 she was declared innocent. Her acquittal and release was greeted with rejoicing from the public. She was turned over to her mother, who was to remove her to prevent chaos, so that civil order could be restored. However, Cadière's fate after this is unknown.

== See also ==
- The Amours of Sainfroid and Eulalia
- Witch trials in the early modern period

== Sources ==
- A modern treatment in English: Mita Choudhury, The Wanton Jesuit and the Wayward Saint. A Tale of Sex, Religion and Politics in 18th-Century France (Penn State UP, 2015)
