= Sophia Albertina, Abbess of Quedlinburg =

Sophia Albertina
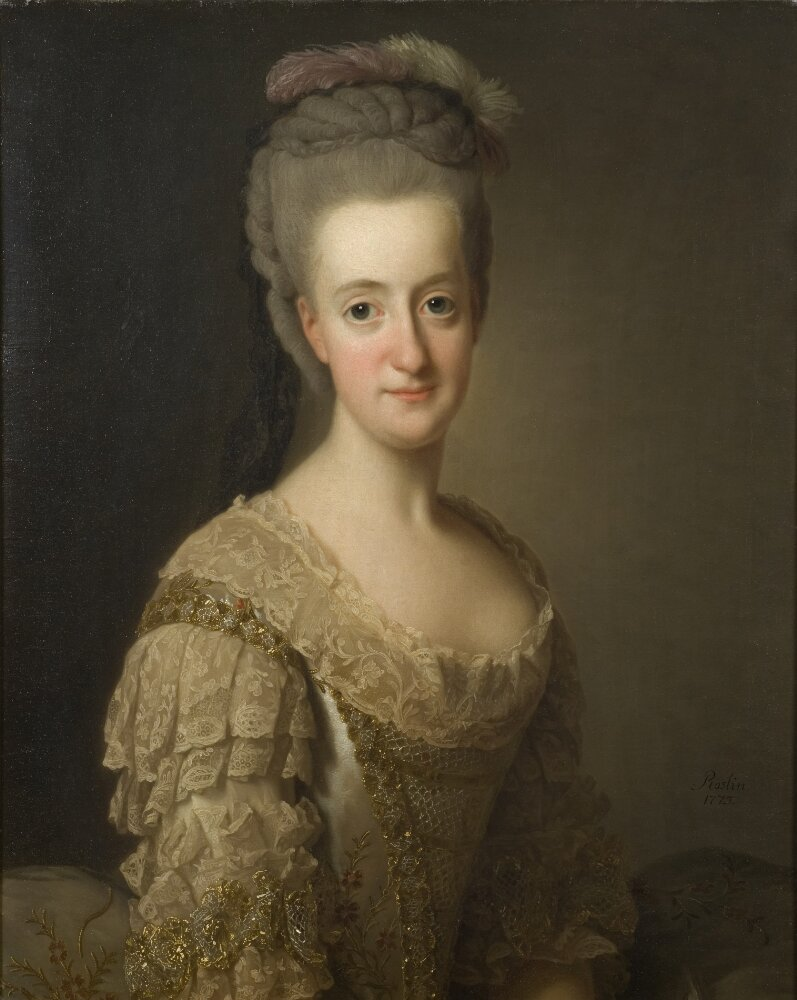
- Portrait by Alexander Roslin, c. 1775

Princess-Abbess of Quedlinburg
- Reign: 1787–1803
- Predecessor: Anna Amalia
- Born: 8 October 1753; Wrangel Palace (Kungshuset), Stockholm, Sweden
- Died: 17 March 1829 (aged 75); Arvfurstens palats, Stockholm
- Burial: Riddarholmen Church, Stockholm
- Issue: Ulla Möllersvärd (rumored)
Names
- Sophia Maria Lovisa Fredrika Albertina
- House: Holstein-Gottorp
- Father: Adolf Frederick of Sweden
- Mother: Louisa Ulrika of Prussia
- Religion: Lutheran

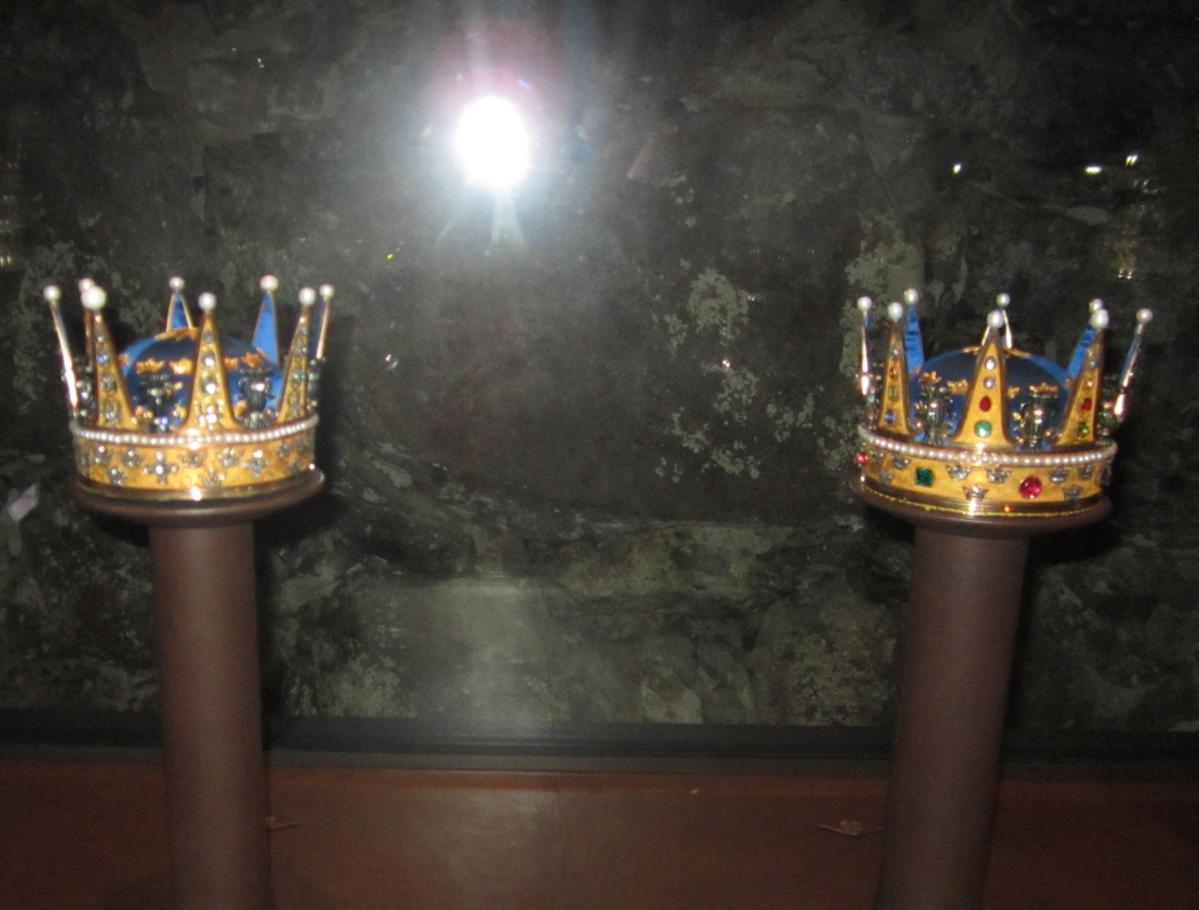
Coronet (left) created for Sophia Albertina and worn at her brother Gustav's coronation in 1772.

Princess Sophia Albertina of Sweden (Sophia Maria Lovisa Fredrika Albertina; 8 October 1753 – 17 March 1829) was the last Princess-Abbess of Quedlinburg Abbey, and as such reigned as vassal monarch of the Holy Roman Empire.

Sophia Albertina was the daughter of King Adolf Frederick of Sweden and Louisa Ulrika of Prussia. She was thus a princess of Sweden, a princess of Holstein-Gottorp and a sister to Gustav III of Sweden. She was a member of the Accademia di San Luca. When her brother Charles XIII of Sweden and the rest of the royal family also became Norwegian royalty in 1814, that did not include Sophia Albertina who then officially was called Royal Princess (of no country).

She was given her two names in honour of her two grandmothers: the Prussian Queen Sophia Dorothea of Hanover and Margravine Albertina Frederica of Baden-Durlach.

== Biography ==
=== At the Swedish court ===
Sophia Albertina of Sweden.

Sophia Albertina was tutored under the supervision of Baroness Ulrica Schönström, Baroness Kristina Kurck and Countess Magdalena Stenbock, all in succession the head of her court: Eric af Sotberg served as her governor, and she was tutored in French by Louise Du Londel, in dance by Marguerite Morel, drawing by Jean Eric Rehn and music by Francesco Uttini. Her mother may not have wished her to marry, as she arranged a formal position for her at Quedlinburg Abbey as early as 1767. Living at the court of her mother, she was somewhat isolated after 1771, when her mother and her reigning brother became more and more at odds with each other.

Sophia Albertina and her youngest brother, Prince Frederick Adolf of Sweden, were the favourites of their mother, and also very close themselves. Sophia Albertina lived at her mother's court and under her strict control until the latter's death in 1782.

During the conflict of 1778, when her mother, the Queen Dowager, supported the rumour that her brother King Gustav III had given the task to father his heir to Count Adolf Fredrik Munck, Sophia Albertina and her brother Frederick sided with their mother. In 1780, when the carriage of the Queen Dowager and Sophia Albertina met the carriages of the King and the Queen, Sophia Albertina avoided a confrontation by waving at the royal couple, thereby hiding her mother from view.

In 1781, she came in conflict with the King, who was close to banning her from court when her mother refused her to pay her respects to the Queen, but the situation was solved by her sister-in-law, Hedvig Elisabeth Charlotte of Holstein-Gottorp. At her mother's death in 1782, she and her brother Frederick burned some of their mother's papers before they could be seen by the King. In Stockholm, a palace was built as her residence, known today as Arvfurstens Palats. Unlike her brothers, she was not given a residence in the countryside because she was expected always to accompany her brothers' court.

Sophia Albertina was not described as beautiful or intelligent, but she enjoyed parties and participated enthusiastically in the festivities of the court of Gustav III. According to her sister-in-law, Hedvig Elizabeth Charlotte, she was good hearted but very temperamental and hard to handle, and she is described as generous and caring but easily provoked into conflicts. Sophia Albertina did not like to see women be treated badly, and often intervened when she considered a woman at court to have been insulted or in any way badly treated, such as when Gustav III in her eyes treated the ladies-in-waiting participating in his amateur theatre too hard, and when her sister-in-law was given a bad seat in the theatre, which caused Sophia Albertina to accuse her of not attending to her rights. She also intervened for Magdalena Rudenschöld during the Armfelt conspiracy, and managed to have the former's death sentence revoked.

During the Riksdag of 1789, she was present with her sister-in-law during the sessions through a secret window which faced the assembly hall. The Union and Security Act placed the King in opposition with his nobility. When her sister-in-law and her brothers agreed that the latter two would issue a public protest at the next session, she supported them – however in the end no protest was made. Sophia Albertina however would not support any further demonstrations against the monarch, and reportedly convinced her brother Prince Frederick not to use violent actions toward the monarchy. The female members of the nobility, led by Jeanna von Lantingshausen, issued a political demonstration in a social boycott of the monarch by refusing to participate in his court life while continuing to visit her and her sister-in-law Hedvig Elisabeth Charlotte, who were known to be in opposition to the Security Act, and who demonstrated themselves by refusing to participate in representation. This was effective, because the Queen, Sophia Magdalena, was reclusive and Hedvig Elisabeth Charlotte and Sophie Albertine had always fulfilled most of the representation at court, and the King accused her of leading: "A guard which placed themselves above all authority. They captivate the senses by their beauty and talents and rule the views and interests". The demonstration was effectively put to a halt when the King had Jeanna von Lantingshausen banished from court and refused any contact with his sister and his sister-in-law.

Sophia Albertina was interested in theatre and dance, though according to Axel von Fersen the Elder she lacked talent for it, and she also participated in the amateur theatre at court. She was interested in riding and hunting and had at least thirteen named dogs as pets.

She painted in pastel and made profile portraits and caricatures. During a visit to Rome in 1793, she was inducted into the Accademia di San Luca. Like her sister-in-law, she enjoyed hunting. She also had several small dogs: Bellman once wrote a poem about her 13 dogs.

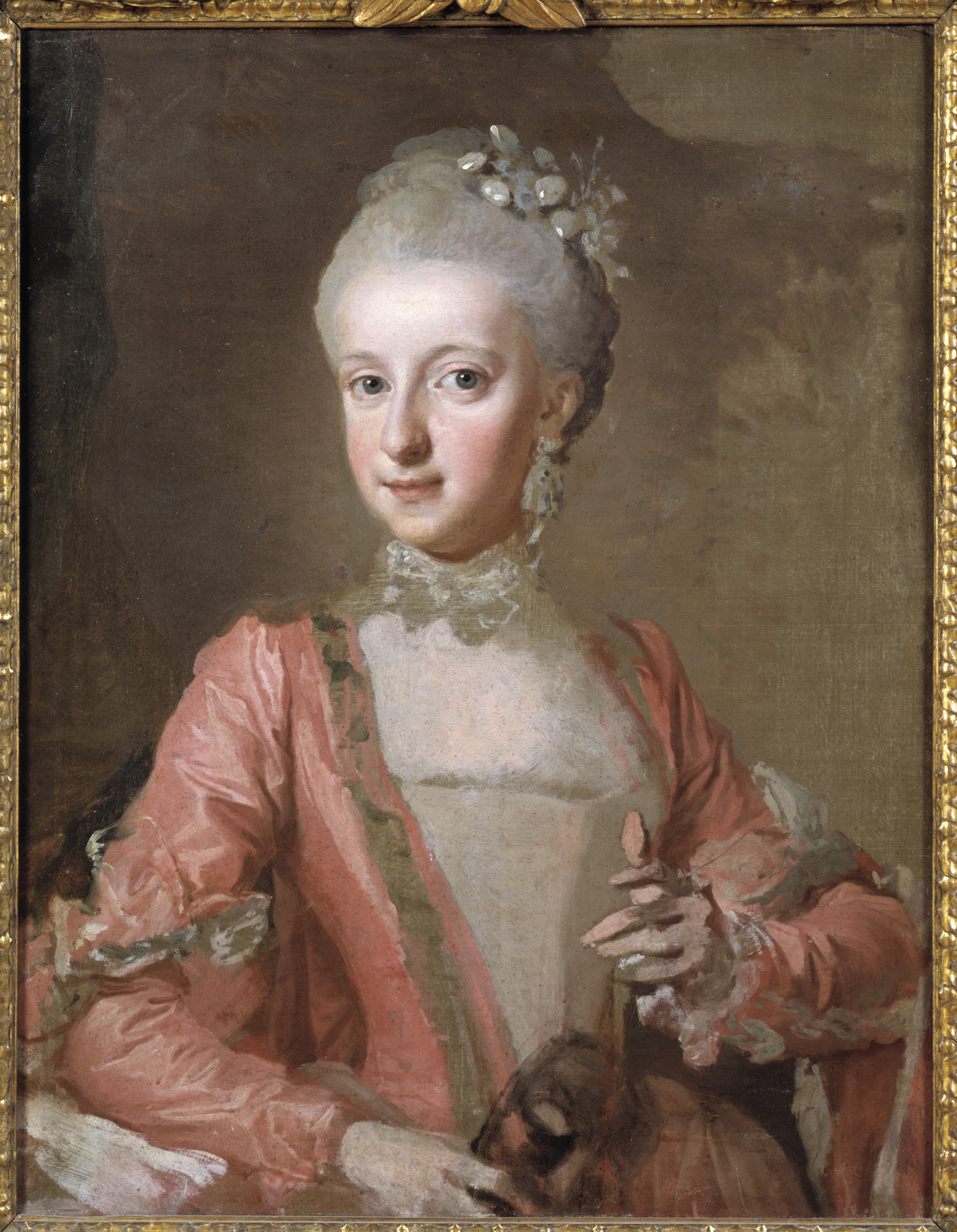
Princess Sophia Albertina of Sweden, by Lorens Pasch The Younger, 1768.

=== Private life ===
Early on, there were plans for a possible marriage for Sophia Albertina. She was suggested to become the second wife of Crown Prince Frederick William of Prussia in 1769 after his divorce. In 1772 her brother, King Gustav III, who lived in a childless and unconsummated marriage, had the idea of letting his younger siblings provide an heir to the throne, and both Sophia Albertina and her brother Prince Charles were considered for this task. Among the marriage partners considered for Sophia Albertina were her cousin Prince Peter of Holstein-Gottorp, Prince-Bishop of Lübeck, but these plans were abandoned in 1780. A marriage to King Stanisław August Poniatowski was also suggested, despite the religious differences, but the match was opposed by the king's sisters Ludwika Maria Poniatowska and Izabella Poniatowska, and nothing came of it.

Sophia Albertina was sometimes called The Princess with the ice heart. However, it was common knowledge in Stockholm that she was not exempt from having a love life. There were well-known and persistent rumours that Sophia Albertina gave birth to a child sometime in 1785/86. The child has sometime been said to be a son, named Peter Niklas, or a daughter, named Sophia after herself. The place for the birth has been suggested as Allmänna Barnbördshuset, a public hospital, where women were allowed to give birth with their faces covered by a mask to preserve their anonymity.

The purported daughter was allegedly brought up by foster parents and it was arranged that she be married off to a wealthy merchant as an adult. This rumour is unconfirmed and the truth of it is unknown. The father was often identified as Count Fredrik Vilhelm von Hessenstein, son of King Frederick I of Sweden and his mistress Hedvig Taube. Another suggested father was Gustav Badin, her African foster brother, but there is no mention that the child was of mixed race. Badin and his second wife are however noted to have had a foster daughter named Christina living with them, sometime after 1784.

Fredrik Vilhelm von Hessenstein is often pointed out as the love of Sophia Albertina, and she is said to have wished to marry him, but Gustav III refused to grant his permission because the mother of Hessenstein had been a royal mistress. The intimate friend of Sophia Albertina, Caroline Rudenschöld, refers to these issues in a letter from 1792, where she mentions two love interests of Sophia Albertina. Rudenschöld mentioned that she was concerned about a confidence the Princess had given her, but that she was assured that Sophia Albertina would “do everything that is in your power to do, to overcome this unfortunate passion” and to “use your sense to overpower it”, and she ads: “I can understand that this inclination of yours is so much more unfortunate than the last one”. Ulla Möllersvärd has been rumored to be her daughter.

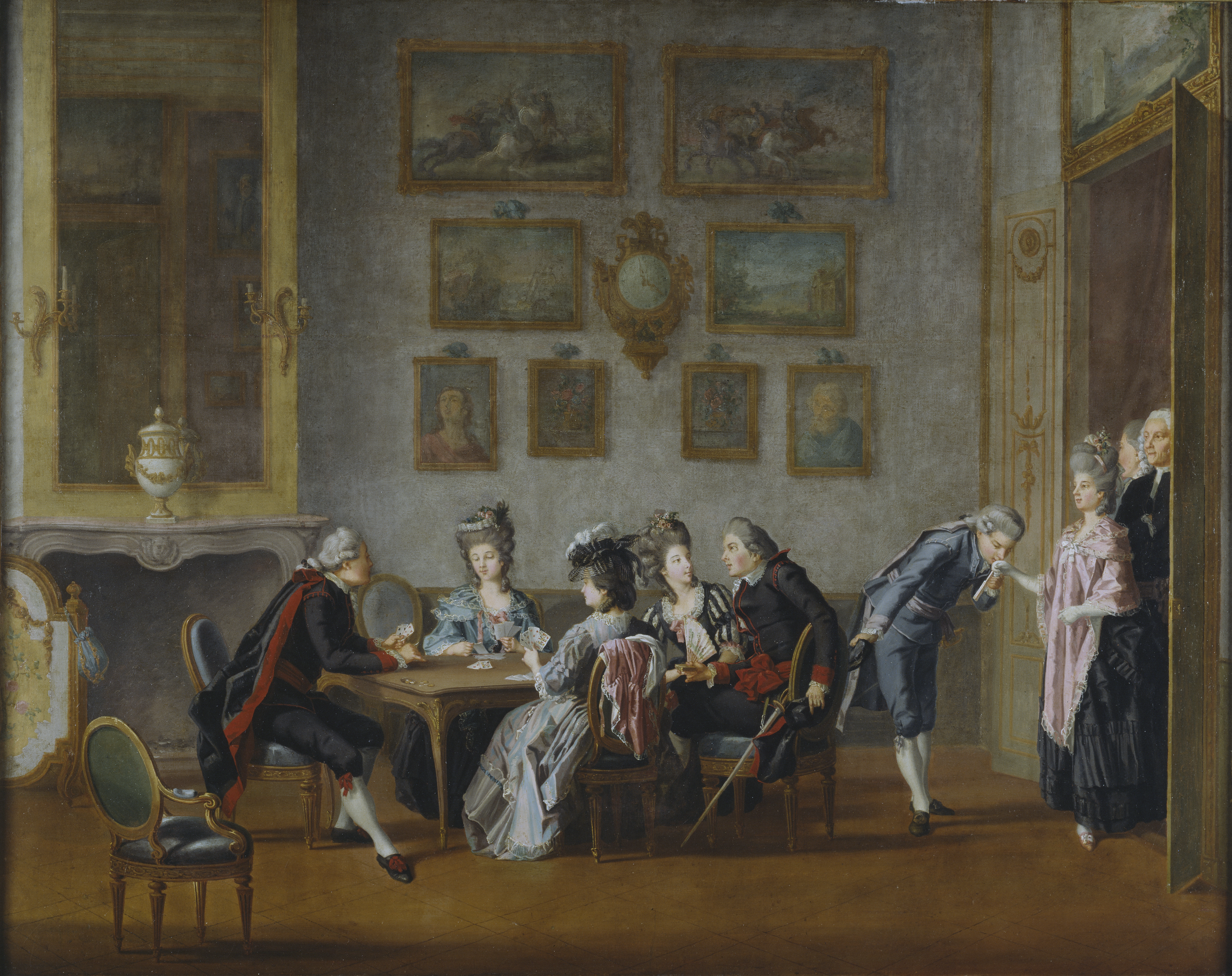
Card-Party in the Home of Elis Schröderheim by Pehr Hilleström The Elder. (On the right, Sophia Albertina entering the room).

=== Lolotte Forssberg affair ===
In 1795, the Lolotte Forssberg affair occurred, which caused considerable attention. Lolotte Forssberg was the chamber maid and foster sibling of Sophia Albertina. In 1795, an anonymous letter was found by Sophia Albertina, which pointed out Lolotte Forssberg as her secret sister. Sophia Albertina issued an investigation, and believed herself to have reasons to believe that Forssberg was indeed her sister, and therefore decided to take responsibility for her welfare and treat her officially as a sister. She believed for a time that Forssberg was her legitimate sister, whose birth her parents had reasons to hide, and therefore demanded that Lolotte Forssberg should be officially recognised. This caused a scandal, not only in Sweden, but also in Germany, where her maternal relatives, the Prussian royal family, expressed their disapproval of what they perceived as a deception of which she had been a victim. It is likely, that Lolotte Forssberg was in fact her sister, but her illegitimate half sister by her father and a lady-in waiting, Ulla von Liewen. In 1799, Sophia Albertina herself stated that Lolotte Forssberg was her illegitimate halfsister, and arranged a marriage with her courtier, Count Magus Stenbock, and had her presented at court. Gossip would later suggest, that Lolotte Forssberg was the illegitimate child of Sophia Albertina herself, but as Forssberg was born in 1766, she was evidently not the same woman as the alleged secret daughter of Sophia Albertina and Frederick Hessenstein, who had been born in 1785. Lolotte Forssberg was to remain with Sophia Albertina her entire life, and was named as her heir in her will.

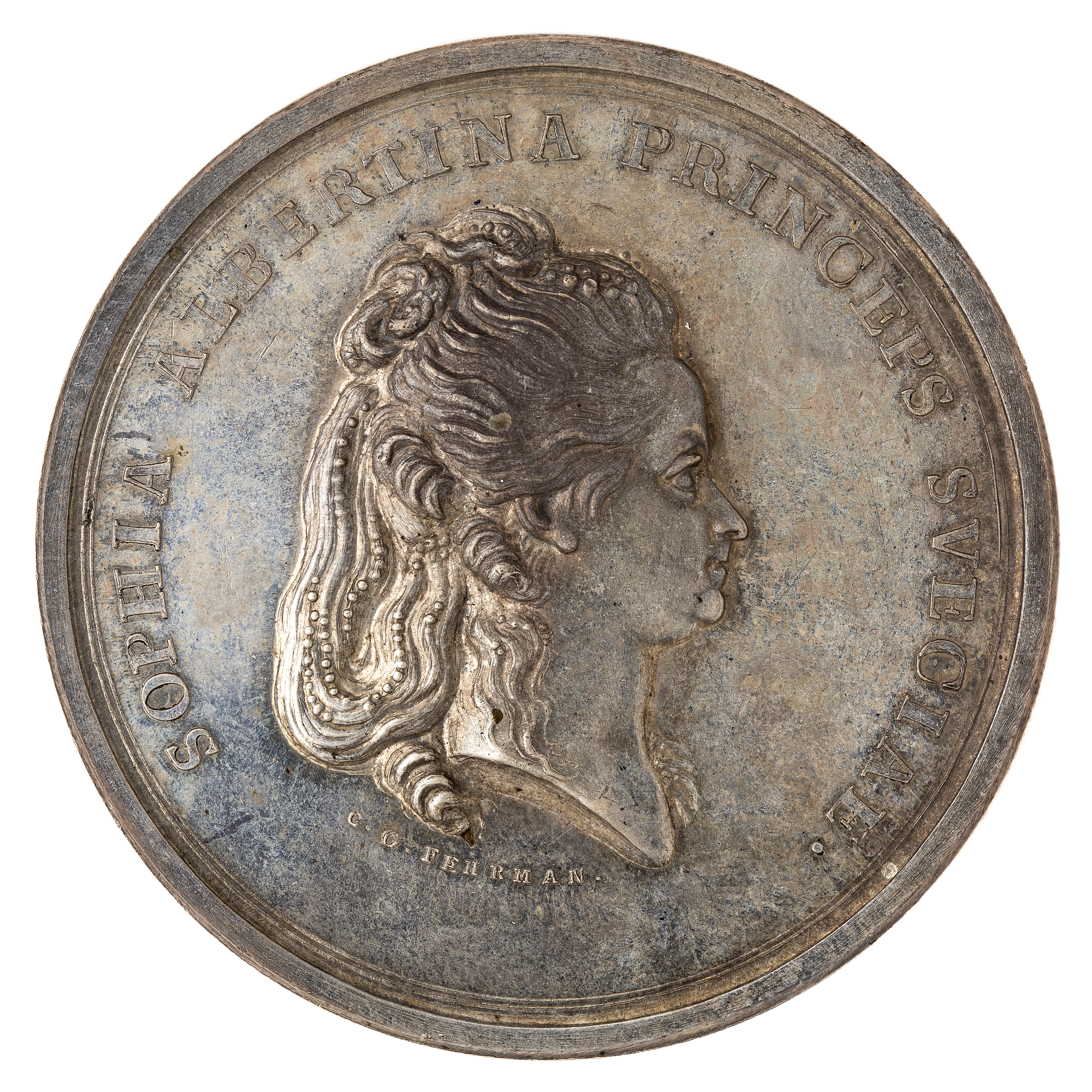
Obverse of medal with Sophia Albertina in profile, 1787.

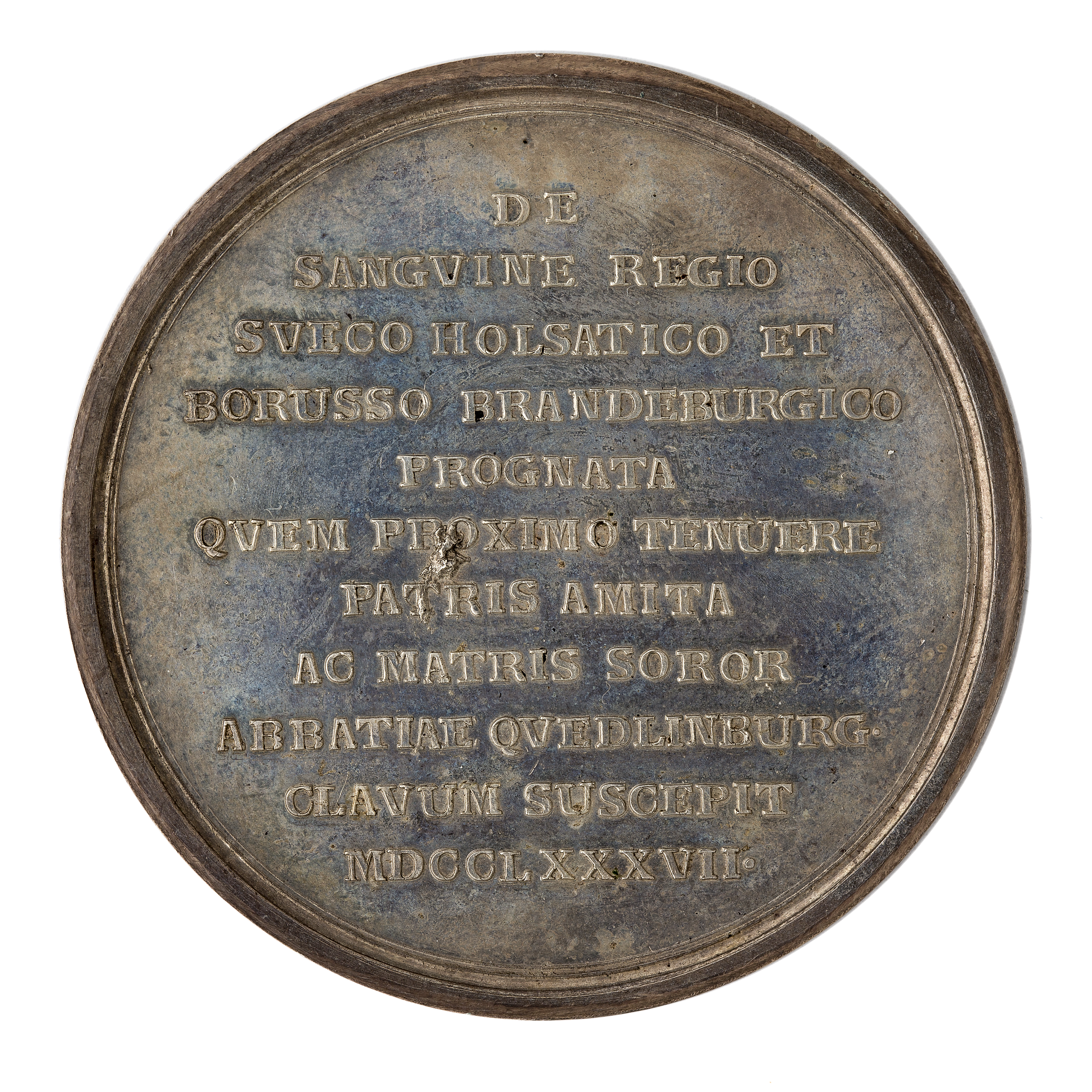
Reverse of medal, struck in 1787 upon receiving the abbessship of the diocese of Quedlinburg.

=== Reign as Princess-Abbess ===
In 1767, by the grace of her maternal uncle Frederick the Great (Frederick II of Prussia), Sophia Albertina was made Coadjutrix of Quedlinburg Abbey, a convent of Lutheran women.

In 1787, one or two years after allegedly secretly giving birth, she succeeded her maternal aunt, Anna Amalia of Prussia, as Princess-Abbess of Quedlinburg. As such, she was the reigning head of a German state directly under the Holy Roman Empire, and thus a monarch in the Empire.

When she succeeded as abbess, Frederick offered to "relieve" her from the position by buying the realm of Quedlinburg and annexing it to Prussia. She declined the offer by saying that she was sure that he was not serious. Sophia Albertina travelled to Quedlinburg in 1787, and took her oath as abbess on 15 October.

As princess-abbess, she was active in the rule of the city of Quedlinburg, and her rule has been described as a popular one. She founded schools for poor children, established the first theatre in the city, and increased the salary of the clergy. Gossip pointed out Quedlinburg as a place where noblewomen went to give birth to their illegitimate children in secret. She brought with her a court of 50 people, and often entertained guests, particularly her German relatives, during her stays at Quedlinburg. Sophia Albertina was present in Quedlinburg from 1787 to 1788, a second period from 1792 until 1795, and a third period from 1799 until 1803. She managed the affairs of the state in cooperation with her chancellor Sebastian von Moltzer.

In the German Mediatization, the state of Quedlinburg was dissolved and incorporated into Prussia. This was done after the Treaty of Lunéville, when the French First Republic allowed the German secular monarchs to annex the German church states. Sophia Albertina was simply told on 11 July 1802 that the state was now a part of Prussia and that she was thereby deprived of all political authority. She was however allowed to keep the title and income for life. She remained with her court until September 1803.

=== Last years ===
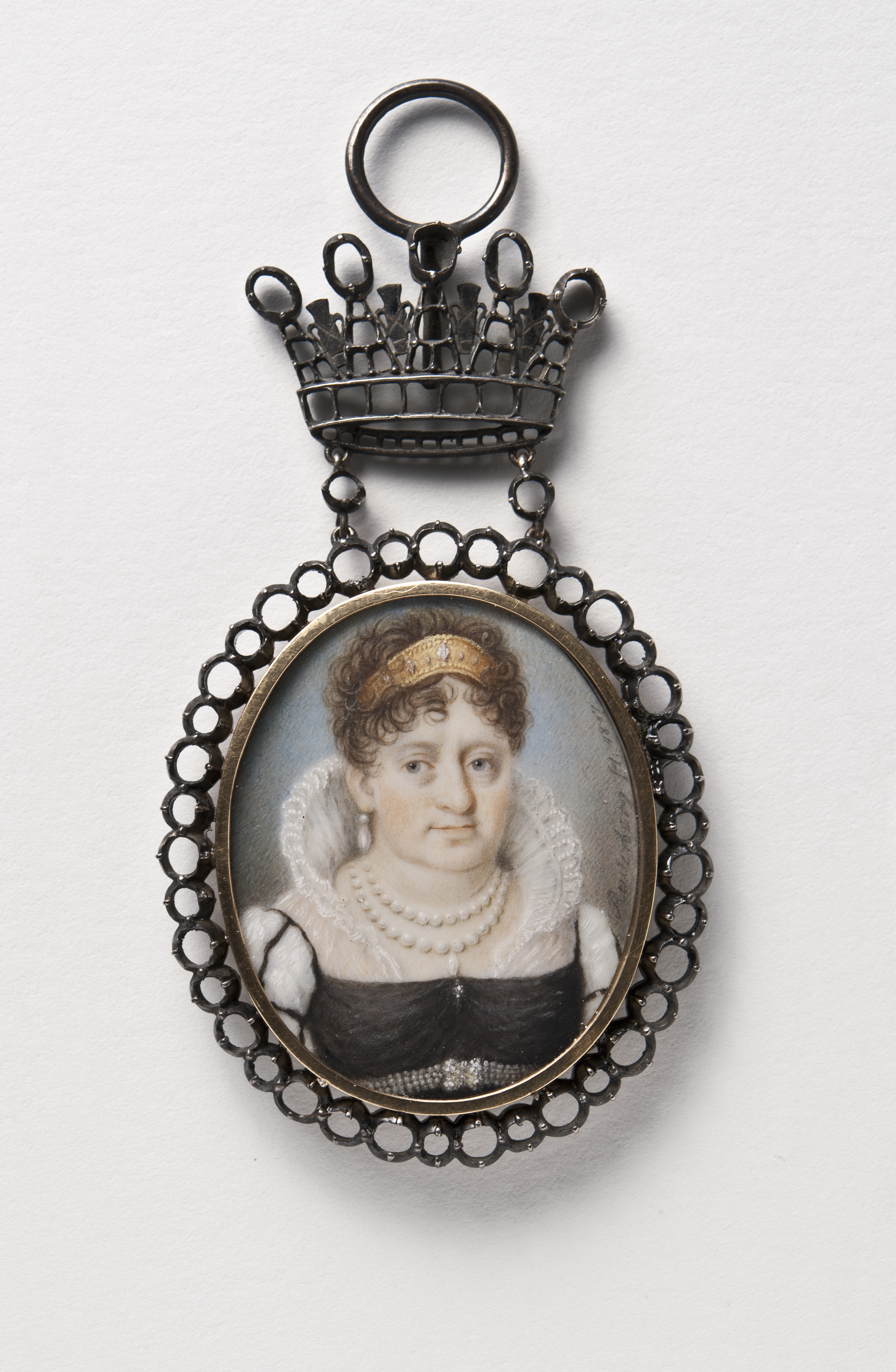
Princess Sophia Albertina by Eric Reuterborg, 1817.

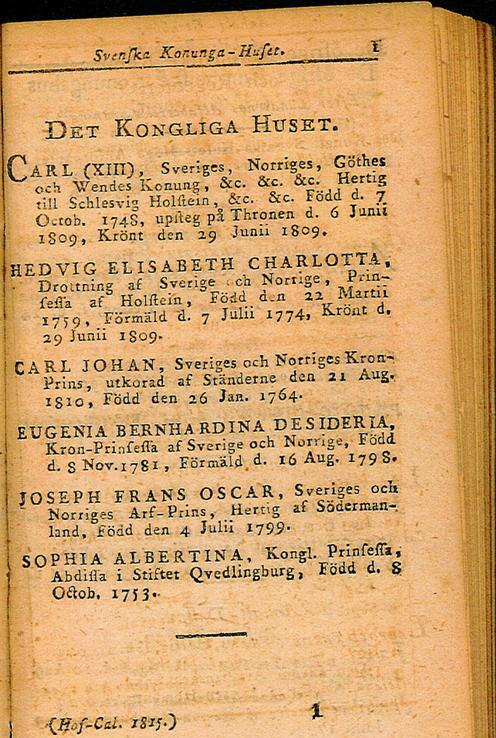
Sophia Albertina is called just Royal Princess (with no nations given) in the government list of 1815.

After the dissolution of Quedlinburg Abbey, Sophia Albertina stayed in Sweden permanently. In 1807, she was deprived of her income from Quedlinburg when it was annexed by the newly created Kingdom of Westphalia. She wrote to Napoleon and asked him to respect her rights as he had done for Landgravine Louise of Hesse-Darmstadt (1757–1830) and Pauline of Anhalt-Bernburg, but was given no reply. During the Revolution of 1809, when her nephew Gustaf IV Adolf was deposed, she as well as her brother had refused the King's demand that they evacuate with him, and when the leaders of the coup entered Stockholm, she reportedly greeted Georg Adlersparre with her handkerchief from her balcony. She then participated in the coronation of her brother as Charles XIII.

She was not close to the elected heir, Charles August of Augustenburg, because he did not like the company of women. He did, however, offer her the position of abbess at the Danish Vallø stift, after the 1809 government had cancelled her pension and the allowance from Quedlinburg had become irregular, but she declined the offer. During the reign of her brother Charles XIII (r. 1809–1818), she seldom appeared at court, because he did not like Lolotte Forssberg, whose influence over Sophia Albertina was said to dominate her last years.

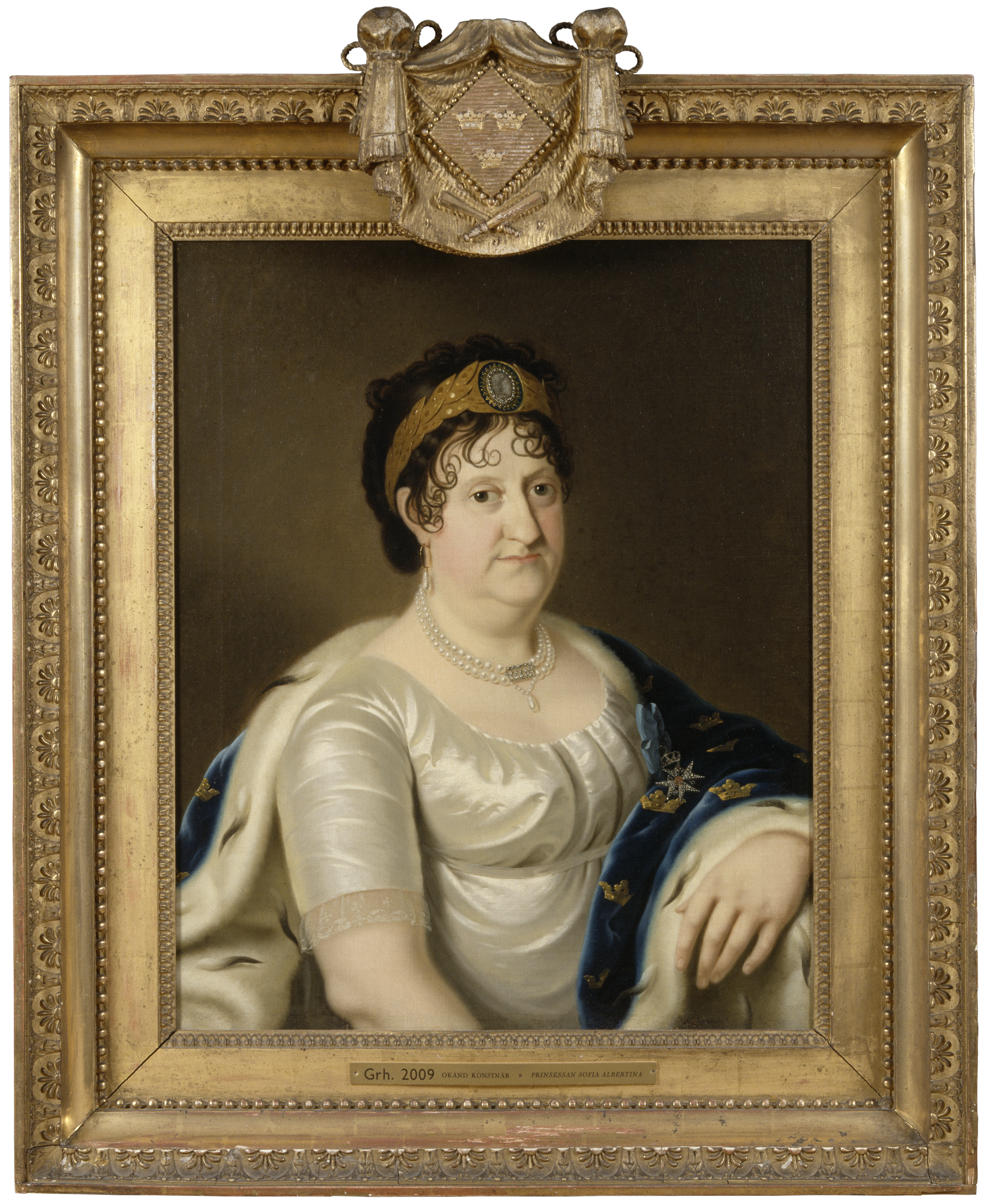
Sophia Albertina in the later part of her life, the frame bears the Three Crowns of Sweden and the coat of arms of the Diocese of Quedlinburg. She also wears a brilliant-studded badge on her chest with the coat of arms of the Diocese of Quedlinburg. Over her shoulder she wears a princely ermine cloak in blue.

Like her brother and sister-in-law, Sophia Albertina was reportedly charmed by the new elected heir, Charles John Bernadotte. As Bernadotte was very eager to legitimize himself in the eyes of the public, he made every effort to show her affection. In 1812, when Bernadotte banned all contact with the deposed royal family and all objects which could be a reminder of them, she as well as her sister-in-law decided to stop corresponding with former Queen Frederica on their own initiative. However, at her death, it was discovered that she had kept many objects with connection to the deposed King in a locked space in her palace. After the death of her sister-in-law in 1818 and during the first years of the reign of Charles XIV John, she acted as the first lady of the royal court until 1823, when the estranged spouse of Charles John, Désirée Clary, returned to Sweden. In 1819, she founded the charitable society Välgörande fruntimmerssällskapet.

During her last years, she spent much time with the Crown Prince couple. She was well aware of her position as the last member of the former dynasty, and this was also used by Charles XIV John, who was very eager that she should be present at all official occasions, in his attempt to legitimize his own new dynasty: Sophia Albertina was therefore asked to participate in representation frequently during the reign of Charles John. At the wedding of the Crown Prince in Stockholm in 1823, she placed the bridal crown on the head of Josephine of Leuchtenberg, and in 1826, she was a witness of the birth of the future King Charles XV of Sweden, and had the task to inform the King of the birth and the sex of the newborn. She participated in the ceremonies of the royal court until her death, and was often referred to as the Vasa Princess.

== Legacy ==
The main church in Landskrona, Sofia Albertina Church, opened in 1788, is named after her.

== Ancestry ==
Ancestors of Sophia Albertina, Abbess of Quedlinburg

16. Frederick III, Duke of Holstein-Gottorp
8. Christian Albert, Duke of Holstein-Gottorp
17. Marie Elisabeth of Saxony
4. Christian August of Holstein-Gottorp, Prince of Eutin
18. Frederick III of Denmark
9. Princess Frederica Amalia of Denmark
19. Sophie Amalie of Brunswick-Lüneburg
2. Adolf Frederick of Sweden
20. Friedrich VI, Margrave of Baden-Durlach
10. Frederick VII, Margrave of Baden-Durlach
21. Christina Magdalena of the Palatinate-Zweibrücken
5. Margravine Albertina Frederica of Baden-Durlach
22. Frederick III, Duke of Holstein-Gottorp (= 16)
11. Augusta Marie of Holstein-Gottorp
23. Marie Elisabeth of Saxony (= 17)
1. Princess Sofia Albertina of Sweden
24. Frederick William, Elector of Brandenburg
12. Frederick I of Prussia
25. Countess Louise Henriette of Nassau
6. Frederick William I of Prussia
26. Ernest Augustus, Elector of Hanover
13. Sophia Charlotte of Hanover
27. Countess Sophia of the Palatine
3. Louisa Ulrika of Prussia
28. Ernest Augustus, Elector of Hanover (= 26)
14. George I of Great Britain
29. Princess Sophia of the Palatine (= 27)
7. Sophia Dorothea of Hanover
30. George William, Duke of Brunswick-Lüneburg
15. Sophia Dorothea of Celle
31. Eleonore d'Esmier d'Olbreuse

Regnal titles
Preceded by Anna Amalia	Princess-Abbess of Quedlinburg; 1787–1803	German Mediatisation
