= Adolf Frederick of Sweden =

King of Sweden from 1751 to 1771

Adolf Frederick
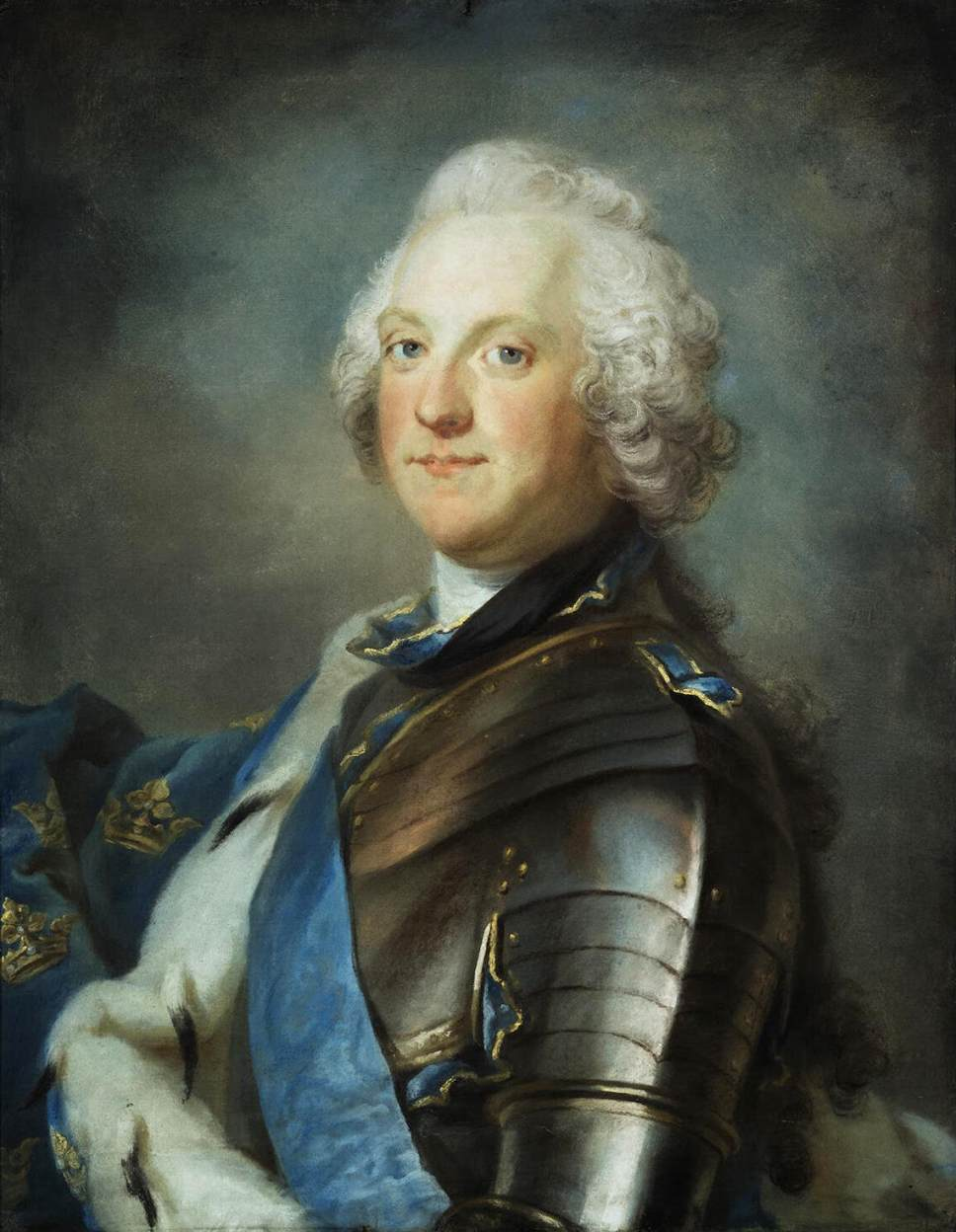
- Portrait of Adolf Frederick by Gustaf Lundberg, c. 1750.

King of Sweden
- Reign: 25 March 1751 – 12 February 1771
- Coronation: 26 November 1751
- Predecessor: Frederick I
- Successor: Gustav III

Prince-Bishop of Lübeck
- Reign: 1727 – 1750
- Predecessor: Charles August
- Successor: Frederick August
- Born: 14 May 1710; Gottorp, Schleswig, Duchy of Schleswig
- Died: 12 February 1771 (aged 60); Stockholm Palace, Stockholm, Sweden
- Burial: 30 July 1771; Riddarholm Church, Stockholm, Sweden
- Spouse: Louisa Ulrika of Prussia (m. 1744)
- Issue: Gustav III of Sweden; Charles XIII of Sweden; Prince Frederick Adolf, Duke of Östergötland; Sophia Albertina, Abbess of Quedlinburg
- House: Holstein-Gottorp (Note: From 1751, the monarch belonged to the Swedish branch of the dynasty.)
- Father: Christian August of Holstein-Gottorp, Prince of Eutin
- Mother: Princess Albertina Frederica of Baden-Durlach
- Religion: Lutheranism

Adolf (or Adolph) Frederick (Swedish: Adolf Fredrik; German: Adolf Friedrich; 14 May 1710 – 12 February 1771) was King of Sweden from 1751 until his death in 1771. He was the son of Christian August of Holstein-Gottorp, Prince of Eutin, and Albertina Frederica of Baden-Durlach. He was an uncle of Catherine the Great and husband to Louisa Ulrika of Prussia.

After 220 years, the House of Oldenburg returned to the Swedish throne with Adolf Frederick through its Holstein-Gottorp branch. He was a weak monarch, installed as first in line to the throne following the parliamentary government's failure to reconquer the Baltic provinces in 1741–1743. Aside from a few attempts, supported by pro-absolutist factions among the nobility, to reclaim the absolute monarchy held by previous monarchs, he remained a mere constitutional figurehead until his death.

His reign saw an extended period of internal peace. However, the finances stagnated following failed mercantilist doctrines pursued by the Hat administration. The Hat administration ended during the 1765–1766 parliament, where the Cap opposition took over the government and enacted reforms towards greater economic liberalism, as well as a Freedom of Press Act. The Freedom of Press Act is unique for the time for its curtailing of all censorship, retaining punitive measures only for libeling the monarch or the Church of Sweden.

== Birth and background ==
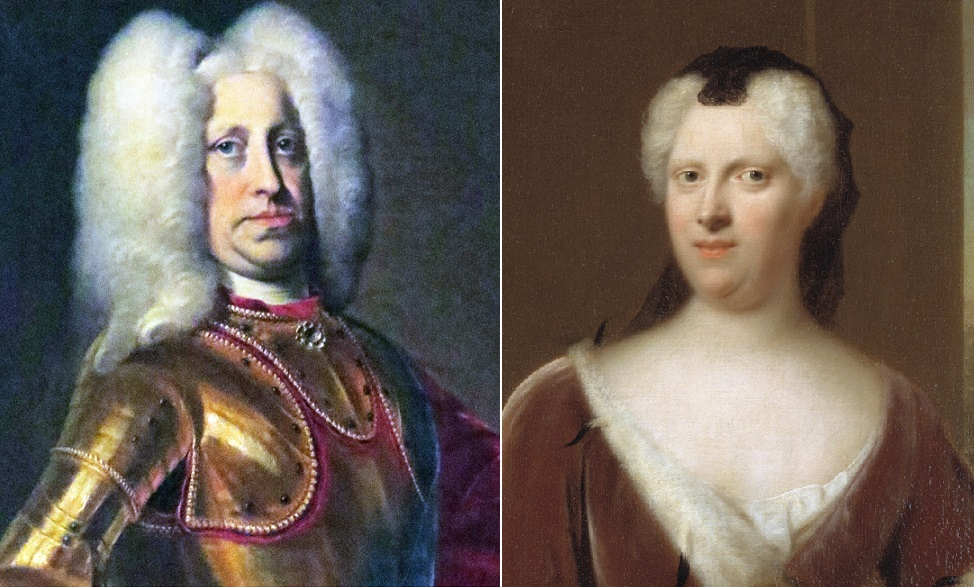
Adolf Frederick's parents, Christian August and Albertina Frederica.

A scion of a junior line of the House of Holstein-Gottorp, Adolf Frederick was born on 14 May 1710 at Gottorf Castle, near the town of Schleswig in the Duchy of Schleswig.

His father, Christian August of Holstein-Gottorp (1673–1726), was a younger son of Christian Albert, Duke of Holstein-Gottorp, and had been the Protestant Prince-Bishop of Lübeck since 1705. During the Great Northern War, the father also acted as administrator of the duchies of Holstein-Gottorp for his nephew, the underage Duke Charles Frederick.

His mother, Albertina Frederica of Baden-Durlach (1682–1755), was a descendant of earlier royal dynasties of Sweden, great-granddaughter of Princess Catherine of Sweden, mother of King Charles X of Sweden. On his mother's side, Adolf Frederick was also descended from King Gustav Vasa through Christina Magdalena, a sister of Charles X of Sweden. At his baptism, King Charles XII of Sweden, who had been invited to be his godfather, sent him a letter of authorization for a position as an officer in the Swedish army.

== Years in Holstein ==
From 1727 to 1750 Prince Adolf Frederick was the prince-bishop of Lübeck. This meant he ruled a fief around and including Eutin. After his first cousin, Charles Frederick, Duke of Holstein-Gottorp, died in 1739, Adolf Frederick became the administrator of Holstein-Kiel during the minority of the duke's orphan son, Charles Peter Ulrich. Shortly afterward, the young boy was invited to Russia by his maternal aunt, Empress Elizabeth, who soon declared him her heir. He later became known as Peter III of Russia.

== King of Sweden ==
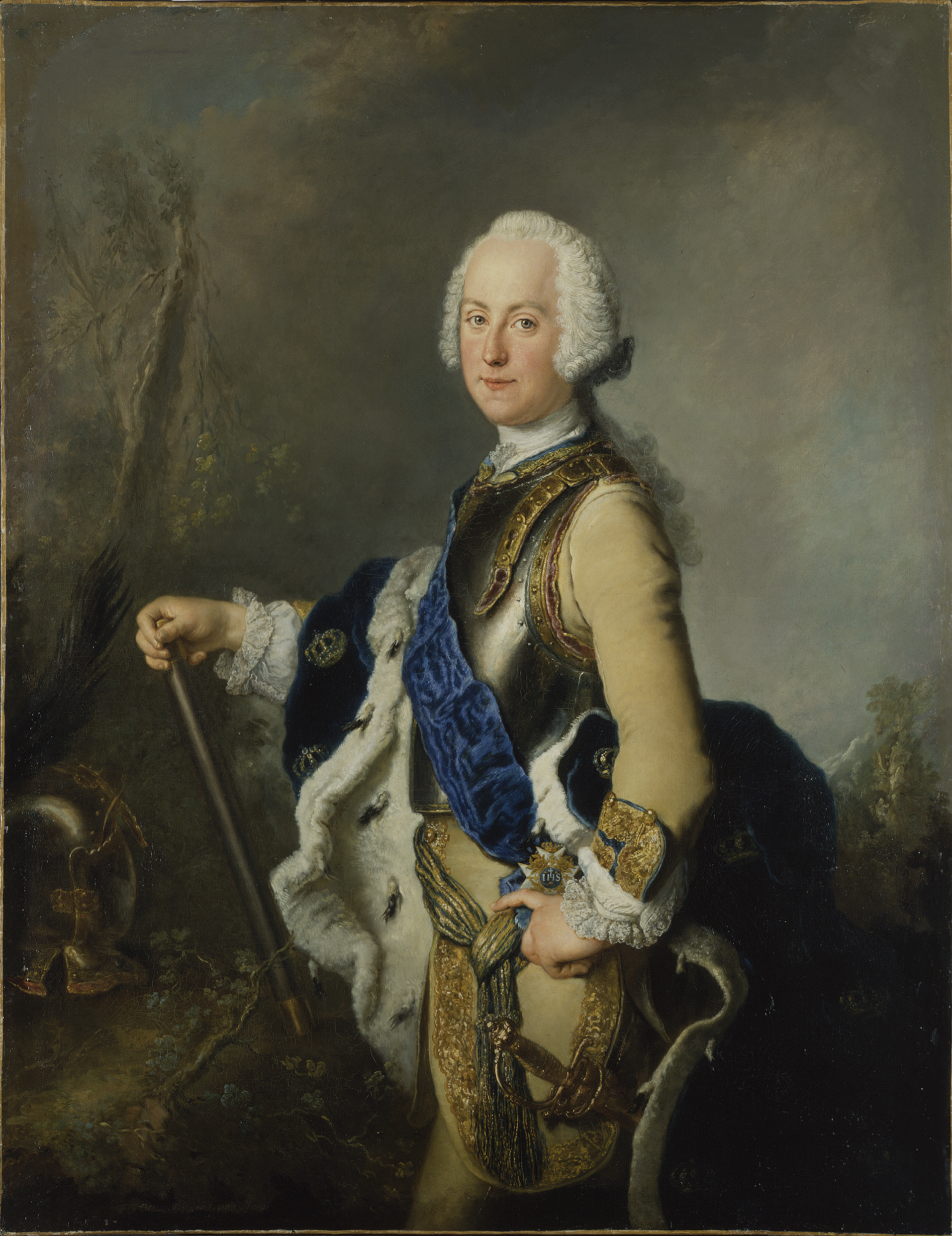
Adolf Frederick as heir to the Swedish throne wearing the uniform of the Drabant Corps, armor, a princely mantle in blue and the sash of the Order of the Seraphim. Portrait by Antoine Pesne, c. 1743.

In 1743, Adolf Frederick was elected heir to the throne of Sweden by the Hat faction (Swedish: Hattarna). The Hat faction wanted to obtain better conditions at the Treaty of Åbo from Empress Elizabeth. The following year, Adolf Frederick married Princess Louisa Ulrika of Prussia who was the sister of Frederick the Great of Prussia.

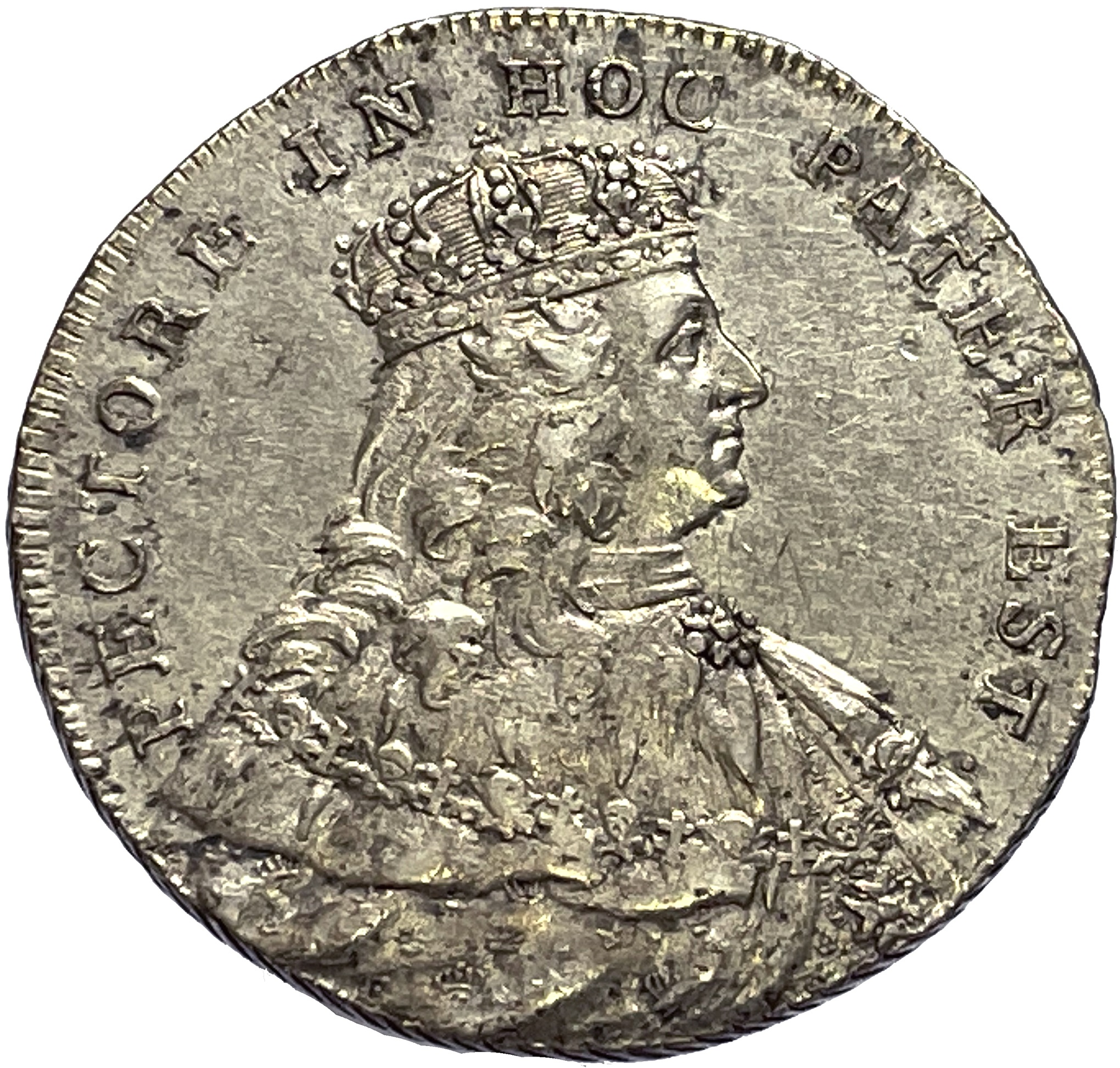
Coronation medal of King Adolf Frederick of Sweden from 1751.

Upon the death of King Frederick I of Sweden on 25 March 1751, Adolf Frederick succeeded to the Swedish throne as the first king from the House of Holstein-Gottorp. His coronation was celebrated on 26 November 1751 in the Stockholm Cathedral.

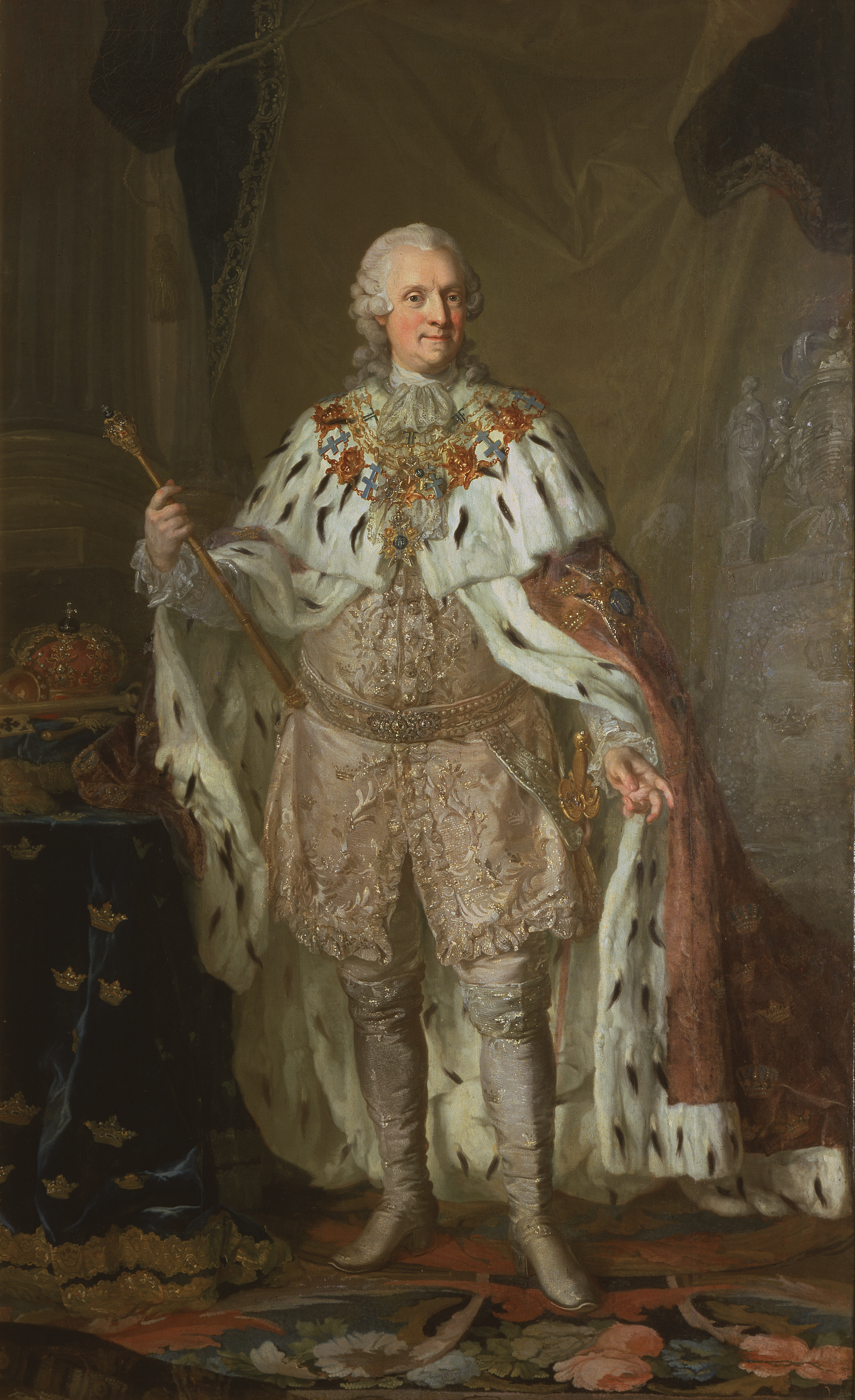
Portrait of Adolf Frederick wearing his coronation robes, on the left the regalia is visible and on the right the Silver Throne. Portrait by Lorens Pasch the Younger.

During his 20-year reign, Adolf Frederick was little more than a figurehead, the real power being with the Riksdag of the Estates, often distracted by party strife. Twice he endeavored to free himself from the tutelage of the estates. The first occasion was in 1756. Stimulated by his consort, Queen Louisa Ulrika, he tried to regain a portion of the attenuated prerogative through the Coup of 1756 to abolish the rule of the Riksdag of the Estates and reinstate absolute monarchy in Sweden. He nearly lost his throne in consequence. On the second occasion during the December Crisis of 1768, under the guidance of his eldest son, Gustav, he succeeded in overthrowing the "Cap" (Swedish: Mössorna) senate, but was unable to make any use of his victory.

== Death ==
Adolf Frederick died suddenly in Stockholm on 12 February 1771 with symptoms resembling either heart failure or poisoning. Popular stories about his death having resulted from a large meal (he had lobster, caviar, sauerkraut, kippers, champagne, and 14 helpings of his favourite dessert hetvägg of semla pastries and hot milk) are considered propaganda by modern writers.

Following his death, his son Gustav III seized power in 1772 in a military coup d'état, reinstating absolute rule.

== Legacy ==
The King was regarded as dependent on others, a weak ruler, and lacking of any talents as a statesman. However, he was allegedly a good husband, a caring father, and a gentle master to his servants. He was scientifically talented and especially interested in astronomy. He also had talent in military matters and in music. His favourite pastime was woodworking, especially to make snuffboxes, which he reportedly spent a great deal of time doing. His hospitality and friendliness were witnessed by many who deeply mourned him at his death.

== Children ==
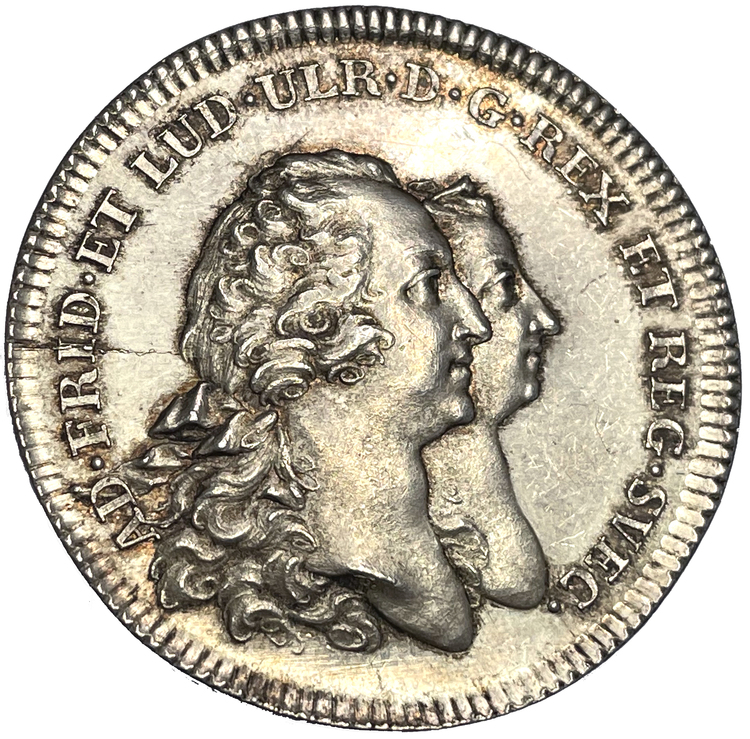
Medal of the king and queen 1762

By his marriage to Princess Louisa Ulrika of Prussia (which took place on 18 August/29 August 1744 in Drottningholm), he had five children:

1. (Stillborn) (18 February 1745 in Stockholm)
2. Gustav III (1746–1792)
3. Charles XIII (1748–1818)
4. Frederick Adolf (1750–1803)
5. Sofia Albertina (1753–1829)

With Jeanne Du Londel he had one son:

- Adolf Fredriksson (c. 1734-1771), Captain in the Swedish Army.

With Marguerite Morel he had one son who died as a child:

- Frederici (c. 1761 - 1771)

Adolf Frederick may have been the father of Lolotte Forssberg by Ulla von Liewen, but this has never been confirmed.

== Ancestors ==
Ancestors of Adolf Frederick of Sweden

8. Frederick III, Duke of Holstein-Gottorp (=14)
4. Christian Albert, Duke of Holstein-Gottorp
9. Marie Elisabeth of Saxony (=15)
2. Christian August of Holstein-Gottorp, Prince of Eutin
10. Frederick III of Denmark
5. Frederikke Amalie of Denmark
11. Sophie Amalie of Brunswick-Lüneburg
1. Adolf Frederick of Sweden
12. Frederick VI, Margrave of Baden-Durlach
6. Frederick VII, Margrave of Baden-Durlach
13. Christina Magdalena of the Palatinate-Zweibrücken
3. Albertina Frederica of Baden-Durlach
14. Frederick III, Duke of Holstein-Gottorp (=8)
7. Augusta Marie of Holstein-Gottorp
15. Marie Elisabeth of Saxony (=9)

== Bibliography ==
- Jansen, Karl (1875). "Adolf Friedrich (Herzog von Holstein-Gottorf)" . Allgemeine Deutsche Biographie (in German). Vol. 1. Leipzig: Duncker & Humblot. pp. 114–115.
- Mäntylä, Ilkka & Wolff, Charlotta (2008). "Adolf Fredrik". Biografiskt lexikon för Finland (in Swedish). Helsingfors: Svenska litteratursällskapet i Finland. urn:NBN:fi:sls-4046-1416928956652.
- Stavenow, Ludvig (1918). "Adolf Fredrik". Svenskt biografiskt lexikon (in Swedish). Vol. 1.
- Werner, Gerhart (1953). "Adolf Friedrich (Fredrik)". Neue Deutsche Biographie (in German). Vol. 1. Berlin: Duncker & Humblot. pp. 79–80. (full text online).

Adolf Fredrik House of Holstein-Gottorp Cadet branch of the House of Oldenburg Born: 14 May 1710 Died: 12 February 1771
Regnal titles
Preceded by Fredrik I	King of Sweden; 1751–1771	Succeeded by Gustav III
Preceded by Charles Augustus of Holstein-Gottorp	Prince-Bishop of Lübeck; 1727–1750	Succeeded by Frederick August of Oldenburg
