= USS Babette II =

Patrol vessel of the United States Navy

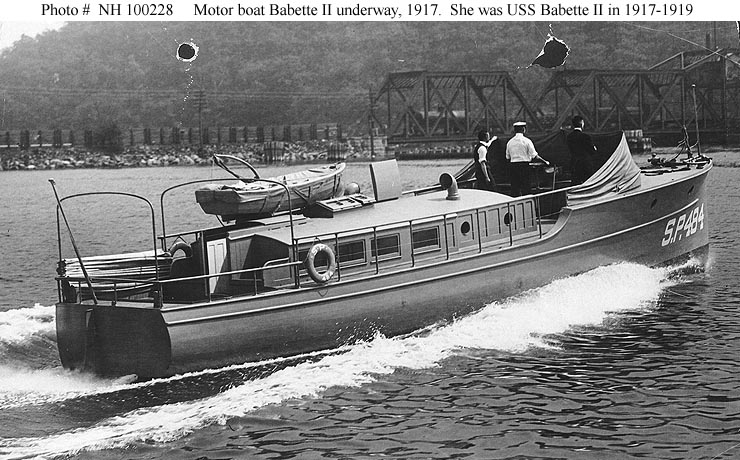
- Babette II as a private motorboat in 1917, probably while running trials near Morris Heights, the Bronx, New York. She already bears the section patrol number "SP-484" on her bow.

History

United States
- Name: USS Babette II
- Namesake: Previous name retained
- Builder: Gas Engine and Power Company and Charles L. Seabury Company, Morris Heights, the Bronx, New York
- Completed: 1917
- Acquired: Summer 1917
- Commissioned: 25 July 1917
- Decommissioned: 17 January 1919
- Stricken: 17 January 1919
- Fate: Returned to owner 17 January 1919
- Notes: Operated as private motorboat Babette II from 1919

General characteristics
- Type: Patrol vessel
- Displacement: 11 tons
- Length: 52 ft (16 m)
- Beam: 11 ft 4 in (3.45 m)
- Draft: 3 ft (0.91 m)
- Speed: 21 miles per hour
- Complement: 6
- Armament: 1 × 1-pounder gun; 1 × machine gun

USS Babette II (SP-484), sometimes cited as USS Babbitt II, was a United States Navy patrol vessel in commission from 1917 to 1919.

Babette II was built as a private motorboat of the same name by the Gas Engine and Power Company and the Charles L. Seabury Company at Morris Heights in the Bronx, New York, for Mr. Henry Goldman of New York City, who apparently had her built with the intention of offering her to the U.S. Navy for service. Upon her completion during the summer of 1917, the U.S. Navy acquired her from Goldman under a free lease for use as a section patrol vessel during World War I. She was commissioned as USS Babette II (SP-484) on 25 July 1917.

Assigned to the 5th Naval District, Babette II served as a transportation and inspection boat, carrying inspectors to and from ships anchored in Hampton Roads, Virginia, and conducting radio and ordnance inspection work. On occasion, she was also used by the special aide to the Commandant, 5th Naval District, and by the Commander, District Forces Afloat. Babette II continued on duty until about a month after the end of hostilities in World War I.

On 15 December 1918, Babette II departed Hampton Roads bound for New York City, where she simultaneously was decommissioned, returned to her owner, and presumably stricken from the Navy List on 17 January 1919.
