= Eleonora Charlotta d'Albedyhll =

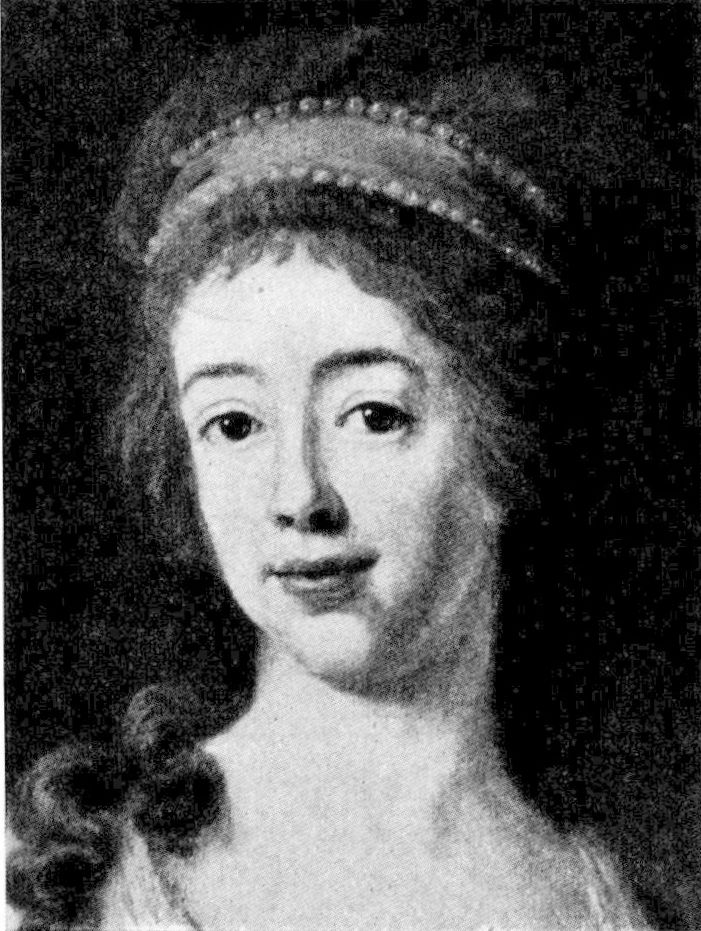
- Born: 27 March 1770; City of Stockholm
- Died: 29 May 1835 (aged 65); City of Stockholm
- Occupation: Writer, salonnière, poet
- Spouse(s): Gustaf d'Albedyhll

Eleonora Charlotta d'Albedyhll (née Wrangel; 27 March 1770 – 4 June 1835) was a Swedish countess, poet and salon holder. She hosted a literary salon in Uppsala from 1812 to 1835 and has been described as the center of the salon in Uppsala during the Romantic era. She is known as the patron of Per Daniel Amadeus Atterbom, who greatly admired her, and as one of the earliest supporters of the Fosforisterna, a group of romantic poets in Uppsala.

== Life ==
D'Albedyhll was born in Stockholm, the daughter of riksråd count Anders Reinhold Wrangel and Eleonora Mariana Barnekow. In 1795, she married baron Gustaf d'Albedyhll and moved to Nyköping. Her marriage was described as happy. Already during her early years, she was known to be intelligent, educated and a talented intellectual, and she was also described as a beauty.

In 1812, d'Albedyhll and her spouse moved to Uppsala. In Uppsala, she founded a literary salon and became a center of the cultural life in the city, rivaling Malla Silfverstolpe. Originally a believer of academic sense, she became the patron of the circle of Romantic poets known as Fosforisterna, which is described as the breakthrough of the Romantic style in the contemporary high society.

She was the benefactor of Per Daniel Amadeus Atterbom, who was also her personal admirer and describes her:

"She is about forty, strongly built, with a proud composure, a majestic profile, who resembles that of Queen Louisa Ulrika; big, dark and shining eyes and black hair, which falls in many curls from her forehead. The larger part of the day she spends on reading or painting; when she is resting, she normally walks around in her cabinet with her zither hanging from her shoulder, and when her fingers travels across the strings, she truly looks like a song goddess...Among other things, she can perform almost ever part and mimic all people; in particular, she impersonates Gustav III excellently. The women in this city greatly fear her much and complains about her satirical tongue, though she does in fact judge them much more lightly than they her."

== Works ==
In 1789, d'Albedyhll wrote the poem Jacobinen in dedication to Anna Maria Lenngren. In 1807, she is known to have completed the novel Ludvig von Mansfeldt, though it was not published.

From 1810 onward, d'Albedyhll had her poems published in publications such as the Lunds Veckoblad, Journal för Litteraturen och Theatern and Poetiska kalender. Her most known poem was the Gefion, skaldedikt i fyra sånger, a poem inspired by the Norse mythology, which was published in 1814. She wrote under the name "Ch. Wr."

== See also ==
- Henrik Otto Albedyll

== Sources ==
- Eleonora Charlotta d'Albedyhll (f. Wrangel), urn:sbl:17211, Svenskt biografiskt lexikon (art av O. WlESELGREN.), hämtad 2014-01-02.
