= Babette Cochois =

French writer and ballerina

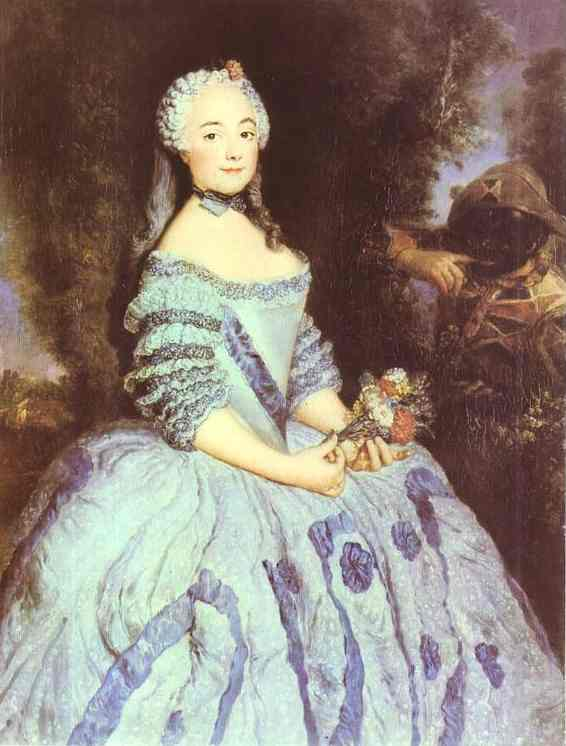
- Cochois by Antoine Pesne
- Born: 1723
- Died: 1780 (aged 56–57)
- Occupations: Ballerina, writer
- Spouse: Jean-Baptiste de Boyer, Marquis d'Argens
- Children: Barbe (daughter

Babette Cochois (1723-1780), also known as Babet Cochois and Barbe Cochois, was a French ballerina and writer, active in Prussia. Her parentage is unknown. She was the sister of the ballerina Marianne Cochois and the second cousin of Marie Sallé.

She was engaged at the French Royal Court Theatre of Frederick the Great in Prussia between 1743 and 1749. She was considered a leading artist, and was given the rare privilege by the king to reside in Charlottenburg Palace. In 1743, when the Berlin Opera was inaugurated, she made her debut there.

In 1749 she married the French writer Jean-Baptiste de Boyer, Marquis d'Argens. She retired as a ballerina, but became active as a writer.

She has been the subject of poems and a famous painting by Antoine Pesne.

Works

- Mémoires pour servir à l'histoire de l'esprit et du cœur, 1744
- Nouveaux mémoires pour servir à l'histoire de l'esprit et du coeur, 1745
- Histoire de l'esprit et du coeur, 1755
- Histoire de l'esprit humain, 1765
