= Prince Georg Ludwig of Holstein-Gottorp =

Imperial Russian Field Marshal

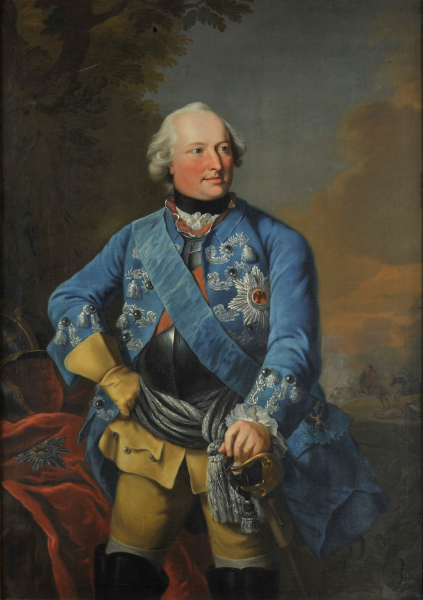
- Portrait of Georg Ludwig of Holstein-Gottorp by Johann Heinrich Tischbein, c. 1760
- Born: 16 March 1719; Hamburg
- Died: 7 September 1763 (aged 44); Kiel, Duchy of Schleswig-Holstein-Gottorp, Holy Roman Empire
- Spouse: Princess Sophie Charlotte of Schleswig-Holstein-Sonderburg-Beck (m. 1750; died 1763)
- Issue: Friedrich; Wilhelm; Peter I, Grand Duke of Oldenburg
- House: House of Holstein-Gottorp
- Father: Christian August of Holstein-Gottorp, Prince of Eutin
- Mother: Princess Albertina Frederica of Baden-Durlach

Prince Georg Ludwig of Holstein-Gottorp (16 March 1719 – 7 September 1763) was a Prussian lieutenant-general and an Imperial Russian field marshal.

He was the youngest son of Christian August of Holstein-Gottorp, Prince of Eutin and his wife Albertina Frederica of Baden-Durlach. He joined the Prussian army in 1741 and was appointed major general in 1744. In the Seven Years' War, he served under the command of Field Marshal Johann von Lehwaldt where he was promoted to lieutenant-general. In 1760 he fought in the Battle of Torgau after which he was dismissed by Frederick the Great for not being fast enough. He then served for Peter III of Russia, his first cousin once removed, and became field marshal on 21 February 1762. Due to the revolution on 4 June 1762, headed by his niece, Catherine the Great, he lost his position and returned to Kiel where he died soon after.

== Family ==
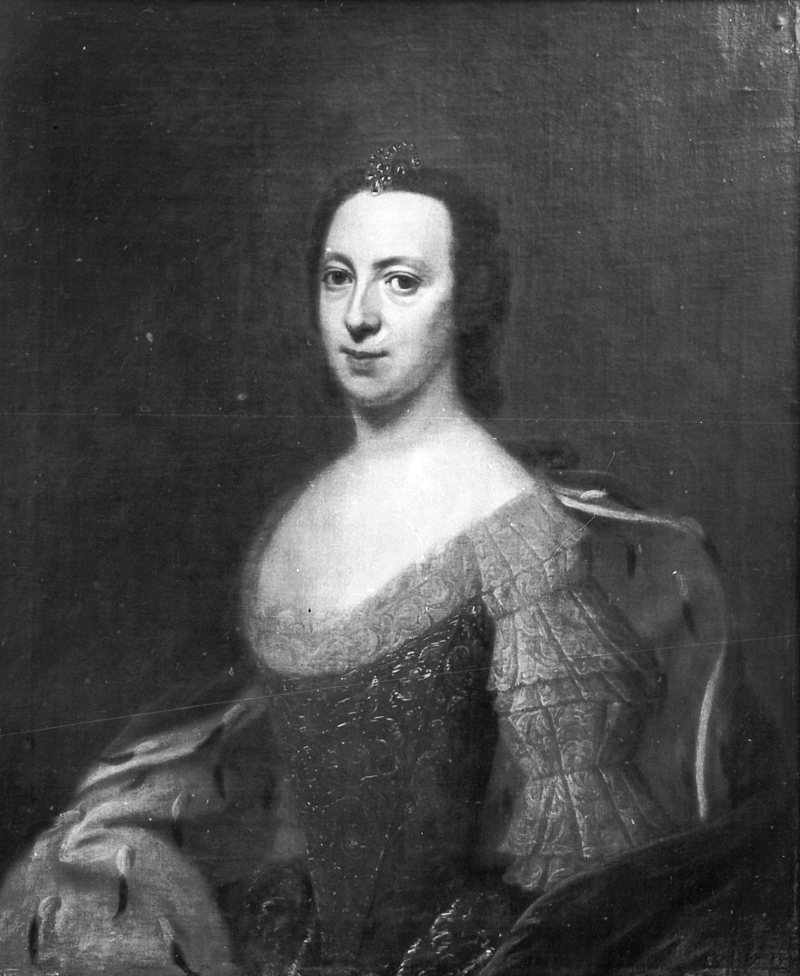
Portrait of Sophie Charlotte of Schleswig-Holstein-Sonderburg-Beck by Dominicus van der Smissen.

Georg Ludwig married Princess Sophie Charlotte of Schleswig-Holstein-Sonderburg-Beck (1722-1763) in 1750. She was the daughter of Frederick William II, Duke of Schleswig-Holstein-Sonderburg-Beck. They had three children:

- Friedrich (1751-1752), died in infancy;
- Wilhelm August of Holstein-Gottorp (1753-1772), died young, unmarried;
- Peter (1755-1829), who served as regent for his cousin before ultimately becoming Grand Duke of Oldenburg.

Sophie died on 7 August 1763, exactly one month before her husband.

== Ancestry ==
Ancestors of Prince Georg Ludwig of Holstein-Gottorp

8. Frederick III, Duke of Holstein-Gottorp (=14)
4. Christian Albert, Duke of Holstein-Gottorp
9. Marie Elisabeth of Saxony (=15)
2. Christian August of Holstein-Gottorp, Prince of Eutin
10. Frederick III of Denmark
5. Frederikke Amalie of Denmark
11. Sophie Amalie of Brunswick-Lüneburg
1. Prince Georg Ludwig of Holstein-Gottorp
12. Frederick VI, Margrave of Baden-Durlach
6. Frederick VII, Margrave of Baden-Durlach
13. Christina Magdalena of the Palatinate-Zweibrücken
3. Albertina Frederica of Baden-Durlach
14. Frederick III, Duke of Holstein-Gottorp (=8)
7. Augusta Marie of Holstein-Gottorp
15. Marie Elisabeth of Saxony (=9)
