= Duchess Joanna Elisabeth of Holstein-Gottorp =

Joanna Elisabeth of Holstein-Gottorp
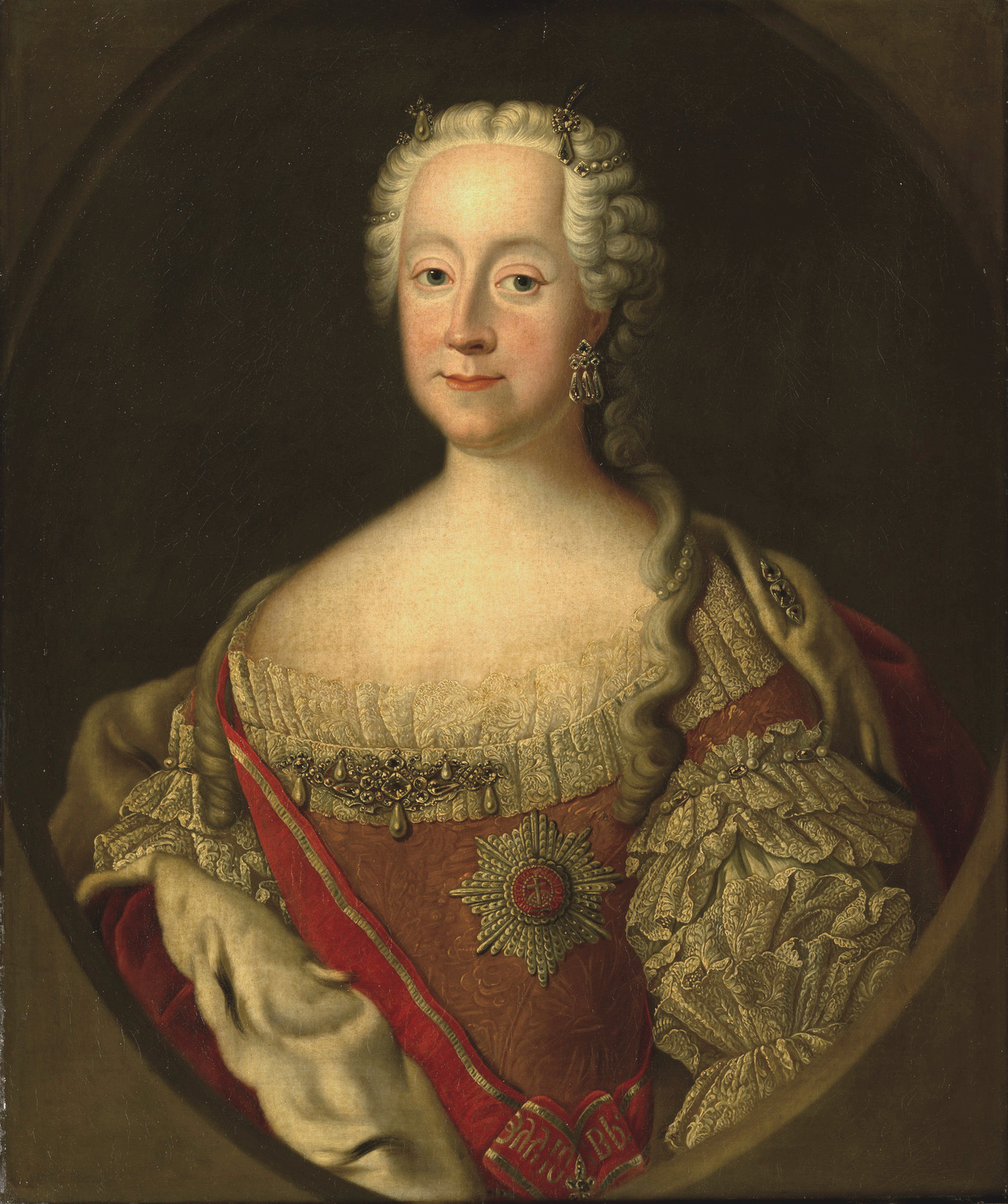
- Portrait of Joanna Elisabeth wearing the star of the Order of Saint Catherine

Princess consort of Anhalt-Zerbst
- Tenure: 7 November 1742 – 16 March 1747
- Born: 24 October 1712; Gottorp Castle, Gottorp
- Died: 30 May 1760 (aged 47); Paris, France
- Spouse: Christian August, Prince of Anhalt-Zerbst (m. 1727; died 1747)
- Issue Detail: Catherine II of Russia; Frederick Augustus, Prince of Anhalt-Zerbst
- House: Holstein-Gottorp
- Father: Christian August, Prince of Eutin
- Mother: Albertina Frederica of Baden-Durlach

Joanna Elisabeth of Holstein-Gottorp (24 October 1712 – 30 May 1760) was a member of the German House of Holstein-Gottorp, a princess consort of Anhalt-Zerbst by marriage, and the regent of Anhalt-Zerbst from 1747 to 1752 on behalf of her minor son, Frederick Augustus. She is best known as the mother of Catherine the Great.

== Early life ==
Joanna Elisabeth was born to Christian August, Duke of Holstein-Gottorp (1673–1726), Prince of Eutin and Prince-Bishop of Lübeck, and his wife, Albertina Frederica of Baden-Durlach (1682–1755), who belonged to a minor branch of the influential House of (Schleswig-Holstein-Gottorp). Since her father was not rich and had eleven children, he sent Joanna to the court of her godmother, Duchess Elisabeth Sophie Marie of Schleswig-Holstein-Sonderburg-Norburg (1683–1767), who had no children of her own. Joanna was thus brought up in one of the most luxurious courts of Northern Germany, together with the three daughters of Elisabeth Sophie Marie's husband, Augustus William, Duke of Brunswick-Wolfenbüttel (1662–1731).

On November 8, 1727, the fifteen-year-old Joanna was married to the thirty-six-year old Prince Christian August of Anhalt-Zerbst (1690–1747), an heir to the Principality of Anhalt-Zerbst and a general in the Prussian Army under Frederick William I of Prussia. After the wedding, the couple lived in the small city of Stettin, Pomerania (later known as Szczecin, Poland), where the husband's regiment was stationed.

== Princess of Anhalt-Zerbst ==
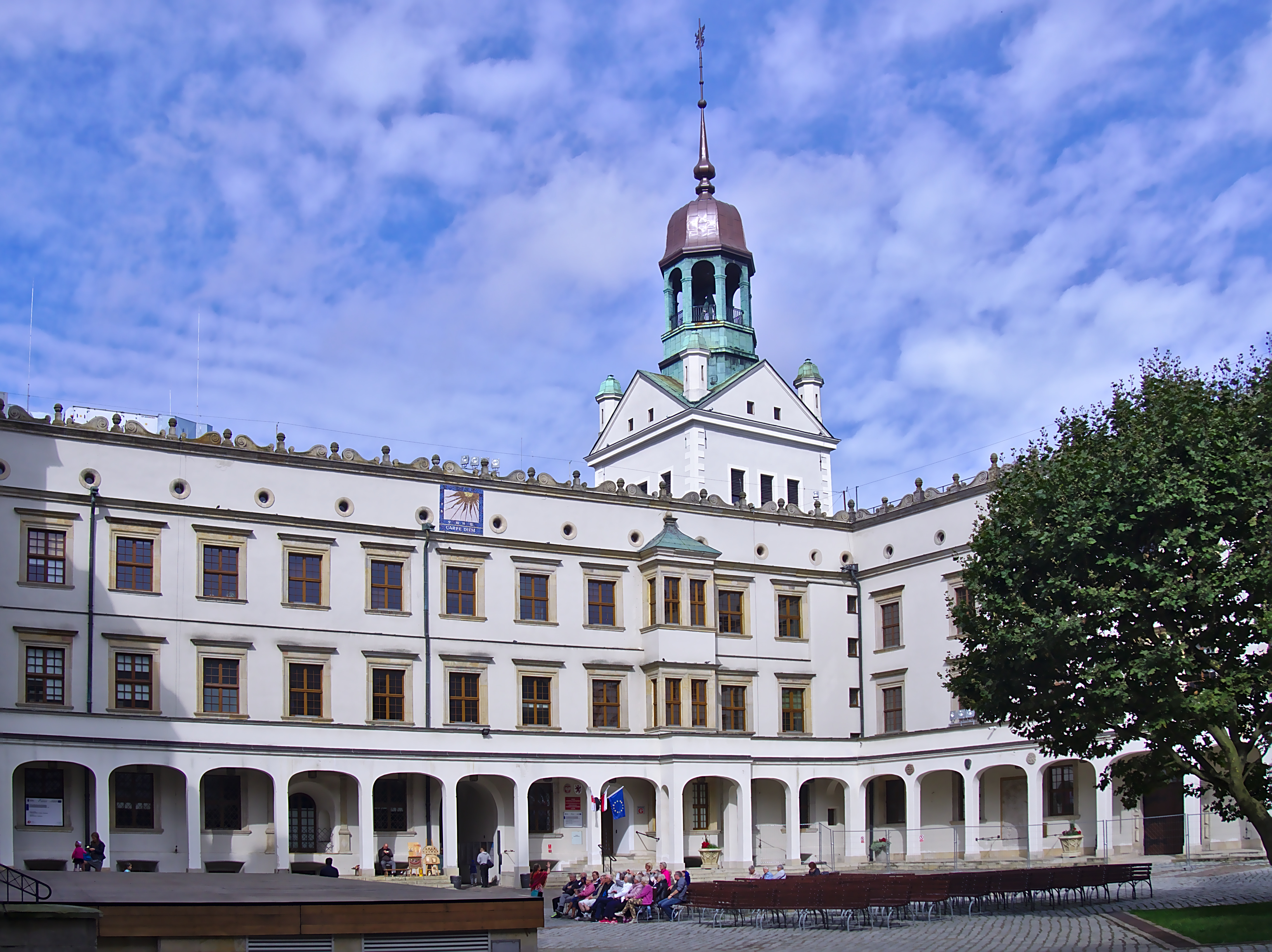
Ducal Castle in Stettin, now in Poland

The marriage of Joanna and Christian August turned out to be a mismatch because of their large age gap and different personalities. The soldier husband was a sober and simple man, used to giving orders and not talking much, while his young wife loved socializing. In addition, Christian August could only afford a small townhouse on his military pay while Joanna was used to the luxury of the ducal court of Brünswick. Compared to the life Joanna had known, which was full of balls, hunts, and theatre plays, there was little entertainment in Stettin. Joanna was unhappy but remained an obedient and dutiful wife.

On 22 January 1729, after Christian August was appointed commander of Stettin, the couple moved into the castle in the middle of the city. Joanna, who remained dissatisfied with her position and her social isolation, started travelling to escape Stettin. She often visited Brunswick, her childhood home, and every February during the carnival season she paid her respects to the King of Prussia. Much to her dismay, she was treated as a poor relative and pitied for her marriage to someone below her in rank.

On 21 April 1729, Joanna gave birth to her first child, Sophie Auguste Friederike. Everyone had hoped for a son and heir to his father. As compensation for having to marry a minor prince, Joanna wanted to raise a great ruler. To her great disappointment, the baby was a girl.

The labour was intense and life-threatening for Joanna, who had to lie in bed for 19 weeks after the birth to recover. She handed her child over to nurses and servants (as was customary in the era for noble mothers), and did not show the child affection.

In the following years, Joanna gave birth to three more children: on 17 November 1730, to her favourite, William Christian Frederick, who suffered from rickets; on 8 August 1734, to Frederick Augustus, who would succeed his father as Prince of Anhalt-Zerbst; and on 10 November 1736, to Auguste Charlotte Christine, who died two weeks later.

Joanna's relationship with her eldest child remained strained. According to Sophie's memoirs, Joanna was often violent and angry towards her for no reason. However, Joanna wanted Sophie to contract an advantageous marriage, so Sophie began from the age of 8 to accompany her mother on her travels. In 1739, they visited Joanna's brother, Adolf Frederick, Prince-Bishop of Lübeck (1710–1771), who had become the guardian of Charles Peter Ulrich, the eleven-year-old orphaned duke of Holstein-Gottorp and only living grandchild of Emperor Peter the Great of Russia (1672–1725). He was therefore a prospective heir in both the Russian Empire and the Kingdom of Sweden lines of succession.

In 1741, Grand Duchess Elizabeth Petrovna of Russia ascended to the throne as empress. She had once been engaged to Joanna's brother Charles Augustus (1706–1727), who died shortly before the wedding, and she cherished his memory for her whole life. Joanna was quick to write a congratulatory letter, and later sent a portrait of Elizabeth's deceased sister, Grand Duchess Anna Petrovna, and received a valuable portrait of the Empress in return. To further the relationship, Joanna sent a portrait of Sophie to the Empress, who was pleased with her beauty.

Meanwhile, the illness of William Christian, Joanna's favourite child, was becoming more severe despite regular cures in Baden-Baden and Karlsbad. After his death on 27 August 1742, Joanna was inconsolable. A few months later, on 17 December, she gave birth to her fifth and last child, a daughter. Joanna asked to be allowed to name her after the Empress of Russia, who became Elisabeth Ulrike's godmother.

In January 1742, Empress Elizabeth brought Peter Ulrich, Duke of Holstein-Gottorp and only child of her late beloved sister Anna Petrovna, to Saint Petersburg. When she adopted Peter and appointed him as her heir, Peter renounced his claim to the Swedish throne. This enabled Elizabeth to appoint as the new heir to the Swedish throne, Peter Ulrich's guardian, Adolf Frederick, Joanna's older brother, which elevated her in rank.

In November 1742, Christian August inherited the Principality of Anhalt-Zerbst with his brother, John Louis, and the family moved to Zerbst.

=== In Russia ===
On 1 January 1744, Joanna was handed a letter from Otto Brümmer, the Grand Marshal of Grand Duke Peter's court. (Peter Ulrich had converted to Russian Orthodoxy and had taken the name Pyotr Fyodorovich.) In the letter, Brümmer asked Joanna to come to Russia with her eldest daughter as soon as possible on the command of the Empress. Only a few hours later, a letter from Frederick II of Prussia arrived to inform Joanna that Frederick saw a possibility to arrange a marriage between Peter and Sophie. On 10 January, Prince Christian August, Princess Joanna, and Princess Sophie traveled to Berlin to see Frederick II. There the King secretly asked Joanna to become an agent of Prussia in Saint Petersburg in place of Vice Chancellor Count Alexey Bestuzhev-Ryumin (1693–1768), an enemy of Prussia who wanted Russia to be allied with Austria and opposed the marriage of Peter and Sophie. Joanna enthusiastically accepted.

On 16 January, after the family and their company left Berlin, Christian August said goodbye and returned to Zerbst, as the Empress had asked him not to go to Russia. Joanna took the pseudonym of "Countess von Reinbeck" for the journey to hide her identity and the marriage plans. The travel was uncomfortable; they often had to sleep in scarcely furnished, roach-infested hotels. They arrived in Moscow on 9 February (O.S.), in time for the celebration of Grand Duke Peter's sixteenth birthday. Soon after their arrival, Joanna received news of the sudden death of her daughter Elisabeth Ulrike in Zerbst on 5 March (N.S.).

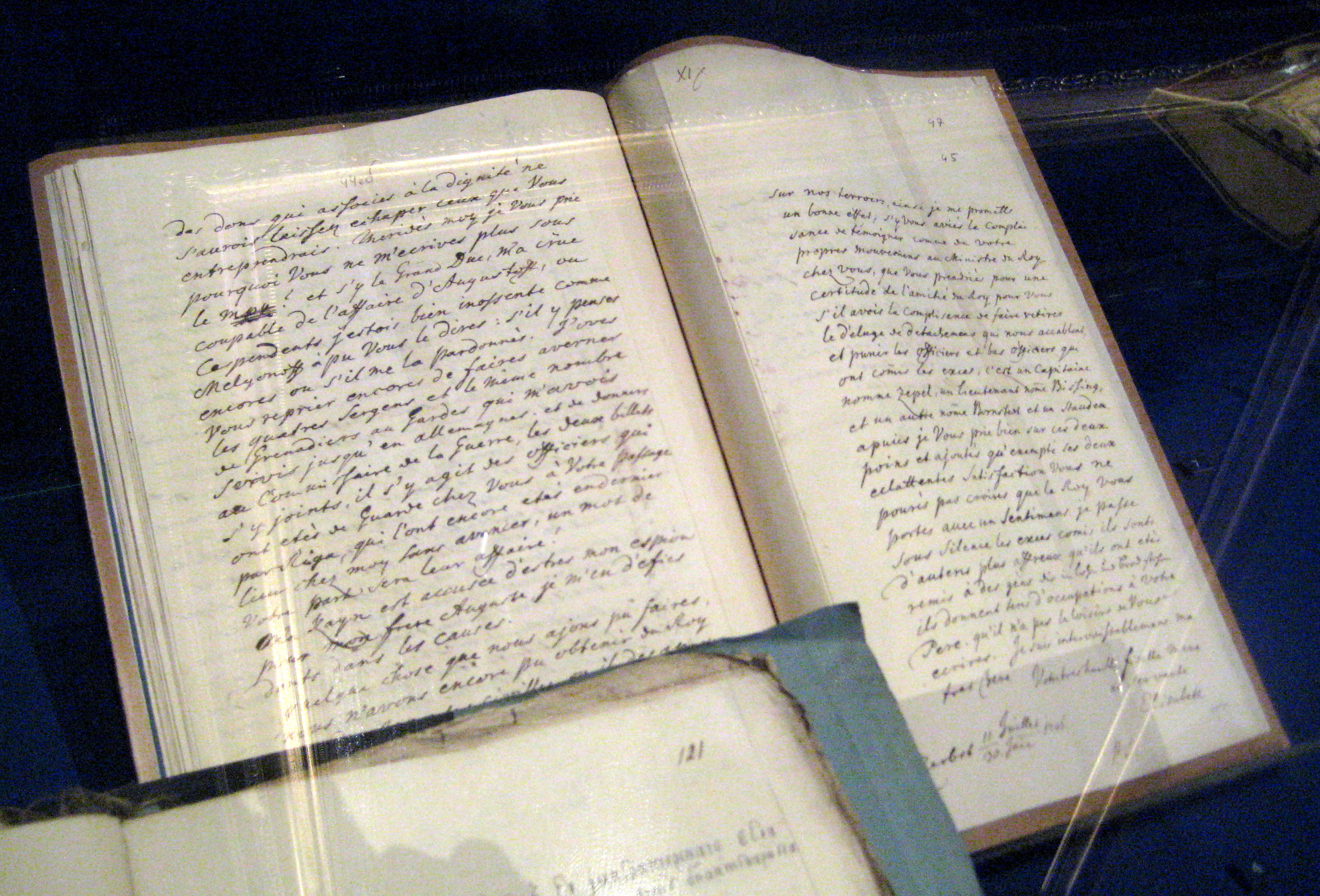
Joanna Elisabeth's letter to her daughter Catherine, 1746

At first, Joanna had a cordial relationship with Empress Elizabeth, often expressing gratitude for her kindness towards her family. However, when Sophie fell ill and the doctors wanted to bleed her, Joanna refused to allow it. That angered the Empress, who removed Joanna from her daughter's bed and tended to Sophie herself. Joanna's constant complaining during this period caused the Russian court to dislike her. While in Russia, Joanna was working on the mission she had received from the King of Prussia, trying to undermine Vice Chancellor Bestuzhev. After Bestuzhev intercepted letters between Joanna, the Prussian and the French ambassador, and the Prussian and French courts, he eventually presented copies to the Empress, who was furious and declared that Joanna must leave Russia right after the wedding. Between the betrothal and the wedding, Joanna's relationship with her future son-in-law also deteriorated.

After Peter and Sophie were married on 21 August 1745 (O.S.), Joanna left Russia without saying goodbye to Sophie (now known as Grand Duchess Catherine Alexeievna), whom she would never see again. Although Joanna departed with many presents from the Empress, in Riga, she was directed to take a message to the King of Prussia, asking him to call back the ambassador who had been caught in the conspiracy against Bestuzhev. This request was a humiliating punishment for Joanna's part in the plot.

== Regency and later life ==
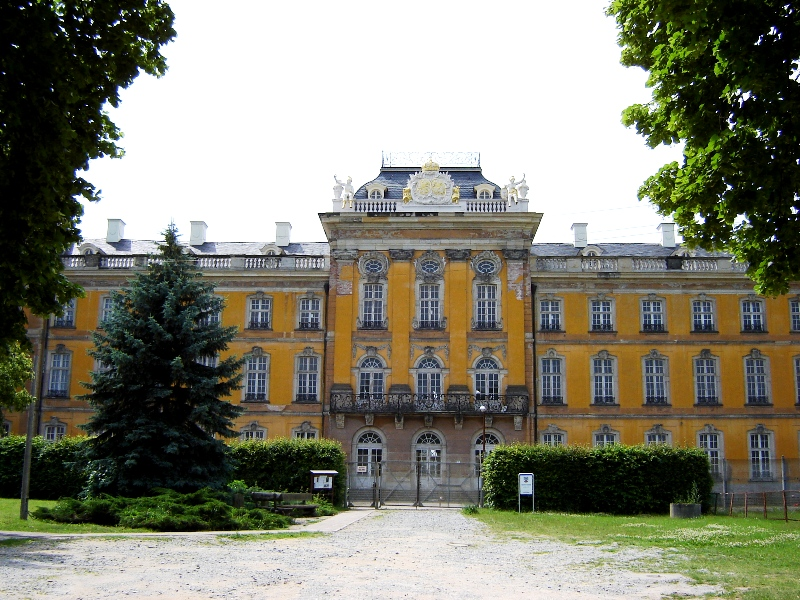
Dornburg Palace, Gommern.

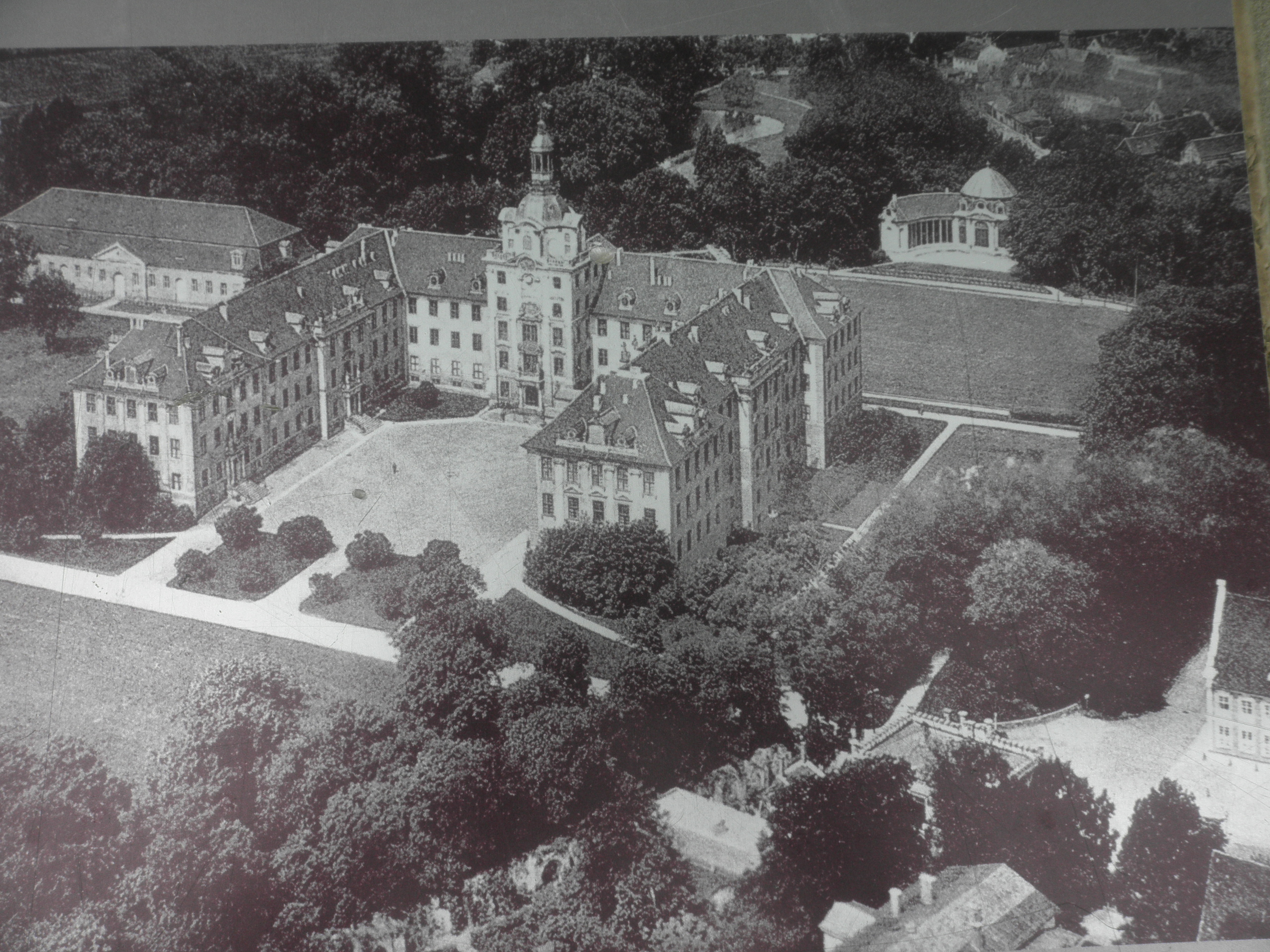
Schloss Zerbst, the main residence of the Princes of Anhalt-Zerbst

After Joanna's husband, Christian August, died on 16 March 1747, their son Frederick Augustus succeeded him as Prince of Anhalt-Zerbst. During his minority, Joanna acted as regent.

She had a new palace built by Friedrich Joachim Stengel in Dornburg to have a more suitable place for hosting her brother, King Adolf Frederick of Sweden, and her daughter, the Grand Duchess, but neither of them ever visited. Her regency was ended when her son reached his majority in 1752.

In 1758, when Prussia invaded Anhalt-Zerbst during the Seven Years' War, the Dowager Princess and her son Frederick Augustus were forced into exile in Paris. Joanna died there in 1760 at the age of 47.

Two years later, her daughter became the Empress Regnant of Russia. Her son, Frederick Augustus never returned to Zerbst.

== Appearance and personality ==
Contemporary accounts described Joanna Elisabeth as having curly blonde hair and a social manner. She was noted for being outgoing in company, talkative, and emotionally expressive.

== Issue ==
Joanna married Christian August on 8 November 1727 in Vechelde. Only two of their five children survived to adulthood:

1. Sophie Auguste Frederike of Anhalt-Zerbst (2 May 1729 – 17 November 1796), who later became Catherine the Great, Empress of Russia.
2. William Christian Frederick of Anhalt-Zerbst (17 November 1730 – 27 August 1742), died in late childhood.
3. Frederick Augustus, Prince of Anhalt-Zerbst (8 August 1734 – 3 March 1793), succeeded his father as Prince of Anhalt-Zerbst and died without issue.
4. Auguste Christine Charlotte of Anhalt-Zerbst (10 November 1736 – 24 November 1736), died in infancy.
5. Elisabeth Ulrike of Anhalt-Zerbst (17 December 1742 – 5 March 1745), died in early childhood.

== Ancestry ==
Ancestors of Duchess Joanna Elisabeth of Holstein-Gottorp

16. John Adolf, Duke of Holstein-Gottorp (=28)
8. Frederick III, Duke of Holstein-Gottorp (=14)
17. Augusta of Denmark (=29)
4. Christian Albert, Duke of Holstein-Gottorp
18. John George I, Elector of Saxony (=30)
9. Marie Elisabeth of Saxony (=15)
19. Magdalene Sibylle of Prussia (=31)
2. Christian August of Holstein-Gottorp, Prince of Eutin
20. Christian IV of Denmark
10. Frederick III of Denmark
21. Anne Catherine of Brandenburg
5. Frederikke Amalie of Denmark
22. George, Duke of Brunswick-Lüneburg
11. Sophie Amalie of Brunswick-Lüneburg
23. Anne Eleonore of Hesse-Darmstadt
1. Joanna Elisabeth of Holstein-Gottorp
24. Frederick V, Margrave of Baden-Durlach
12. Frederick VI, Margrave of Baden-Durlach
25. Barbara of Württemberg
6. Frederick VII, Margrave of Baden-Durlach
26. John Casimir, Count Palatine of Kleeburg
13. Christina Magdalena of the Palatinate-Zweibrücken
27. Catharina of Sweden
3. Albertina Frederica of Baden-Durlach
28. John Adolf, Duke of Holstein-Gottorp (=16)
14. Frederick III, Duke of Holstein-Gottorp (=8)
29. Augusta of Denmark (=17)
7. Augusta Marie of Holstein-Gottorp
30. John George I, Elector of Saxony (=18)
15. Marie Elisabeth of Saxony (=9)
31. Magdalene Sibylle of Prussia (=19)

== In popular culture ==
Joanna appears as a character in the historical novel A Princess at the Court of Russia by Eva Martens. She was played by Isabelle Schosing in the 2014 Russia-1 historical television drama-documentary Ekaterina and by Gillian Anderson in season two of the loosely historically based series The Great.
