= Anna Sophia =

Anna Sophia (variants include Anna Sophie, Anna Sofia, and AnnaSophia) is a feminine given name and may refer to:

== Royalty ==
- Anna Sophia I, Abbess of Quedlinburg (1619–1680)
- Anna Sophia II, Abbess of Quedlinburg (1638–1683)
- Anna Sophia of Prussia (1527–1591), German noblewoman
- Princess Anna Sophie of Denmark (1647–1717), eldest daughter of King Frederick III of Denmark
- Anna Sophie of Saxe-Gotha-Altenburg (1670–1728)
- Anna Sophie of Anhalt (1584–1652)

== Other people ==
- Anna Sophia Berglund (born 1986), American Playboy model and actress
- Anna Sophia Folch (born 1985), Brazilian actress
- Anna Sophia Hagman (1758–1826), Swedish ballet dancer
- Anna Sophia Holmstedt (1759–1807), Swedish ballet dancer and translator
- Anna Sophie Okkels (born 1990), Danish handball player
- Anna Sophia Polak (1874–1943), Jewish feminist and author
- Anna Sofia Ramström (1738–1786), Lady's maid of the Queen of Sweden, Sophie Magdalena of Denmark
- AnnaSophia Robb (born 1993), American actress, model, and singer
- Anna Sofia Sevelin (1790–1871), Swedish opera singer
- Anna Sophie Schack (1689–1760), Danish noble, landowner and builder
