= Christian Augustus of Holstein-Gottorp, Prince of Eutin =

Prince-bishop of Lübeck (1673–1726)

Christian Augustus
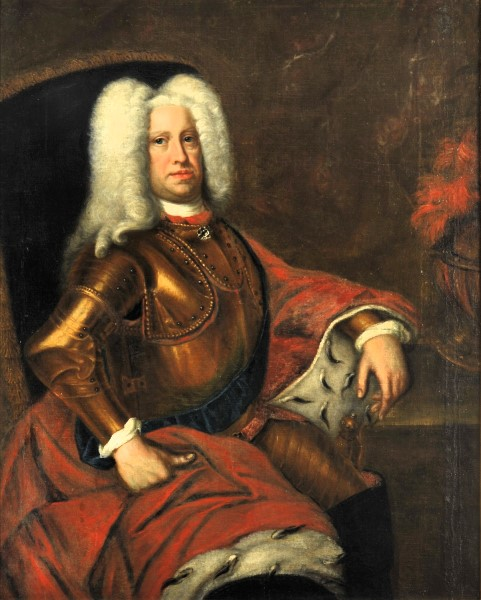
- Portrait of Christian August, c. 1710
- Born: 11 January 1673; Schleswig
- Died: 24 April 1726 (aged 53); Eutin
- Spouse: Albertina Frederica of Baden-Durlach (m. 1704)
- Issue Detail: Hedwig Sophie, Abbess of Herford; Prince Charles Augustus; Princess Frederica Amalia; Anne, Princess William of Saxe-Gotha-Altenburg; Adolf Frederick, King of Sweden; Frederick Augustus I, Duke of Oldenburg; Joanna Elisabeth, Princess of Anhalt-Zerbst; Prince George Louis
- House: House of Holstein-Gottorp
- Father: Christian Albert, Duke of Holstein-Gottorp
- Mother: Princess Frederica Amalia of Denmark

Christian Augustus of Holstein-Gottorp-Eutin (11 January 1673 – 24 April 1726) was a cadet of the reigning ducal House of Holstein-Gottorp who became prince-bishop of Lübeck (de facto prince of Eutin) and regent of the Duchy of Holstein-Gottorp.

He was the father of Adolf Frederick, King of Sweden, and the maternal grandfather of Catherine the Great, Empress of Russia.

== Biography ==
He was a younger son of Christian Albert, Duke of Holstein-Gottorp and Princess Frederica Amalia of Denmark, daughter of King Frederick III of Denmark. His elder brother, Frederick IV, succeeded their father as ruler of the duchy, Christian Augustus being given a small fiefdom in 1695, whereupon he took the title Duke of Holstein-Eutin. Additionally, he was appointed coadjutor of the Prince-Bishopric of Lübeck, a Lutheran Imperial state within the Holy Roman Empire centred in Eutin, in 1701, and his family managed to have him elected as the bishop on 26 April 1706.

His eldest brother died in 1702, leaving only an underage son, Charles Frederick, Duke of Holstein-Gottorp, as his heir. From 1702 to 1708 Christian Augustus was co-regent with his widowed sister-in-law, Hedvig Sophia of Sweden, for Charles Frederick, having been first installed as administrator under her authority. Upon her death in 1708, Christian Augustus became sole regent of Holstein-Gottorp, which duchy was severely ravaged by the violence of the Great Northern War.

=== Marriage and issue ===
Christian Augustus married his cousin Margravine Albertina Frederica of Baden-Durlach (3 July 1682 – 26 December 1755), on 2 September 1704, with whom he had ten children:

- Hedwig Sophie Auguste of Holstein-Gottorp (9 October 1705 – 4 October 1764), Abbess of Herford, 1750–1764
- Charles Augustus of Holstein-Gottorp (26 November 1706 – 31 May 1727), engaged to marry the future Elizabeth of Russia, but died just before the wedding in Saint Petersburg of smallpox
- Frederica Amalia of Holstein-Gottorp (12 January 1708 – 19 January 1782), a nun at Quedlinburg
- Anne of Holstein-Gottorp (3 February 1709 – 2 February 1758), wed Prince Wilhelm of Saxe-Gotha-Altenburg (1701-1771), no issue. He was a brother of Augusta of Saxe-Gotha
- Adolf Frederick of Holstein-Gottorp, King of Sweden (14 May 1710 – 12 April 1771). He was named crown prince of Sweden in 1743 and ascended the throne in 1751 as Adolf Frederick, King of Sweden.
- Frederick Augustus of Holstein-Gottorp, Duke of Oldenburg (20 September 1711 – 6 July 1785). He was initially bishop of Lübeck, and after his brother moved to Sweden, he inherited Eutin as well. In 1773, as part of a family agreement involving Denmark, Russia and Holstein-Gottorp, he also received a new duchy, Oldenburg, consisting of the counties of Oldenburg and Delmenhorst.
- Johanna Elisabeth (24 October 1712 – 30 May 1760), wed Christian Augustus, Prince of Anhalt-Zerbst, and became the mother of Catherine the Great, Empress of Russia.
- William Christian of Holstein-Gottorp (20 September 1716 – 26 June 1719), died in infancy
- Frederick Conrad of Holstein-Gottorp (12 March 1718 – 1719), died in infancy
- Georg Ludwig of Holstein-Gottorp (16 March 1719 – 7 September 1763). His son Peter inherited the Duchy of Oldenburg from his childless cousin, the son of Frederick August

Christian Augustus was succeeded by his eldest son Charles Augustus, who died before taking up the office, and then by his second son, Adolf Frederick.

== Ancestry ==
Ancestors of Christian Augustus of Holstein-Gottorp, Prince of Eutin

8. John Adolf, Duke of Holstein-Gottorp
4. Frederick III, Duke of Holstein-Gottorp
9. Augusta of Denmark
2. Christian Albert, Duke of Holstein-Gottorp
10. John George I, Elector of Saxony
5. Marie Elisabeth of Saxony
11. Magdalene Sibylle of Prussia
1. Christian Augustus of Holstein-Gottorp, Prince of Eutin
12. Christian IV of Denmark
6. Frederick III of Denmark
13. Anne Catherine of Brandenburg
3. Frederikke Amalie of Denmark
14. George, Duke of Brunswick-Lüneburg
7. Sophie Amalie of Brunswick-Lüneburg
15. Anne Eleonore of Hesse-Darmstadt

== Notes and references ==
Christian Augustus House of Holstein-Gottorp Cadet branch of the House of Oldenburg Born: 11 January 1673 Died: 24 April 1726
Religious titles
Regnal titles
Preceded by Augustus Frederick (Lutheran Administrator)	Prince-Bishop of Lübeck; 1705–1726 (Lutheran Administrator)	Succeeded by Charles Augustus (Lutheran Administrator)
