= Marie Elisabeth, Abbess of Quedlinburg =

- Duchess of Schleswig-Holstein-Gottorp
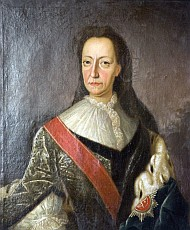

Princess-Abbess of Quedlinburg
- Reign: 1718 - 17 July 1755
- Predecessor: Maria Aurora von Königsmarck(provost); Anna Dorothea, Abbess of Quedlinburg
- Successor: Princess Anna Amalia of Prussia
- Born: 21 March 1678; Hamburg
- Died: 17 July 1755 (aged 77); Quedlinburg
- Burial: Abbey Church of St. Servatius
- House: Holstein-Gottorp
- Father: Christian Albert, Duke of Holstein-Gottorp
- Mother: Princess Frederica Amalia of Denmark

Duchess Marie Elisabeth of Schleswig-Holstein-Gottorp (21 March 1678 – 17 July 1755) was Princess-Abbess of Quedlinburg from 1718 until her death.

== Early life and ancestry ==
Born into the Holstein-Gottorp line of the House of Oldenburg, Duchess Marie Elisabeth was born in Hamburg as the second daughter and youngest child of Christian Albert, Duke of Holstein-Gottorp, and his wife, Princess Frederica Amalia of Denmark. She was considered for marriage to Charles XII of Sweden, but he declined.

== Biography ==
In 1718, she was elected Princess-Abbess of Quedlinburg. However, the Kings in Prussia, who obtained the guardianship of the abbey-principality as electors of Brandenburg in 1698, tried to impose their authority over this small state of the Holy Roman Empire by attempting to influence the election of new princess-abbess in favour of their own relatives.

Marie Elisabeth was elected several times during the interregnum, while the abbey-principality was ruled by the provost Countess Maria Aurora von Königsmarck, but King Frederick William I of Prussia refused to consent to each election and Holy Roman Emperor Charles VI consequently refused to confirm the elections.

The election, however, eventually went ahead but the selection of a duchess of Schleswig-Holstein-Gottorp instead than a princess of Prussia caused quite a stir. Due to her territorial disputes with the King in Prussia, Marie Elisabeth turned to the Holy Roman Emperor, but without success.

== Death ==
As the ruler, Princess-Abbess Marie Elisabeth restored the castle, the abbey and the Abbey Church of St. Servatius, where she was buried upon her death on 17 July 1755 in Quedlinburg. After her death, a princess of Prussia was finally elected and Marie Elisabeth was succeeded by Princess Anna Amalia of Prussia.

== Ancestry ==
Ancestors of Marie Elisabeth, Abbess of Quedlinburg

8. John Adolf, Duke of Holstein-Gottorp
4. Frederick III, Duke of Holstein-Gottorp
9. Augusta of Denmark
2. Christian Albert, Duke of Holstein-Gottorp
10. John George I, Elector of Saxony
5. Marie Elisabeth of Saxony
11. Magdalene Sibylle of Prussia
1. Marie Elisabeth, Abbess of Quedlinburg
12. Christian IV of Denmark
6. Frederick III of Denmark
13. Anne Catherine of Brandenburg
3. Princess Frederica Amalia of Denmark
14. George, Duke of Brunswick-Lüneburg
7. Sophie Amalie of Brunswick-Lüneburg
15. Anne Eleonore of Hesse-Darmstadt

== Bibliography ==
- H. Lorenz: Werdegang von Stift und Stadt Quedlinburg. Quedlinburg 1922.

Marie Elisabeth House of Holstein-Gottorp Cadet branch of the House of Oldenburg
Regnal titles
Vacant Office of provost held by Maria Aurora von Königsmarck Title last held by Anna Dorothea	Princess-Abbess of Quedlinburg; 1718–1755	Succeeded by Anna Amalia
