= Anna Polak =

Anna Polak may refer to:

- Anna Dresden-Polak (1906–1943), Dutch gymnast
- Anna Sophia Polak (1874–1943), Dutch feminist and author
