= Anna Dorothea =

Anna Dorothea may refer to:

- Anna Dorothea, Abbess of Quedlinburg (1657–1704), Princess-Abbess of Quedlinburg
- Dorothea von Medem (1761–1821), Duchess of Courland
