= Gottorp Fury =

Episode of drunken revelry in 1698

The Gottorp Fury (Swedish: Gottorpska raseriet or Holsteinska raseriet, 'Holstein Fury') was the name given to the wild excesses when the 16-year-old king Charles XII of Sweden and his cousin Frederick IV, Duke of Holstein-Gottorp amused themselves in the summer of 1698. Duke Frederick had come to Stockholm to marry the king's sister Hedwig Sophia. The duke was eleven years older than Charles; he was even more unruly than the young king and incited the latter to outrageous acts. Together with a following of young people they galloped through Stockholm, yanking hats and wigs off people's heads. They threw out furniture from the palace windows and cherry pits at the king's ministers.

Many of the stories about their doings were almost certainly exaggerated and are thought to have been spread to discredit the duke. For instance, there is no proof to the story that they chopped the heads off calves, dogs, goats, and sheep, whereafter they were said to have thrown the carcasses through the palace windows. According to this story, the floors in the palace were slippery with blood running down the palace staircases.

Popular discontentment grew with the king's and duke's excesses. One Sunday three pastors in Stockholm churches held sermons with the theme Woe thee, o land, when thy king is a child (Ecclesiastes 10:16). When Frederick returned home in August, Charles ceased his antics and returned to the business of government. He had a relapse when Frederick returned to Stockholm in 1699. During one drunken night, a bear was killed when it fell through a window to the palace yard after having been forced to drink wine. Charles was quite drunk, and after this incident vowed never to drink strong alcohol again. He famously kept the vow, with a few exceptions, to the end of his days.

== Sources ==
- Robert K. Massie (1986). Peter the Great. p. 321 f. ISBN 91-34-50718-3.
