= Anna Amalia, Abbess of Quedlinburg =

Prussian princess (1723–1787)

Anna Amalia of Prussia
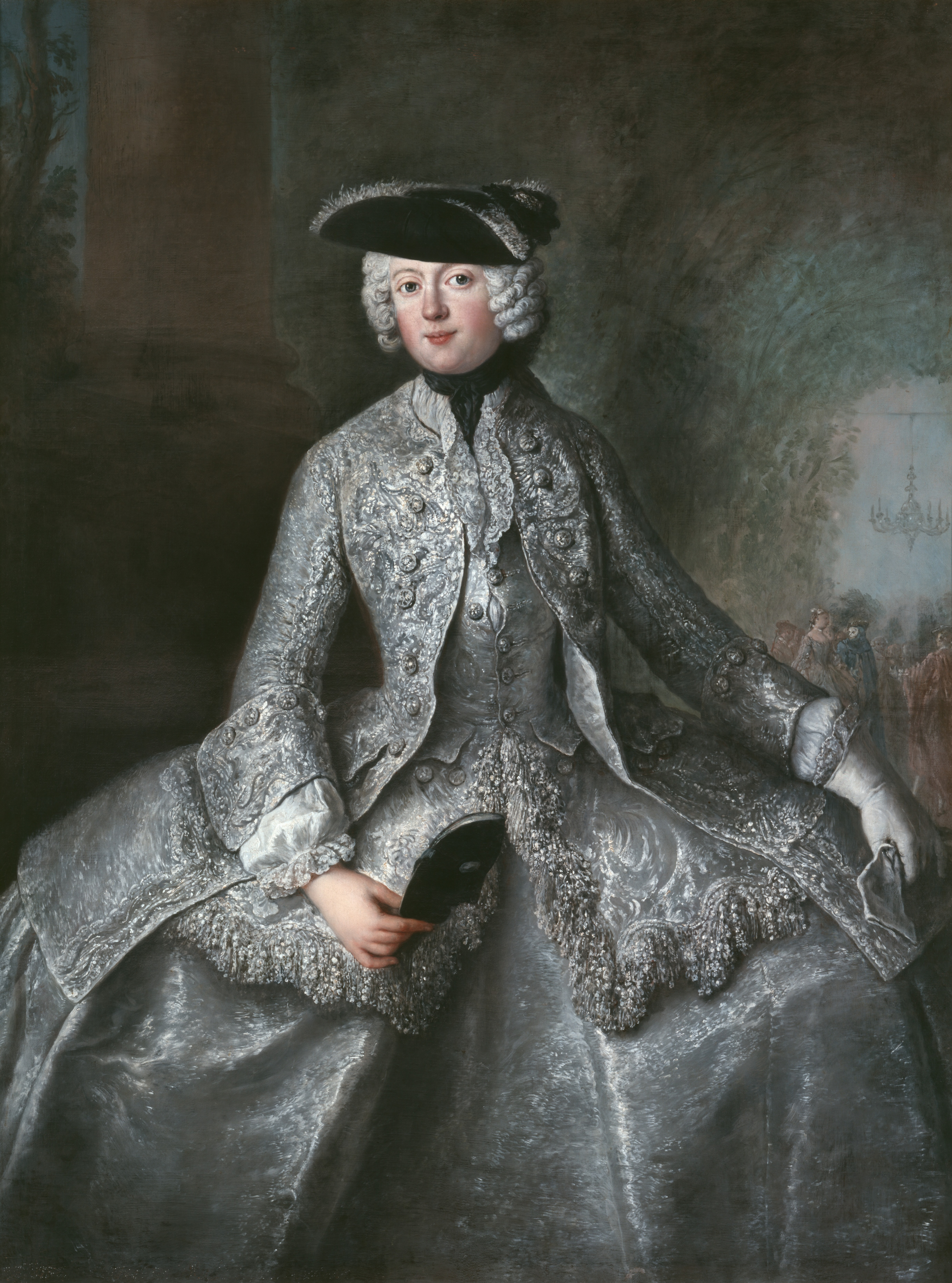
- Portrait by Antoine Pesne (before 1757)

Princess-Abbess of Quedlinburg
- Reign: 1755 – 30 March 1787
- Predecessor: Marie Elisabeth
- Successor: Sophia Albertina
- Born: 9 November 1723; Berlin, Kingdom of Prussia
- Died: 30 March 1787 (aged 63); Berlin, Kingdom of Prussia
- Burial: Berlin Cathedral
- House: Hohenzollern
- Father: Frederick William I
- Mother: Sophia Dorothea of Hanover

Princess Anna Amalia of Prussia (9 November 1723 – 30 March 1787) was an early modern German composer and music curator who served as princess-abbess of Quedlinburg. She was a princess of Prussia as the daughter of Frederick William I of Prussia and the sister of Frederick the Great.

== Early life (1723–1755) ==
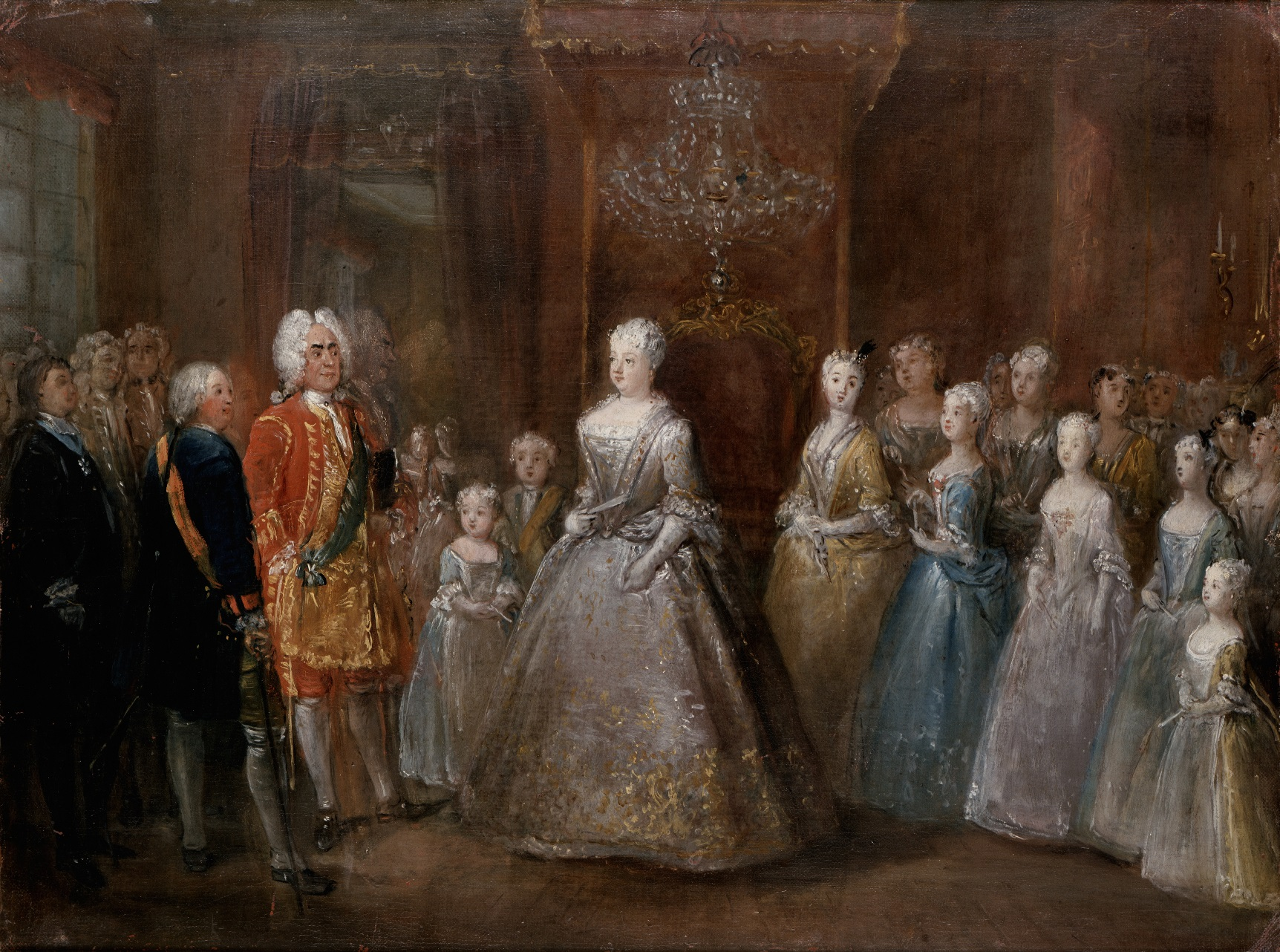
1729 painting by Antoine Pesne depicting the visit of Augustus II of Poland. Amalia's mother stands in the center, her sisters on the queen's right, and a 6-year-old Amalia at her mother's left.

Princess Anna Amalia of Prussia was born on 9 November 1723 in Berlin as a daughter of King Frederick William I and his wife, born Princess Sophia Dorothea of Hanover. She had 13 siblings, 10 of whom survived infancy, including the future Frederick II (1712–1786). The Prussian royal children were raised in Berlin, where they lived in the Royal Palace, but they also regularly spent time in the king's favourite residence, a jagdschloss ("hunting lodge") in Königs Wusterhausen.

Amalia was musically inclined, just like Crown Prince Frederick, but her formal instruction was only possible after the death of their abusive father who considered music to be decadent. Frederick William had an unpredictable temper, often dragging her across a room by her hair in a rage. Amalia's childhood was overshadowed by her father: described as an uneducated, unpolished and spartan soldier, he was an alcoholic whose favourite hobby was smoking pipes with commoners, an extremely pious and narrow-minded Calvinist who loved his wife and was faithful to her, but behaved violently towards his entire family, courtiers, and anyone who upset him. He preferred a simple life and only enjoyed German food and culture, detesting everything French. He believed that women were for breeding only and to be completely submissive to their husbands. On the other hand, Queen Sophia Dorothea was a well-educated and ambitious woman who enjoyed theatre and balls and loved French culture and fashion. She entrusted the care of her children to a French staff, to which the king could not object as French was the language of international diplomacy. Music became Amalia's secret consolation. She was first taught by Crown Prince Frederick with the support of their mother, and learned to play the harpsichord, the flute, and the violin.

The king was especially cruel to the crown prince as he considered his passion for music, literature and French culture unmanly. Frederick attempted to flee to their mother's family in England in 1730, but was captured and court-martialed. For her part in the escape attempt, the king nearly beat his eldest daughter Princess Wilhelmine to death. Amalia was 7 years old at the time. In May 1740, Frederick William I died and Amalia's eldest brother succeeded him as Frederick II.

=== Suggested marriage (1743–1744) ===
After Prince Adolf Frederick of Holstein-Gottorp was elected heir of the childless king of Sweden, Frederick I in 1743, Prussia, Russia, and Sweden pursued an alliance. A marriage was suggested between the new Swedish crown prince and either Amalia or her elder sister Louisa Ulrika. Their brother King Frederick thought that Louisa Ulrika was too ambitious to be a good queen in a relatively powerless monarchy as Sweden was then in the Age of Liberty (1720–1772), a period of parliamentary governance. He described Amalia as mild and good-hearted and thus more suitable for the role. It has been suggested that he believed that Amalia would be easier to control as a Prussian agent in the Swedish court. However, the Swedish envoy preferred Louisa Ulrika, and she was married by proxy in July 1744.

== Abbess, composer, and music curator (1755–1787) ==
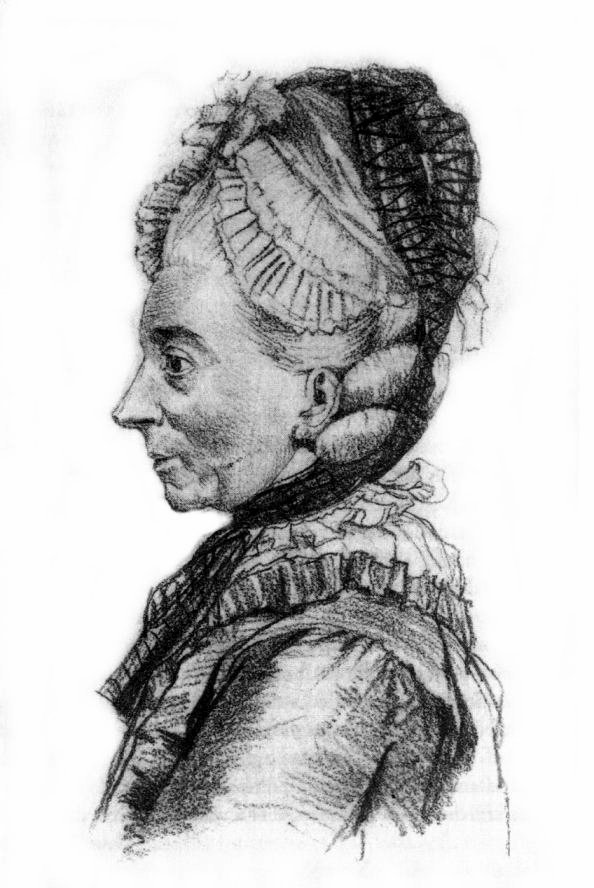
Posthumous portrait by the Realist artist Adolph Menzel.

In 1755, after the death of the previous abbess, Duchess Marie Elisabeth of Schleswig-Holstein-Gottorp, Amalia was elected princess-abbess of the Quedlinburg Abbey, which made her a wealthy and influential woman with the right to sit and speak in the Imperial Diet. She spent most of her time in Berlin and devoted herself to music, becoming known as a patron and composer. In 1758, she began studying music theory and composition under Johann Kirnberger, a student of Johann Sebastian Bach.

She achieved modest fame and is most known for her chamber music, including trios, marches, cantatas, songs, and fugues. Her favourite among her own compositions was the passion cantata, Der Tod Jesu ("The Death of Jesus"), based on a poem by Karl Wilhelm Ramler. Only a few of her works have survived and she may have destroyed many of her own compositions, as she described herself as very timid and self-critical. More compositions by her may surface as a result of the 2000 discovery of the archives of the Sing-Akademie zu Berlin in Kyiv which had been lost since World War II.

Amalia also collected music, preserving over 600 volumes by Johann Sebastian Bach, George Frideric Handel, Georg Philipp Telemann, Carl Heinrich Graun and Carl Philipp Emanuel Bach, among others. Her library was split between East and West Germany after World War II and reunited after German reunification in 1990. Today it is housed in the Berlin State Library.

Princess-abbess Anna Amalia died on 30 March 1787 at the age of 63 and was buried in Berlin Cathedral. She was succeeded by her niece, Princess Sophia Albertina of Sweden.

=== Selected compositions ===
- Sonata in F major (for Flute and Basso Continuo) (1771)
  1. Adagio
  2. Allegretto
  3. Allegro ma non troppo

This flute sonata is Amalia's best-known composition. It has a duration of about 11 minutes.

== Ancestry ==
Ancestors of Anna Amalia, Abbess of Quedlinburg

8. Frederick William, Elector of Brandenburg
4. Frederick I of Prussia
9. Louise Henriette of Orange-Nassau
2. Frederick William I of Prussia
10. Ernest Augustus, Elector of Hanover (=12)
5. Sophia Charlotte of Hanover
11. Sophia of the Palatinate (=13)
1. Princess Anna Amalia of Prussia
12. Ernest Augustus, Elector of Hanover (=10)
6. George I of Great Britain
13. Sophia of the Palatinate (=11)
3. Sophia Dorothea of Hanover
14. George William, Duke of Brunswick-Lüneburg
7. Sophia Dorothea of Celle
15. Éléonore Desmier d'Olbreuse

== Bibliography ==
- Henry Gardiner Adams, ed. (1857). "Amalie, Ann" . A Cyclopaedia of Female Biography: 32. Wikidata Q115632010 – via Wikisource.
- Farquhar, Michael (1 May 2001). A Treasury of Royal Scandals: The Shocking True Stories History's Wickedest, Weirdest, Most Wanton Kings, Queens, Tsars, Popes, and Emperors (Illustrated ed.). Penguin Books. p. 114. ISBN 978-0140280241.
- Leitner, Thea (1993). Skandal bei Hof (in German). Wien: Ueberreuter. ISBN 978-3-8000-3492-5.
- Grimsted, Patricia Kennedy (2003). Bach is Back in Berlin: The Return of the Sing-Akademie Archive from Ukraine in the Context of Displaced Cultural Treasures and Restitution Politics (PDF). Harvard Ukrainian Research Institute – via University Center for International Studies, University of Pittsburgh.
- Mitford, Nancy (23 July 2013). Frederick the Great (Reprint ed.). New York Review Books. pp. 19, 27–29. ISBN 978-1590176238 – via Google Books.
- Schieder, Theodor (2000). "Frederick's youth – the international situation and personal destiny. Father and son.". In Berkeley, Sabina; Scott, H.M. (eds.). Frederick the Great. Translated by Berkeley, Sabina; Scott, H.M. (English ed.). London, New York: Longman. p. 7. ISBN 0-582-01768-8. OCLC 1153309216 – via Internet Archive.
- Kugler, Franz Theodor (1845). "Chapter V. Discord Between Father and Son". The Pictorial History of Germany During the Reign of Frederick the Great: Comprehending a Complete History of the Silesian campaigns, and the Seven Years War. Illustrated by Adolph Menzel. Henry G. Bohn. p. 55. LCCN 04027314. OL 6946179M – via Internet Archive.
- Huberty, Michel; Giraud, Alain; Magdelaine, F.; Magdelaine, B. (1989). L'Allemagne dynastique : Hohenzollern, Waldeck, et familles alliés [Dynastic Germany: The Hohenzollerns, the Waldecks, and Allied Families] (in French). A. Giraud. pp. 162, 172. ISBN 978-2901138051.
- von Ammon, Christoph Heinrich (1768). Généalogie ascendante jusqu'au quatrième degré, inclusivement de tous les rois et princes de maisons souveraines de l'Europe actuellement vivans, réduite en CXIV. Tables de XVI. quartiers, composées selon les principles du blason, avec une table générale [Ascending Genealogy up to the Fourth Degree, Including All Kings and Princes of Sovereign Houses of Europe Living Now, in the Form of 114 Tables of 16 Quarters, Composed According to the Principles of Blazon, With a General Table] (in French). Berlin. Table 16 – via Google Books.
- Jägerskiöld, Olof (1945). Lovisa Ulrika [Louisa Ulrika] (in Swedish). Stockholm: Wahlström & Widstrand. OCLC 15005998.Atkinson, Emma Willsher (1858). "Life of Sophia Dorothea, of Hanover, Third Queen of Prussia". Memoirs of the Queens of Prussia. W. Kent and Co. pp. 132–133, 179–182, 205. OCLC 276863655 – via Internet Archive.
- Benecke, G. (19 May 2014). Society and Politics in Germany 1500–1750. London, Toronto, Buffalo: Routledge. Appendix III. ISBN 978-0415759571.
- Chisholm, Hugh, ed. (1911). "Sweden" . Encyclopædia Britannica. Vol. 26 (11th ed.). Cambridge University Press. p. 206.
- Peacock Jezic, Diane (1988). "Anna Amalia, Princess of Prussia (1723–1787). The Court of Frederick the Great". Women Composers. The Lost Tradition Found [Louisa Ulrika]. New York: The Feminist Press at CUNY. pp. 47–50. ISBN 978-1558610743. OCLC 18715963 – via Internet Archive.

Anna Amalia House of Hohenzollern
Regnal titles
Preceded by Maria Elisabeth	Princess-Abbess of Quedlinburg; 1756–1787	Succeeded by Sophia Albertina
