= Princess Albertina Frederica of Baden-Durlach =

German princess (1682–1755)

Princess Albertina Frederica
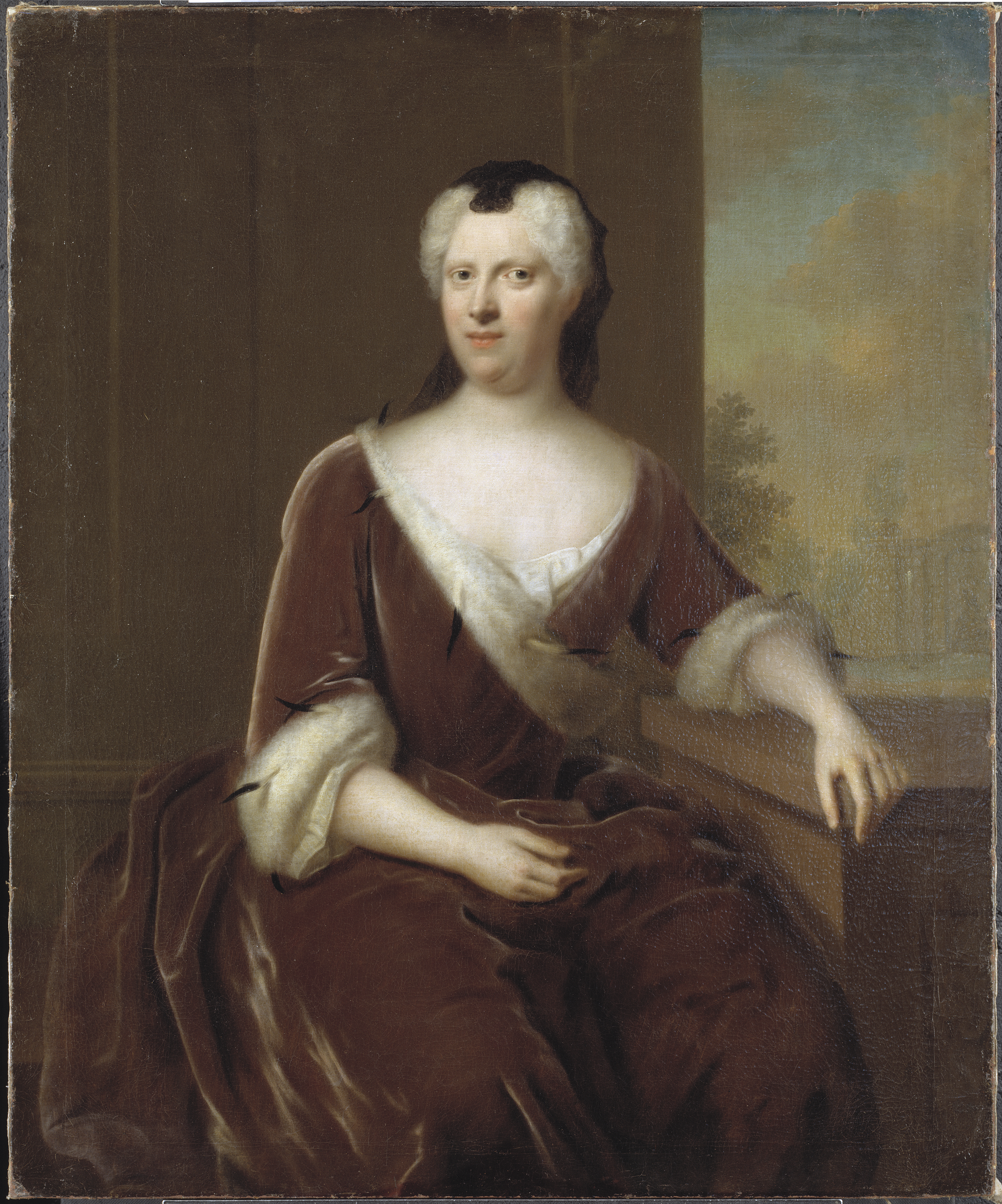
- Portrait by Balthasar Denner
- Born: 3 July 1682; Karlsburg Castle in Durlach
- Died: 22 December 1755 (aged 73); Hamburg
- Spouse: Christian August of Holstein-Gottorp, Prince of Eutin (m. 1704; died 1726)
- Issue Detail: Hedwig Sophie, Abbess of Herford; Prince Charles Augustus; Princess Frederica Amalia; Anne, Princess William of Saxe-Gotha-Altenburg; Adolf Frederick, King of Sweden; Frederick August I, Duke of Oldenburg; Joanna Elisabeth, Princess of Anhalt-Zerbst; Prince George Louis
- House: House of Zähringen
- Father: Frederick VII, Margrave of Baden-Durlach
- Mother: Augusta Marie of Holstein-Gottorp

Princess Margravine Albertina Frederica of Baden-Durlach (3 July 1682 – 22 December 1755) was a German princess, a daughter of Frederick VII, Margrave of Baden-Durlach and his wife Duchess Augusta Marie of Holstein-Gottorp. She married Christian August of Holstein-Gottorp, Prince of Eutin.

== Biography ==
On 2 September 1704, she married Christian August of Holstein-Gottorp, Prince of Eutin.

In 1726, her husband died, and her eldest son became monarch. One year later, he died childless, and her second son Adolf Frederick ascended the throne. Adolf Frederick was a minor but was allowed to govern "with his mother's support" and guidance. She also gave him her estates Stendorf, Mönch-Neversdorf and Lenzahn to provide him with an income.

Through her paternal grandmother, Countess Palatine Christina Magdalena of Zweibrücken, a sister of King Charles X of Sweden, Albertina Frederica descended from the Swedish royal house, which is why her son could be elected as the heir to the Swedish throne in 1743.

== Issue ==
She and Christian August had ten children of which eight survived to adulthood:

- Hedwig Sophie Auguste (9 October 1705 – 4 October 1764), Abbess of Herford from 1750
- Charles Augustus (26 November 1706 – 31 May 1727), engaged to Grand Duchess Elizabeth Petrovna of Russia
- Frederica Amalia (12 January 1708 – 19 January 1782), a nun at Quedlinburg Abbey
- Anne (3 February 1709 – 2 February 1758), who wed Prince William of Saxe-Gotha-Altenburg
- Adolf Frederick of Eutin (14 May 1710 – 12 April 1771), became crown prince of Sweden in 1743, and then ascended the throne as King of Sweden in 1751.
- Frederick August of Eutin (20 September 1711 – 6 July 1785), Bishop of Lübeck after Adolf Frederick (who held it until going to Sweden), as well as the principality of Eutin. In 1773, Frederick August received the Duchy of Oldenburg and the county of Delmenhorst from his young cousin (Paul, Tsarevich of Russia, later Paul I of Russia, also Duke of Holstein-Gottorp), which would become the Grand Duchy of Oldenburg.
- Johanna Elisabeth (24 October 1712 – 30 May 1760), wed Christian August, Prince of Anhalt-Zerbst, and mother of Catherine II, Empress of Russia.
- Wilhelm Christian (20 September 1716 – 26 June 1719), died in early childhood
- Friedrich Conrad (12 March 1718 – 1719), died in early childhood
- Georg Ludwig (16 March 1719 – 7 September 1763)
