= Frederick IV of Holstein-Gottorp =

Duke of Holstein-Gottorp from 1695 to 1702

Frederick IV
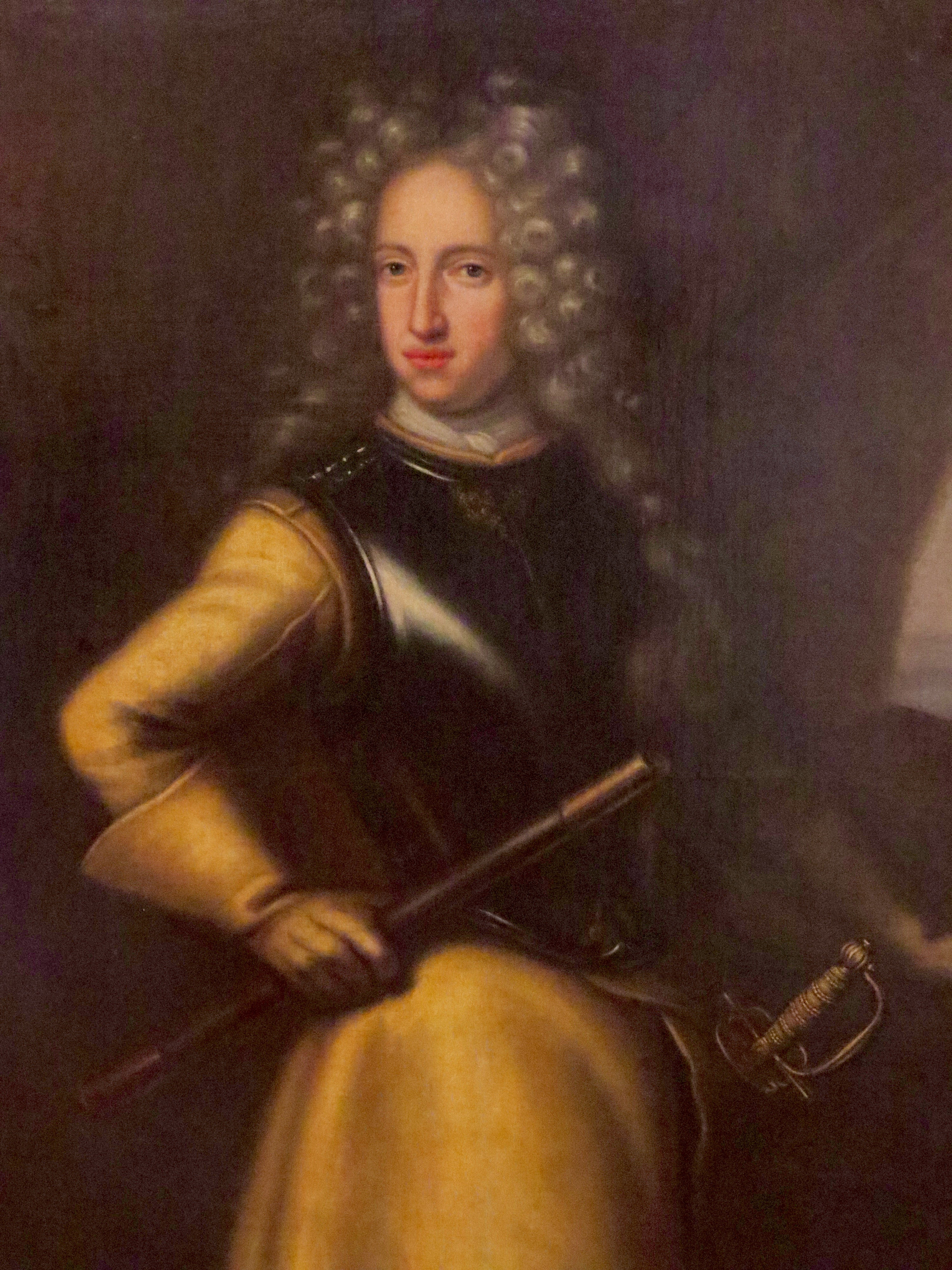
- Anonymous portrait, 17th–18th century

Duke of Holstein-Gottorp
- Reign: 6 January 1695 – 19 July 1702
- Predecessor: Christian Albert
- Successor: Charles Frederick
- Born: 18 October 1671; Gottorf Castle
- Died: 19 July 1702 (aged 30); Near Kliszów, Poland
- Burial: Schleswig Cathedral
- Spouse: Hedwig Sophia of Sweden (m. 1698)
- Issue: Charles Frederick, Duke of Holstein-Gottorp
- House: Holstein-Gottorp
- Father: Christian Albert, Duke of Holstein-Gottorp
- Mother: Princess Frederica Amalia of Denmark

Frederick IV (18 October 1671 – 19 July 1702) was the reigning Duke of Holstein-Gottorp. He took part in the Great Northern War and was killed by artillery fire in the Battle of Kliszów in Poland.

== Personal life ==
He was born in Gottorf Castle as the elder son of Duke Christian Albert of Holstein-Gottorp and Princess Frederica Amalia of Denmark. He was married on 12 May 1698 to Princess Hedwig Sophia of Sweden and they had an only child, Charles Frederick, who eventually fathered the future Tsar Peter III of Russia, therefore making Frederick a patrilineal ancestor to all Russian emperors after Catherine II.

== Gottorp Fury ==
According to Robert Massie's Peter the Great: His Life and World, Duke Frederick arrived in Stockholm to marry his cousin, Princess Hedwig Sophia, soon befriending his first cousin and new brother-in-law, King Charles XII (their respective mothers, Frederica Amalia and Ulrika Eleonora, being daughters of Frederick III of Denmark).

His visit made such an impression on Swedish society that the excesses surrounding him and the King earned him "the Gottorp Fury" as a nickname. Duke Frederick and King Charles regularly participated in wild festivities, drinking binges, and outlandish pranks. Generally, Duke Frederick's influence was the blame for the King's "reckless" lifestyle. There were even rumors at the time that the Duke sought to kill the King and usurp the throne. As it happened, according to Massie in the aforementioned book, the 17-year-old King Charles, in the summer of 1699, pushed himself to an unbearable point of excess and vowed never to touch another drop of liquor again. Apparently, writes Massie, the King stuck to beer thereafter, and even just drank beer when he was either wounded or post-battle. As for his relationship with his cousin Frederick, they remained on good terms, so much that King Charles gave him military assistance to defend Holstein-Gottorp from Danish invasion.

== Ancestry ==
Ancestors of Frederick IV of Holstein-Gottorp

8. John Adolf, Duke of Holstein-Gottorp
4. Frederick III, Duke of Holstein-Gottorp
9. Augusta of Denmark
2. Christian Albert, Duke of Holstein-Gottorp
10. John George I, Elector of Saxony
5. Marie Elisabeth of Saxony
11. Magdalene Sibylle of Prussia
1. Frederick IV, Duke of Holstein-Gottorp
12. Christian IV of Denmark
6. Frederick III of Denmark
13. Anne Catherine of Brandenburg
3. Frederikke Amalie of Denmark
14. George, Duke of Brunswick-Lüneburg
7. Sophie Amalie of Brunswick-Lüneburg
15. Anne Eleonore of Hesse-Darmstadt

== See also ==
- History of Schleswig-Holstein
- House of Holstein-Gottorp

Frederick of Schleswig-Holstein-Gottorp House of Holstein-Gottorp Cadet branch of the House of Oldenburg Born: 18 October 1671 Died: 19 July 1702
Regnal titles
Preceded by Christian Albert	Duke of Schleswig-Holstein-Gottorp; 1695-1702	Succeeded by Charles Frederick
Preceded by Christian Albert and Christian V as co-rulers	Duke of Holstein and Schleswig; 1695–1702 with Christian V (1695-1699); Frederick IV (1699-1702)	Succeeded by Charles Frederick and Frederick IV as co-rulers
