= Anna Sophia II, Abbess of Quedlinburg =

Anna Sophia II
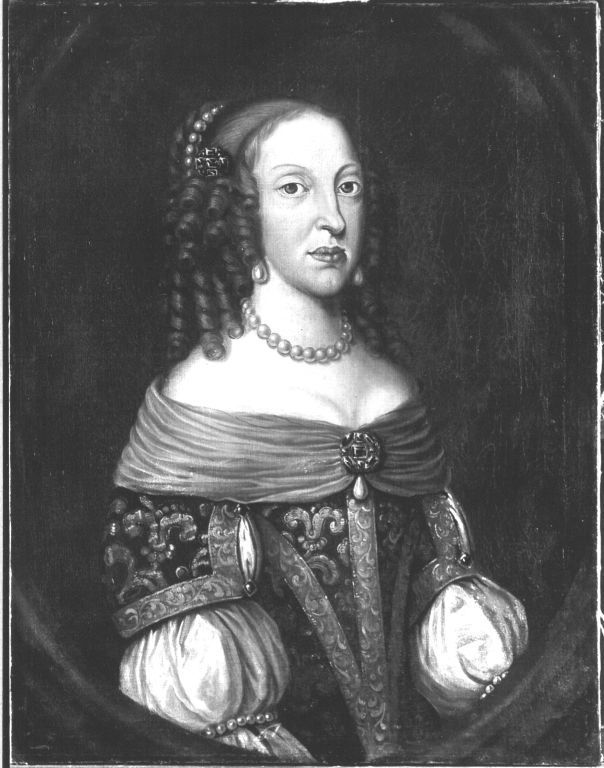
- Anna Sophia around 1650

Princess-Abbess of Quedlinburg
- Reign: 1681–1683
- Predecessor: Anna Sophia I
- Successor: Anna Dorothea
- Born: 17 December 1638; Marburg, Landgraviate of Hesse-Darmstadt
- Died: 13 December 1683 (aged 44); Quedlinburg Abbey
- House: Hesse-Darmstadt
- Father: George II, Landgrave of Hesse-Darmstadt
- Mother: Sophia Eleonore of Saxony
- Religion: Lutheranism

Landgravine Anna Sophia of Hesse-Darmstadt (17 December 1638 – 13 December 1683) was a German noblewoman who reigned as a Princess-Abbess of Quedlinburg under the name Anna Sophia II.

== Early life ==
Anna Sophia was a daughter of George II, Landgrave of Hesse-Darmstadt and his wife, Duchess Sophia Eleonore of Saxony. She was raised as a Lutheran, received a good education and grew up to be strictly religious.

== As writer ==
In 1655, at the age of 17, Anna Sophia entered the Quedlinburg Abbey. In 1658, she published a book of spiritual meditations called Der treue Seelenfreund Christus Jesus. At first, Lutheran theologians regarded her book as suspect; they argued that the book equalized women with men, but it was later approved. Anna Sophia justified her work, as was standard in the 17th century, by saying that it was God's order. Being an abbess and a Lutheran at the same time, Anna Sophia defended her choice to remain unmarried in her book. Her hymn Rede, liebster Jesu, rede was translated as Speak, O Lord, Thy Servant Heareth.

== As nun and abbess ==
Anna Sophia had a lapse of faith after her elder sister Landgravine Elisabeth Amalie of Hesse-Darmstadt converted to Roman Catholicism. She thought of leaving Quedlinburg to follow her sister's example but ultimately changed her mind.

In her later years, Anna Sophia suffered from a "chronic cough". Nevertheless, she was elected to succeed Anna Sophia I as princess-abbess of Quedlinburg in 1681 under the name Anna Sophia II. The sick abbess selected Duchess Anna Dorothea of Saxe-Weimar as her coadjutor in 1683.

== Death ==
Anna Sophia II succumbed to her illness (likely tuberculosis) later that year, on 13 December 1683, aged 44, after only two years of reign, and was succeeded by Anna Dorothea.

== Ancestry ==
Ancestors of Anna Sophia II, Abbess of Quedlinburg

16. Philip I, Landgrave of Hesse
8. George I, Landgrave of Hesse-Darmstadt
17. Christine of Saxony
4. Louis V, Landgrave of Hesse-Darmstadt
18. Bernhard VIII, Lord of Lippe
9. Magdalene of Lippe
19. Catherine of Waldeck-Eisenberg
2. George II, Landgrave of Hesse-Darmstadt
20. Joachim II Hector, Elector of Brandenburg
10. John George, Elector of Brandenburg (=26)
21. Magdalena of Saxony
5. Magdalene of Brandenburg
22. Joachim Ernst, Prince of Anhalt-Zerbst
11. Elisabeth of Anhalt-Zerbst
23. Agnes of Barby-Mühlingen
1. Anna Sophia II, Princess-Abbess of Quedlinburg
24. Augustus, Elector of Saxony
12. Christian I, Elector of Saxony
25. Anne of Denmark
6. John George I, Elector of Saxony
26. John George, Elector of Brandenburg (=10)
13. Sophie of Brandenburg
27. Sabina of Brandenburg-Ansbach
3. Duchess Sophia Eleonore of Saxony
28. Albert, Duke of Prussia
14. Albert Frederick, Duke of Prussia
29. Anna Marie of Brunswick-Lüneburg
7. Magdalene Sibylle of Prussia
30. Wilhelm, Duke of Jülich-Cleves-Berg
15. Marie Eleonore of Cleves
31. Archduchess Maria of Austria

Anna Sophia II House of Hesse-Darmstadt Cadet branch of the House of Hesse
Regnal titles
Preceded by Anna Sophia I	Princess-Abbess of Quedlinburg; 1681–1683	Succeeded by Anna Dorothea
