= Anna Dorothea, Abbess of Quedlinburg =

Anna Dorothea
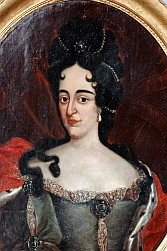

Princess-Abbess of Quedlinburg
- Reign: 4 September 1684 – 24 June 1704
- Predecessor: Anna Sophia II, Abbess of Quedlinburg
- Successor: Maria Aurora von Königsmarck (provost); Marie Elisabeth, Abbess of Quedlinburg
- Born: Duchess Anna Dorothea of Saxe-Weimar; 12 November 1657; Weimar
- Died: 24 June 1704 (aged 46)
- Burial: Weimar
- House: Wettin
- Father: John Ernest II, Duke of Saxe-Weimar
- Mother: Princess Christine Elisabeth of Schleswig-Holstein-Sonderburg

Duchess Anna Dorothea of Saxe-Weimar (12 November 1657 – 24 June 1704) reigned as Princess-Abbess of Quedlinburg from 1684 until her death.

== Early life and ancestry ==
Born in Weimar, into the Ernestine line of the House of Wettin, Duchess Anna Dorothea was the daughter of John Ernest II, Duke of Saxe-Weimar, and his wife, Princess Christine Elisabeth of Schleswig-Holstein-Sonderburg.

== Biography ==
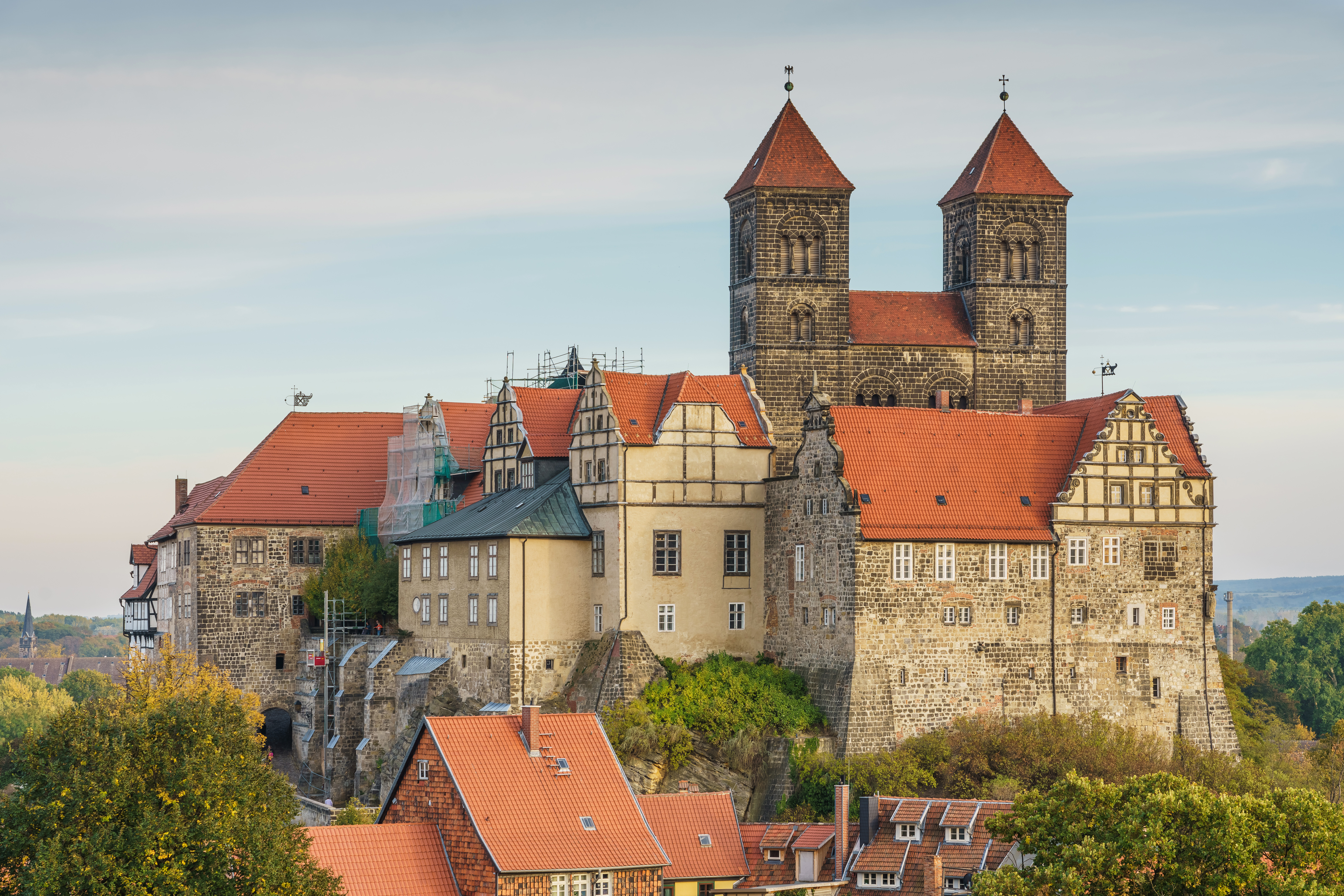
Castle and Collegiate Church in Quedlinburg, Germany

Her father decided she should pursue an ecclesiastical career when she was still a child. From 1681 until 1684, Anna Dorothea was provost of the Quedlinburg monasteries. Upon the death of Princess-Abbess Anna Sophia II, Anna Dorothea was chosen to succeed her, though not without difficulties that required the intervention of the abbey-principality's guardian and fellow Wettin, John George III, Elector of Saxony. The Elector consented to her election on 4 September 1684 and Holy Roman Emperor Leopold I confirmed it on 29 January 1685.

In 1698, Frederick Augustus I, who had succeeded to the Electorate of Saxony in 1694 and had been elected King of Poland in 1697, found himself in need of money as the election had cost him a fortune. The King of Poland therefore decided to sell his rights of guardianship of the abbey-principality to Elector Frederick III of Brandenburg.

The change was not welcomed by the citizens of Quedlinburg nor by the Princess-Abbess, as it led to diminishing of her power and loss of many of the abbey-principality's possessions. The Princess-Abbess protested against the sale and refused to recognise the Elector of Brandenburg as the abbey-principality's new guardian until military occupation the same year forced her to do so. As many of her predecessors, she often came into conflicts with the Council of the City of Quedlinburg and her guardian.

== Death ==
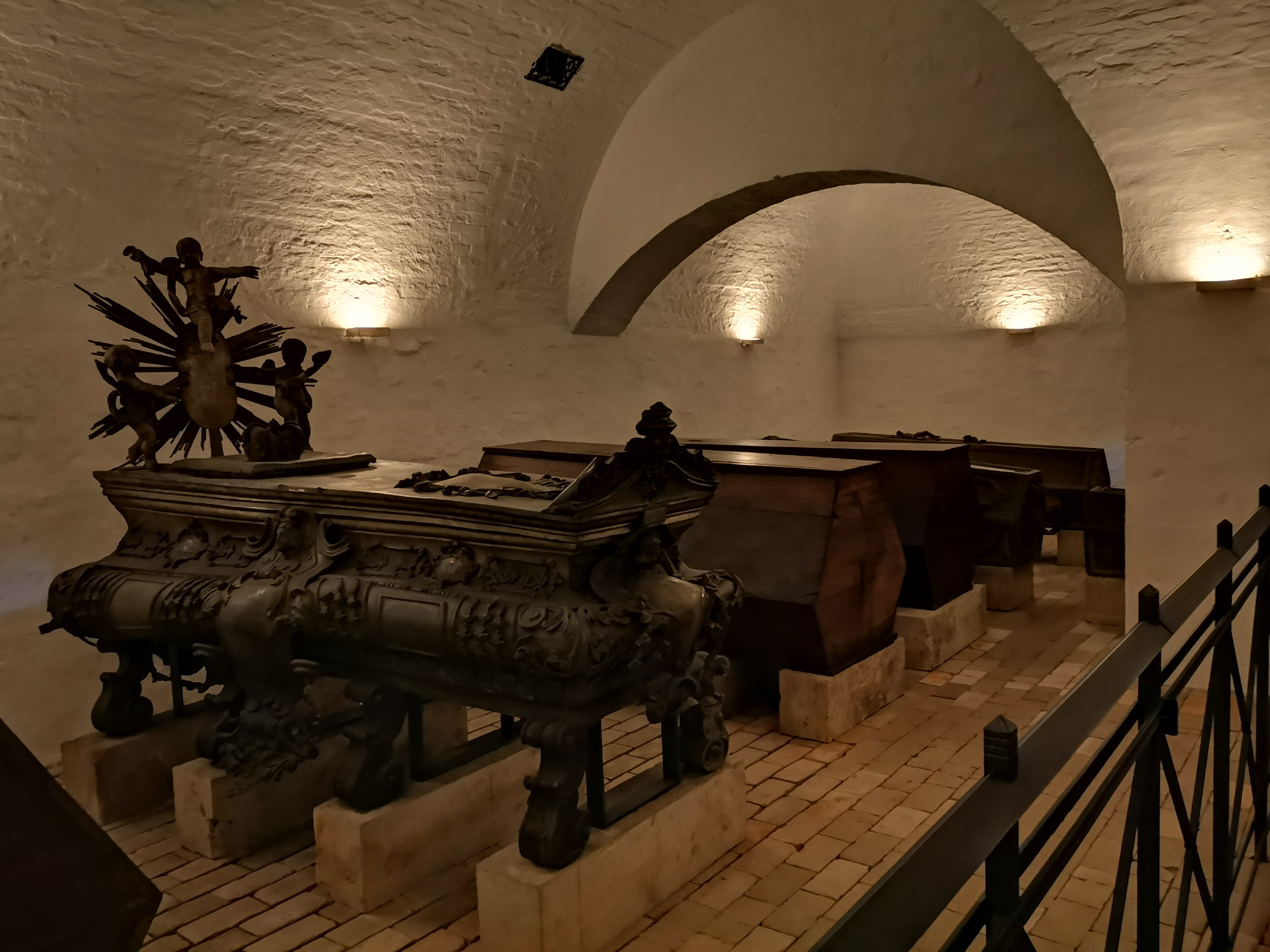
Ducal family vault

Anna Dorothea suffered poor health in 1703 and went to Carlsbad to recover, but without success. She died the next year, on 24 June 1704, aged 47. Her body was buried in the Ducal family vault (Fürstengruft), Weimar, Germany.

== Bibliography ==
- Fritsch, Johann Heinrich: Geschichte des vormaligen Reichsstifts und der Stadt Quedlinburg. Quedlinburg 1828
- Lorenz, Hermann: Werdegang von Stift und Stadt Quedlinburg. In: Quedlinburgische Geschichte. Quedlinburg 1922 (Volume 1)

Anna Dorothea House of Wettin
Regnal titles
Preceded by Anna Sophia II	Princess-Abbess of Quedlinburg; 1684–1704	Vacant Office of provost held by Maria Aurora von Königsmarck Title next held by Marie Elisabeth
