= Anna Sophia I, Abbess of Quedlinburg =

Dutch abbess (1619–1680)

Anna Sophia I
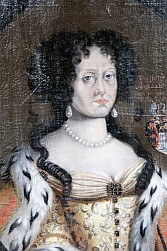

Princess-Abbess of Quedlinburg
- Reign: 15 July 1645–1 September 1680
- Predecessor: Dorothea Sophia, Abbess of Quedlinburg
- Successor: Landgravine Anna Sophia of Hesse-Darmstadt
- Born: 2 April 1619; Birkenfeld
- Died: 1 September 1680 (aged 61)
- House: Wittelsbach
- Father: George William, Count Palatine of Zweibrücken-Birkenfeld
- Mother: Countess Dorothea of Solms-Sonnenwalde

Countess Palatine Anna Sophia of Zweibrücken-Birkenfeld (2 April 1619 – 1 September 1680) reigned as Princess-Abbess of Quedlinburg and, as such, she is referred to as Anna Sophia I. She was the author of a book of meditations, Der treue Seelenfreund Christus, first published in Jena in 1658.

Anna Sophia was born in Birkenfeld to George William, Count Palatine of Zweibrücken-Birkenfeld, and his first wife, Countess Dorothea of Solms-Sonnenwalde. The young countess palatine pursued an ecclesiastical career and was appointed princess-abbess of Quedlinburg on 15 July 1645, succeeding Princess-Abbess Dorothea Sophia. She succeeded to the abbey-principality during the Thirty Years' War, which ended in 1648, and her small territory suffered invasion of the Swedish army. Anna Sophia I often came into conflicts with John George II, Elector of Saxony, and the Quedlinburg city council.

Upon her death in Quedlinburg Abbey, she was succeeded by Landgravine Anna Sophia of Hesse-Darmstadt who reigned as Anna Sophia II.

Anna Sophia I House of Wittelsbach
Regnal titles
Preceded by Dorothea Sophia	Princess-Abbess of Quedlinburg; 1645–1680	Succeeded by Anna Sophia II
