= Anna Sophia Polak =

Jewish feminist and author

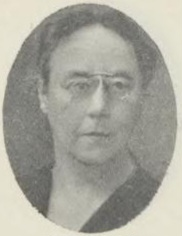
- Born: April 27, 1874; Rotterdam, Netherlands
- Died: February 26, 1943 (aged 68); Auschwitz-Birkenau, German-occupied Poland

Anna Sophia Polak (27 April 1874 — 26 February 1943) was a Jewish feminist and author. She was the director of the National Bureau of Women’s Labor from 1908 to 1936. She was murdered in Auschwitz concentration camp.

== Biography ==
Polak was a daughter of Herman Joseph Polak, professor of Greek language and literature in Groningen, and Louisa Helena Stibbe. She was educated at the Hogere Burgerschool for girls in Rotterdam and took the gymnasium final exam as an extranea in 1893. The family moved to Groningen where her father received an appointment as a professor in 1894.

Around 1900 she began to take an interest in women's issues, including through her Toynbee work, and in 1898 she helped Catherina Geertruida Doijer organize the National Exhibition of Women's Labor, held in The Hague in 1898. With the proceeds of the exhibition, twenty thousand guilders, the National Association for Women's Labor was founded. In her ideas about women's emancipation, Polak was strongly influenced by Catharine van Tussenbroek. After the exhibition, she wrote a book, Vrouwenwerk in Nederland, Beschouwingen over eenige zijden der Vrouwenbeweging, which was published in 1902.

In 1904 Polak became a board member of the National Association for Women's Labor, and in 1908 she became director of the National Bureau for Women's Labor (NBV). With deputy director Marie Heinen, she did pioneering work for the position of women in the Netherlands. The Bureau collected documentation on women's professions, organized information, consultations and many publications, including 55 brochures written by Polak. From 1920 to 1925 she was active as chairman of the Permanent Committee for Women's Labor of the International Women's Council. From 1927 to 1932 she was president of the National Women's Council. In addition, she held a number of other positions in important organizations such as the Supreme Council of Labor.

In 1936 Polak became ill; she showed signs of dementia and was honorably discharged. In 1941, she was admitted to the Oud Rozenburg psychiatric institution in The Hague. In 1943, the Germans took her to Westerbork. On Feb. 23, 1943, she was put on a transport to Auschwitz concentration camp. The train trip from Westerbork took three days. On Feb. 26, the train arrived at the death camp; Polak was murdered that same day.
