= Christian Albert, Duke of Holstein-Gottorp =

Duke of Holstein-Gottorp from 1659 to 1695

Christian Albert
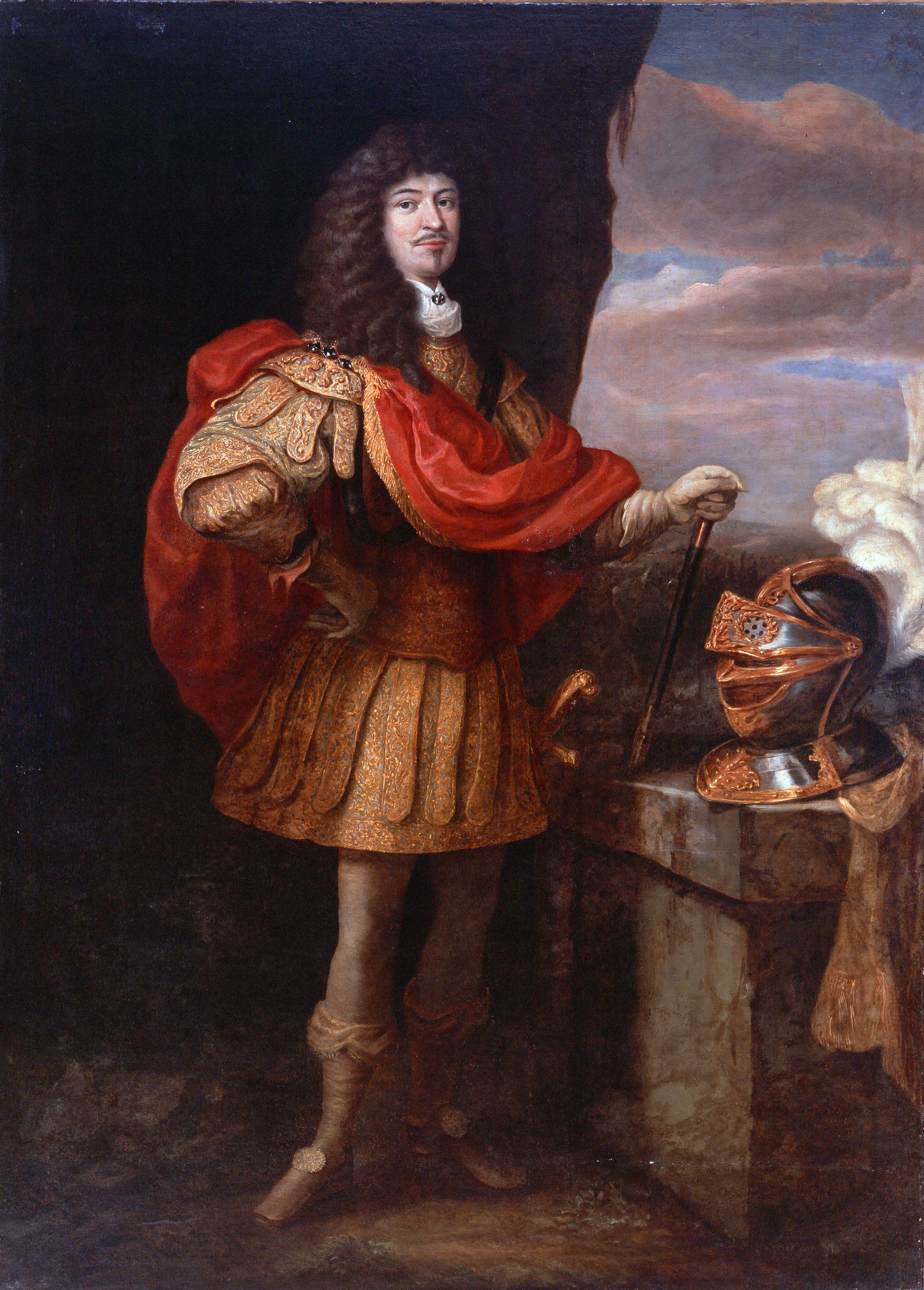

Duke of Holstein-Gottorp
- Reign: 10 August 1659 – 6 January 1695
- Predecessor: Frederick III
- Successor: Frederick IV
- Born: 13 February 1641; Gottorp
- Died: 6 January 1695 (aged 53); Gottorp
- Burial: Schleswig Cathedral
- Spouse: Princess Frederica Amalia of Denmark (m. 1667)
- Issue: Sophie Amalie, Hereditary Princess of Brunswick-Wolfenbüttel; Frederick IV, Duke of Holstein-Gottorp; Christian August, Prince-Bishop of Lübeck; Marie Elisabeth, Abbess of Quedlinburg
- House: Holstein-Gottorp
- Father: Frederick III, Duke of Holstein-Gottorp
- Mother: Marie Elisabeth of Saxony

Christian Albert (13 February [O.S. 3 February] 1641, Gottorp – 6 January 1695 [O.S. 27 December 1694], Gottorp) was a duke of Holstein-Gottorp and bishop of Lübeck.

== Biography ==
Christian Albert was a son of Frederick III, Duke of Holstein-Gottorp, and his wife Princess Marie Elisabeth of Saxony. He became duke when his father died in the Castle Tönning, besieged by the King Christian V of Denmark. He was forced to flee at that point, and the remainder of his life was characterized by his fight with Denmark. In 1667, he married Princess Frederica Amalia, daughter of King Frederick III of Denmark. The marital alliance was arranged in the hope for peace, but it changed nothing.

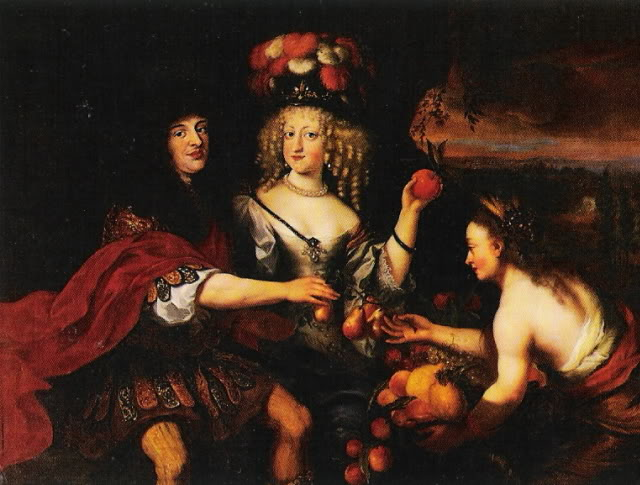
The duke and his wife Frederica Amalia.

During Christian Albert's reign, the connection with Sweden, initiated by his father, was strengthened, which provided some protection. However, this also led to the duchy being pulled into all of Sweden's conflicts, including the Great Northern War and several wars with Denmark. From 1675 to 1689, Christian Albert lived in exile in Hamburg. However, with the aid of the Holy Roman Emperor and the European allies, he managed to force the Danish king to sign the so-called Altonaer Vergleich in 1689, which allowed him to regain his former position.

Christian Albert made some contribution to culture, education and the arts. On 5 October 1665, he founded the University of Kiel. In 1678, he took part in the founding of the Hamburg Oper am Gänsemarkt. Both he and his father, Frederick III, extended patronage to the painter Jürgen Ovens, who worked for more than thirty years with them.

== Family and children ==
Christian Albert married, on 24 October 1667, Princess Frederica Amalia of Denmark, daughter of King Frederick III of Denmark and Sophie Amalie of Brunswick-Lüneburg. They had four children:

1. Sophie Amalie (19 January 1670 – 27 February 1710), married on 7 July 1695 to Prince Augustus William, Duke of Brunswick-Wolfenbüttel.
2. Duke Frederick IV of Holstein-Gottorp (18 October 1671 – 19 July 1702), patrilineal ancestor of all Russian emperors after Catherine II.
3. Duke Christian August of Holstein-Gottorp (11 January 1673 – 24 April 1726), whose eldest-surviving son established a new dynasty in Sweden.
4. Marie Elisabeth (21 March 1678 – 17 July 1755), Abbess of Quedlinburg.

Agnatic progeny of his elder son ended up on the throne of Russia, and agnatic progeny of the younger son – on the thrones of Sweden and Oldenburg.

== See also ==
- History of Schleswig-Holstein

== Ancestors ==
Ancestors of Christian Albert, Duke of Holstein-Gottorp

16. Frederick I of Denmark
8. Adolf, Duke of Holstein-Gottorp
17. Sophie of Pomerania
4. John Adolf, Duke of Holstein-Gottorp
18. Philip I, Landgrave of Hesse
9. Christine of Hesse
19. Christine of Saxony
2. Frederick III, Duke of Holstein-Gottorp
20. Christian III of Denmark
10. Frederick II of Denmark
21. Dorothea of Saxe-Lauenburg
5. Augusta of Denmark
22. Ulrich III of Mecklenburg-Güstrow
11. Sophie of Mecklenburg-Güstrow
23. Elizabeth of Denmark
1. Christian Albert, Duke of Holstein-Gottorp
24. Augustus, Elector of Saxony
12. Christian I, Elector of Saxony
25. Anne of Denmark, Electress of Saxony
6. John George I, Elector of Saxony
26. John George, Elector of Brandenburg
13. Sophie of Brandenburg
27. Sabina of Brandenburg-Ansbach
3. Duchess Marie Elisabeth of Saxony
28. Albert, Duke of Prussia
14. Albert Frederick, Duke of Prussia
29. Anna Marie of Brunswick-Lüneburg
7. Magdalene Sibylle of Prussia
30. William, Duke of Jülich-Cleves-Berg
15. Marie Eleonore of Cleves
31. Archduchess Maria of Austria

Christian Albert, Duke of Holstein-Gottorp House of Holstein-Gottorp Cadet branch of the House of Oldenburg Born: 3 February 1641 Died: 6 January 1695
Regnal titles
Religious titles
Preceded by John X	Prince-Bishop of Lübeck (Lutheran Administrator); 1655–1666	Succeeded by Augustus Frederick
Regnal titles
Preceded by Frederick III	— TITULAR — Duke of Holstein-Gottorp; 1659–1695	Succeeded by Frederick IV
Preceded by Frederick III (Denmark-Norway) and Frederick III (Gottorp)	Duke of Holstein and Schleswig; 1659–1695 with Frederick III (1659–1670); Christian V (1670–1695)	Succeeded by Christian V and Frederick IV
