= Princess Frederica Amalia of Denmark =

Duchess of Holstein-Gottorp from 1667 to 1695

Frederica Amalia of Denmark and Norway
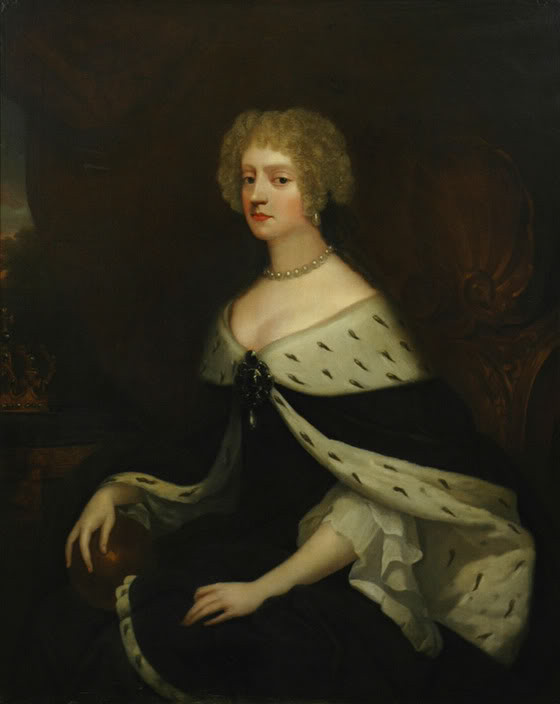

Duchess consort of Holstein-Gottorp
- Tenure: 24 October 1667 – 6 January 1695
- Born: 11 April 1649; Copenhagen, Denmark
- Died: 30 October 1704 (aged 55); Kiel, Germany
- Burial: Schleswig Cathedral
- Spouse: Christian Albert, Duke of Holstein-Gottorp (m. 1667; died 1695)
- Issue: Sophie Amalie, Duchess of Brunswick-Lüneburg; Frederick IV, Duke of Holstein-Gottorp; Christian August, Duke of Holstein-Gottorp; Marie Elisabeth, Abbess of Quedlinburg
- House: Oldenburg
- Father: Frederick III of Denmark
- Mother: Sophie Amalie of Brunswick-Lüneburg

Princess Frederica Amalia of Denmark and Norway (11 April 1649 – 30 October 1704) was the second daughter of King Frederick III of Denmark and Sophie Amalie of Brunswick-Lüneburg, and Duchess of Holstein-Gottorp from 1667 to 1695 as the consort of Duke Christian Albert.

== Life ==
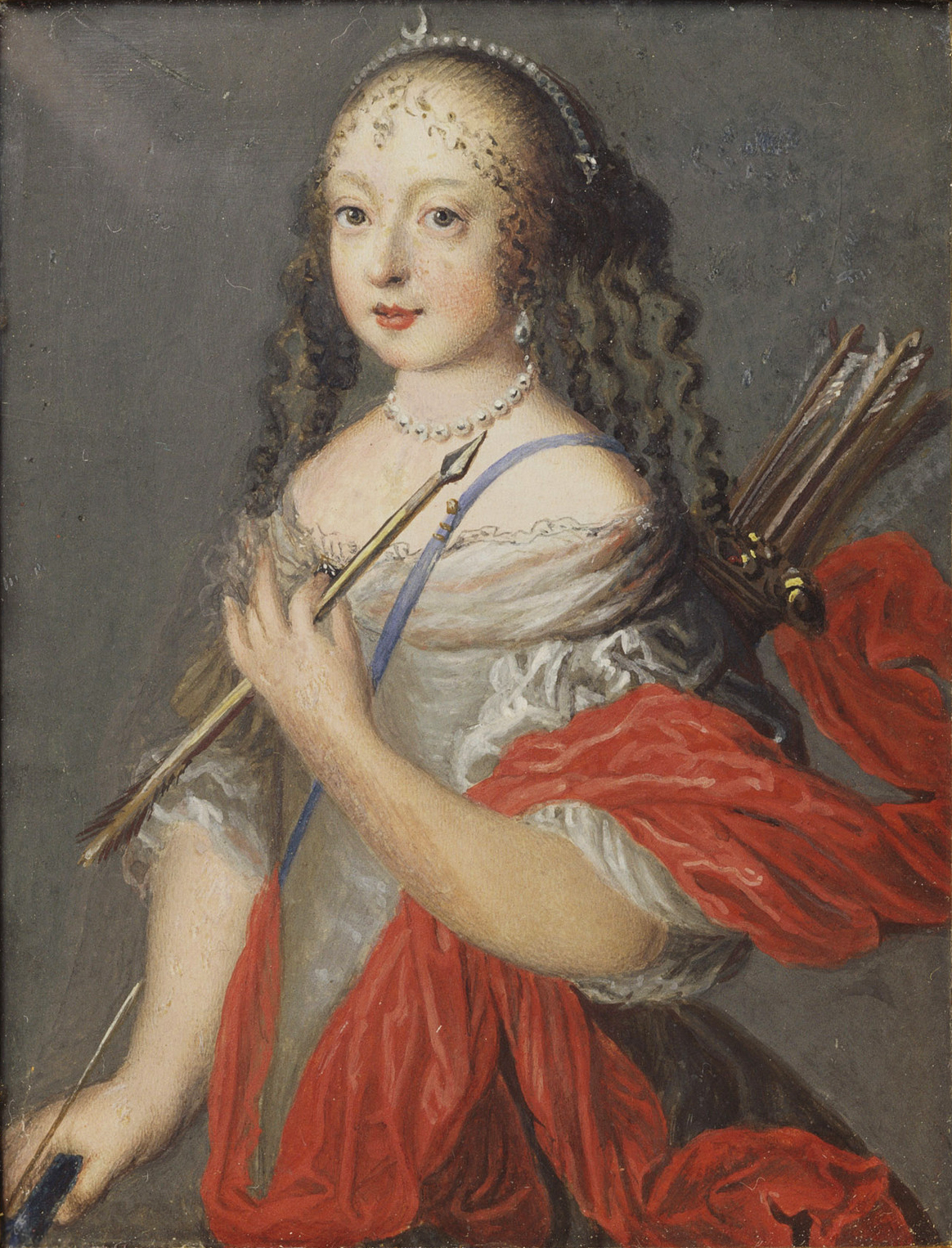
Frederica portrayed in her youth at the Danish court

Frederica Amalie was a daughter of King Frederick III of Denmark and his wife, Sophie Amalie of Brunswick-Lüneburg. Her father had been crowned king on 23 November 1648, about five months before she was born.

She was married at Glücksburg Castle on 24 October 1667 to Duke Christian Albert of Holstein-Gottorp as part of a peace treaty between Denmark and Holstein-Gottorp, but the hostile parties continued to fight. The marriage was unhappy, with Frederica Amalia often tormented by the frequent disagreements between her brother, Christian V of Denmark, and her spouse. She was reportedly well known to be badly treated by Christian Albert, while the Danish royal family gave her all sorts of personal privileges and proofs of affection.

The couple visited her sister, the Swedish queen Ulrika Eleonora. Her visits to Sweden inspired great parties and festivities at the otherwise strict Swedish court, and were much appreciated. She became a widow in 1695. As her sons were also anti-Danish, the conflict between Denmark and Holstein-Gottorp continued to put her in a difficult position also as a widow; when she died in her residence in Kiel in 1704, a conflict between Holstein-Gottorp and Denmark about the proper way to ring the bells at her funeral almost provoked war between the two states.

== Issue ==
With Christian Albert, Duke of Holstein-Gottorp, she had four children:

1. Sophie Amalie (19 January 1670 – 27 February 1710), married on 7 July 1695 to Duke Augustus William of Brunswick-Lüneburg. No issue.
2. Frederick (18 October 1671 – 19 July 1702), succeeded his father as Duke Frederick IV of Holstein-Gottorp.
3. Christian August (11 January 1673 – 24 April 1726), succeeded his brother as Duke Christian August of Holstein-Gottorp. Grandfather of Catherine the Great
4. Marie Elisabeth (21 March 1678 – 17 July 1755), Abbess of Quedlinburg.

== Ancestors ==
Ancestors of Princess Frederica Amalia of Denmark

8. Frederick II of Denmark
4. Christian IV of Denmark
9. Sophie of Mecklenburg-Güstrow
2. Frederick III of Denmark
10. Joachim Frederick, Elector of Brandenburg
5. Anne Catherine of Brandenburg
11. Catherine of Brandenburg-Küstrin
1. Frederikke Amalie of Denmark
12. William, Duke of Brunswick-Lüneburg
6. George, Duke of Brunswick-Lüneburg
13. Dorothea of Denmark
3. Sophie Amalie of Brunswick-Lüneburg
14. Louis V, Landgrave of Hesse-Darmstadt
7. Anne Eleonore of Hesse-Darmstadt
15. Magdalene of Brandenburg

Royal titles
Preceded by Marie Elisabeth of Saxony	Duchess consort of Holstein-Gottorp; 1667-1695	Succeeded by Hedvig Sophia of Sweden
