= Duchess Maria Elisabeth of Saxony =

Duchess of Holstein-Gottorp from 1630 to 1659

Duchess Marie Elisabeth of Saxony

Duchess consort of Holstein-Gottorp
- Tenure: 21 February 1630 - 10 August 1659
- Born: 22 November 1610; Dresden
- Died: 24 October 1684 (aged 73); Schloss Husum
- Spouse: Frederick III, Duke of Holstein-Gottorp (m. 1630; died 1659)
- Issue: Sophie Augusta, Princess of Anhalt-Zerbst; Magdalena Sibylla, Duchess of Mecklenburg-Güstrow; Maria Elisabeth, Landgravine of Hesse-Darmstadt; Prince Frederick; Hedwig Eleonora, Queen of Sweden; Prince John George; Princess Anna Dorothea; Christian Albert, Duke of Holstein-Gottorp; Augustus Frederick, Prince-Regent of Eutin; Augusta Marie, Margravine of Baden-Durlach
- House: Wettin (Albertine Line) (by birth); Holstein-Gottorp (by marriage)
- Father: John George I, Elector of Saxony
- Mother: Magdalene Sibylle of Prussia
- Religion: Lutheranism

Duchess Marie Elisabeth of Saxony (22 November 1610 – 24 October 1684) was a duchess consort of Holstein-Gottorp as the spouse of Duke Frederick III of Holstein-Gottorp. As a widow, she became known as a patron of culture.

== Biography ==
She was a daughter of John George I, Elector of Saxony and his spouse, Princess Magdalene Sibylle of Prussia. She was engaged in 1627 and married in 1630. Her marriage was arranged by the Danish queen dowager Sophie and the dowager duchess of Saxony, Hedwig of Denmark. In her dowry, she brought paintings by Lucas Cranach the Elder.

In 1659, she became a widow; she moved to Wittum Husum Castle in 1660. Her household at Husum became renowned as a culture center, and she herself a noted patron. She produced an interpretation of the Bible in 1664.

== Marriage and issue ==
Marie Elisabeth was married on 21 February 1630 to Duke Friedrich III of Holstein-Gottorp and gave birth to sixteen children in just over eighteen years, ten of whom lived to adulthood:

1. Sofie Auguste (5 December 1630 – 12 December 1680), married on 16 September 1649 to John VI, Prince of Anhalt-Zerbst. Mother of John Louis I, Prince of Anhalt-Dornburg, grandmother of Christian August, Prince of Anhalt-Zerbst, and great-grandmother of Catherine II of Russia.
2. Magdalene Sibylle (24 November 1631 – 22 September 1719), married on 28 November 1654 to Gustav Adolph, Duke of Mecklenburg-Güstrow. Mother of Louise of Mecklenburg-Güstrow, Queen of Denmark.
3. Johann Adolf (29 September 1632 – 19 November 1633), died in early childhood.
4. Marie Elisabeth (6 June 1634 – 17 June 1665), married on 24 November 1650 to Louis VI, Landgrave of Hesse-Darmstadt.
5. Friedrich (17 July 1635 – 12 August 1654), died unmarried.
6. Hedwig Eleonore (23 October 1636 – 24 November 1715), married on 24 October 1654 to King Charles X of Sweden.
7. Adolf August (1 September 1637 – 20 November 1637), died in infancy.
8. Johann Georg (8 August 1638 – 25 November 1655), died unmarried.
9. Anna Dorothea (13 February 1640 – 13 May 1713), died unmarried.
10. Christian Albert, Duke of Holstein-Gottorp (3 February 1641 – 6 January 1695), married on 24 October 1667 to Princess Frederica Amalia of Denmark.
11. Gustav Ulrich (16 March 1642 – 23 October 1642), died in infancy.
12. Christine Sabine (11 July 1643 – 20 March 1644), died in infancy.
13. August Friedrich (6 May 1646 – 2 October 1705), Prince-Regent of Eutin and Prince-Bishop of Lübeck; married on 21 June 1676 to Christine of Saxe-Weissenfels (daughter of Augustus, Duke of Saxe-Weissenfels, and his first wife Anna Maria of Mecklenburg-Schwerin); no issue.
14. Adolf (24 August 1647 – 27 December 1647), died in infancy.
15. Elisabeth Sofie (24 August 1647 – 16 November 1647), twin of Adolf, died in infancy.
16. Augusta Marie (6 February 1649 – 25 April 1728), married on 15 May 1670 to Frederick VII, Margrave of Baden-Durlach.

Via her daughters Augusta Marie and Magdalene Sibylle, Marie Elisabeth is the most recent common matrilineal ancestor of Queen Victoria of the United Kingdom and Catherine the Great of Russia.

Royal titles
Preceded by Augusta of Denmark	Duchess consort of Holstein-Gottorp; 1630–1659	Succeeded by Frederika Amalia of Denmark
