= Brolæggerstræde 4 =

Listed building in Copenhagen

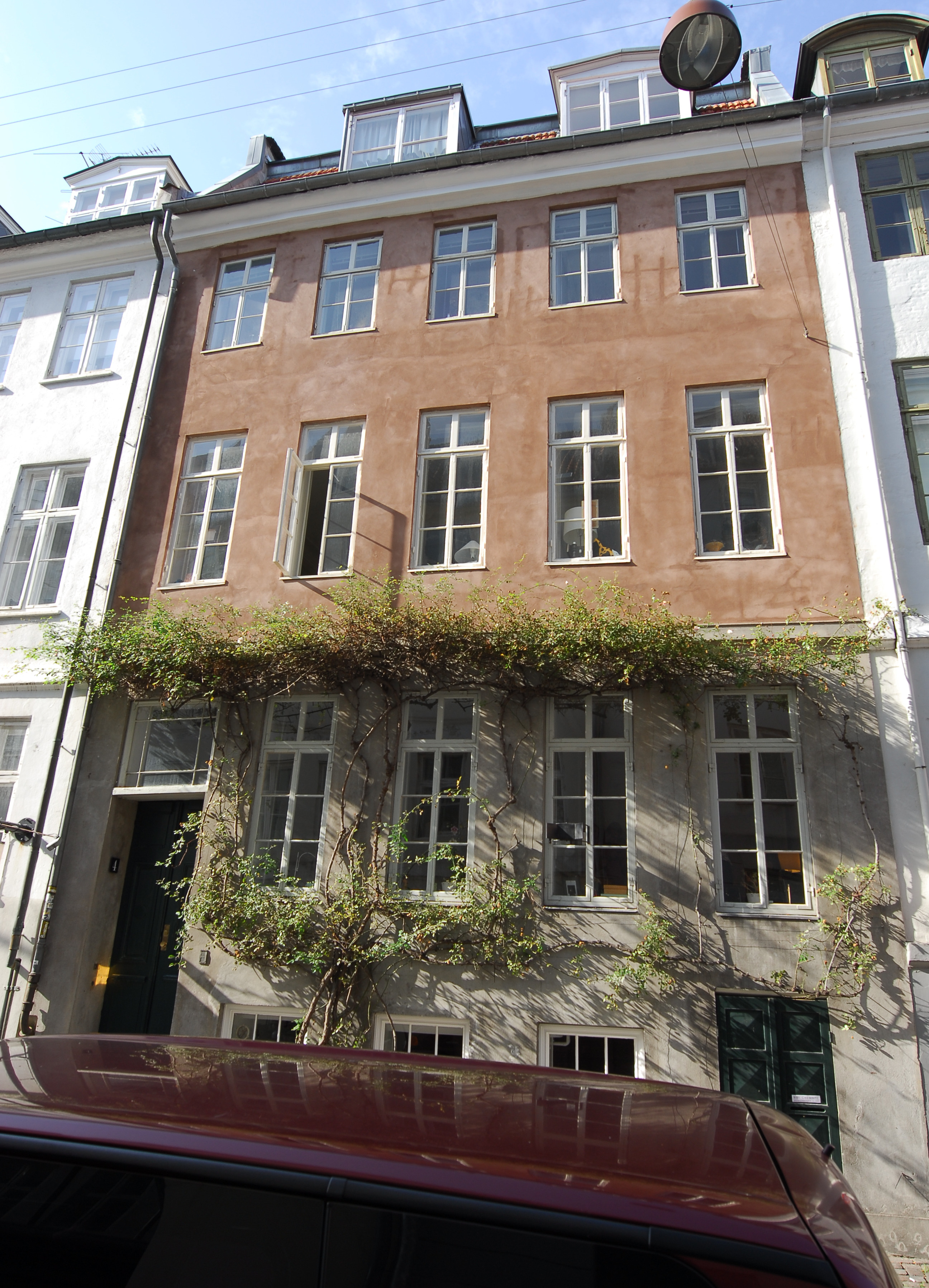
- Interactive map of the Brolæggerstræde 4 area

General information
- Location: Copenhagen, Denmark
- Coordinates: 55°40′40.4″N 12°34′30.36″E
- Completed: 1797

Brolæggerstræde 4 is a Neoclassical property situated in the Old Town of Copenhagen, Denmark. Like most of the other buildings in the area, it was constructed as part of the rebuilding of the city following the Copenhagen Fire of 1795. The three-winged complex was listed in the Danish registry of protected buildings and places in 1950.

== History ==
=== 18th century ===
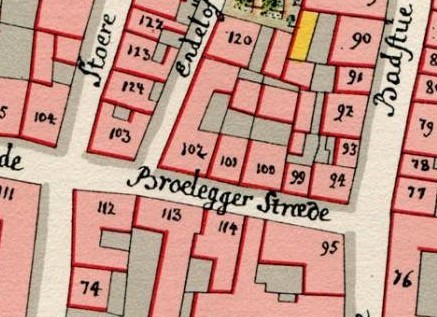
No. 1100 seen on Gedde's district map of Snaren's Quarter from 1757

The Tailor's Guild Hall was located at the site from 1512. The property was listed in Copenhagen's first cadastre of 1689 as No. 117 in Snaren's Quarter. Together with most of the other buildings in the area, the property was destroyed in the Copenhagen Fire of 1728. The Tailors' Guild Hall was not rebuilt after the fire. The Tailor's Guild sold the property in 1838 and a new guild hall was constructed on Gammelholm some ten years later. The eastern part of the old No. 117 was listed in the new cadastre of 1756 as No. 100 in Sbaren's Quarter, owned by tailor Johan Ibsen. The western part of the old No. 117 was, together with the old No. 134, divided into No. 101, No. 102 and No. 120.

No. 100 was home to 28 residents in four households at the 1787 census. Jørgen Eiberg, a chairmaker and the owner of the property, resided there with his wife Dorte Elisabet Rasmus Datter, two chairmakers, two chairmaker's apprentices and one maid. Lars Christian Jørgensen, a royal cellarman, resided in the building with his wife Anne Marie Neuhausen and their six-year-old son Hans Christian Jørgensen. Anne Marie Smidt (née Fuus), a 60-year-old teacher at the new Indfødsskolen No. 1 in Vimmelskaftet, resided in the building with her sister Mette Kirstine Fuus, one maid and three lodgers (aged 11 to 40). Mads Larsen, a workman in the royal wine cellar and tobacconist, resided in the building with his wife Ellen Marie Peders Datter, their two-year-old son Peder Christian Larsen, a maid and the wife's disabled sister Juliane Maria Peders Datter.

The property was, together with most of the other buildings in the area, destroyed in the Copenhagen Fire of 1795. The present building on the site was constructed by master mason Anton Christopher Wilcken in 1796–1797.

=== 19th century ===
At the time of the 1801 census, No. 100 was home to a total of 20 people distributed among four households. Søren Andersen Bjerg, a distiller and the owner of the property, resided there with his wife Kirstine Marie Holst, their two children (aged two and three), his niece (aged four), his mother-in-law Magdalene Schiønberg, a maid and two distillery workers. Mads Sørensen Schalstrup, a shoemaker, resided in the building with his wife Margrethe Juhl. Lorentz Peter Bagger, an inspector (kontrollør), resided in the building with his wife Ernestine Wilhelmine Bagger, their one-year-old daughter Henriette Lorentze Bagger, the 12-year-old daughter from the wife's first marriage Johanne Marie Møller and one maid. Thomas Herman Lange, a commissioner (kommisær), resided in the building with his wife Cathrine Lovise Bager, their six-year-old son Thomas Herman Lange and one maid.

The property was listed as No. 78 in the new cadastre of 1806. It was still owned by Søren Andersen Bierre then.

At the time of the 1840 census, No. 78 was home to a total of 48 people. Most of them were craftsmen (none of them master craftsmen), workmen or other people from the lower middle-class.

With the introduction of house numbering by street in Copenhagen in 1859, No. 78 was listed as No. 4. At the time of the 1960 census the following year, it was home to 12 people in the front wing and another 15 people in the rear wing. C. P. Gelsou, a master joiner, resided on the second floor with his wife Ida Christensen, their 13-year-old son C. F. Gelsou and one lodger. Marie Oerloff, a 55-year-old widow needleworker, resided on the ground floor with her 12-year-old daughter Emma Oerloff and one maid. Anders Neilsen, a workman, resided in the basement with his wife Amalie Hansen and three children (aged one to five).

=== 20th century ===
At the time of the 1906 census, Brolæggerstræde 4 was home to a total of 16 people. Marie Kirstine Hougaard (née Danielsen), a 45-year-old widow tailor, resided in the front wing with her son Jens Einar August Hougaard. Vilh Sahm Frandsen, a klein smith, resided on the second floor with his wife Anna Sahm Frandsen and their three daughters (aged six to 20). Marie Jørgine Jensen and Johan Ludvig Frederik Grammelstoff resided on the third floor of the front wing. August Svend Olsen and Jacob Knudsen, two workers, resided on the first floor of the rear wing. Ole Larsen, a shoemaker, resided on the second floor of the rear wing with his needleworker Olga Kristin Larsen, worker Søren Kristian Frederik Ridder, worker Carl Frederik Sander and coachman Rechard Axel Petersen.

The former warehouse in the courtyard was adapted for use as housing in the 1869s.

== Architecture ==
Brolæggerstræde 4 is a three winged complex, constructed with three storeys over a walk-out basement, consisting of a five-bay front wing towards the street, a two bay perpendicular wing along one side of a small courtyard (or light well and a rear wing (former warehouse). The ground floor is below a belt course plastered and painted in a brown colour. The upper part of the facade is plastered in a terracotta colour. The roof is a mansard roof with two dormer windows towards the street and one dormer window towards the yard.

== Today ==
The property is currently owned by E/F Brolæggerstræde 4.
