= Chemnitz (disambiguation) =

Chemnitz is a city in Saxony, Germany.

Chemnitz may also refer to:

== Places ==
- Chemnitz (region), one of the former regions of Saxony, disbanded 2012
- Chemnitz (river), river in Saxony, Germany
- Chemnitzer Land, former district in Saxony, Germany

== People with the surname ==
- Aaja Chemnitz (born 1977), Greenlandic politician
- Bibi Chemnitz (born 1983), Greenlandic fashion designer
- Johann Hieronymus Chemnitz (1730–1800), German theologian and natural scientist
- Martin Chemnitz (1522–1586), German Lutheran theologian

== Other ==
- SS Chemnitz, steamship of the North German Lloyd line

== See also ==
- Dorfchemnitz
- Kemnitz
