= Brolæggerstræde 6 =

Building in Copenhagen, Denmark

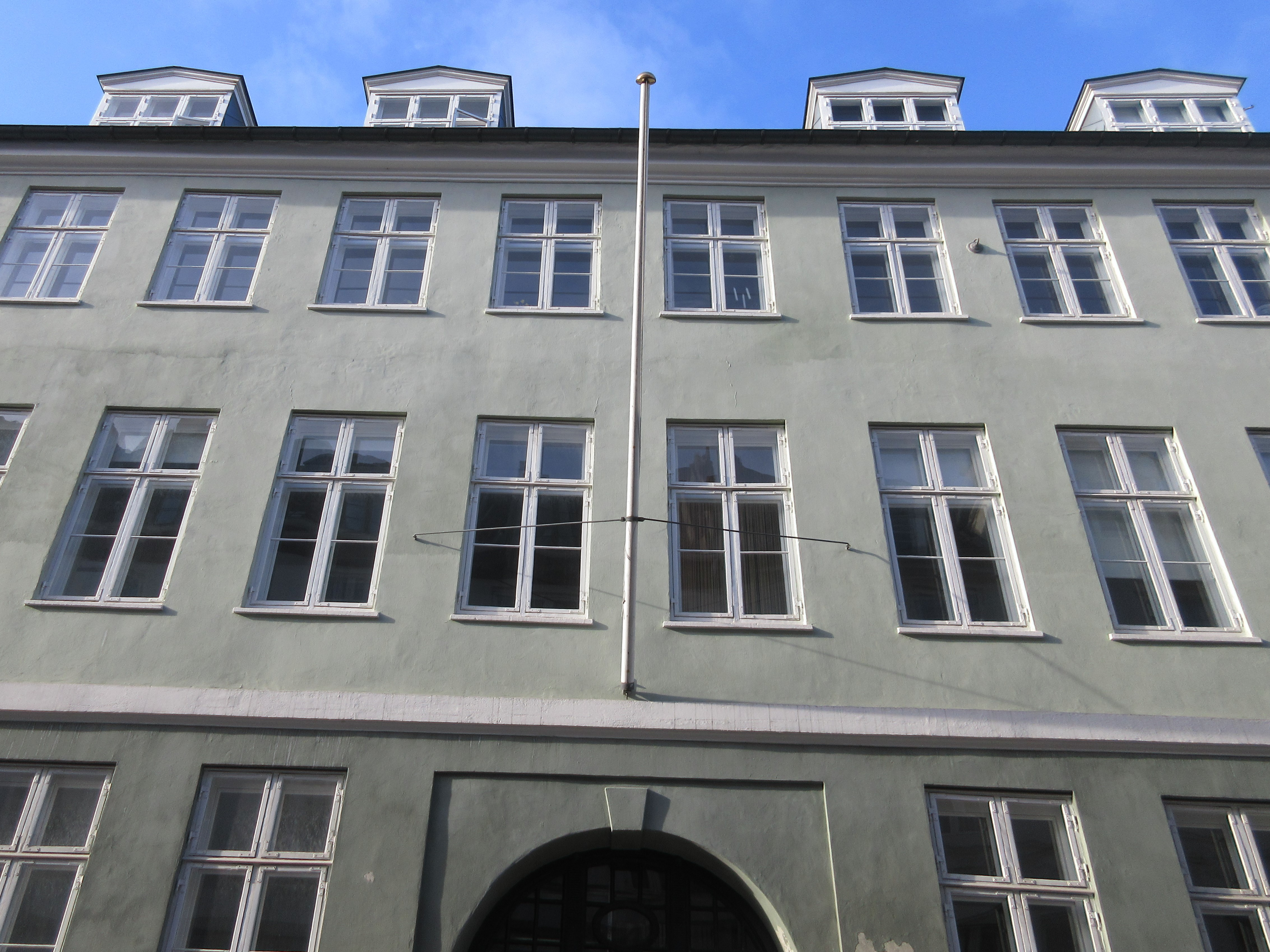
- Interactive map of the Brolæggerstræde 6 area

General information
- Location: Copenhagen, Denmark
- Coordinates: 55°40′40.19″N 12°34′29.78″E
- Completed: 1798

Brolæggerstræde 6 is a Neoclassical property situated in the Old Town of Copenhagen, Denmark. It was listed in the Danish registry of protected buildings and places in 1950. Former residents include the later bishop Jacob Peter Mynster and the politician Balthazar Christensen.

== History ==
=== 18th century ===
In the late 17th century the site was part of two separate properties situated at the corner of Brolæggerstræde and the street Endeløsstræde, which no longer exists. The Tailor's Guild Hall occupied the part of the site that bordered on Brolæggerstræde. This property was listed as No. 118 in Snaren's Quarter (Snarens Kvarter) in 1689. The adjacent site in Endeløsstræde was listed as No. 134 in Snaren's Quarter in 1689, owned by Henrik Schultz.

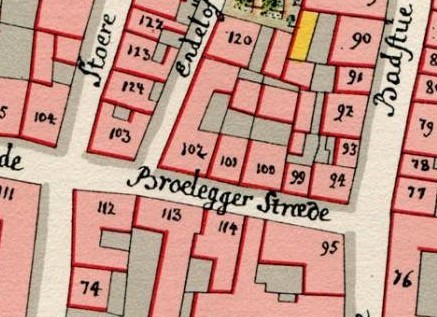
No. 101, No. 102 and No. 120 seen on Gedde's district map of Snaren's Quarter from 1757

Together with most of the other buildings in the area, the two properties were destroyed in the Copenhagen Fire of 1728. The old No. 134 and the western part of No. 117 were subsequently divided into three smaller properties. The corner property was listed as No. 102 in 1756, owned by distiller Niels Rasmussen. The adjacent property in Brolæggerstræde was listed as No. 101, owned by Ulrik Larsen Bruun. The adjacent property in Endeløsstræde was listed as No. 120, owned by goldsmith Lars Bisgaard.

The three properties were later merged into a single property. At the time of the 1787 census, it was listed as No. 101/102 and home to a total of 47 people distributed among 12 households. Jens Rasmussen Lund, a former distiller and the owner of the property, resided there with his wife Anne Nielsen and one maid. Peder Ohlsen Dahl, a grocer (spækhøker), resided in the building with his wife Kirsten Peders Datter and one maid. Johan Conradt Gobel, a hairdresser, resided in the building with his wife Marie Beckstrøm. Christian Pedersen, an accountant at the Lottery, resided in the building with his wife Catrine Salto and one lodger. Christian Bastian, a master shoemaker, resided in the building with his wife Dorte Knudsen, their three sons (aged seven to 15) and two shoemakers working for him. Heiman Hertz, an employee at the synagogue, resided in the building with his wife Gudel Joels and three daughters from his first marriage (aged 18 to 22). Levin Samson and Hanne Levin, another Jewish couple (no occupation mentioned in the census records), resided in the building with their two children (aged six and seven) and one maid. Bodil Elvig (née Holm), resided in the building with her two children and two maids. Marcus Levin Hartig (1755–1809), a merchant dealing in East Asian goods, resided in the building with his wife Johanne, their three children (aged two to five) and two maids. Bratke Abrahams, a 66-year-old widow, resided in the building with the lodger Pesche Marcus. Kirstine Hansen, another widow, employed with needlework, resided in the building with the lodger Alhed Kiersgaard Møller. Andreas Rumberg, a joiner, resided in the building with his wife Anne Regine Maas and their two-year-old daughter Lovise Auguste Rumberg.

Together with most of the other buildings in the area, Lund's property was destroyed in the Copenhagen Fire of 1795. The present building on the site was constructed for him in 1797–1798.

=== 19th century ===
At the time of the 1801 census, No. 101 was home to 40 people distributed among nine households. It had been acquired by the 28-year-old broker (vekselhandler) Nathan Jacob. He resided in the building with his wife Hanne Meyer and maid Edle Salomon. Isaac Salomon, registered as "poor" in the census records, was also living in the building. Peter Hansteen, a merchant, resided in the building with his wife Marie Elisabeth Larsen, their daughter Christiane Johanne [Hansteen], a maid and a lodger. Jacob August Jordan, a physician associated with Børnehuset, resided in the building with his wife Christiane Sophie Magdal. Mølboe, their four children (aged two to 13), two maids and one lodger. Anne Juul, a 68-year-old widow ropemaker, resided in the building with her 39-year-old daughter Ane Dorothea Møller (née Juul), her son-in-law, Lars Christian Møller, a maid and a lodger for some reason listed as a separate household. Hans Jacob Hagemann, a military officer with rank of major, resided in the building with his wife Marie Sørensen, their six children (aged two to 20), a maid and a lodger. Their eldest son Jørgen Christopher Hagemann (1783–1850) was also an army officer. Abraham Hansen, a workman, resided in the basement with his wife Mette Cathrine Jensdatter, his brother-in-law Simon Schmidt and a maid.

The property was listed as No. 79 in the new cadastre of 1806. It was still owned at that time by Nathan Jacob. The future bishop Jacob Peter Mynster was among the residents of the building from 1811 to 1812. He then moved to a now demolished building on Gammeltorv.

At the time of the 1840 census, No. 79 was home to 36 people. Jokel Simon Jacob, bookkeeper for the Jewish Congregation (Mosaisk Trossamfund), resided on the first floor with three daughters (aged seven to 15), two sons (aged 12 and 13), a housekeeper and a maid. Caspar Johannes von Benzon (1786–1868), a military officer and kornskriver, also resided on the first floor with his wife Wilhelmine Conradine Benzon (née Giese, 1803–1869), their four children (aged three to nine) and two maids. Cathrine Margrethe Winding (née Green), a widow teacher (institutbestyrerinde), resided on the second floor with the lodgers Daniel Buchmann, Ane Marie Buchmann and Hans Nielsen (master tailor). Casper Ernst, a former adjutant at the 1st Battalion of the Jutland Sharpshooter Regiment, resided in one of the ground floor apartments with his wife Louise Ernst and their four children (aged nine to 17). Hans Holm, a cooper, resided in the other ground floor apartment with his wife Lise Birgitte née Kamp, a foster son (aged six) and two lodgers. Elemine Lund, an unmarried 37-year-old needleworker, resided in the basement with her eight-year-old son Christian Frederik Lund and a maid.

The politician Balthazar Christensen was among the residents of the building from 1856 to 1857. His previous home was at Nybrogade 8 and his next home was at Teglgårdsstræde 5.

At the time of the 1860 census, the front wing was home to just 11 people. Abraham Ludvig Salomonsen, Kongelige Landsret and Hof og Stadsret attorney, resided on the ground floor. Baruck Wulff Baruch, a master building painter, resided in the first floor apartment to the right with his wife Arabella née Kalckar, 16-year-old maid Caroline Nielsen and 12-year-old apprentice Carl Ferdinand Dano. Fritz Ferdinand Engelhard, a zinc and slate roofer, resided in the building with his wife Elise Engelhard, their 12-year-old son, a lodger and a maid. Julius Heilbuth, a 26-year-old businessman, resided on the first floor. He would later work as chief operating officer (forretningsfører) for the Holmegaard Glass Factory.

The property was by 1865 owned by grocer (høker) C. A. Kjær. The tenants included master painter I. F. Henckel, royal clerk H. V. Drewsen, former grocer (urtekræmmer) J. R. Møller, merchant B. A. Meyer and managing director C. A. Meyer.

The property was owned by businessman (grosserer) P. C. C. Bunch in 1885.

=== 20th century ===
In 1896, Emanuel Petersen bought the building. His eponymous wholesale company /founded 1870) mostly dealt in coffee, sugar and larger colonial goods. It had until then been located First at Store Regnegade (1870-1884) and then at Kronprinsessegade 6.

Petersen's property was home to 19 residents at the 1906 census. Emanuel Petersen resided on the first floor with his wife Anna Sørine Petersen, four children (aged 18 to 26), one male servant and one maid. Erik Peter Georg Bech (1762–), a high court attorney, resided in one of the second floor apartments. Laura Mathilde Meyer, an 82-year-old woman, resided in the other second floor apartment with a maid and a lodger. The lodger, Halfdan Casse (1877–1912), was a jurist. Ole Peter Nielsen, a courier, resided in one of the third-floor apartments with his wife Emma Elisabeth Nielsen and their two children (aged four and six). Hansine Nikoline Nielsen, a 52-year-old cleaning lady, resided in the other third-floor apartment with her two children (aged 14 and 22).

Haldor Gunnløgson & Jørn Nielsen, an architectural firm best known for designing the Ministry of Foreign Affairs, was based in the building from 1973 until 1985. In 1978, Haldor Gunnløgson (1918–1985) and Jørn Nielsen (1919–1996) refurbished the building.

== Architecture ==
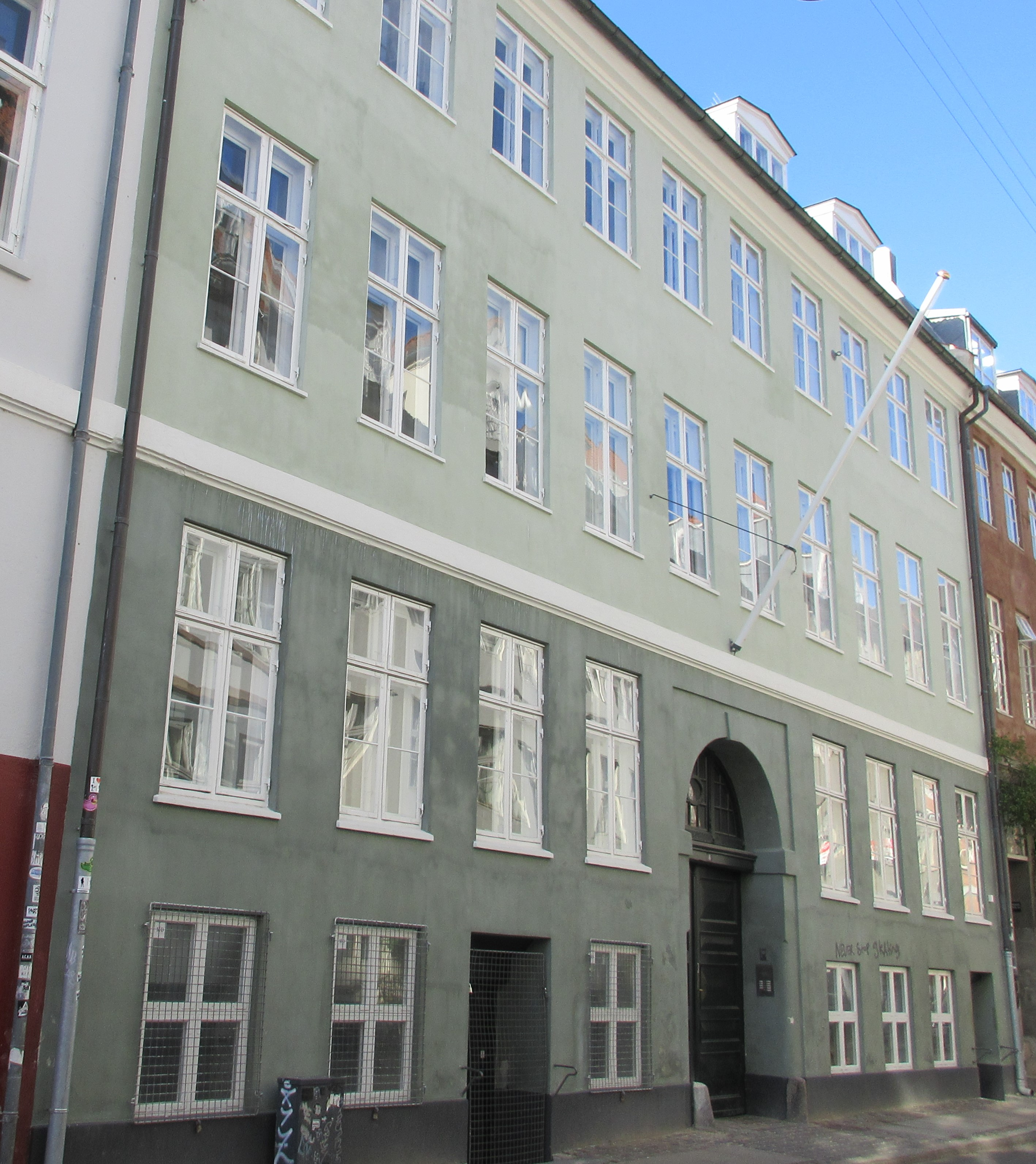
Brolæggerstræde 6

Brolæggerstræde is a three-winged complex, constructed with three storeys over a walk-out basement, surrounding three sides of a central courtyard. The main wing on Brolæggerstræde is ten bays long and has a two-bay gateway in the two central bays. The plastered facade is finished with a belt course above the ground floor and a cornice below the roof.

== Today ==
As of 2008, the property was owned by the Danish Union of Teachers (Danmarks Lærerforening, DlF). The building is let out as office space. The tenants include the Greenlandic-Danish fashion designer Bibi Chemnitz (Brolæggerstræde 6A) and Danish techstar company ZRM
