= Kronprinsessegade 6 =

Building in Copenhagen, Denmark

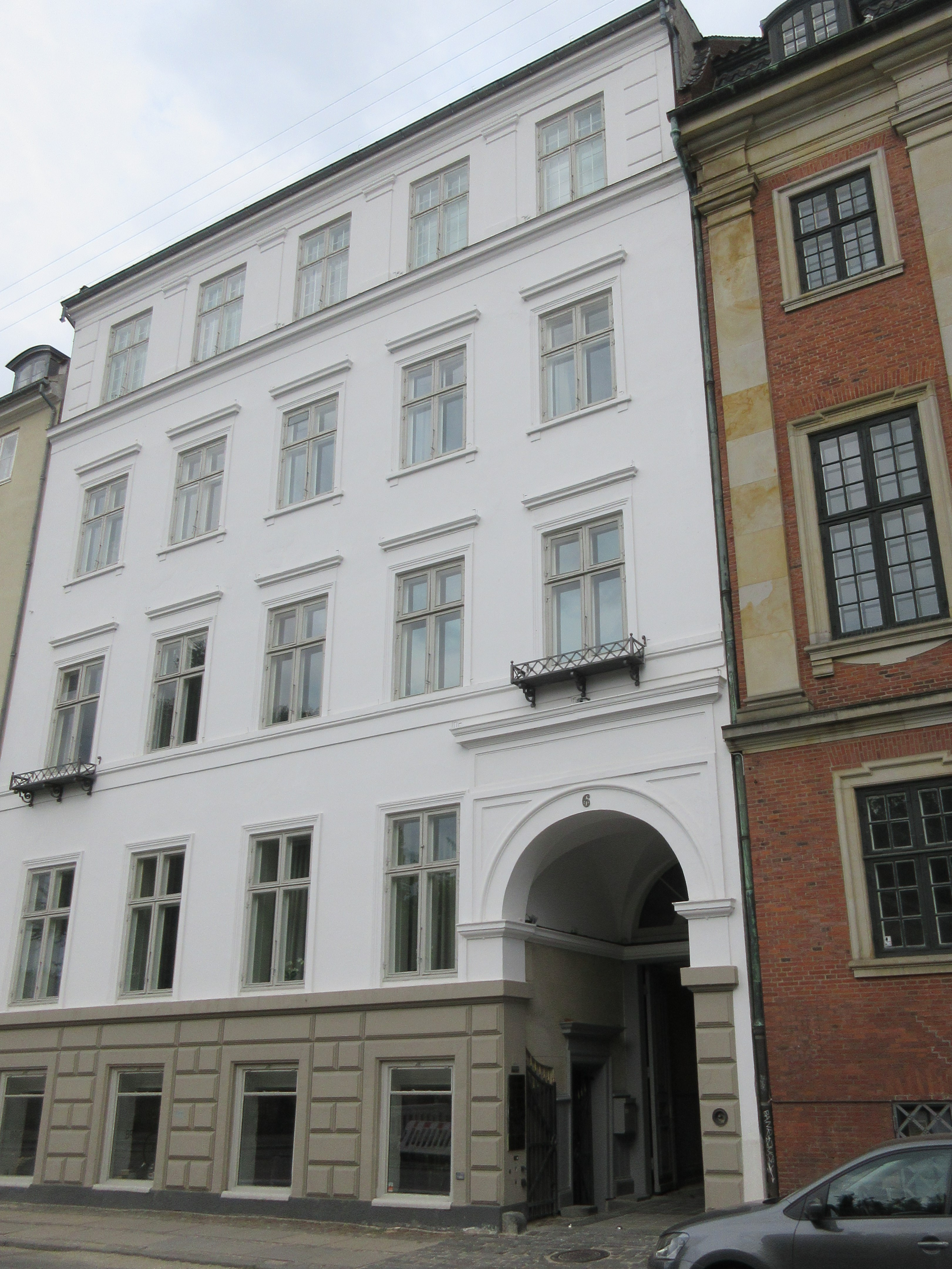
- Interactive map of the Kronprinsessegade 6 area

General information
- Location: Copenhagen, Denmark
- Coordinates: 55°40′58.89″N 12°34′52.37″E
- Completed: 1804

Design and construction
- Architect: Johan Martin Quist

Kronprinsessegade 6 is a Neoclassical property overlooking Rosenborg Castle Garden in central Copenhagen, Denmark. It was listed on the Danish registry of protected buildings and places in 1945.

== History ==
=== Early history ===
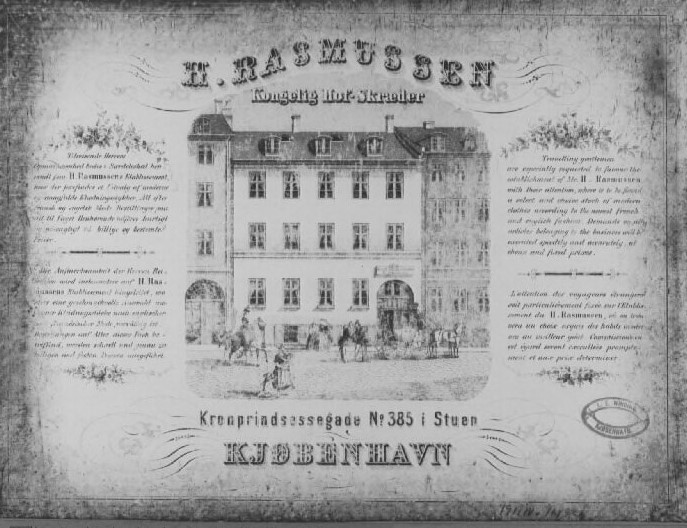
Advert for court tailor H. Rasmussen.

The site was initially listed as Lot 4A when Kronprinsessegade was created in c. 1800. The present building on the site was constructed in 1803–1804 by master builder Johan Martin Quist.

The property was listed in the new cadastre of 1806 as No. 385 in St. Ann's West Quarter. It was still owned by Qvist at that time. C. Olufsen (1764–1827), a professor of agriculture, lived in the building in 1811–12.

Court tailor H. Rasmussen operated a tailor's workshop on the ground floor of the building.

=== 1840 census ===
The property was home to four households at the 1840 census. Polycarpus Andreas Heinrich Feddersen, a customs official with title of justitsråd, resided on the ground floor with his wife Ane Margrethe Caspersen, their four children (aged 16 to 26), a husjomfru, a male servant and a maid. Jens Bertelsen, a senior clerk in Rentekammeret, resided on the first floor with his wife Henriette Christiane Bertelsen /née Mulvad), their nine children (aged two to 14), one male servant and three maids. Joachim Kretchmer Malling, a colonel and auditor in Nationalbanken, resided on the first floor with his wife Mathilde Kitzon, their four children (aged 12 to 21), a governess, one male servant and three maids. Henrik Nicolai Clausen, a professor of theology, resided in the second-floor apartment with his wife Birgite Fransisca (née Svane), their four children (aged one to 15), one male servant and two maids. Jens Andersen, a master shoemaker, resided in the basement with his wife Engel Chathrine Andersenm their two children (aged one and five) and one maid.

=== 1840s and 1850s ===
The theologian N N. Clausen (1793–1877) resided in the building in 1840–41.

The property was home to four households at the time of the 1845 census. Hans Christian Magnus Gottschalck resided on the first floor with his wife Christiane Louise Gottschalch, their three children (aged seven to 13) and one maid. The physician Carl Peter Mathias Hansen and his wife Jacobine Sophie Birgitta Bondesen resided on the second floor with their five children (aged one to 10), a maid, a nanny and two lodgers (students). The eldest son was the later high-ranking civil servant Christian Eskild Theodor Hansen. Louise von Leth, a governess, resided on the first floor with Ove, Peter and Hacobine Malling (aged 14 to 24) and one maid. Peter Olsen, a shoemaker, resided in the basement.

The physician Knud Faber (1862–1956) resided on the ground floor from 1846 until his death ten years later

=== 1860–1880s ===
In 1884, Emmanuel Petersen moved his wholesale business (founded 1870) to the building. It had until then been located at Store Regnegade 15. It mostly dealt in coffee, sugar and larger colonial goods. In 1896, it relocated to new premises at Brolæggerstræde 6.

=== Erichsen family ===
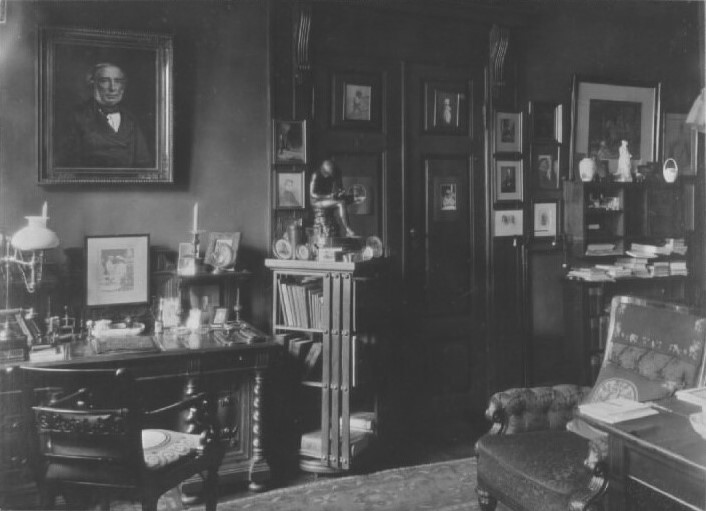
Fenger's reception room at Kronprinsessegade 6.

The property was acquired at some point by businessman (grosserer) Knud Erichsen (1860-). On 17 April 1888, he had founded a wholesale business dealing in sugar, molasses and sugar beet seeds.The property was later passed to his son Kai Erichsen (1891-). The firm was still based in the building in 1950.

The physician Immanuel Fenger (-1927) and his wife Thyra Nathalia Augusta Bock (1853–1906) resided in the second-floor apartment from 1904. Fenger had spent his childhood at Kronprinsessegade 35 as the son of physician Carl Emil Fenger (1814–84) and Ida Louise Plockross (1827–82). Thyra Fenger (née Bok) was the daughter of physician Johan Christian August Bock (1813–79), gift med Petrine Vilhelmine Petersen (Prinsessegade 1). They lived in the nine-room apartment with their five children. One of the children was the later surgeon Mogens Fenger. Their other son, V. A. Fenger, a physician, has described the home in Et Lægehjem (Danske hjem ved århundredeskiftet, H. Hirschsrpunrgs Forlag).

Anina Wilhelmine Sophie Augusta Nielsen, a junk dealer, resided on the ground floor at the 1906 census. She lived there with her 27-year-old daughter Olga Alma Augusta Nielsen and 15-year-old son Paul Georg Nielsen.

In the 1920s, Kronprinsessegade 6 housed the embassy of the Soviet Union.

== Architecture ==
Quist's original building consisted of three storeys over a high cellar. The fourth storey was not added until 1896. The gate opens to a small courtyard. A three-storey side wing extends from the rear side of the building along the northside of the courtyard to a three-storey cross wing with gateway that opens to another courtyard. The building was listed on the Danish registry of protected buildings and places in 1945.

== Today ==
Today a part of the building is used as offices for the film company Citizen Dane, that have furnished and decorated the rooms in a consistent old style.. Citizen Dane is a market leader in Denmark within corporate movies.
