= Nybrogade 8 =

Building in Copenhagen

Nybrogae 8
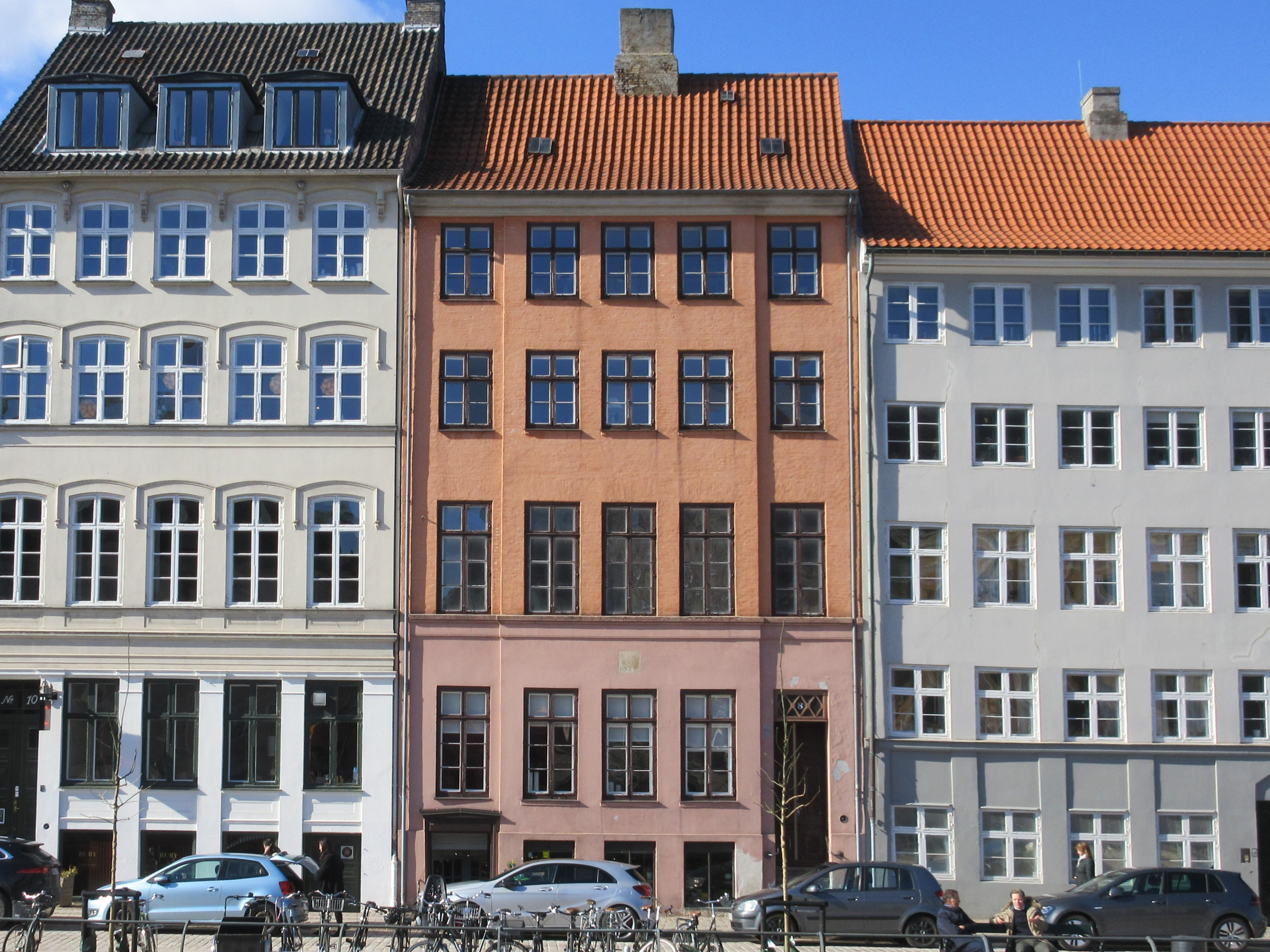
- Interactive map of the Nybrogae 8 area

General information
- Architectural style: Neoclassical
- Location: Copenhagen, Denmark
- Coordinates: 55°40′41.52″N 12°34′30.9″E
- Completed: 18th century

Nybrogade 8 is an 18th-century building overlooking Slotsholmens Kanal and Slotsholmen in central Copenhagen, Denmark. The property comprises the three-story, half-timbered building at Snaregade 5 on the other side of the block as well as the narrow cobbled courtyard that separates the two buildings. The property was listed in the Danish registry of protected buildings and places in 1945.

== Architecture ==
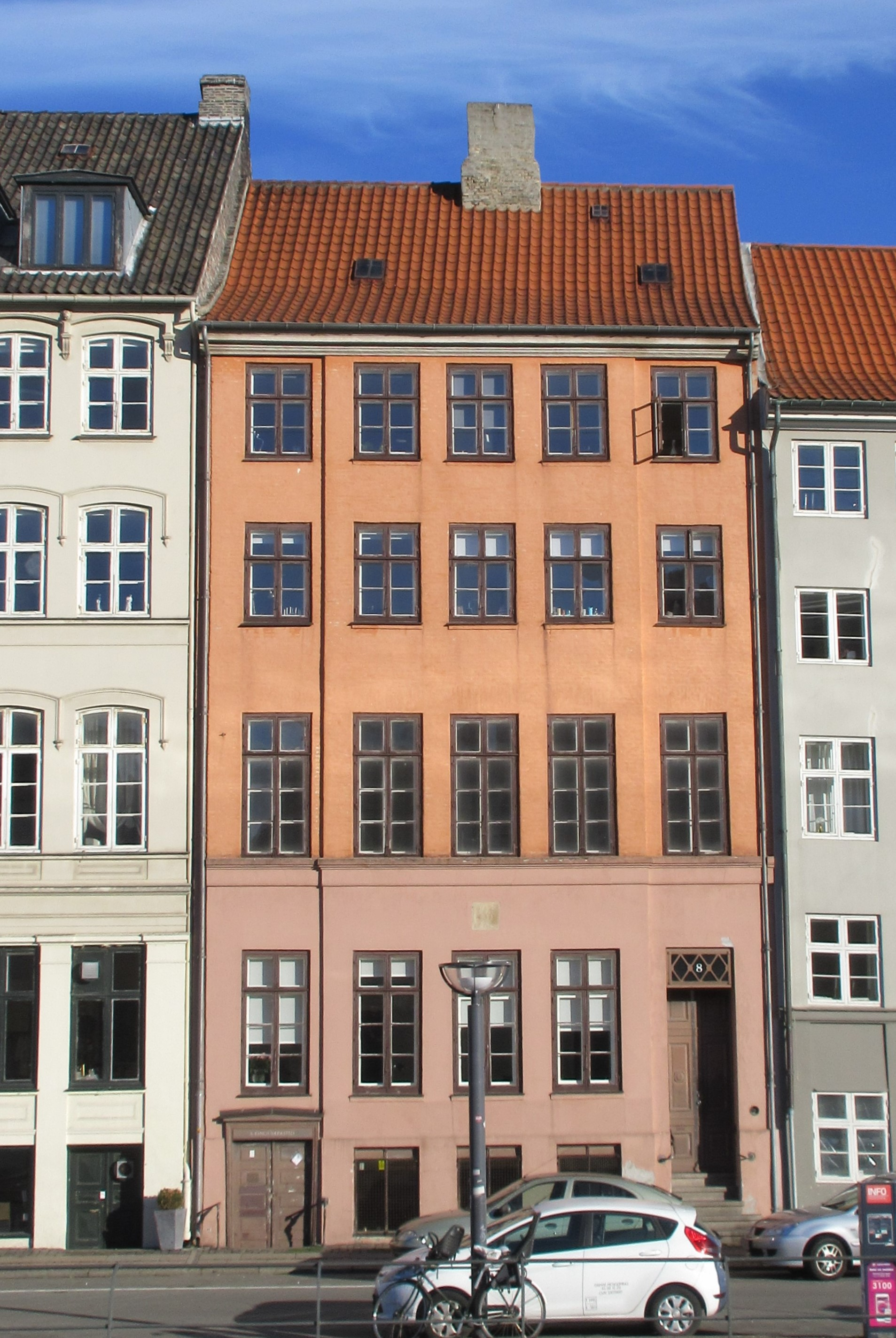
Nybrogade 8

Nybrogade is constructed with four storeys over a walk-out basement with a four-bay perpendicular side wing extending from the northern part of its rear side. The building is five bays wide of which the three central ones form a slightly projecting avant-corps. The front is constructed in brick, rendered in a color reminiscent of Nexø on the ground floor and a pale red color on the upper floors, with brown-painted windows. The main entrance furthest to the right (south) is accessed via a short flight of granite steps and topped by a hood mould. The door is a brown-painted wooden door with transom window. In the other side of the building is a cellar entrance with cast iron railings shaped as griffons. The windows on the two upper floors are taller than the ones on the upper ones.

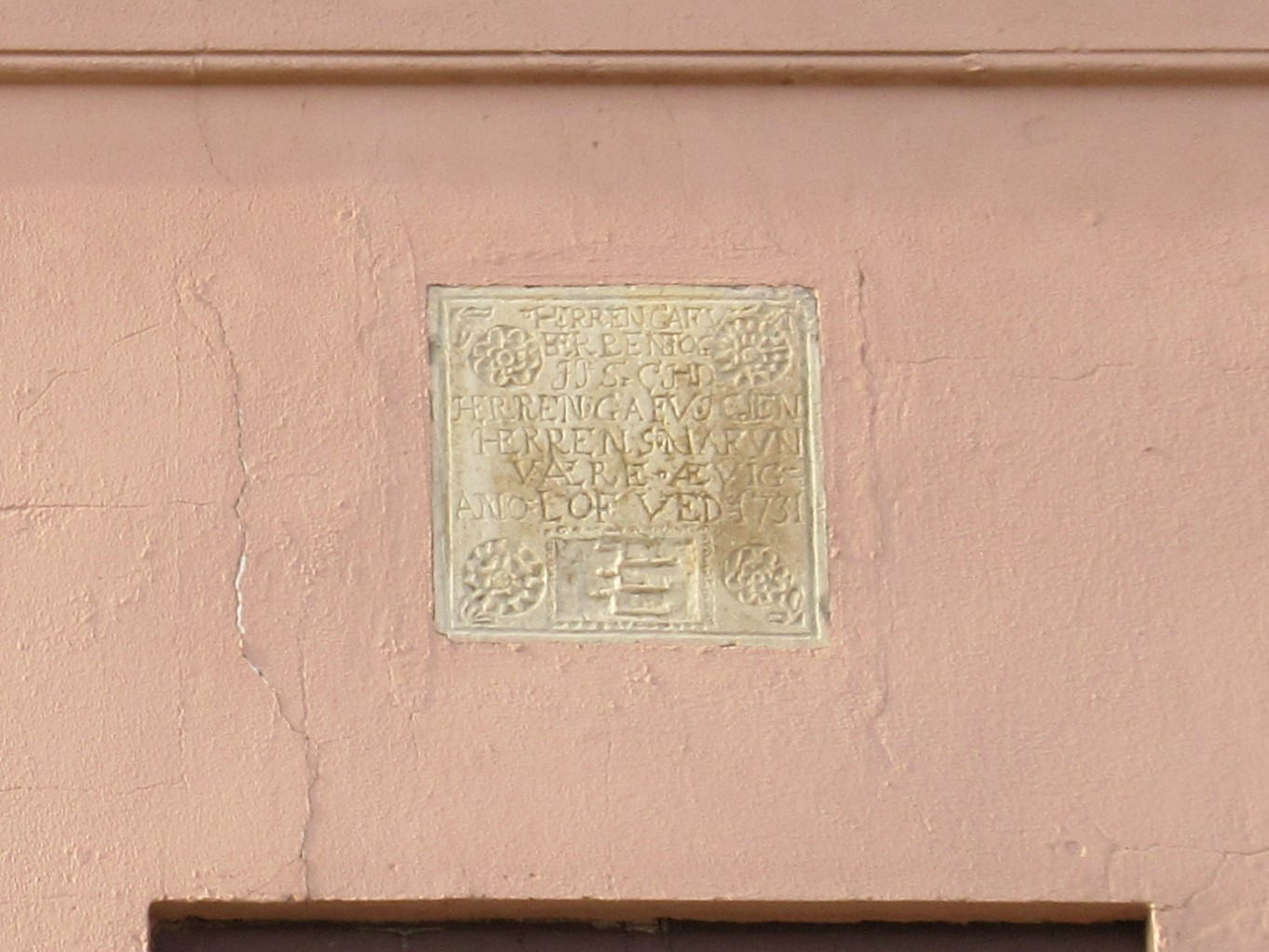
The stone tablet

A stone tablet with an inscription is embedded in the wall above the central window on the ground floor, the year 1732 indicating that it dates from the previous building on the spot. The facade is finished by a white-painted cornice. The red tile roof is pierced by a substantial brick chimney. The four-bay side wing is topped by a mono-pitched red tile roof pierced by another chimney.

The rear side of the building is constructed with timber framing, brown-painted with yellow infills, standing on a black-painted granite plinth. The third floor is slightly inset, has a different rhythm in the timber framing and different windows, heralding that the building was expanded in 1843.

=== Snaregade 5 ===
Snaregade 5 is a timber-framed structure, with black-painted beams and infills of undressed brick, standing on a plinth of black painted granite ashlars. It consists of three stories over a raised cellar towards the street and with two two-story side wings on its rear. The front side is seven bays wide, of which the central bay with the main entrance is wider than the other bays. The facade is finished by a white-painted cornice. The ridged roof is clad with red tile.

The rear side of the building, with brown-painted beams and yellow infills, features a five-bay gabled wall dormer which continues into the roof of the southern side wing. It has a door with transom window in the centr and a cellar entrance furthest to the north.

The northern side wing is four bays long and topped by a mono-pitched, red tile roof. The timber framing is again painted brown but the infills are painted red. It features two cellar entrances. The southern side wing is just two bays long and again topped by a mono-pitched red tile roof. The timber framing is brown-painted and the infills are yellow.
