= Rural Address Property Identification =

System for emergency finding of rural properties in New Zealand

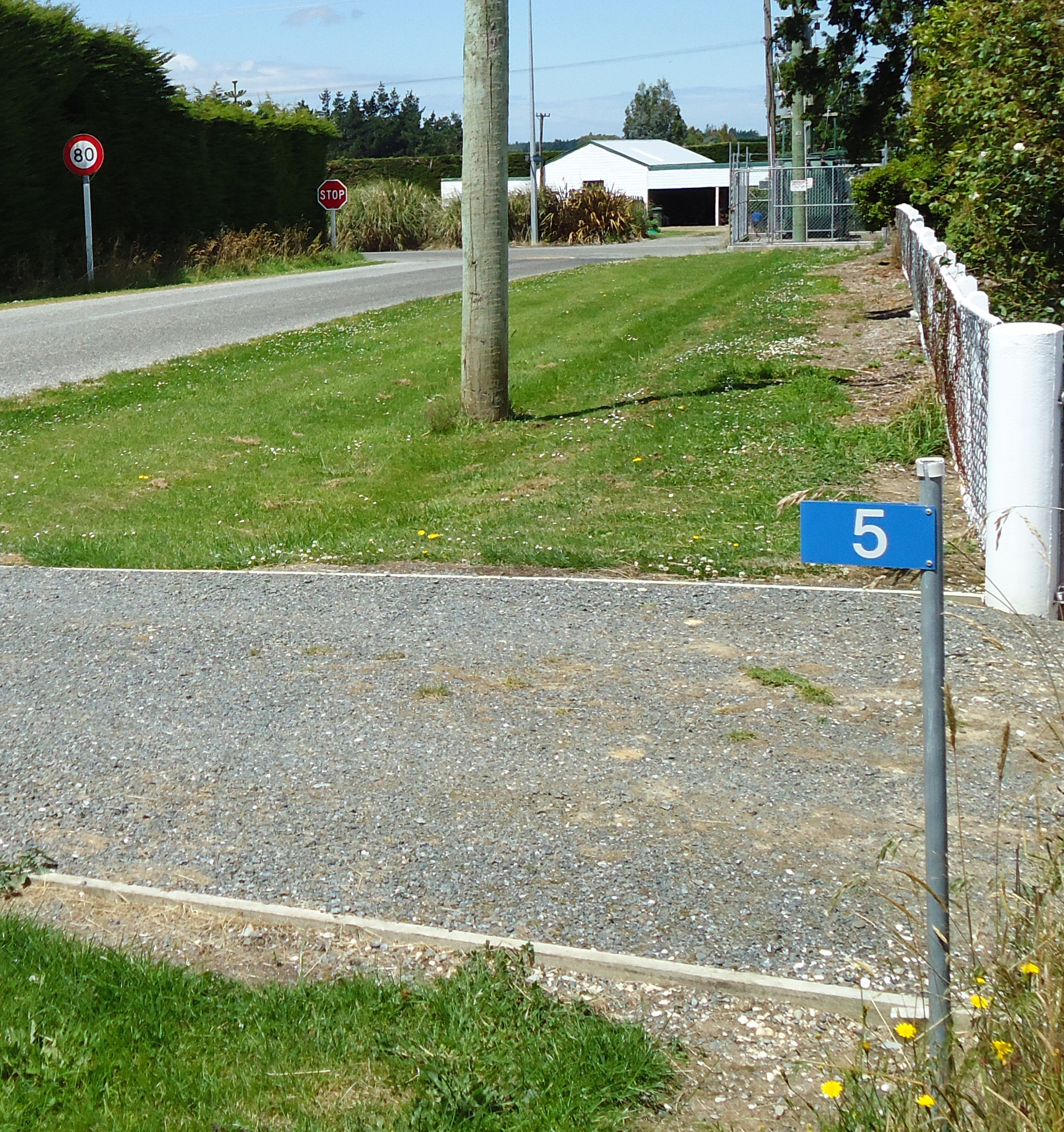
A RAPID number sign in New Zealand. The number 5 means that the property is between 40m and 60m from the datum point of the road, and is on the left hand side of the road as viewed from the datum point.

Rural Address Property IDentification (RAPID) is a scheme instituted in New Zealand to assist emergency services in identifying and locating rural properties.

== Overview ==
It was first introduced in 1999 and is now covered by AS/NZS 4819:2011. However, since the adoption of Australian/New Zealand Standard 4819:2003 Geographic Information – Rural and urban addressing in 2003, this scheme is now known as Rural Addressing.

An example address of 1536 Longley Road can easily be found by dividing by 100. This tells anyone looking for the property, that it is 15.36 km from the start of Longley Road. An emergency crew can set the vehicle trip meter at the beginning of the road and know they do not need to waste time checking for letterbox numbers until the trip meter gets close to the rapid number they are looking for.

Any rural property can have a rapid number, and some have multiple numbers for different entrance ways off the road. This helps when a visitor needs to access stockyards or other parts of a rural property.
