= Bibi Chemnitz =

Greenlandic fashion designer

Bibi Chemnitz (born 1983) is a Greenlandic fashion designer who is based in Copenhagen, Denmark. Raised in Greenland by her Inuit parents, she moved to Denmark when she was 13 and studied fashion design in Herning. In 2006, she and her partner established the Bibi Chemnitz fashion business in Aarhus, moving to Copenhagen in 2012. Inspired by her Greenlandic heritage, her designs for both men and women have featured in international fashion shows and are marketed worldwide.

== Early life ==
Born in Nuuk on 30 December 1983, Bibi Chemnitz is the daughter of two Native Greenlanders. As a child, she lived with her family in Narsaq, Maniitsoq and Nuuk. When she was 13 she moved to Denmark where she studied fashion design at VIA University College in Herning.

== Career ==
In 2006, together with her partner David Røgilds, a Danish graphic artist and designer, she established the fashion business Bibi Chemnitz in Aarhus, moving to Copenhagen in 2012. The firm markets fashions for both men and women through retailers around the world, including Galeries Lafayette, Beijing, the Koon department store in Seoul, and Podium Market in Moscow. Over the years, designs have been exhibited at fashion weeks throughout Europe and beyond. Inspired by her Native heritage, Chemnitz combines Danish trends with Greenlandic patterns in her hats and prints, benefiting from Nordic minimalism. She also designs fashions which are suited to customers in countries such as India and China. These include Chemnitz' innovative shapes and carefully tailored leisurewear. As a result, she has become something of a star in Greenland although she prefers to avoid the limelight.

In 2023, Chemnitz has exhibited in Paris and, hoping to develop marketing to Asia, in China and Japan.

Chemnitz was a key participant at the 2023 Nuuk Nordic Cultural Festival, designing a variety of hats, tee-shirts, scarves and bags for the festival.
