= Christian Frederik Raben =

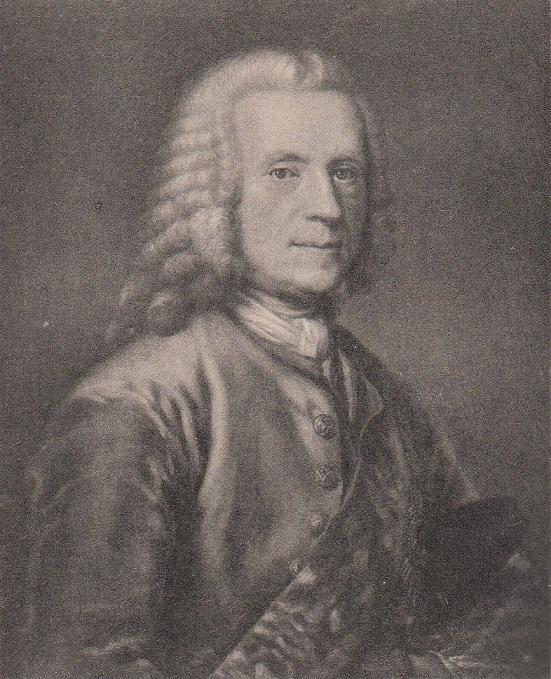
Christian Frederik Raben

Christian Frederik Raben (10 September 1693 – 26 February 1773) was a Danish government official. He served as diocesan governor of Lolland-Falster from 1737 to 1763. He owned the estates Kjærstrip and Bremersvold.

== Early life and education ==
Raben was born on 10 September 1693 in Copenhagen to Johan Otto Raben (1646-1719) and Emerentia von Levetzow (1669-1746). Raben's father was appointed as lord chamberlain (Hofmarskal) by Christian VI less than a month after Raben was born. He went sent on a Grand Tour abroad as part of his education.

== Career ==
In 1711, Raben was appointed court page (kammerjunker) for the crown prince. In 1724, he was appointed as hofmester for the crown princess. In 1727, he was awarded the title of chamberlain (kammerherre).

In 1731-37, he was appointed hofmester for queen Sophie Magdalene. He concurrently served as county governor of Hørsholm County, which had been granted to the queen in 1730 as her personal property.

In 1737, he was appointed diocesan governor of Lolland-Falster and county governor of Aalholm, Halsted kloster and Maribo counties. He held these posts until 1763. In 1738-69, he concurrently served as provisor of Vallø Kloster. From 1738, he was also associated the Supreme Court. In 1747, he was awarded the title of geheimeråd.

From 1754, he was president of Collegium medicum. In 1744, he was created an honorary member of the Royal Danish Academy of Science.

== Property ==
In 1731, his mother presented him with the estate Kjærstrup. A new half-timbered main building was constructed on the estate in 1746. In 7843, his mother also presented him with Bremersvold and Løve Manor. After his father's death, he took on the management of the Royal Pawn in Copenhagen.

== Personal life ==
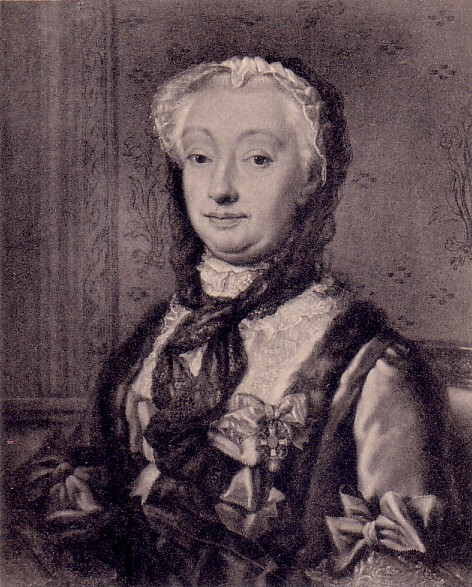
Berte Scheel von Plessen.

Raben was married to Birthe von Plessen (1707-1786) on 1 December 1722. She was a daughter of gehejmeråd Christian Ludvig von Plessen (1676-1752) and Charlotte Amalie Skeel (1685-1729). She was a daughter of Mogens Skeel.

Raben died on 26 February 1773 and is buried at Nysted Church.

== Awards ==
Raben was created a White Knight in 1728, and a Blue Knight in 1748. In 1732, he was awarded the Ordre de l'union parfaite.

Civic offices
Preceded by None	County Governor of Hørsholm County; 1730–1737	Succeeded by Victor Christian von Plessen
Preceded by Peter Neve	Diocesan governor of Lolland-Falster; 1737—1763	Succeeded by Godske Hans von Krogh
