= Gloslunde Church =

Coordinates: 54°45′19″N 11°13′23″E

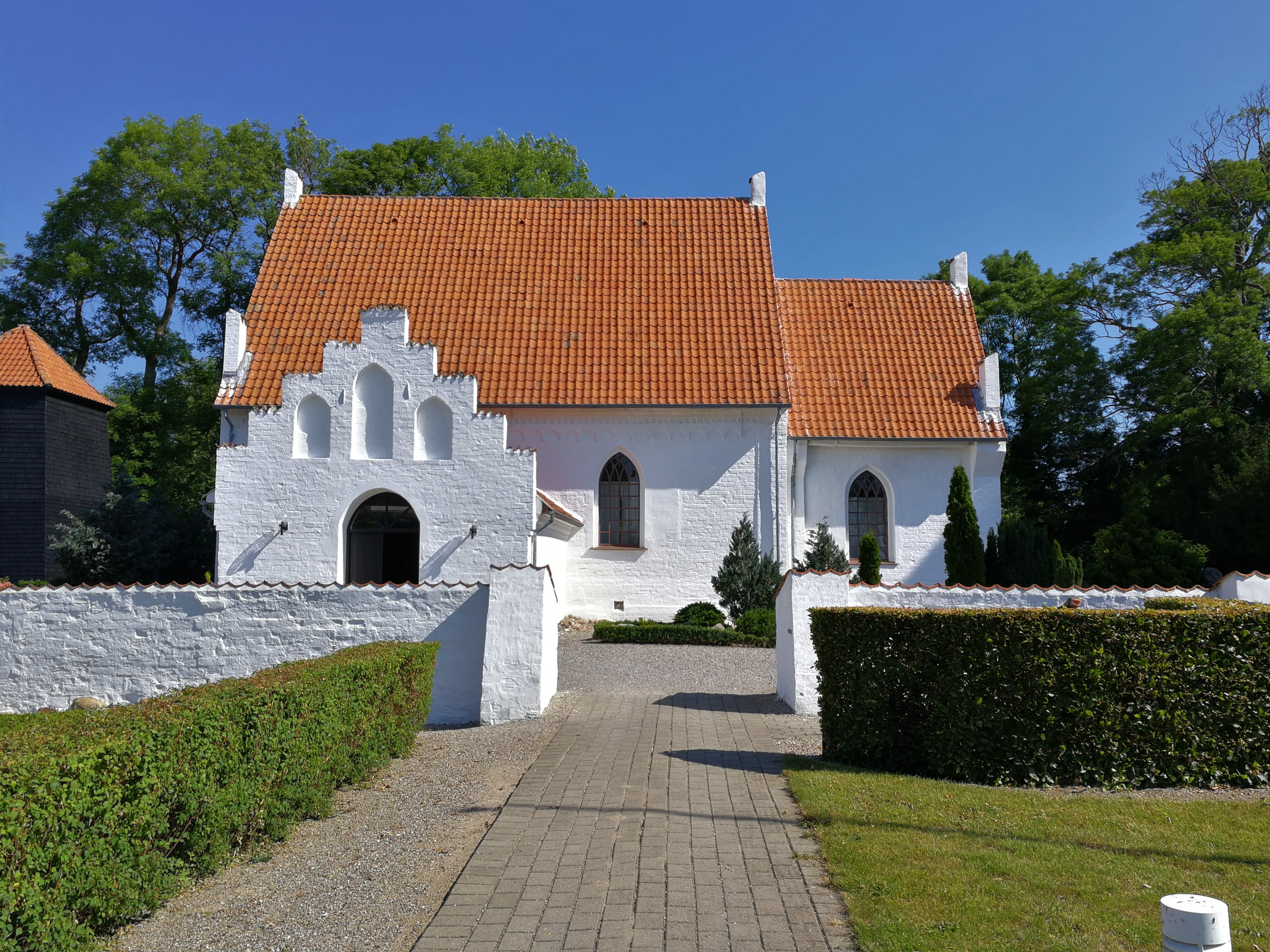
Gloslunde Church in 2020

Gloslunde Church is a Romanesque church east of Dannemare, some 13 km (8.1 mi) southeast of Nakskov on the Danish island of Lolland. Now whitewashed, it was built of red brick in the 13th century. The heritage listed Gloslunde Rectory is located next to the church.

== Architecture ==
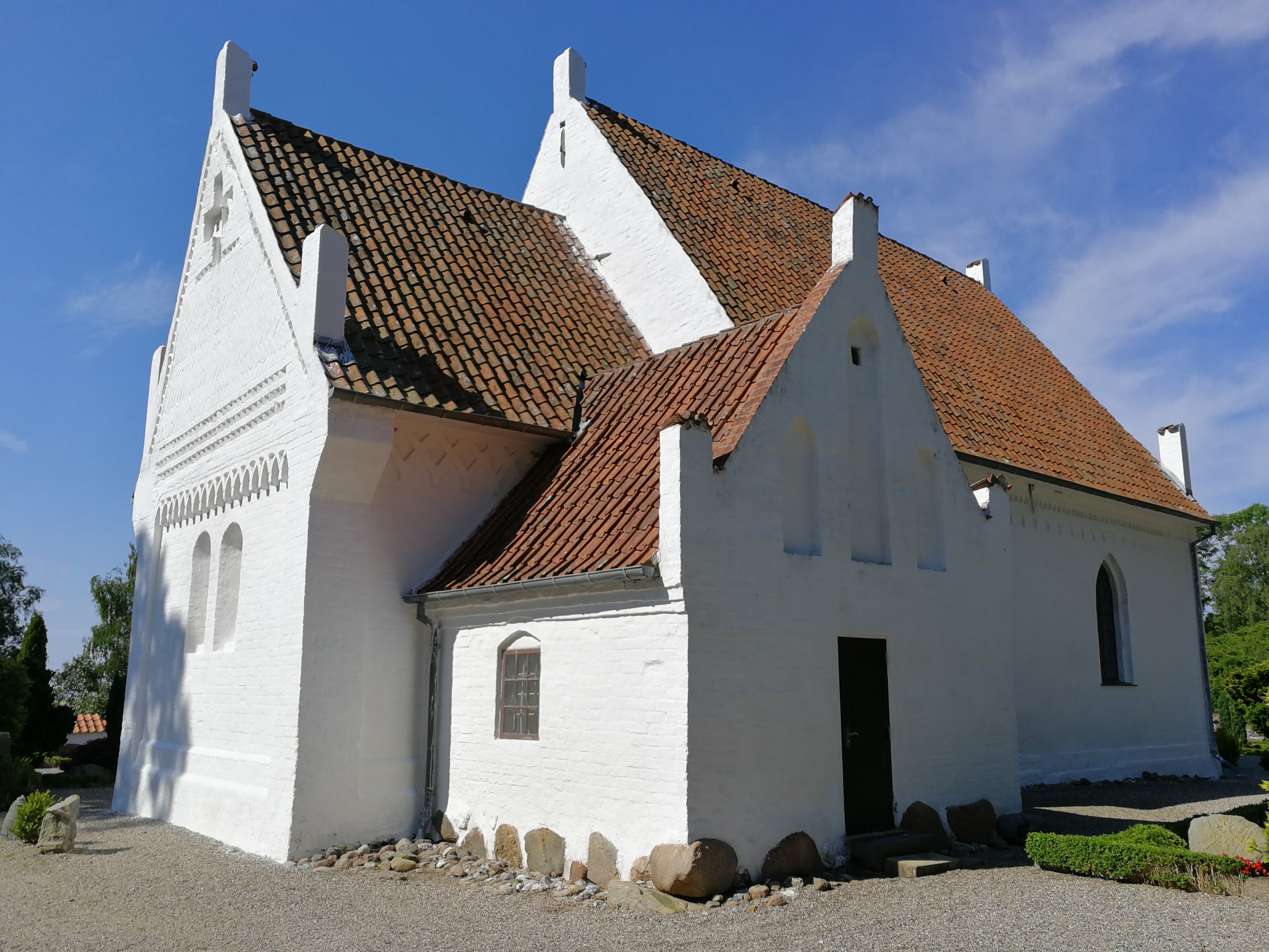
Gloslunde Church

Built of red brick but now whitewashed, the church consists of a Romanesque chancel and nave and a Gothic porch and sacristy. A 14th-century timber bell tower stands close to the church's northwest corner. There are two small Romanesque windows on the chancel gable, now both bricked up. The east gable is also decorated with a round-arch frieze. The original flat wooden ceiling was replaced in the Gothic period with a star-shaped vault in the chancel and two cross-vaults in the nave.

== Interior ==
In a Neo-Gothic frame, the altarpiece contains a painting of Christ in the Garden of Gethsemane by Frederik Christian Lund in 1872. An earlier catechism altarpiece from 1581 in the Renaissance style can be seen in the porch with text from Martin Luther's catechism in its six panels. The pulpit (c. 1590), also in the Renaissance style, presents the paintings of the four Evangelists set in rural scenes with hills and hedges.

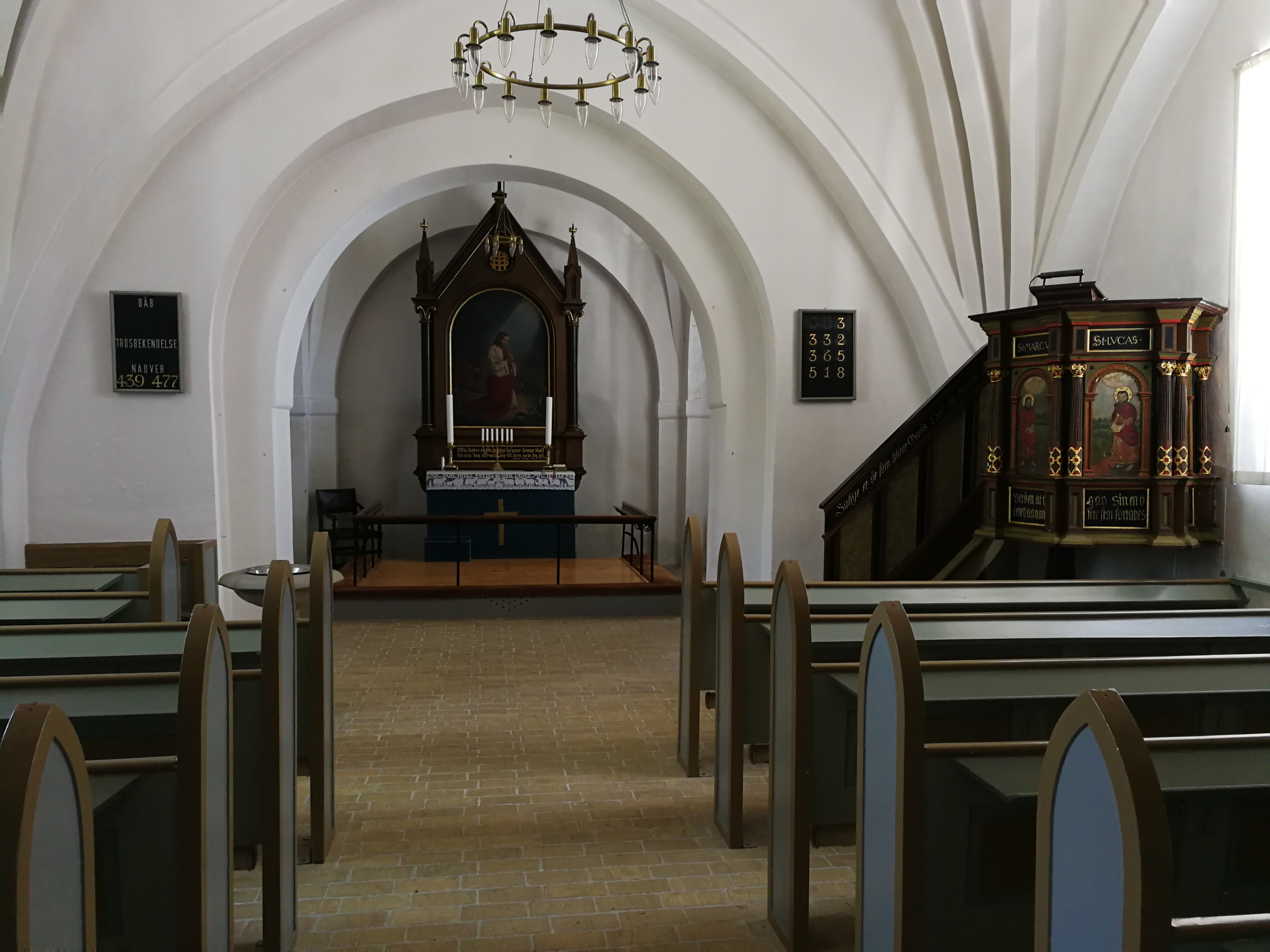
Interior

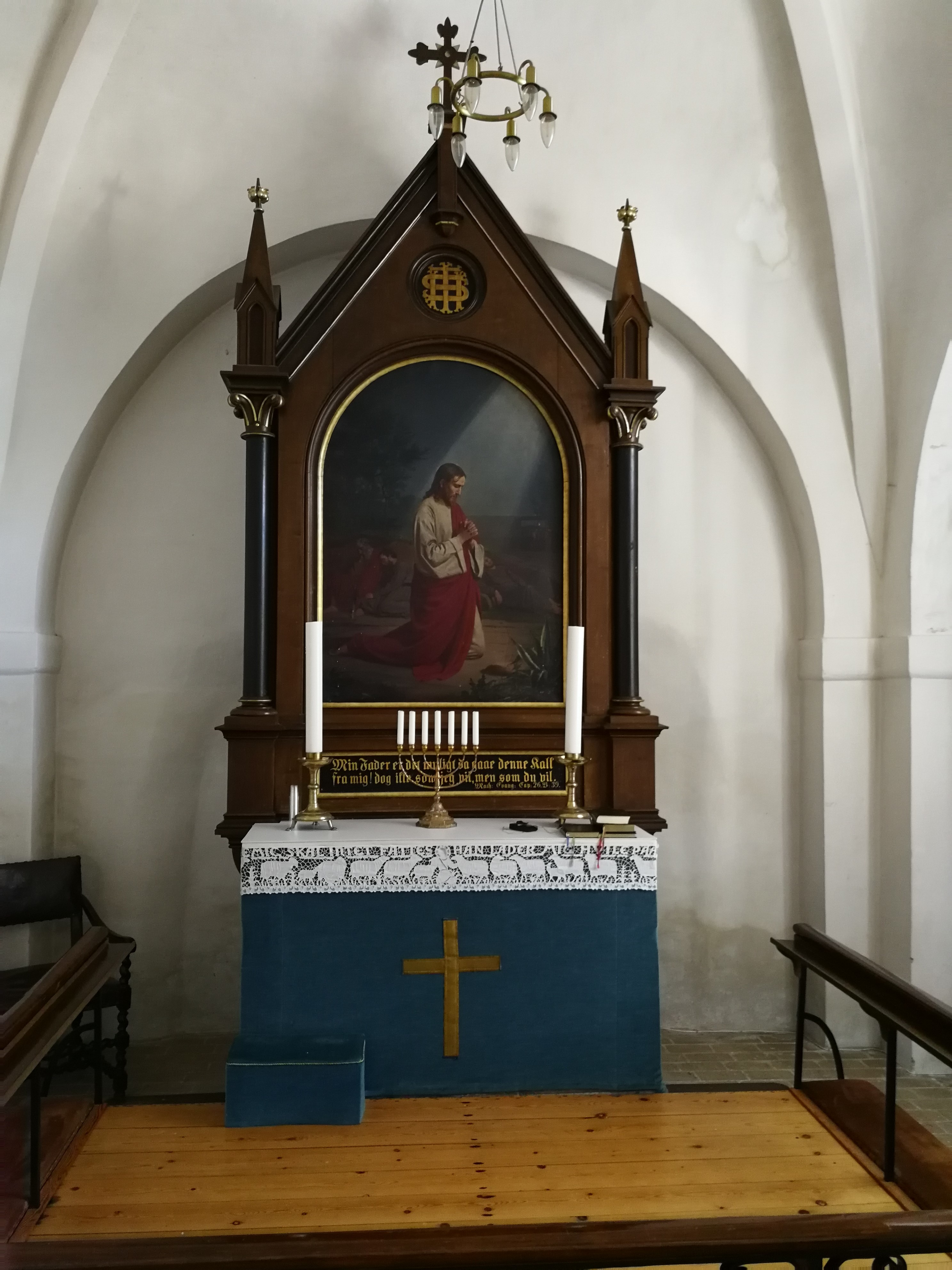
Altarpiece

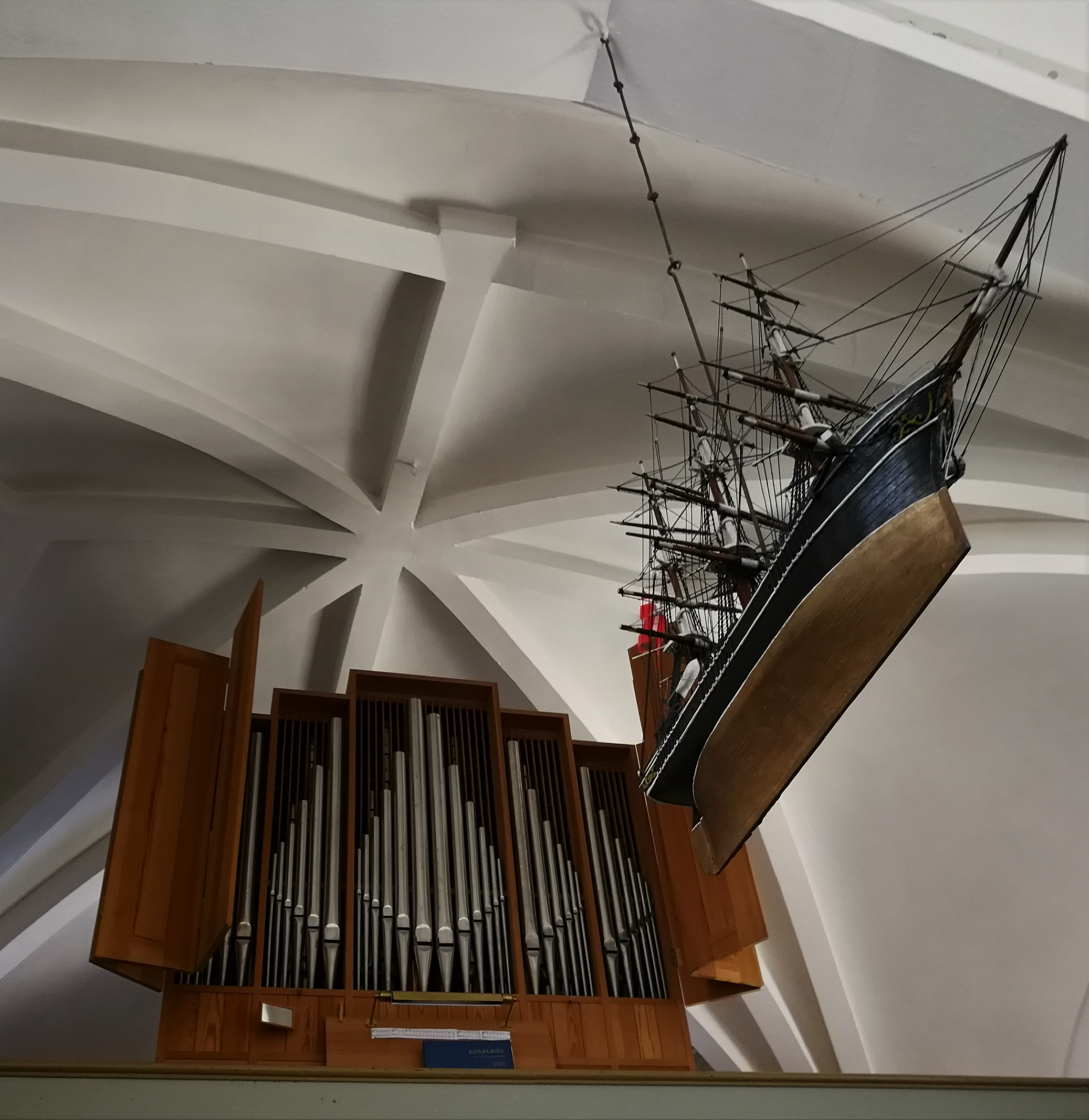
Organ and votive ship

== See also ==
- List of churches on Lolland
