= Kjærstrup =

Danish manor house/estate

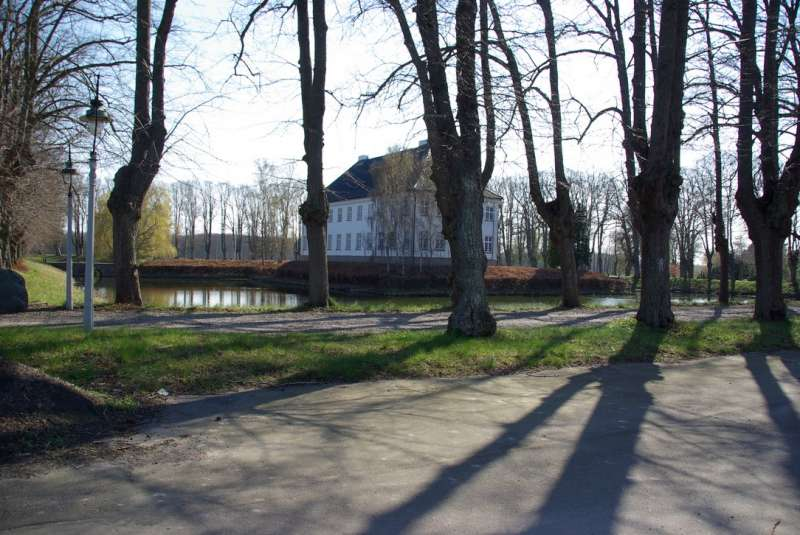
- A glimpse of the rear side of the main building.
- Interactive map of the Kjærstrup area

General information
- Architectural style: Renaissance Revival
- Location: Kærstrupvej 17, 4960 Holeby, Denmark
- Coordinates: 54°41′30″N 11°31′35″E
- Completed: 1765

Kjærstrup, or Kærstrup, is a manor house and estate located 9 kilometres East of Rødbyon Lolland, Lolland Municipality, in Southeastern Denmark. The two-storey, half-timbered main building was faced with brick in 1836 and a central tower in the front was added in 1868. The building was listed on the Danish registry of protected buildings and places in 1918. The adjacent farm buildings date from the early 1910s and are not part of the heritage listing. A Baroque style garden from around 1765 was restored in around 1900. The estate covers 487 hectares of land.

== History ==
=== Early history ===
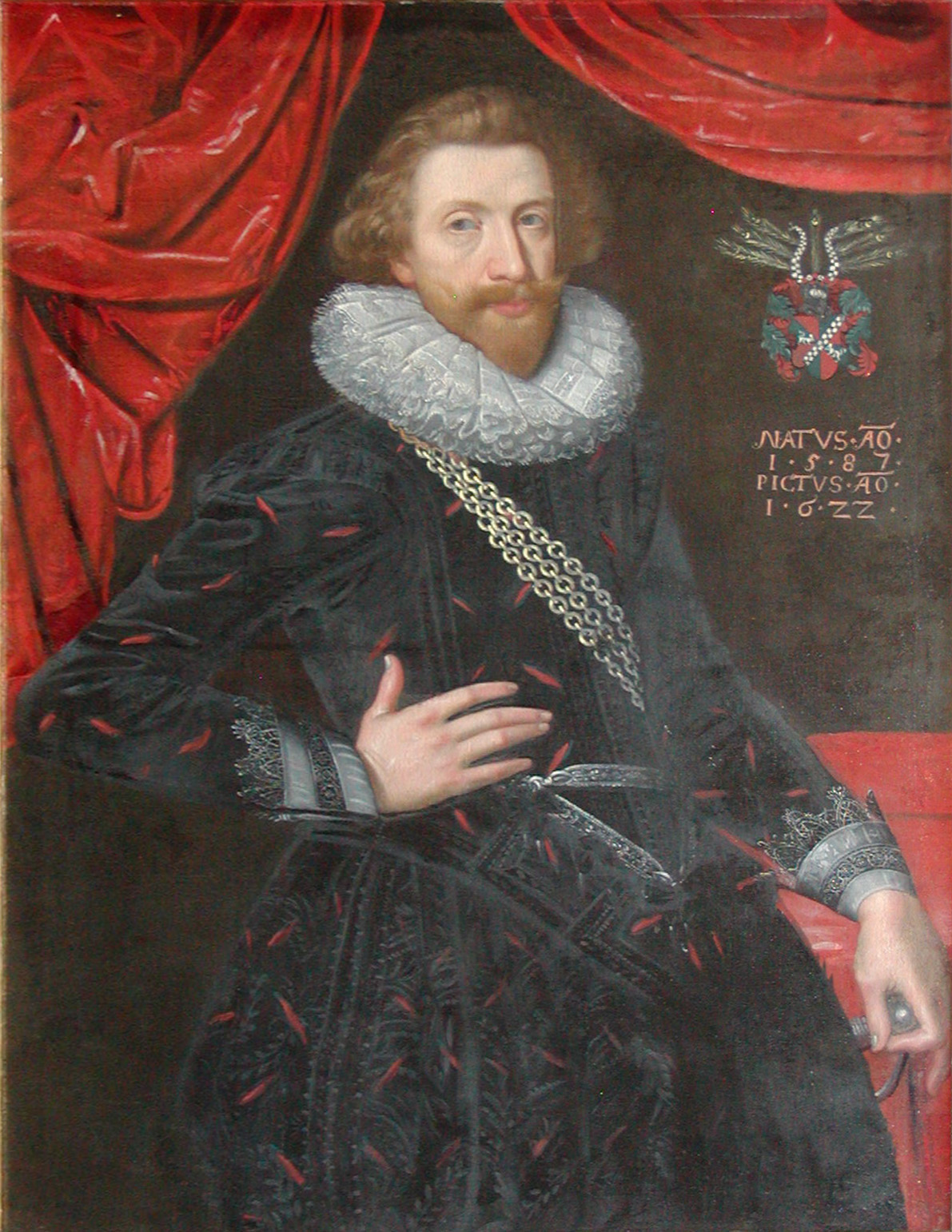
Palle Rosenkrantz

Kjærstrup is one of the oldest manors on Lolland and was originally located in a village by the same name which disappeared in the beginning of the Middle Ages. The first known owner was Anders Siundesen Mule in 1368. It was later owned by the Gøye family for many generations. The last member of the family to own the estate was Henning Gøye. He had studied eight years abroad, among others in Wittenberg. He married Anne Skram, a daughter of Peder Skram, but they had no children. On Gøye's death in 1617, Kjærstrup therefore passed to his sister-in-law, Karen Skram, the widow of Laurids Brockenhuus of Bramstrup and Egeskov. The next owners included Palle Rosenkrantz and Christen Skeel.

In 1720, Kjærstrup was acquired by Frederick IV (1671-1730) and included in Lolland Cavalry District.

=== Raben family ===
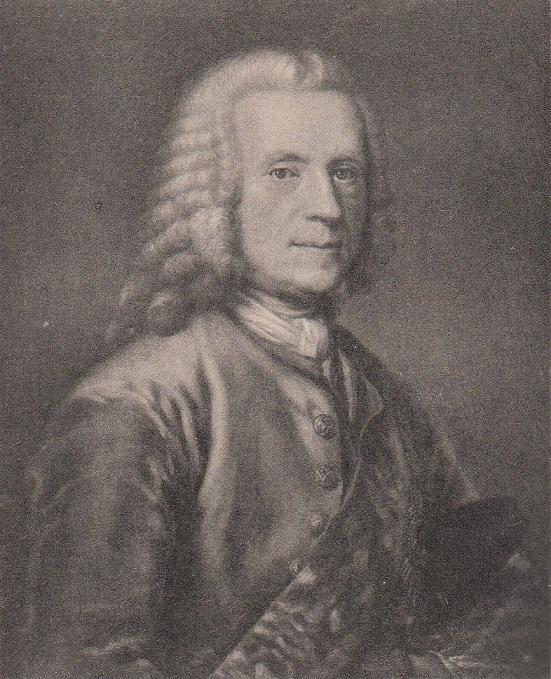
Christian Frederik Raben

In 1725, the cavalry district was dissolved and the land divided into estates and sold in public auction. Kjærstrup, Aalholm and Bremersvold were acquired by Emerentia Raben, née von Levetzau, the widow of Johan Otto Raben, She immediately ceded Kjærstrup and Bremersvold to her son-in-law Niels Rosenkrantz Schack but under the reservation that the estates would revert to the Raben family if his marriage with Sophie Hedewig Raben remained without children. Emerentia von Levetzau bought both estates back in 1732 after Niels Rosenkrantz Schack had died without children the previous year. On her death in 1746, Kjærstrup and Bremersvold passed to her son, Christian Frederik Raben. He constructed a new main building on the foundations of the Gøye family's buildings.

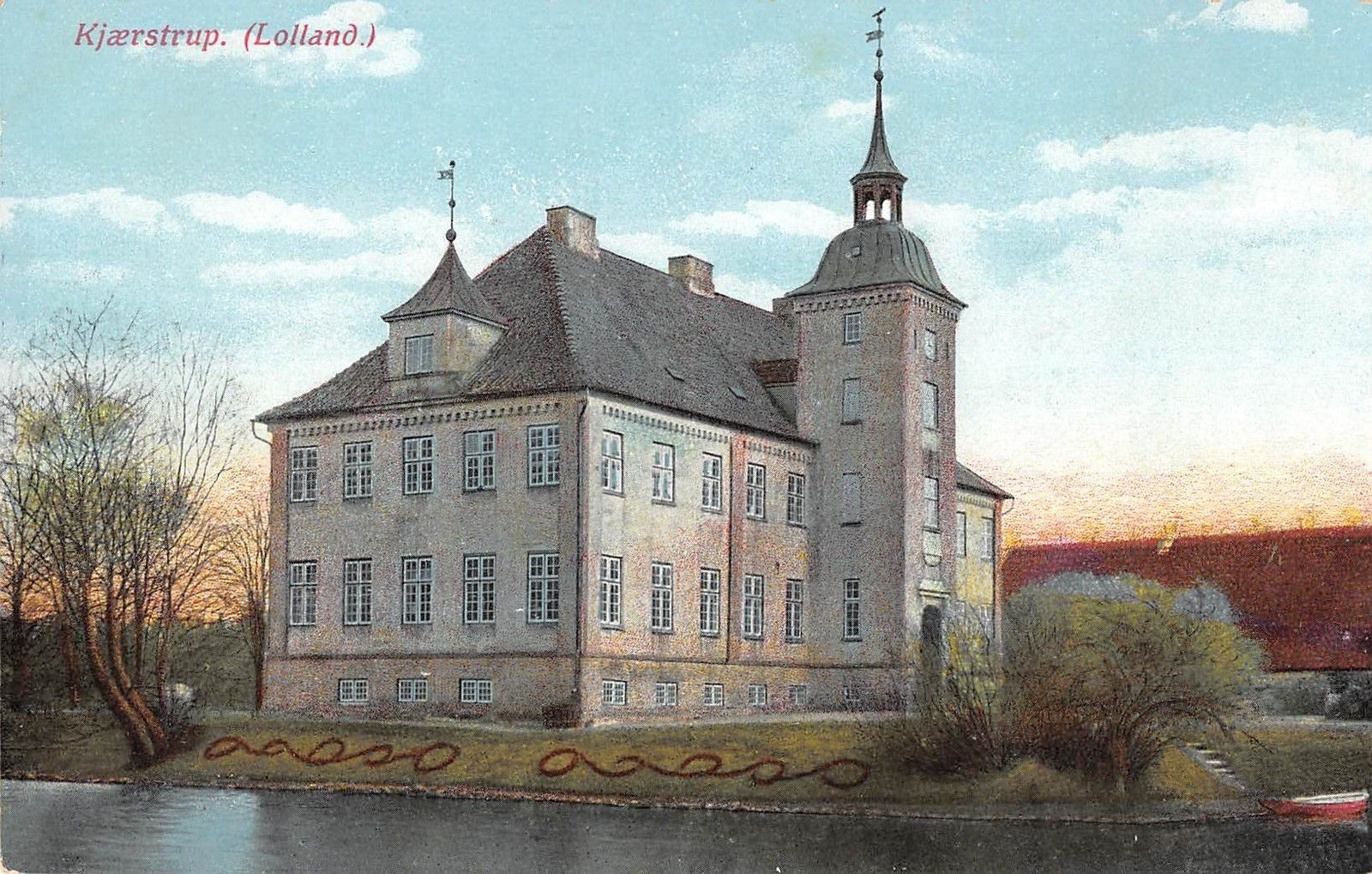
The new main building.

Sophus Frederik Raben-Levetzau inherited Kjærstrup and Bremersvold in 1820 but died just eight years later. His widow, Charlotte Emerentia Rosenkrantz-Huitfeldt, managed the estates after her husband's death with assistance from her nephew, baron Gottlob Rosenkrantz. She wanted to endow the estates to the nephew but this resulted in a legal dispute with the Raben family which had still not been settled at the time of her death in 1843. Two Supreme Court rulings in 1844 and 1850 ended up ceding both estates to the Raben family.

=== Later history ===
In 1852, Kjærstrup was again sold in public auction. The buyer was a consortium who the following year sold it to David Peter Friderichsen after first having sold the copyholds to the copyholders. Friderichsen managed the estate with great skill. His son, Mathias Wilhjelm Friderichsen, in 1851 sold the estate to Lennart Wilhelm Sponneck. In 1972, he sold it to Esper Boel.

== Architecture ==
The two-storey main building was built with timber framing in 1765 but clad with brick in 1836. The vaulted cellars date from circa 1540. The centrally located tower on the facade was built in 1868 under supervision of the architect Ove Petersen. The building is surrounded by moats from the first half of the 16th century. The building was listed on the Danish registry of protected buildings and places in 1918.

The home farm and the bridge across the eastern moat was built in circa 1910.

== Park and grounds ==
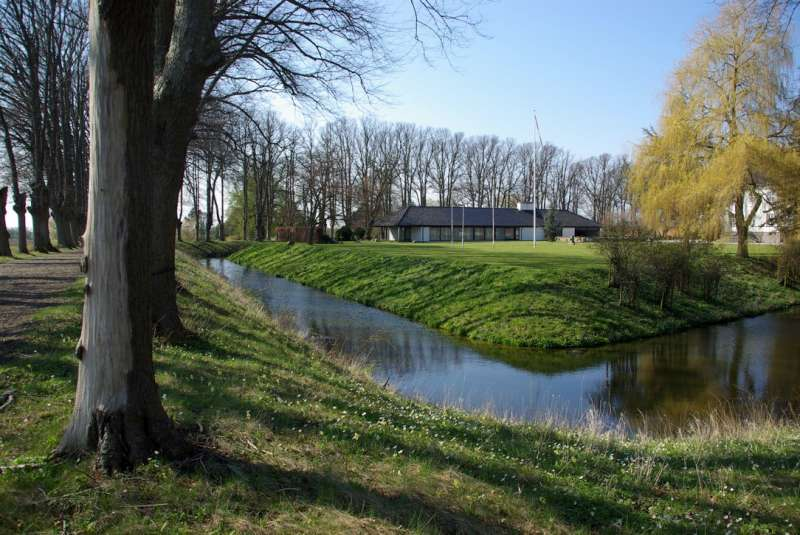
The new main building.

The estate covers 487 hectares of land. A Baroque-style garden from circa 1765 was recreated in circa 1900.

== List of owners ==
- (1369-1390) Anders Siundesen Mule
- (1390-1408) Axel Andersen Mule
- ( - ) Iven Bryske
- (1430- ) Henrik Staverskov Gøye/Mogens Gøye
- (1430- ) Henrik Staverskov Gøye
- ( -1443) Oluf Axelsen Thott
- (1450- ) Bo Due Gøye
- (1463-1494) Anders Staverskov Gøye
- (1498-1550) Knud Gøye
- (1550-1559) Anders Gøye
- (1559-1617) Henning Gøye
- (1617-1618) Karen Skram Pedersdatter, married Brockenhuus
- (1618-1622) Hans Pogwisch
- (1622-1640) Otto Pogwisch
- (1640-1642) Palle Rosenkrantz
- (1642-1652) Birgitte Rosenkrantz
- (1652-1665) Christen Skeel
- (1665-1680) Margrethe Friis
- (1680-1700) Joachim Schack
- (1700-1719) Otto Schack
- (1719-1720) Lisbeth Birgitte Rantzau, married Schack
- (1720-1725) Kronen
- (1725) Emerentia Raben (née von Levetzau)
- (1725-1731) Niels Rosenkrantz Schack
- (1731-1746) Emerentia von Levetzau, married Raben
- (1746-1773) Christian Frederik Raben
- (1773-1819) Sigfred Victor Raben-Levetzau
- (1819-1820) Frederik Sophus Raben-Levetzau
- (1820-1828) Sophus Frederik Raben-Levetzau
- (1828-1843) Charlotte Emerentia Rosenkrantz-Huitfeldt, married Raben-Levetzau
- (1843-1850) Gottlob Rosenkrantz
- (1850-1852) Carl Vilhelm Raben-Levetzau and Josias Raben-Levetzau
- (1852-1853) Consortium consisting of a.o. Frederik Marcus Knuth
- (1853-1902) David Peter Friderichsen
- (1902-1951) Mathias Wilhjelm Friderichsen
- (1951-1972) Lennart Wilhelm Sponneck
- (1972-1986) Esper Boel
- (1986-2001) Olga Johanne Sørensen, married Boel
- (2001- ) Marie-Pierre Boel Andresen
