= Valdemar Henckel =

Danish businessman and real estate developer

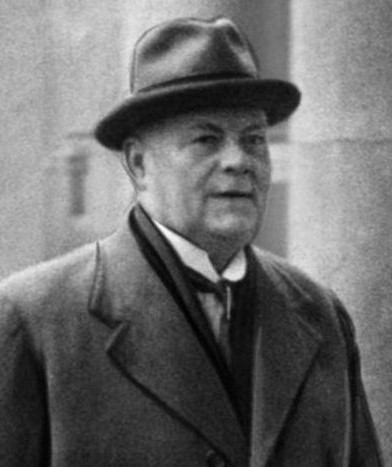
- Born: 1 April 1877; Copenhagen, Denmark
- Died: 16 January 1953 (aged 75); Gentofte, Denmark
- Occupation: Businessman

Valdemar Henckel (1 April 1877 – 16 January 1953) was a Danish businessman and real estate developer. He founded Kalundborg Shipyard in 1918.

== Early life and education ==
Valdemar Petersen was born at Fødselsstiftelsen in Copenhagen. His father died when he was small; his mother then married Oscar Alexander Henckel, a shipbuilder, who adopted her son. Valdemar Henckel then grew up under poor conditions with two younger half brothers. He was initially educated as a shipbuilder and then apprenticed as a mason.

== Career ==
Henckel was active as a real estate developer. His development projects included the housing estates at Christmas Møllers Plads and in the Rysensten Quarter. He lost around 30 properties in the 1907–1908 bank crisis. In 1912 he then established a brickyard at Kalundborg. The bricks were transported by ship; this led him into the shipping industry and then shipbuilding. The outbreak of First World War gave him a lucrative opportunity to make speculative investments in the stock market. In 1918, assisted by Kalundborg og Omegns Bank, he was able to inaugurate Kalundborg Shipyard. Thorvald Stauning attended the inauguration ceremony. It was later followed by shipyards in Marstal and Korsør, several shipping companies, a brewery and a machine factory. The bank went bankrupt in 1921, as did all Henckel's companies. He was sentenced to three years in prison for fraud. After his release, he constructed a number of large residential projects in Copenhagen but in 1940 the company went into receivership. In 1941, he was convicted of embezzlement with peat certifications and in 1947 he was sentenced to eight months in prison for fraud with bonds.

== Personal life ==
Henckel bought Søholt on Lolland in 1937 but it was sold again in 1940. He died on 16 January 1953 in Gentofte and is buried in Hellerup Cemetery.
