= Pæretræet =

Building in Copenhagen, Denmark

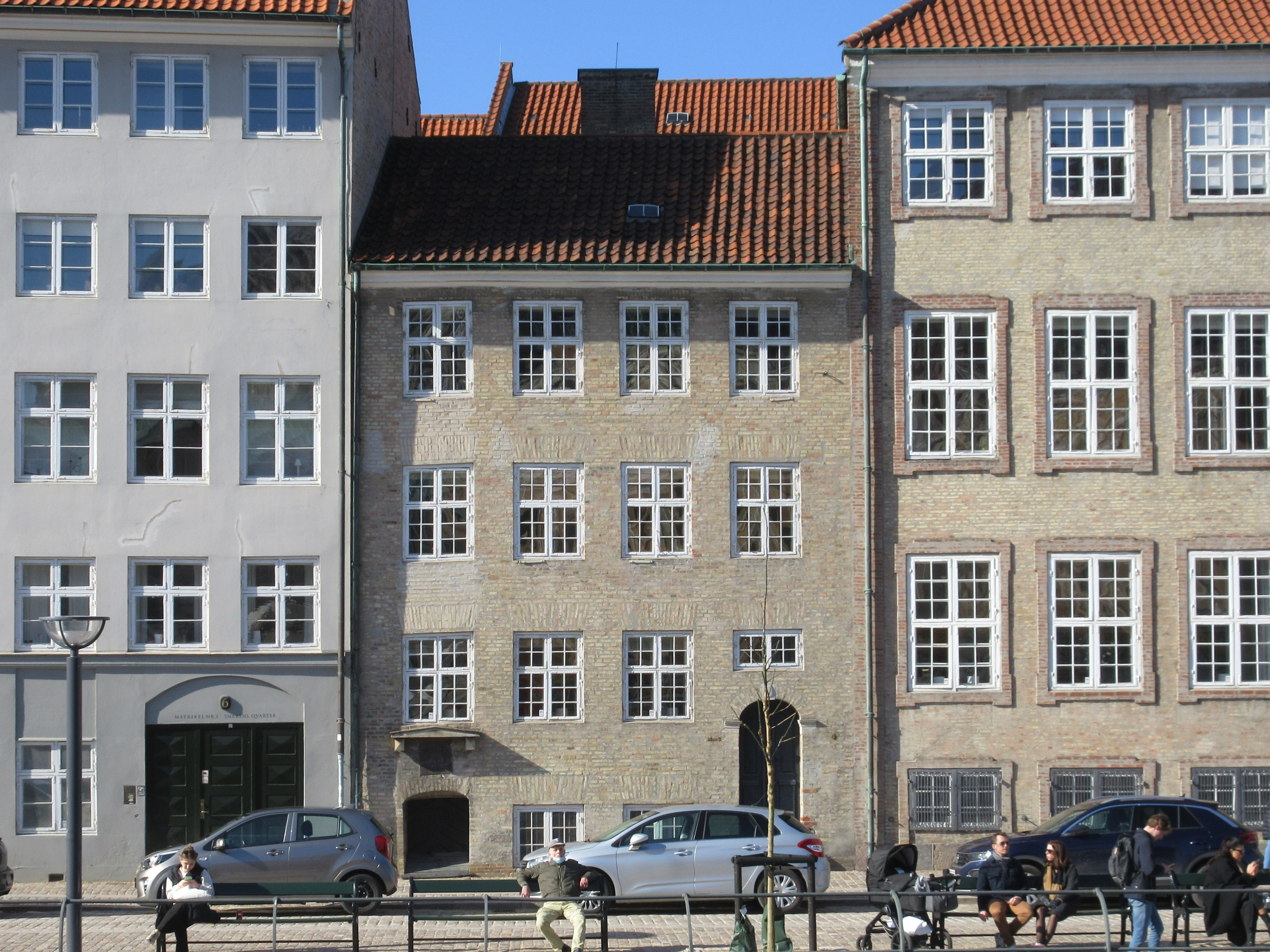
- Interactive map of the Pæretræet area

General information
- Location: Copenhagen, Denmark
- Coordinates: 55°40′36.97″N 12°34′37″E
- Completed: 1730

Pæretræet, literally The Pear Tree is a listed property at Nybrogade 4 in the Old Town of Copenhagen, Denmark. The building was for many years used as residence for the inspector of the rotal pawn house, Assistenshuset, situated next door at No. 2. It was listed in the Danish registry of protected buildings and places in 1918.It takes its name after a pear tree which used to stand three storeys tall in front of it. A stone tablet above the basement entrance features a relief drawing of a pear tree and an inscription.

== History ==
=== 18th century ===
The property was listed in Copenhagen's first cadaswtre fr4om 1689 as No. 4in Snaren's Quarter, owned by Morits Mandixen. The building was together with most of the other buildings in the area destroyed in the Copenhagen Fire of 1728. The present building on the site was constructed in 1729-1730 by the master masons Andreas Sørensen and Lars Erichsen (born before 1700 - died after 1734) for workman at the Royal Orphanage (Bejsenhuset) Hans Blasen. The building received its name after a large pear tree which stood three storeys tall in front of it. Blasen had been licensed as a beer vendor (øltapper) in 1709 and ran his business from the basement. He died in 1737. The operations were then continued by his son Niels Hansen Blasen. He sold the property in around 1845.

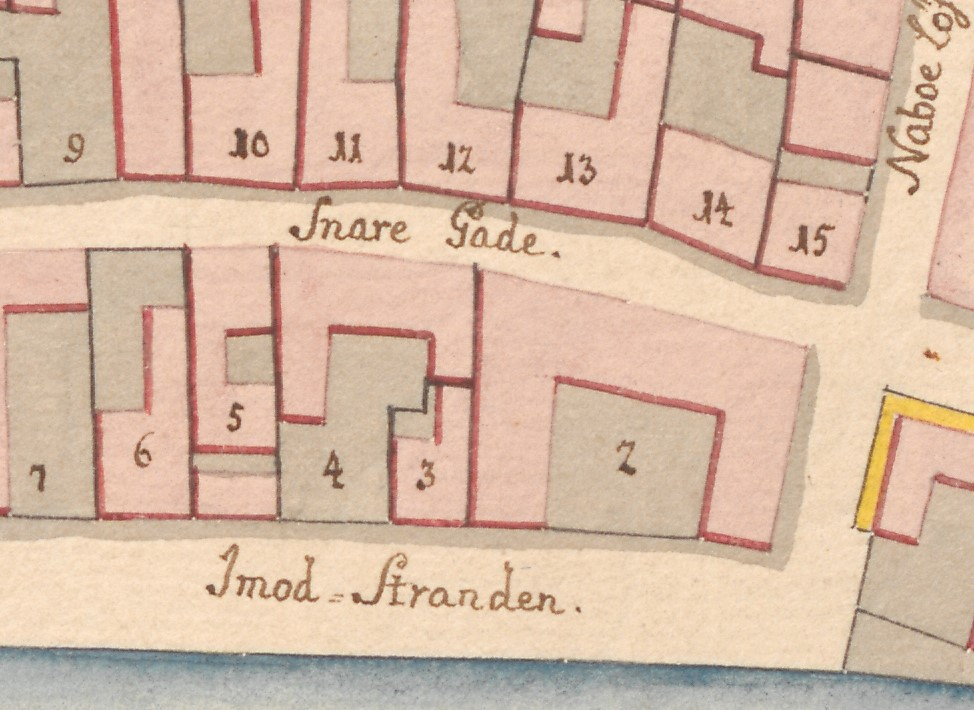
No.4 seen on a detail from Christian Gedde's map of Snaren's Quarter, 1757.

The property was listed in the new cadastre of 1756 as No. 3 in Snaren's Quarter. It was at that time owned by the royal pawn house, Assistenshuset, situated next door. It was for many years used as residence for the inspector of the institution. The inspector was in 1787 Johannes Karlsen. He lived there with his second wife, three children, two of them from his wife's first marriage, and a maid. The property was at the time of the 1787 census also home to two other households. Peder Smidt, the Chancellery Building's fireman, was residing in the building with his son, a servant, a maid and a lodger. Lars Christensen, Møller, A retired stableman from the Royal Mews on the other side of the canal, was living there with his wife.

=== 19th century ===
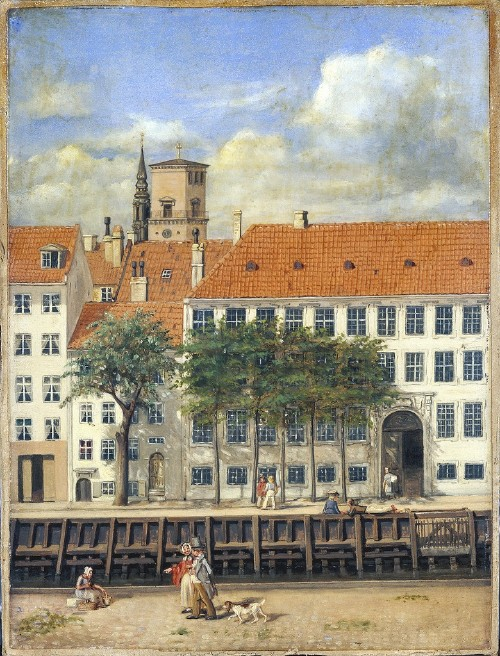
Pæretræet and Assistenshuset in 1840

The property was home to two households at the 1801 census. Georgiane Vissing, a widow, resided in the building with her son Christian Vissing and one maid. Christen Christensen Falslew, a barkeeper, resided in the building with his wife Ane Cathrine Nielsen, their three-year-old daughter and one maid.

The property was in the new cadastre of 1806 listed as No. 2.

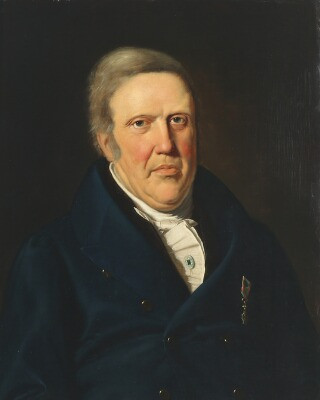
Portrait of Johan Rubring Harboe (1762–1840).

The property was home to 15 residents in three households at the 1840 census. Johan Rubring Harboe (1762–1840), inspecot of the Rpyal Pawn, resided on the first floor with his wife Dorothea Cathrine Elisabeth Mandahl, their six-year-old daughter Signe Bolette Dorothea Harboe and one maid. Johannes Andreas Langballe (1794-1858), a registrator, resided on the ground floor with his wife Else Sophie Dorothea Langballe (née Bjerring), their five children (aged two to 11), his sister Bergitte Kirstine Langballe and one maid. Christiane Lange, a widow, resided in the building with her daughter Rosine Franciska Lange,

== Architecture ==
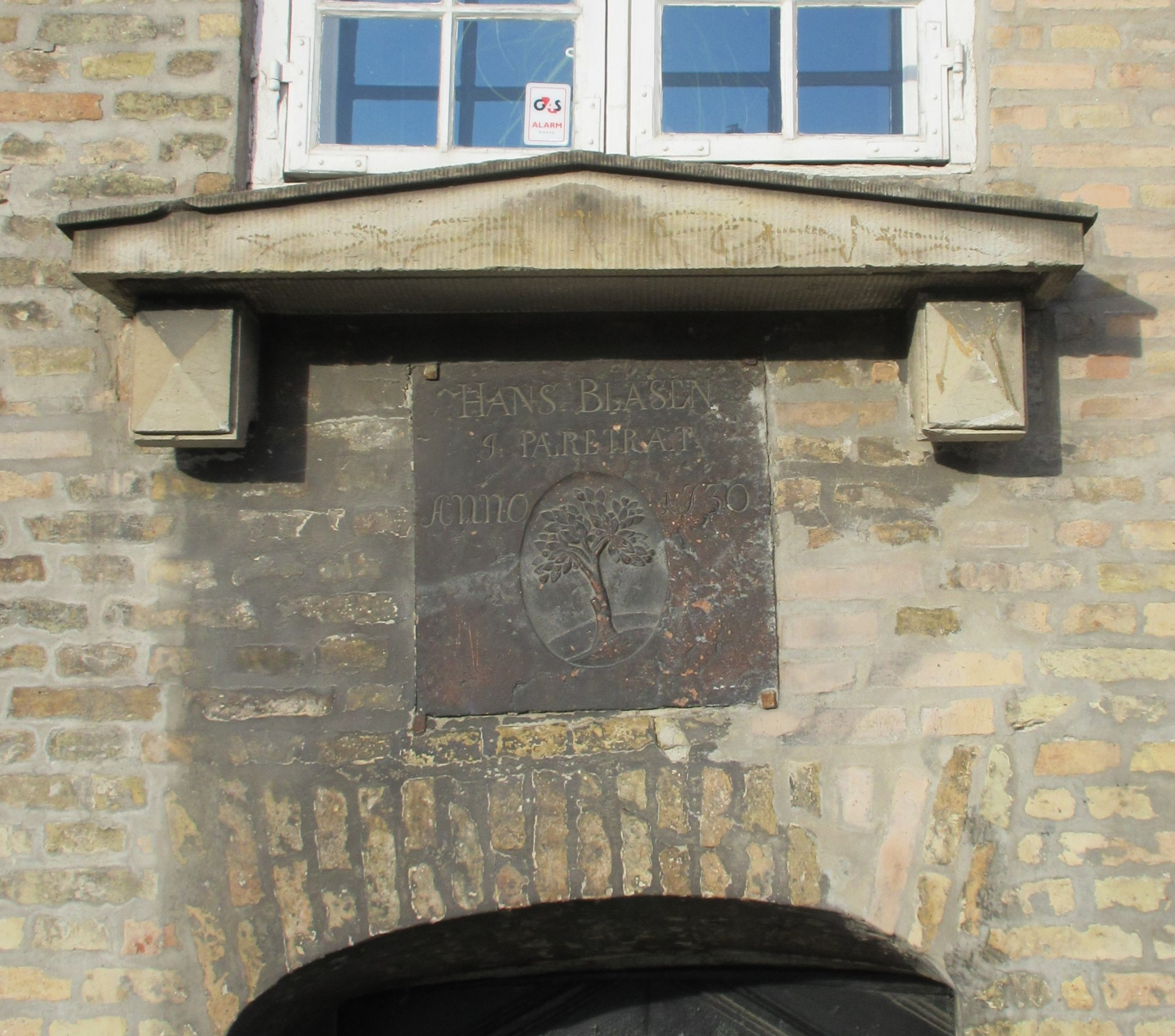
The stone plaque

The building is constructed with three storeys over a walk-out basement and is just four bays wide. Above the basement entrance is a stone plaque with Hans Blasen's name,'Pæretræet' and the year 'Anno 1730' in carved lettering as well as an oval relief featuring a pear tree.

The third storey was added in the 1840s. It replaced a two-storey wall dormer. A two-storey side wing extends from the rear side of the building.

== Gallery ==
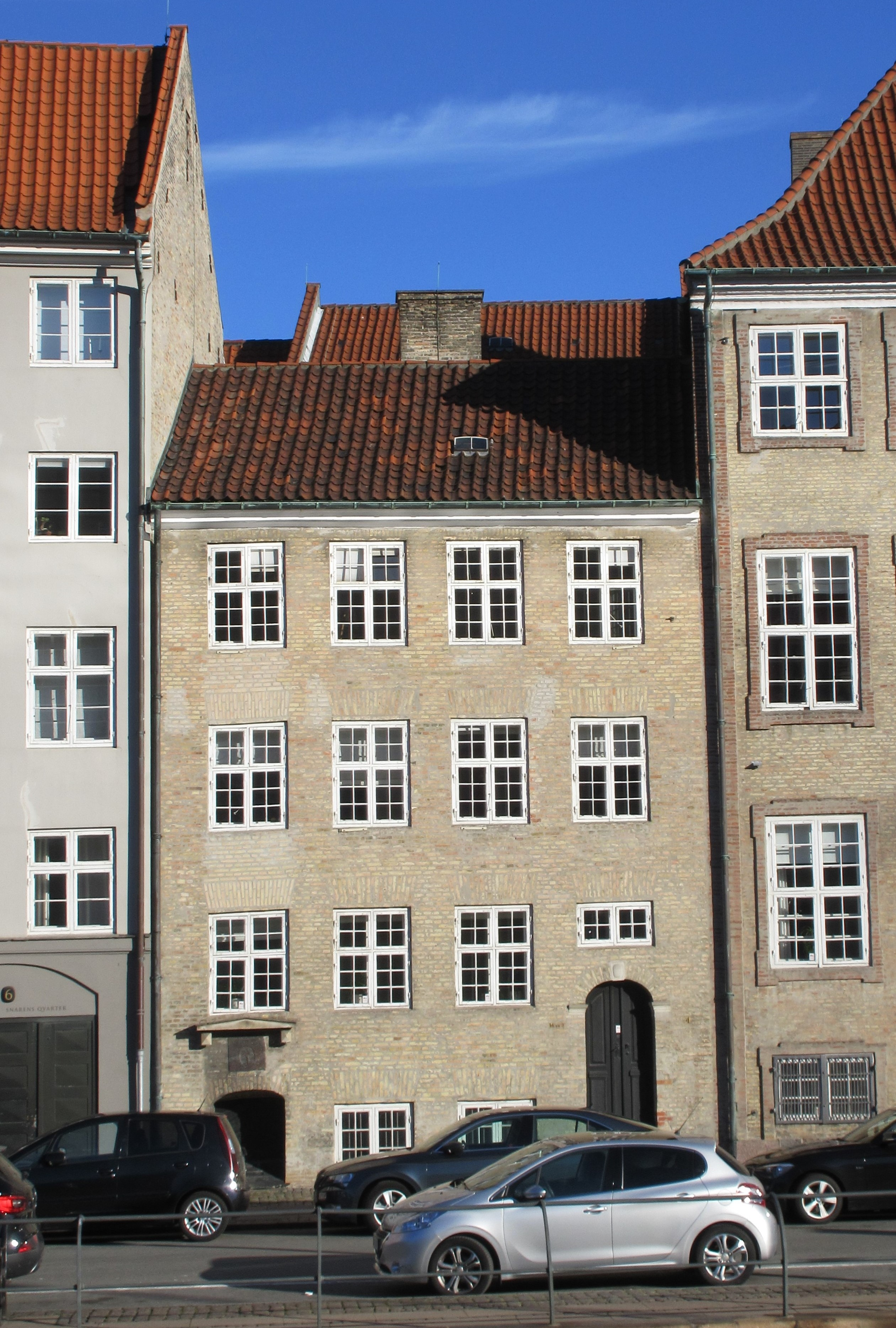
Pæretræet seen from the other side of the canal

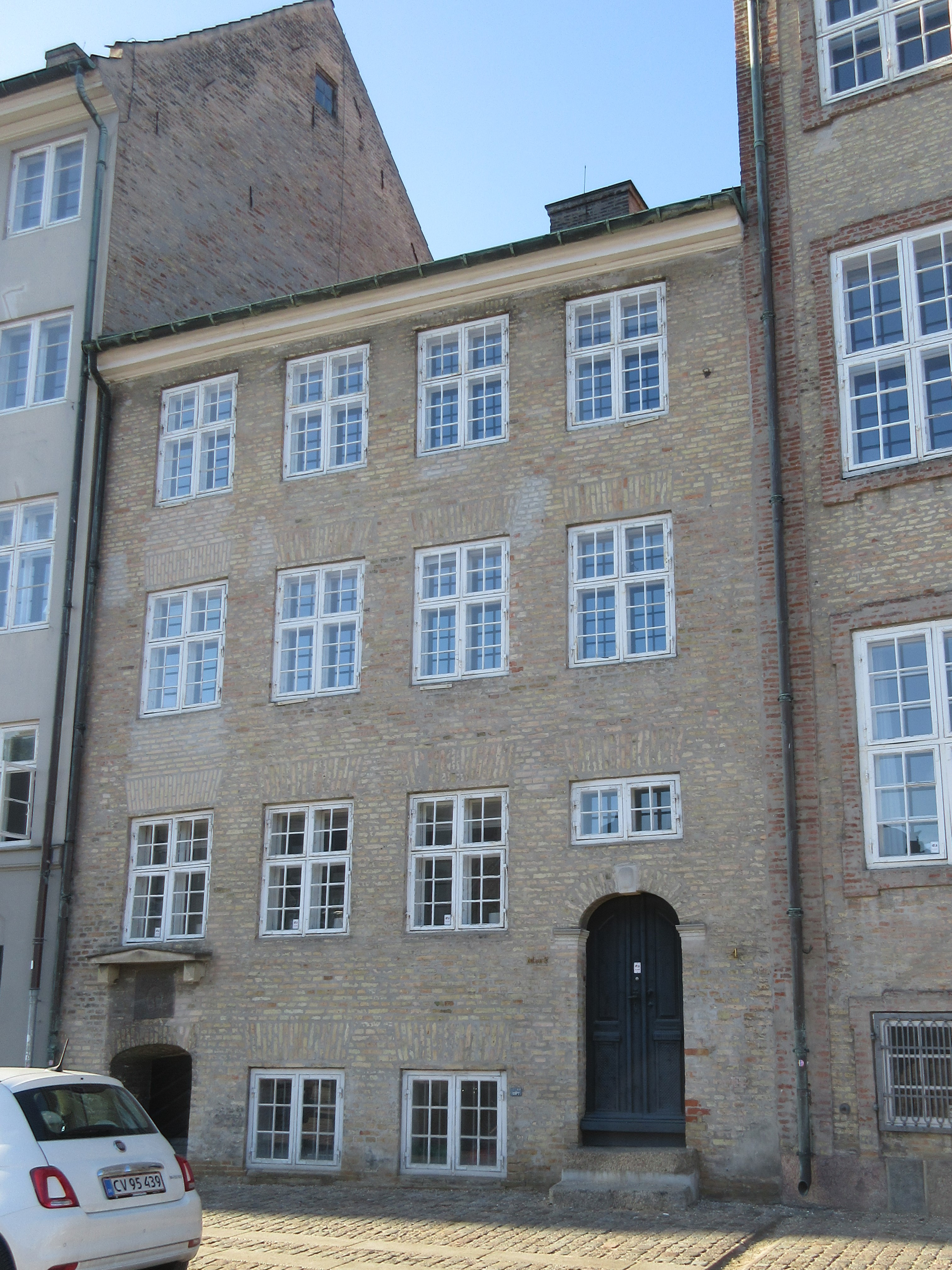

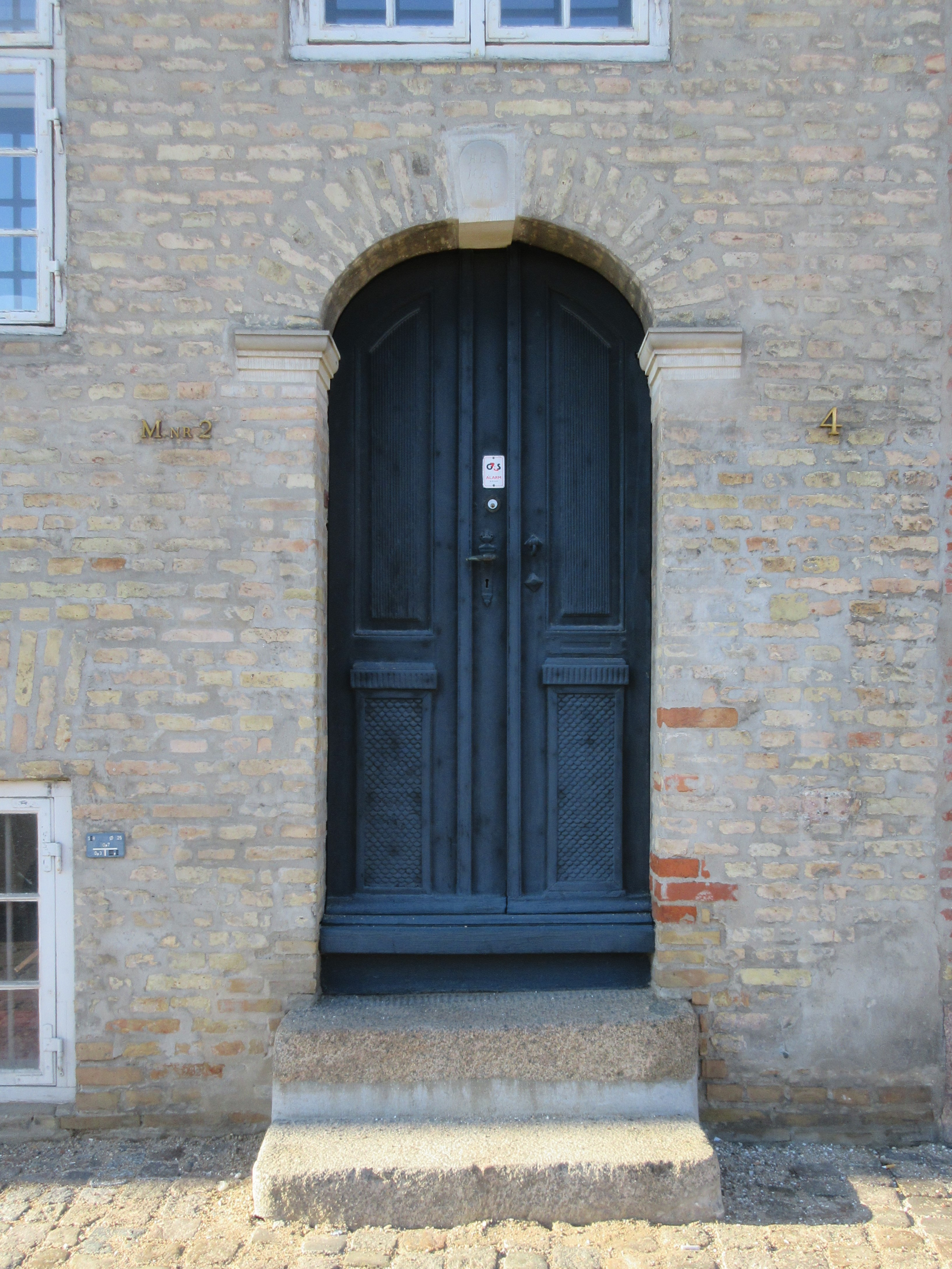
Door

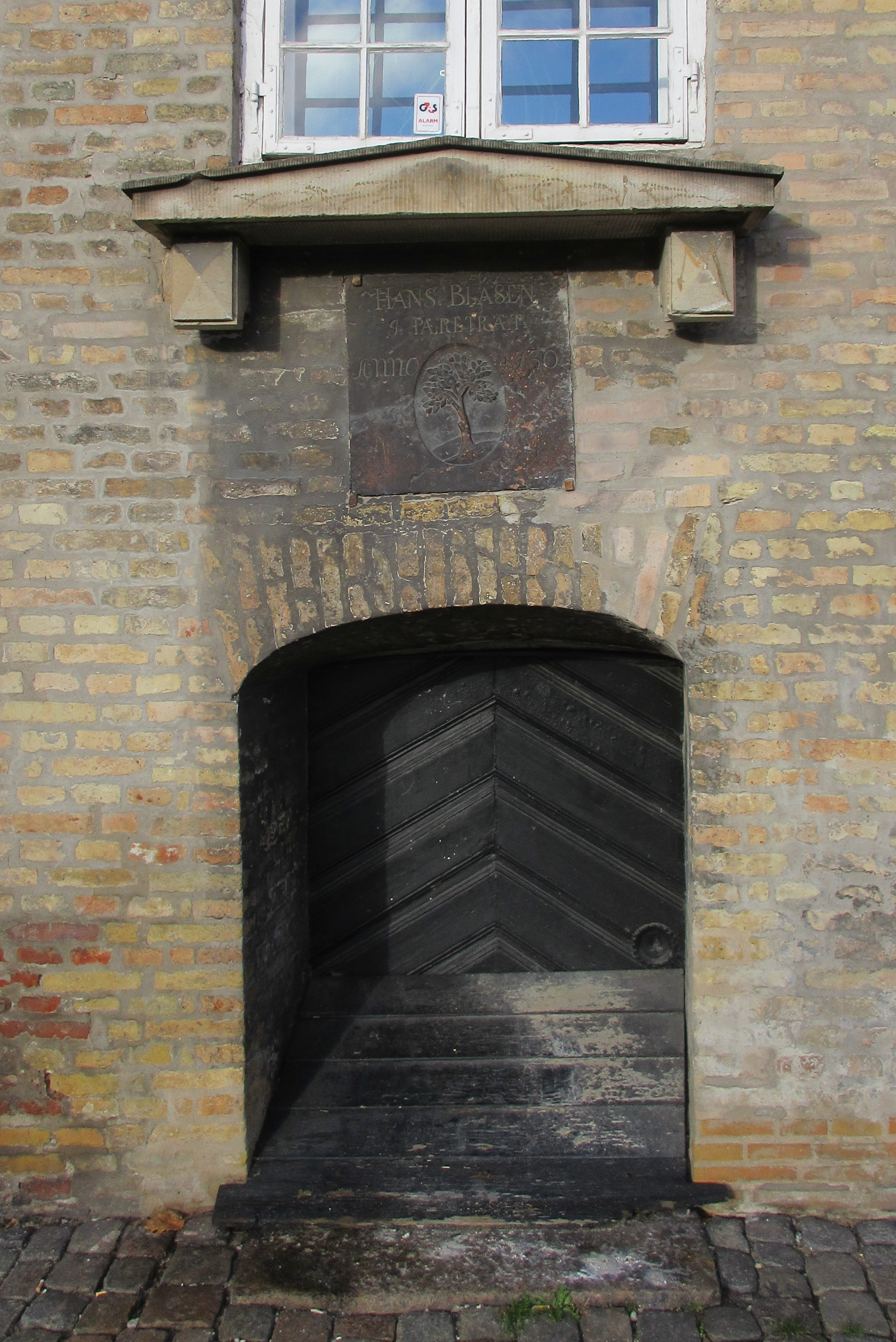
Cellar entrance
