= Bandholm railway station =

Listed railway station building in Denmark

Coordinates: 54°50′09″N 11°28′55″E

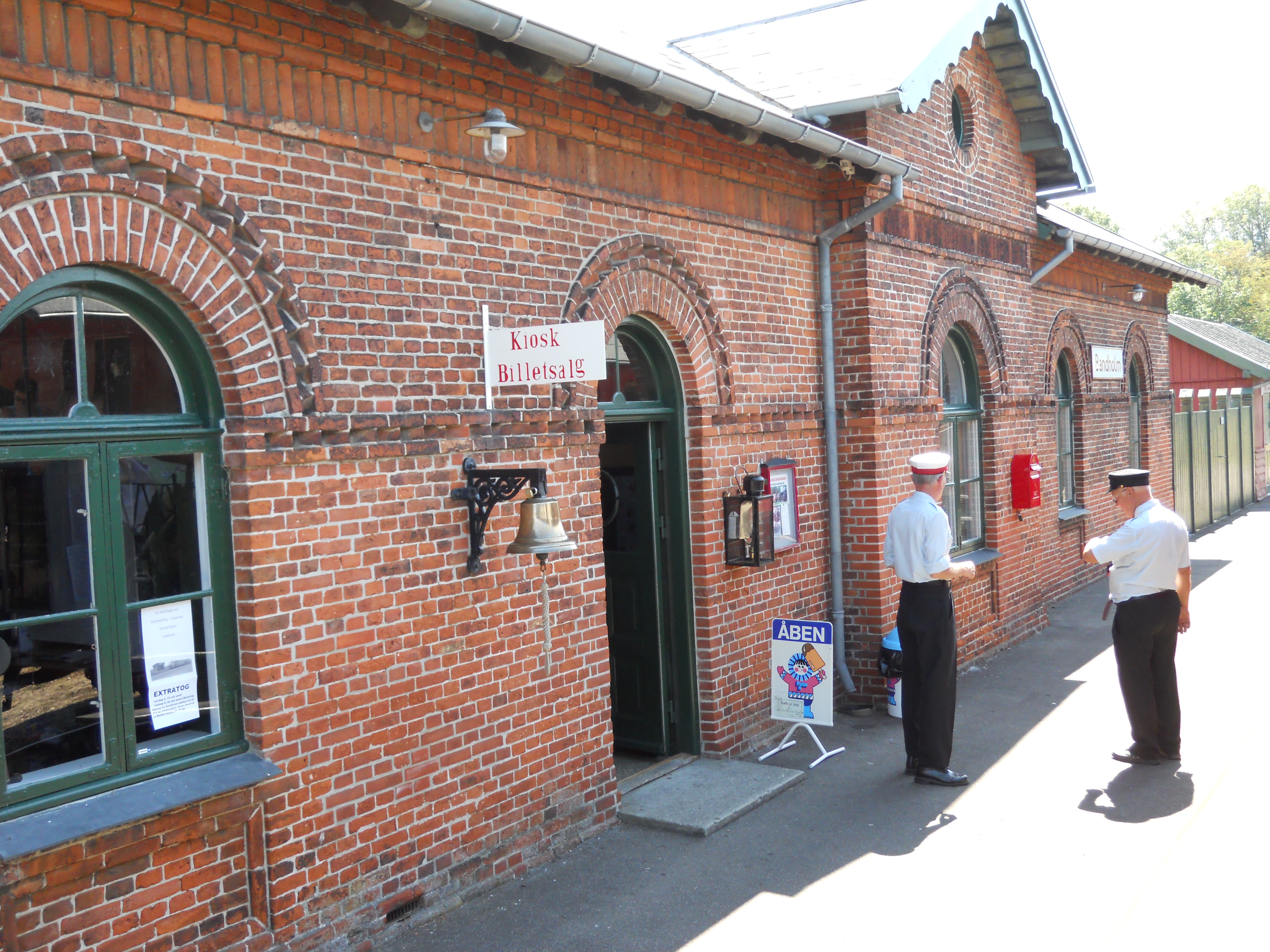
Bandholm railway station.

Bandholm railway station (Danish: Bandholm Jernbanestation) is a decommissioned railway station in Bandholm on the island of Lolland in southeastern Denmark. It is now served by the 7.5-kilometer-long Maribo–Bandholm Heritage Railway.

== History ==
Bandholm railway station was constructed in 1869 as one of the stations on the new Maribo–Bandholm Railway. The building contained a ticket office, a waiting room, a café, a storage room, a post and telegraph office and a residence for the station manager.

The station was inaugurated on 3 November 1869. Trains from Maribo continued from Bandholm railway station to the terminus at Bandholm Harbour.

A warehouse and new house for the railway manager were constructed on a site just north of the station building in 1919–20. The station building was also subject to alterations at this point.

The station building was decommissioned when the Maribo—Bandholm railway was closed on 3 October 1852. In the early 1970s, when a new neighbourhood of single-family detached homes was proposed, the station was threatened by demolition. In 1972, it was instead listed in the Danish registry of protected buildings and places. In 1973, it was let out to the new Maribo–Bandholm Heritage Railway. In 1984, it was sold to the Danish Railway Club.

== Architecture ==
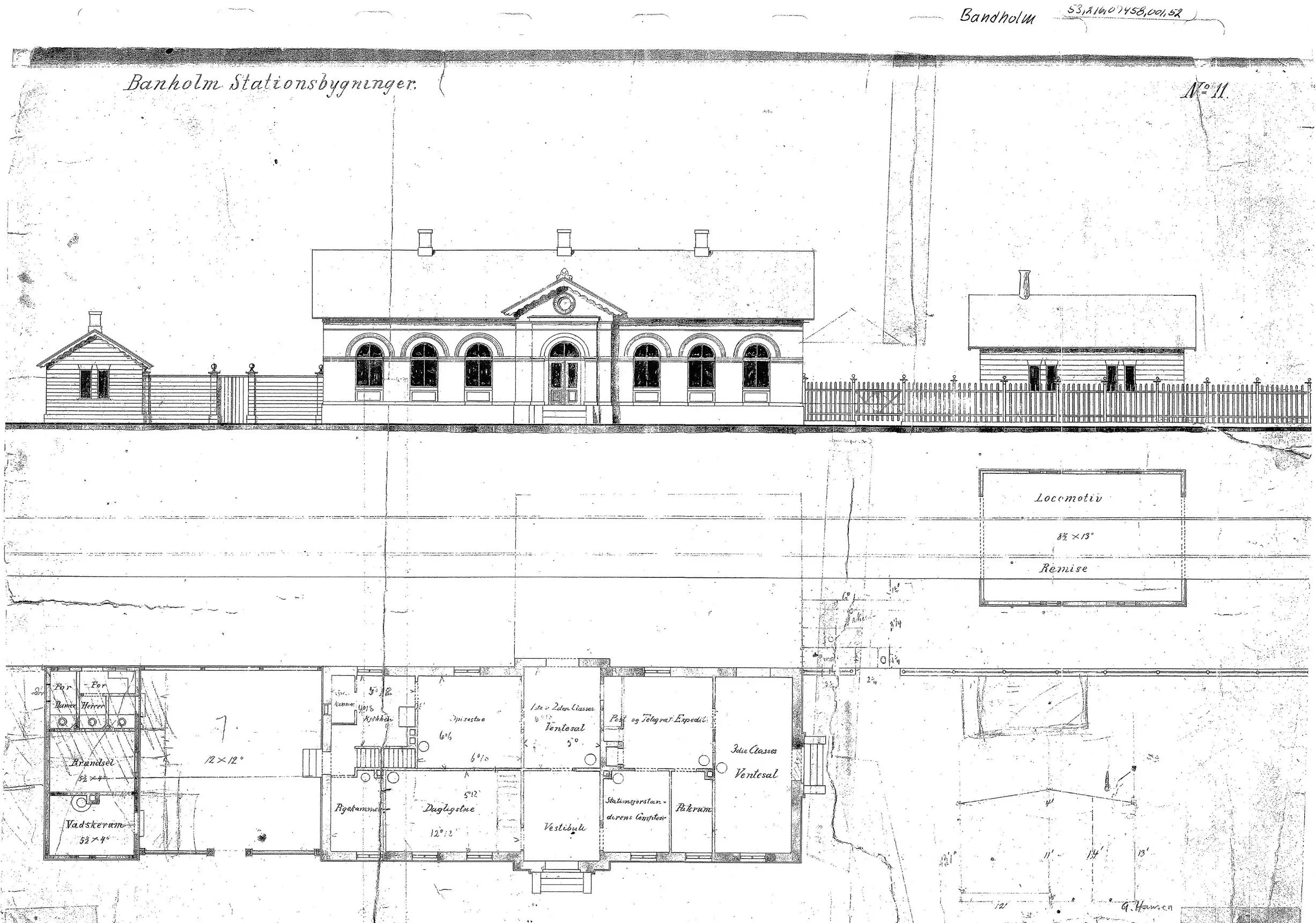
Rendering of the station

Bandholm Railway Station is a simple Historicist building constructed in red brick. The building features a gabled avant-corps on each side. The facade is finished with a dentillated cornice as well as a belt course aligning with the base of the arched part of the windows. The roof is clad in slate. The roof ridge is pierced by three chimneys.
