= Old Pharmacy, Nakskov =

Historic building in Nakskov, Denmark

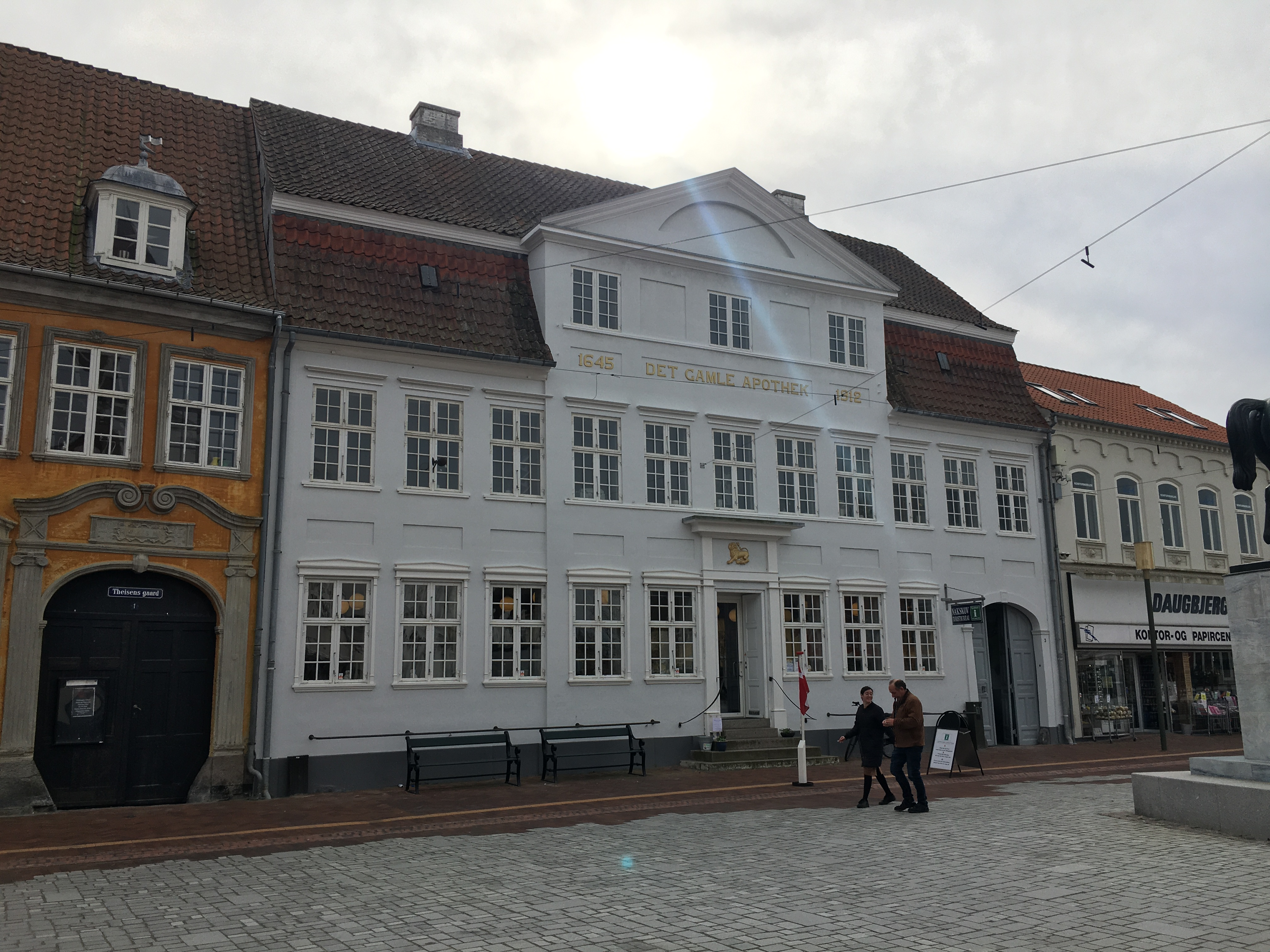
The Old Pharmacy in Nakskov

The Old Pharmacy (Danish: Det Gamle Apotek), formerly Nakskov Lion Pharmacy (Nakskov Løve Apotek), is a former pharmacy located at Axeltorv 3 in Nakskov, Denmark. The complex consists of a main building from 1777 and another building from the 17th century, which were both listed on the Danish registry of protected buildings and places in 1919.

== History ==
Nakskov Lion Pharmacy was founded on 27 September 1645 by Christian Sverus. The name was changed to Nakskov Gamle Apotek when Nakskov Ny Apotek (later Nybro Apotek) opened in 1913. The old pharmacy was converted into a branch of Nakskov Nybro Pharmacy on 01 December 1978. The name Nakskov Løve Apotek (Naskov Lion Pharmacy) was transferred to Nakskov Nybro Apotek on 12 December 1994. The old pharmacy closed on 30 September 1995.

== Building ==
The pharmacy consists of a main building from 1777 and a side wing from the 17th century. Both building were listed on the Danish registry of protected buildings and places in 1919.
