= Gloslunde Rectory =

Listed building in Denmark

- Gloslunde Præstegård
- Interactive map of the Gloslunde Rectory area

General information
- Location: Stenvadsvej 2-4, Lolland, Denmark
- Coordinates: 54°45′21.78″N 11°13′22.98″E
- Completed: 17th century

Gloslunde Rectory (Danish: Gloslunde Præstegård) is a four-winged, thatched building situated next to Gloslunde Church on Lolland, Denmark. The building was listed in the Danish registry of protected buildings and places in 1950.

== History ==
Gloslunde Rectory dates from the 17th century. The building complex has later undergone numerous alterations and renovations with the reuse of old timber and bricks. This was not least the case during Thorgeir Guðmundsson's years as pastor from 1839. In 1849, Guðmundsson was transferred to Nysted and Herridslev.

== Architecture ==
Gloslunde Rectory consists of four white-plastered, half-timbered wings surrounding a central courtyard. The northern gable of the residential wing and the eastern gable of the former stable wing have been reconstructed in brickwork. The upper part of some of the gables are constructed with visible timber framing and others are clad with vertical boarding. The central courtyard is accessed via a gateway in the north wing. The half-hipped roofs are thatched with the use of a technique which is characteristic for the island of Lolland. The roof of the principal residential wing features two small dormers.
