= Queen's Warehouse, Nakskov =

Queen's Warehouse
- Dronningens Pakhus
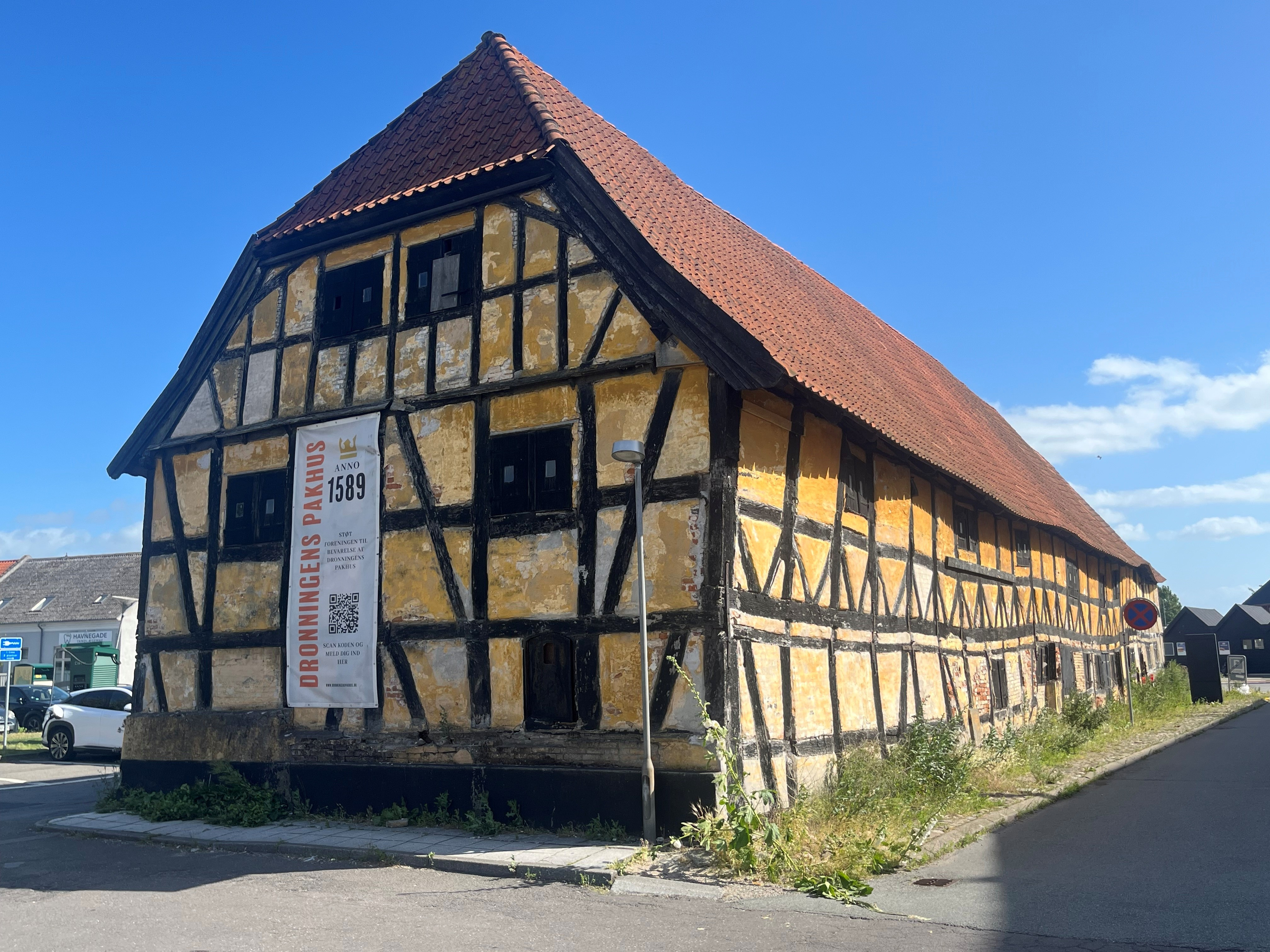
- Queen's Warehouse in 2026.
- Interactive map of the Queen's Warehouse area

General information
- Location: Nakskov, Denmark
- Coordinates: 54°49′43.39″N 11°8′16.01″E
- Completed: 1599
- Renovated: 18th century

The Queen's Warehouse (Danish: Dronningen's Pakhus) is a two-storey, half-timbered warehouse situated on the harbourfront in Nakskov on the island of Lolland in southeastern Denmark. It was listed in the Danish registry of protected buildings and places in 1965.

== History ==
Dowager queen Sophie was a major landowner on the islands of Lolland and Falster. Her estates included Halsted Priory. The warehouse in Nakskov was constructed for her in 1589–91. It was used for the storage of langgildekorn, a sort of tithe paid by the farmers to the local landlord in that day. It was listed in the Danish registry of protected buildings and places in 1965.

== Architecture ==
The two-storey, halftimbered warehouse is 30 bays long. The timber is black-painted and the infills are yellow. The southern gable of the building was reconstructed in yellow brick in the 19th century. The roof is clad in red tile. It northern end is half-hipped. The eastern side of the building features a gabled wall dormer with an intact pulley.
