= Søholt =

Manor house in Lolland, Denmark

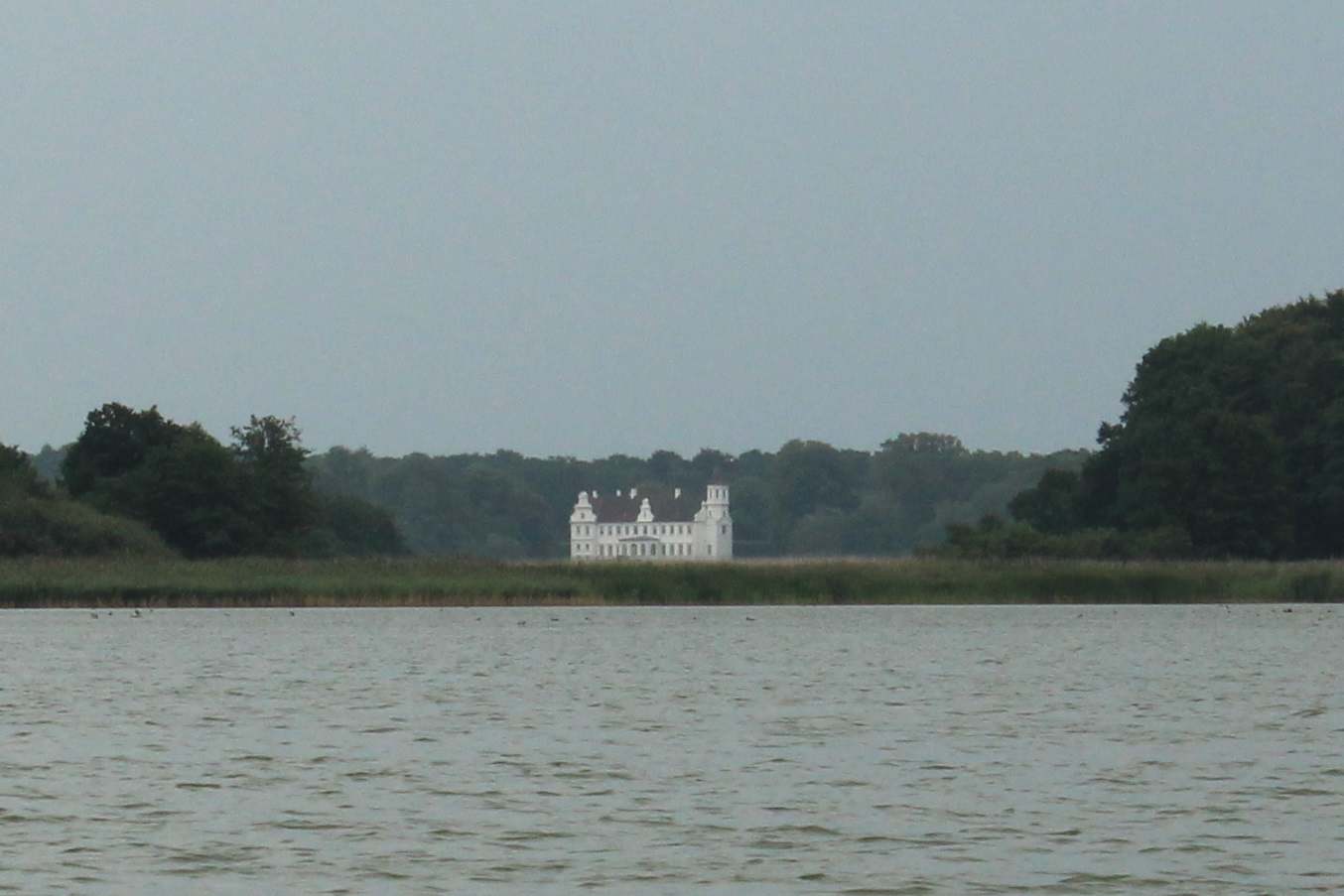
- Søholt seen from across the Maribo Lakes

General information
- Architectural style: Renaissance Revival
- Location: Søholtvej 41 >br/> 4930 Maribo, Denmark
- Coordinates: 54°44′28″N 11°32′20″E
- Completed: 1804

Søholt is a manor house located on the southern shore of the Maribo Lakes on Lolland in southeastern Denmark. The main building is from 1804 but was adapted to the Renaissance Revival style in the second half of the 19th century. The Baroque-style garden is open to the public.

On the small peninsula Skelsnæs stands a garden pavilion from 1822. The Skelsnæs Pavilion was listed in the Danish registry of protected buildings and places in 1996.

== History ==
=== Early history ===
The manor was established by Morten Venstermand in the middle of the 16th century. His widow, Anne Andersdatter Galt, brought Søholt into her second marriage to Falk Axelsen Brahe. He struggled with economic difficulties and therefore chose to sell Søholt to his brother-in-law Eiler Quitzow in 1618.

Henrik Heest, a nobleman from Holstein, purchased Søholt from Quitzow in 1624. In 1637, it was sold by his nephew to Jobst Frederik von Papenheim. Papenheim had shortly after his arrival in Denmark won the favour of the king and had therefore been appointed as squire (kammerjunker) for crown prince Christian. He constructed a new main building in 1647. It consisted of two two-storey, half-timbered buildings. The one to the east was the main wing. The one to the west contained a scullery, washroom and residential quarters for staff.

=== Lützow family ===
Papenheim's widow Regitze Knudsdatter kept the estate after his death in 1649 but ravaging and looting Swedish troops left it in a poor condition after the Swedish Wars. The reconstruction was financed by pledging the estate. Henning Ulrich von Lützow, a creditor, took over the estate in 1790. Lützow expanded the main building into a three-winged complex in the fashionable Italian style. A chapel was in 1698 inaugurated by Thomas Kingo in the east wing. Lützow also adapted he garden to a more modern garden à la française design. In 1691, he was appointed as Prefect of Lolland Falster and County Governor of NyKøbing County. His luxurious lifestyle was later continued by his son, Christian Frederik von Lützow, who inherited Søholt in 1722.

=== The Krogh family ===
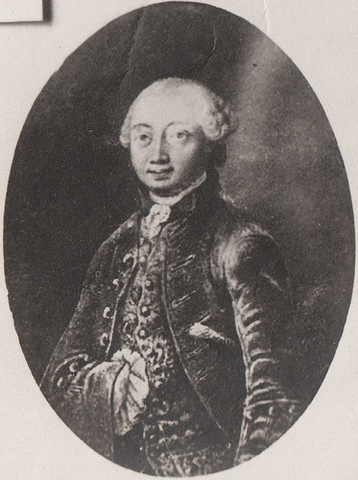
Gotske Hans von Krogh

Lützow's wife, Anna Sophie Holsten, who became a widow in 1759, sold Søholt and the other estates to their son-in-la Hans von Krogh. Krogh had no children and in 1784 ceded Søholt to his nephew, Godske Hans von Krogh the Younger. After his early death, in 1790, Søholt passed to his brother, Caspar Hermann von Krogh, who would however only survive his brother by a year. On his death bed he married his late brother's fiancé, Elisabeth Catharina Lehn. She was a daughter of Poul Abraham Lehn, Baron of Hvidkilde and Guldborgsund. A few years later, in 1796, she then married Julian Christian von Bertouch, but they would only have five years together since she died just 20 years old on a journey to Dresden in October 1802.

=== The Bertouch family ===
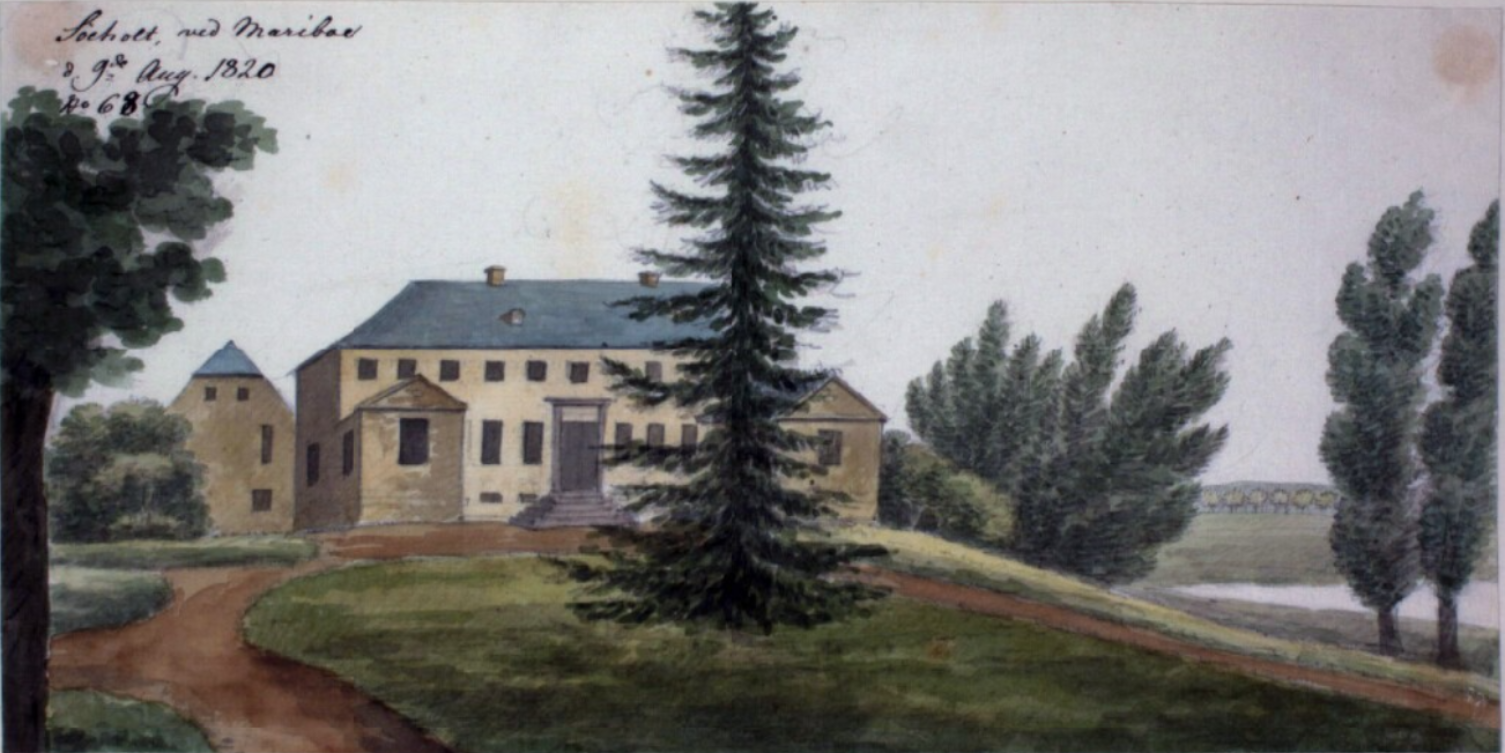
Ole Jørgen Rawert: Søholt, 9 August 1820

Bertouch married Louise Juliane von Wallmoden in 1803. He constructed a new main wing between the two main wings in 1804. The couple would later gather many prominent artists and writers on the estate in the summer time, including BBertel Thorvaldsen and Adam Oehlenschläger.

Julian Christian and Louise Juliane von Bertouch died just two days apart in September 1831 and Søholt was then sold at auction.

=== Later history ===
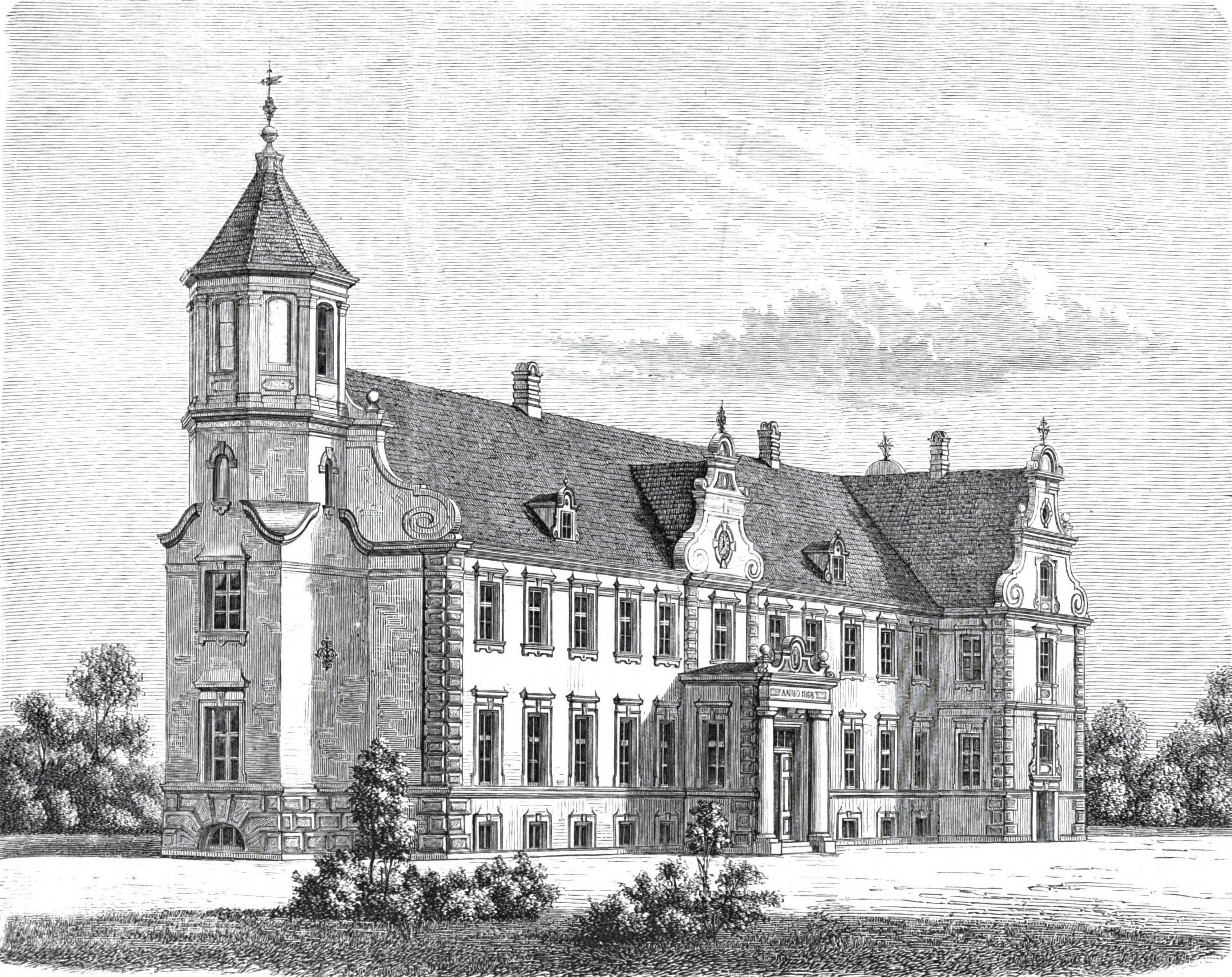
Søholt in 1870

The new owner was Laurits Kierkegaard. In 1852, Søholt was again sold at auction. The new owner was Laurits Jørgensen. He demolished the two side wings in 1853 and adapted the main wing the following year. He was after his death in 1889 succeeded by his son Henrik Jørgensen and then his grandson Poul Christian Clausen Jørgensen.

In 1917, Søholt was acquired by the broker Peter Ole Suhr. He was hit by economic difficulties during the economic crisis and Søhholt was therefore, in 1937, taken over by Creditkassen for Landejendomme i Østifterne. The mortgage fund sold it to Valdemar Henckel, the owner of Kalundborg Shipyard. In 1940, he sold it to Eiler Marcher (1904-1975).

== Architecture ==
The main building is designed in the Renaissance Revival style with Flammish gables. It is a whitewashed two-storey building with a short cross wing to the east and a short tower to the west.

== Today ==
Søholt is today owned by Frederik von Lüttichau. The Engestofte-Søholt estate covers 937.50 hectares of land.

== List of owners ==
- (1576-1610) Morten Venstermand
- (1610-1616) Anne Andersdatter Galt, gift 1) Venstermand og 2) Brahe
- (1616-1618) Falk Brahe
- (1618-1624) Eiler Quitzow
- (1624-1628) Henrik Heest
- (1628-1636) Nevøer og niecer til Henrik Heest
- (1636-1637) Benedict Heest
- (1637-1649) Jobst Frederik von Papenheim
- (1649-1679) Regitze Knudsdatter Urne, gift von Papenheim
- (1679-1685) Georg von Papenheim
- (1785) Thomas Groot
- (1685-1690) Christian von Papenheim
- (1685-1722) Henning Ulrik von Lützow
- (1722-1730) Anna Magdalene von Hardenberg, gift von Lützow
- (1735-1759) Christian Frederik von Lützow
- (1759-1760) Anna Sophie Holsten, gift von Lützow
- (1760-1784) Godske Hans von Krogh
- (1784-1790) Godske Hans von Krogh den Yngre
- (1790-1791) Caspar Hermann von Krogh
- (1791-1796) Elisabeth Catharina Lehn, gift 1) von Krogh og 2) von Bertouch
- (1796-1831) Frederik Julian Christian von Bertouch
- (1831-1842) Laurits Kierkegaard
- (1842-1852) Dødsboet efter Laurits Kierkegaard
- (1852-1889) Laurits Jørgensen
- (1889-1892) Henrik Jørgensen
- (1892-1917) Poul Christian Clausen Jørgensen
- (1917-1937) Peter Ole Suhr
- (1937) Creditkassen for Landejendomme i Østifterne
- (1937-1940) Valdemar Henckel
- (1940-1975) Eiler Marcher
- (1975-1995) Frants Marcher
- (1994) William Erik Berntsen
- (1994-1995) William Odd Berntsen
- (1995-2003) Berntsen Fonden
- (2003- ) Frederik von Lüttichau
