= Listed buildings in Lolland Municipality =

This is a list of listed buildings In Lolland Municipality, Denmark.

== The list ==
=== 483 Dannemare ===
Listing name	Image	Location	Coordinates	Sescription
Gloslunde Rectory		Stenvadsvej 2, 4983 Dannemare		
Gloslunde Rectory		Stenvadsvej 2, 4983 Dannemare		
Gloslunde Rectory		Stenvadsvej 2, 4983 Dannemare		
Gloslunde Rectory		Stenvadsvej 4, 4983 Dannemare		
Rudbjerggaard		Hovvasen 6, 4983 Dannemare		

=== 4895 Errindlev ===
Listing name	Image	Location	Coordinates	Sescription
Errindlev tidl. Andelsmejeri		Errindlevvej 34B, 4895 Errindlev		
Errindlev tidl. Andelsmejeri		Errindlevvej 34B, 4895 Errindlev		
Errindlev tidl. Andelsmejeri		Errindlevvej 34B, 4895 Errindlev		

=== 4900 Nakskov ===
Listing name	Image	Location	Coordinates	Sescription
Axeltorv 1: Theisen House		Axeltorv 1A, 4900 Nakskov		
Axeltorv 1: Theisen House		Axeltorv 1, 4900 Nakskov		
Axeltorv 1: Theisen House		Havnegade 55, 4900 Nakskov		
Axeltorv 1: Theisen House		Havnegade 55, 4900 Nakskov		
Axeltorv 3: Nakskov Pharmacy		Axeltorv 3, 4900 Nakskov	54°49′48.49″N 11°8′9.2″E	Former pharmacy from 1777
Axeltorv 3: Nakskov Pharmacy		Axeltorv 3, 4900 Nakskov	54°49′48.12″N 11°8′9.2″E	Side wing from the 17th century
Halsted Priory		Ullerslevvej 44, 4900 Nakskov	54°50′47.41″N 11°13′31.99″E	Gothic Revival style main building from 1847-49
Halsted Priory		Ullerslevvej 42, 4900 Nakskov	54°50′47.41″N 11°13′31.99″E	Queen Sofie's House: Old main building from 1589-91 by Hans von Andorf
Halsted Priory		Ullerslevvej 42, 4900 Nakskov	54°50′47.41″N 11°13′31.99″E	Herskabsstalden: Stable from 1855.
Halsted Priory		Ullerslevvej 42, 4900 Nakskov	54°50′47.41″N 11°13′31.99″E	Stable from 1744
Halsted Priory		Maribovej 248, 4900 Nakskov	54°50′52.02″N 11°13′31.99″E	Hald-timbered house.
Halsted Priory		Maribovej 250, 4900 Nakskov	54°50′52.89″N 11°13′31.99″E	Havehuset: Half-timbered house from the beginning of the 19th century
Halsted Priory		Maribovej 250, 4900 Nakskov	54°50′52.89″N 11°13′31.99″E	Outbuilding.
Halsted Priory		Maribovej 252, 4900 Nakskov	54°50′53.17″N 11°13′31.99″E	Three-winged, half-timbered rehouse.
Halsted Priory		Maribovej 252, 4900 Nakskov	54°50′53.17″N 11°13′31.99″E	Outbuilding.
Halsted Priory (Maribovej 281-289)		Maribovej 281, 4900 Nakskov	54°50′52.27″N 11°13′38.73″E	
Halsted Priory (Maribovej 281-289)		Maribovej 283, 4900 Nakskov	54°50′52.6″N 11°13′38.73″E	
Halsted Priory (Maribovej 281-289)		Maribovej 283, 4900 Nakskov	54°50′52.6″N 11°13′38.73″E	
Halsted Priory (Maribovej 281-289)		Maribovej 285, 4900 Nakskov	54°50′52.46″N 11°13′38.73″E	
Halsted Priory (Maribovej 281-289)		Maribovej 285, 4900 Nakskov	54°50′52.46″N 11°13′38.73″E	
Halsted Priory (Maribovej 281-289)		Maribovej 289, 4900 Nakskov	54°50′53.2″N 11°13′38.73″E	
Halsted Priory (Maribovej 291-297)		Maribovej 291, 4900 Nakskov	54°50′54.59″N 11°13′59.16″E	
Halsted Priory (Maribovej 291-297)		Maribovej 291, 4900 Nakskov	54°50′54.59″N 11°13′59.16″E	
Halsted Priory (Maribovej 291-297)		Maribovej 293, 4900 Nakskov	54°50′54.76″N 11°13′59.16″E	
Halsted Priory (Maribovej 291-297)		Maribovej 297, 4900 Nakskov	54°50′54.87″N 11°13′59.16″E	
Halsted Priory: The old inn		Maribovej 277, 4900 Nakskov	54°50′50.42″N 11°13′30.45″E	
Halsted Priory: The old forge		Maribovej 279, 4900 Nakskov	54°50′51.58″N 11°13′34.16″E	Former forge om brick from c. 1850
Halsted Priory: The old forge		Maribovej 279, 4900 Nakskov	54°50′51.58″N 11°13′34.16″E	Residential building for the smith from the early 10th century
Kappel Windmill		Kappelvej 4C, 4900 Nakskov	54°46′26.77″N 11°2′10.25″E	Post mill from c. 1730
Købelev Rectory		Præstegårdsvej 42, 4900 Nakskov	54°53′55.93″N 11°7′22.24″E	Rectory from 1769
N.E. Balles Barndomshjem		Vestenskov Kirkevej 4, 4900 Nakskov		
N.E. Balles Barndomshjem		Vestenskov Kirkevej 4, 4900 Nakskov		
Nordenkirke 17		Nordenkirke 17, 4900 Nakskov	54°49′52.9″N 11°8′6.29″E	Building from 1857
Præstestræde 2		Præstestræde 2A, 4900 Nakskov		
Søndergade 25		Søndergade 25, 4900 Nakskov		
Queen's Warehouse		Havnegade 73, 4900 Nakskov	54°49′43.4″N 11°8′16.01″E	Warehouse from c. 1600 of which one of the gables was replaced in the 19th century

=== 4913 Horslunde ===
Listing name	Image	Location	Coordinates	Sescription
Reventlow Asylum		Pederstrupvej 3, 4913 Horslunde		
Vindeby Windmill		Marrebæksvej 22, 4913 Horslunde	54°55′14.19″N 11°8′27.64″E	Snick nill from c. 1800

=== 4930 Maribo ===
Listing name	Image	Location	Coordinates	Sescription
Bangshave		Meinckes Vej 1, 4930 Maribo	54°46′14.33″N 11°29′29.11″E	Pavilion (Gammel Skovnæs Dairy) from 1853
Christianssæde		Kristianssædevej 3, 4930 Maribo	54°45′28.73″N 11°21′14.03″E	Main building from 1690 which was probably adapted in c. 1740 and again in 1878-84 and rebuilt after a fire in 1986
Kapellanstræde 6		Kapellanstræde 6, 4930 Maribo	54°46′22.94″N 11°30′6.49″E	Townhouse from 1756
Kapellanstræde 8		Kapellanstræde 8, 4930 Maribo	54°46′22.72″N 11°30′6.56″E	Townhouse from 1756
Kapellanstræde 10		Kapellanstræde 10, 4930 Maribo	54°46′22.48″N 11°30′6.63″E	Townhouse from 1756
Kapellanstræde 12		Kapellanstræde 12, 4930 Maribo	54°46′22.21″N 11°30′6.68″E	Townhouse from 1756
Nørregades Bomhus, Maribo		Nørregade 17, 4930 Maribo	54°46′33.43″N 11°29′59.96″E	Townhouse from 1756
Qvades Gård		Torvet 3, 4930 Maribo	54°46′28.63″N 11°30′5.41″E	Main building from 1819
Qvades Gård		Torvet 3, 4930 Maribo	54°46′28.63″N 11°30′5.41″E	Galf-timbered side wing
Qvades Gård		Jernbanegade 7, 4930 Maribo	54°46′31.5″N 11°30′5.41″E	Warehouse from 1852
Søholt. Skelsnæspavillon		Søholtvej 28, 4930 Maribo	54°44′56.48″N 11°33′12.57″E	Townhouse from 1756
Torvet 24, Maribo		Torvet 24, 4930 Maribo	54°46′24.12″N 11°30′6.15″E	Townhouse from 1756
Torvet 24, Maribo		Kapellanstræde 2, 4930 Maribo	54°46′23.55″N 11°30′6.15″E	Townhouse from 1756

=== 4941 Bandholm ===
Listing name	Image	Location	Coordinates	Sescription
Bandholm railway station		Stationsvej 10, 4941 Bandholm	54°50′8.65″N 11°28′55.5″E	Station building from 1869-70
Birketvej 64-66		Birketvej 64, 4941 Bandholm	54°50′9.8″N 11°28′30.48″E	16 bays long and six bays wide half-timbered building from the middle of the 18th century and the hedging along Birketvej and Smedestræde
Hvedemagasinet, Bandholm		Havnegade 23, 4941 Bandholm	54°50′6.19″N 11°29′2.39″E	Two-storey storage building from the middle of the 19th century

=== 4812 Harpelund ===
Listing name	Image	Location	Coordinates	Sescription
Frederiksdal		Frederiksdalsvej 30, 4912 Harpelunde		
Frederiksdal		Frederiksdalsvej 30, 4912 Harpelunde		

=== 4920 Søllested ===
Listing name	Image	Location	Coordinates	Sescription
Ålstrup		Rødbyvej 45, 4920 Søllested	54°46′11.03″N 11°18′7.85″E	Half-timbered building from c. 1780

=== 4943 Torrig L ===
Listing name	Image	Location	Coordinates	Sescription
Magletving Møllevej 23		Mageltving Møllevej 23, 4943 Torrig L		
Magletving Møllevej 23		Mageltving Møllevej 23, 4943 Torrig L		
Pederstrup		Pederstrupvej 124, 4943 Torrig L	54°53′45.34″N 11°15′55.85″E	Neoclassical manor house from 1813-22 by Christian Frederik Hansen

=== 4944 Fejø ===
Listing name	Image	Location	Coordinates	Sescription
Herredsvej 281		Herredsvej 281, 4944 Fejø	54°57′5.53″N 11°25′59.98″E	Half-timbered building from c. 1780

=== 4951 Nørreballe ===
Listing name	Image	Location	Coordinates	Sescription
Østofte Mølle		Østofte Møllevej 262, 4951 Nørreballe		
Østofte Rectory		Østofte Gade 36, 4951 Nørreballe		
Østofte Rectory		Østofte Gade 36, 4951 Nørreballe		
Østofte Rectory		Østofte Gade 36, 4951 Nørreballe		

=== 4953 Vesterborg ===
Listing name	Image	Location	Coordinates	Sescription
Søgaard		Søvej 4, 4953 Vesterborg		
Søgaard		Søvej 4, 4953 Vesterborg		

=== 4960 Holeby ===
Listing name	Image	Location	Coordinates	Sescription
Kapellanboligen		Kirkevej 4, 4960 Holeby		
Kapellanboligen		Kirkevej 4, 4960 Holeby		
Kærstrup		Kærstrupvej 17, 4960 Holeby	54°41′33.2″N 11°31′36.49″E	Main building from 1765 /older cellar) which was adapted in 1836 and tower from 1868

=== 4970 Rødby ===
Listing name	Image	Location	Coordinates	Description
Højbygård		Højbygårdvej 20A, 4970 Rødby		
Højbygård		Højbygårdvej 20A, 4970 Rødby		
Højbygård		Højbygårdvej 20A, 4970 Rødby		
Højbygård		Højbygårdvej 20A, 4970 Rødby		
Højbygårds Skovløberhus		Højbygårdvej 22, 4970 Rødby	54°41′28.07″N 11°27′3.7″E	Residential building from c. 1850
Lungholm		Rødbyvej 22, 4970 Rødby		
Lungholm		Rødbyvej 24, 4970 Rødby		
Østergade 65, Rødby		Østergade 65, 4970 Rødby		
Tågerup Polakkaserne		Højbygårdvej 34, 4970 Rødby		
Willer House		Vestergade 1, 4970 Rødby	54°41′43.6″N 11°23′14.9″E	House from 1729

== Delisted buildings ==
Listing name	Image	Location	Coordinates	Description
Sæbyholm		Maribovej 238, 4900 Nakskov	54°50′3.25″N 11°11′30.09″E	Townhouse from 1756
Sæbyholm		Maribovej 238, 4900 Nakskov	54°50′3.25″N 11°11′30.09″E	Townhouse from 1756
Søndergades Bomhus, Maribo		Søndergade 38, 4930 Maribo	54°46′20.05″N 11°30′12.11″E	Boom house from 1820-21
