= Royal Pawn (Denmark) =

Pawnbroking establishment in Copenhagen, Denmark

- Det Kongelige Assistenshus
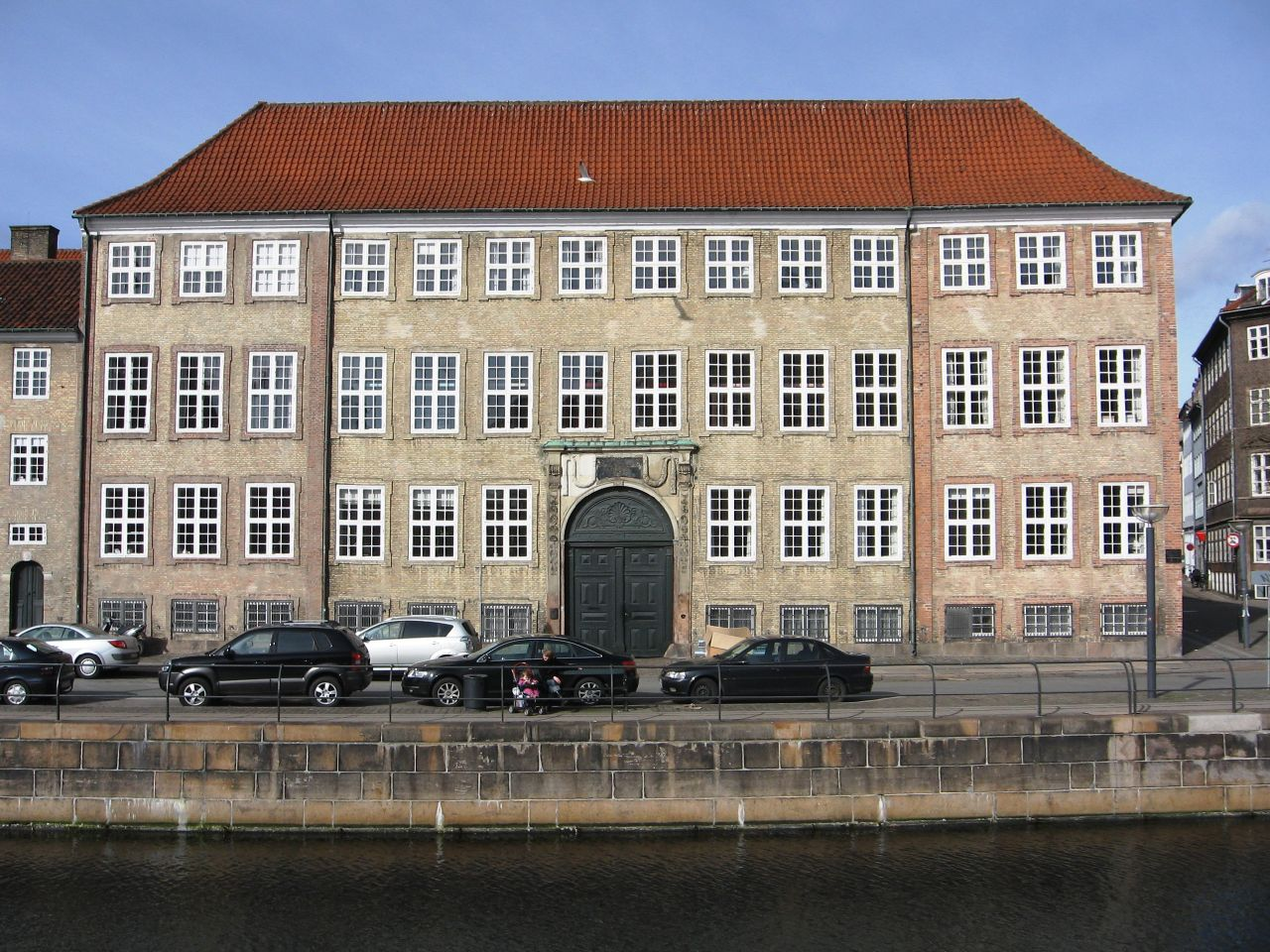
- Assistenshuset viewed from Slotsholmen
- Interactive map of the Royal Pawn area

General information
- Architectural style: Baroque
- Location: Copenhagen, Denmark
- Coordinates: 55°40′37.96″N 12°34′37.44″E
- Current tenants: Ministry of Culture
- Construction started: 1729
- Completed: 1765
- Owner: Danish state

Design and construction
- Architect: Philip de Lange

The Royal Pawn (Danish: Det Kongelige Assistenshus) was a pawnbroking establishment which existed from 1688 to 1975 in Copenhagen, Denmark. It was created at private initiative but was taken over by the state in 1758. Its former building at Nybrogade 2 was expanded by Philip de Lange in 1762. It is now home to the Ministry of Culture. The building was listed on the Danish registry of protected buildings and places in 1918.

== History ==
=== Early history ===
Assistenshuset was created at the initiative of the merchant Nicolai Wesling. He applied to the Danish Chancellery for a royal privilege to operate a pawnbroking establishment with inspiration from abroad. On 3 August 1688, Christian V issued a royal ordinance for the establishment of an "Assistance House". Wesling's pawn shop was located in a building at the corner of Nyhavn and Kvæsthusgade. He died in November 1698. His widow, Maren Iversdatter, received permission to continue the operations on 31 January 1698 but died just a few months later.

The license was then passed on to Diderik Frandsen Klevenow who moved the pawn shop to a property in Frederiksborggade. In 1699, it was decided that part of the profits should be allocated to Børnehuset and the city's poorhouses. When Klenenows died on 1 June 1711, the license was taken over by the German nobleman Johan Otto Raben and his wife Emerentzia von Levetzau, who had been his partners and wanted to secure their investment. They moved the pawn shop to Amagertorv 49 (now Amagertorv 25/Læderstræde 28) where it was managed by Jacob Lindemann.

Raben died in 1719 and his widow then operated the pawn shop alone until the license was passed on to their son Christian Frederik Raben and his wife Birthe von Plessen in 1731. In 1737, Iver Jentoft took over the license only to pass it on to two Jewish brothers from Altona, Salomon and Meyer Joseph Unna, who moved the pawn shop to a no longer existing building at present day No. 12 in Snaregade. The establishment was declared bankrupt in 1749 with 150,000 Danish rigsdaler in debts.

=== The royal pawnbroking establishment ===
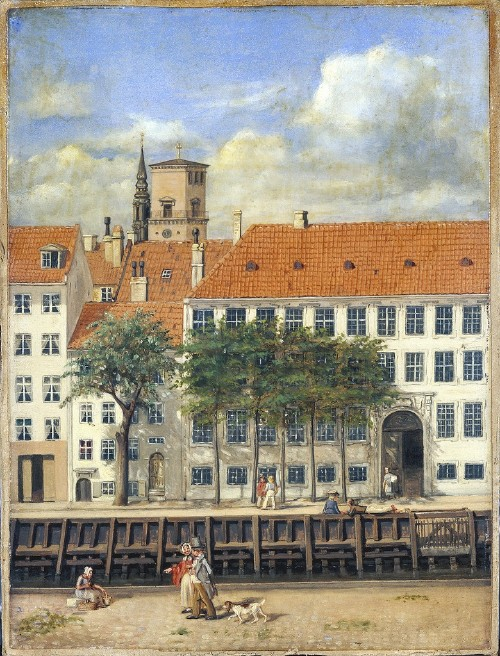
The Royal Pawn (right) and Pæretræet in 1840

After a turbulent period with several competing applicants, the license was taken over by director of Søkvæsthuset and councilman Steffen Heger and merchant Diderich Munch and Assistenshuset was converted into a state-run establishment under Søkvæsthuset by royal ordinance of 29 June 1753 (Forordning om Assistantz-Huuset i Kiøbenhavn 29. juni 1753). It was now moved to a building at the corner of Store Færgestræde (now Højbro Plads) and Store Kirkestræde. The opening hours were eight to 12 am and 14 to 19 p, pm Sundays in the summer time and nine to 13 and 14 to 16 pm in the winter time. The new manager was Jens Hansen Løwe who had also worked for the old pawn shop.

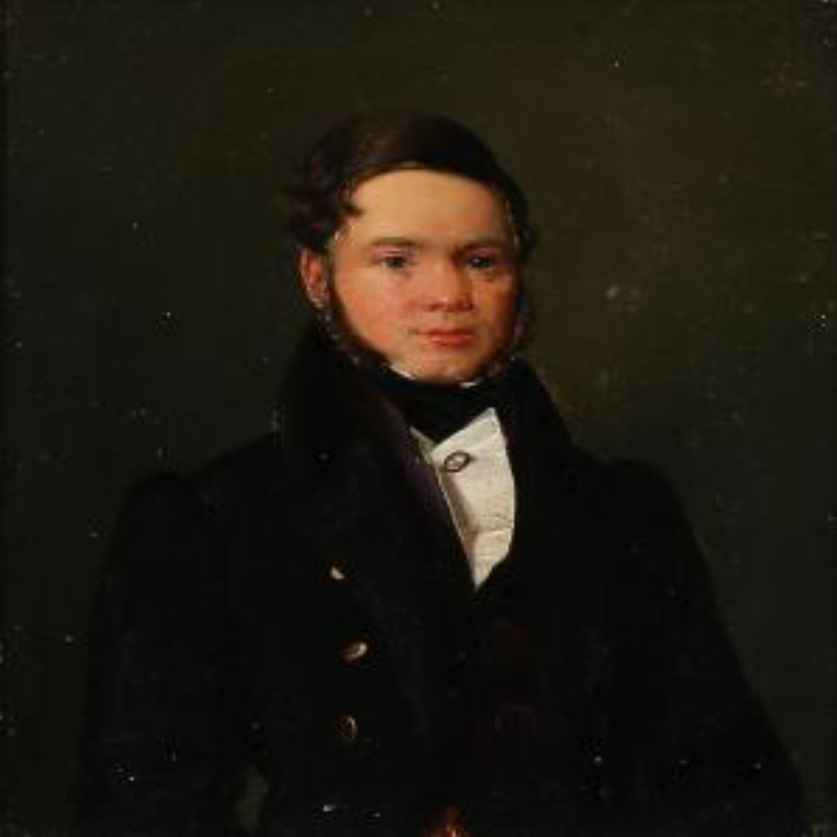
Louis Aumont: Pawn House manager Holm

In 1758, Assistenshuset moved to a three-winged building at the corner of Nybrogade, Manoløs and Snaregade. It had been constructed for burgermaster Christian Berregård in 1730-32 after his house at the site had been destroyed in the Copenhagen Fire of 1729. His son sold the property to Adrian Kiøbke in 1754. In 1755, it had been acquired by two French hatters, Jean Jaques Douihac and Jaques Cuny, who had used it for manufacture and sale of hats.

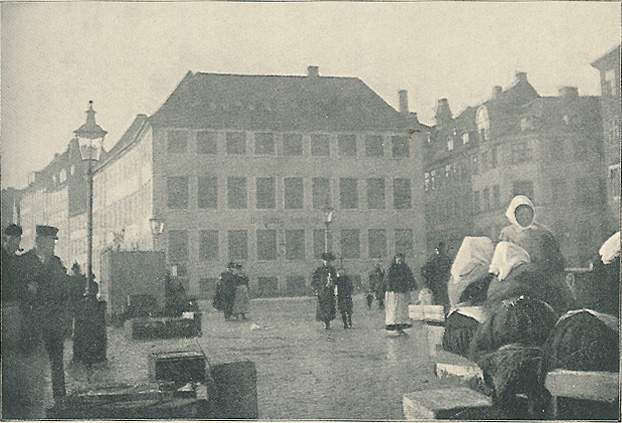
The Royal Pawn viewed from Gammel Strand in 1907

In 1765, Assistenshuset commissioned Philip de Lange to expand the complex with a new wing on Nybrogade. The neighbouring building, known as Pæretræet, was acquired by the institution in 1792. It was used as residence for its director.

In the 1850s and 1860s, Assistenshuset was subject to public criticism and several participants in the public debate argued in favour of a liberalization of the pawnbroking market. The institution was separated from Søkvæsthuet in 1860 and the regulation was revised several times.

=== Late years and closure ===
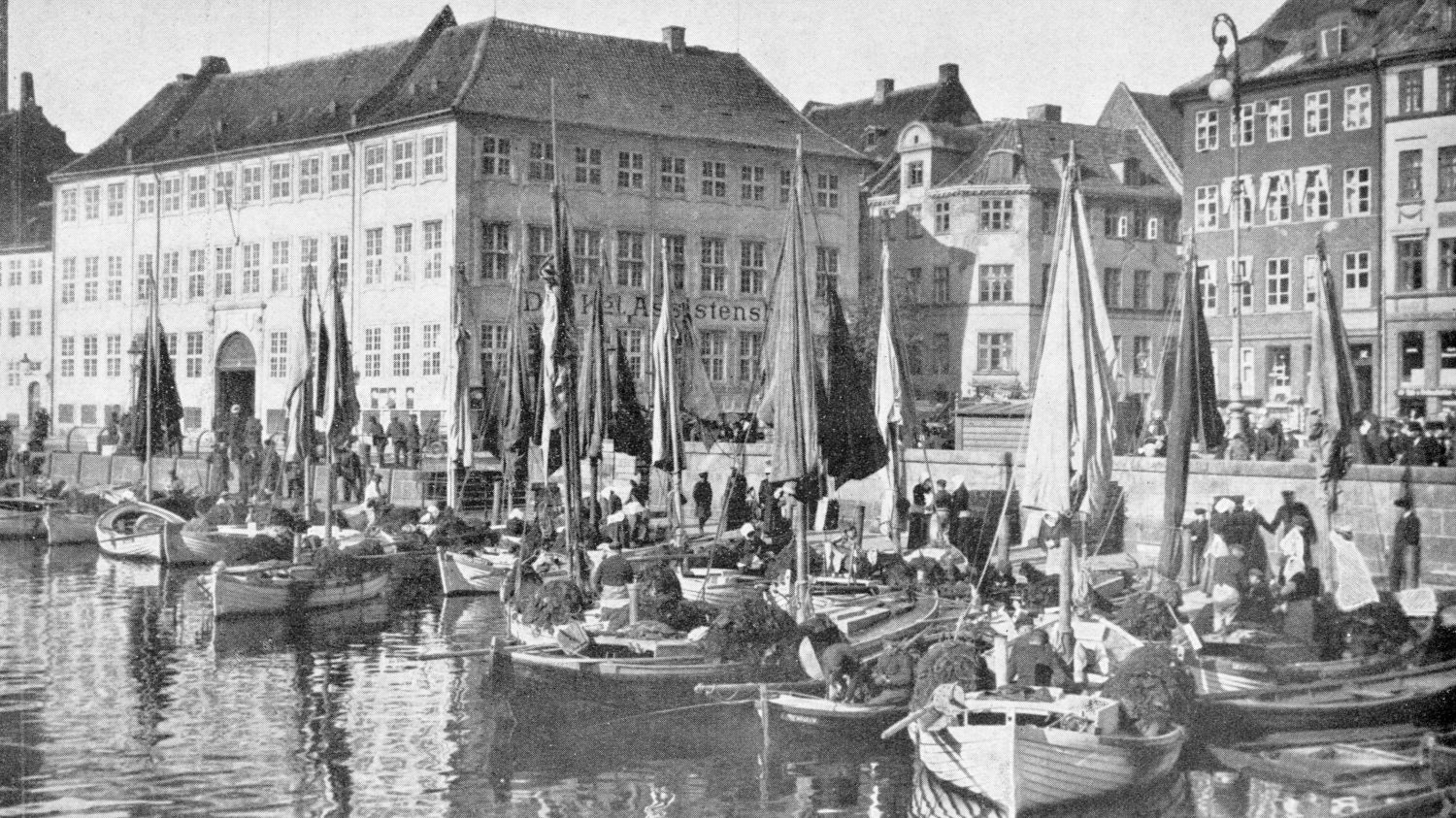
The Total Pawn viewed from Gammel Strand in 1907

In 1935, Assistenshuset achieved a de facto monopoly on pawnbroking. In 1961, Assistenshuset's head office moved to Svanevej in Nørrebro and its nine branch offices closed. Assistenshuset closed in 1975.

== The building today ==
Assistenshuset's former building at Nybrogade was taken over by the Ministry of Culture in 1962.

== Cultural references ==
- Anne Marie Løn's 2008 novel Sekstetten is based on an episode in the 1920s when Assistenshuset was subject to fraud from six trusted employees.
- On 29 April 1938, Politiken published a poem by Tom Kristensen about the institution to mark its 250 years anniversary.
