= Krystalgade 3 =

Building in Copenhagen

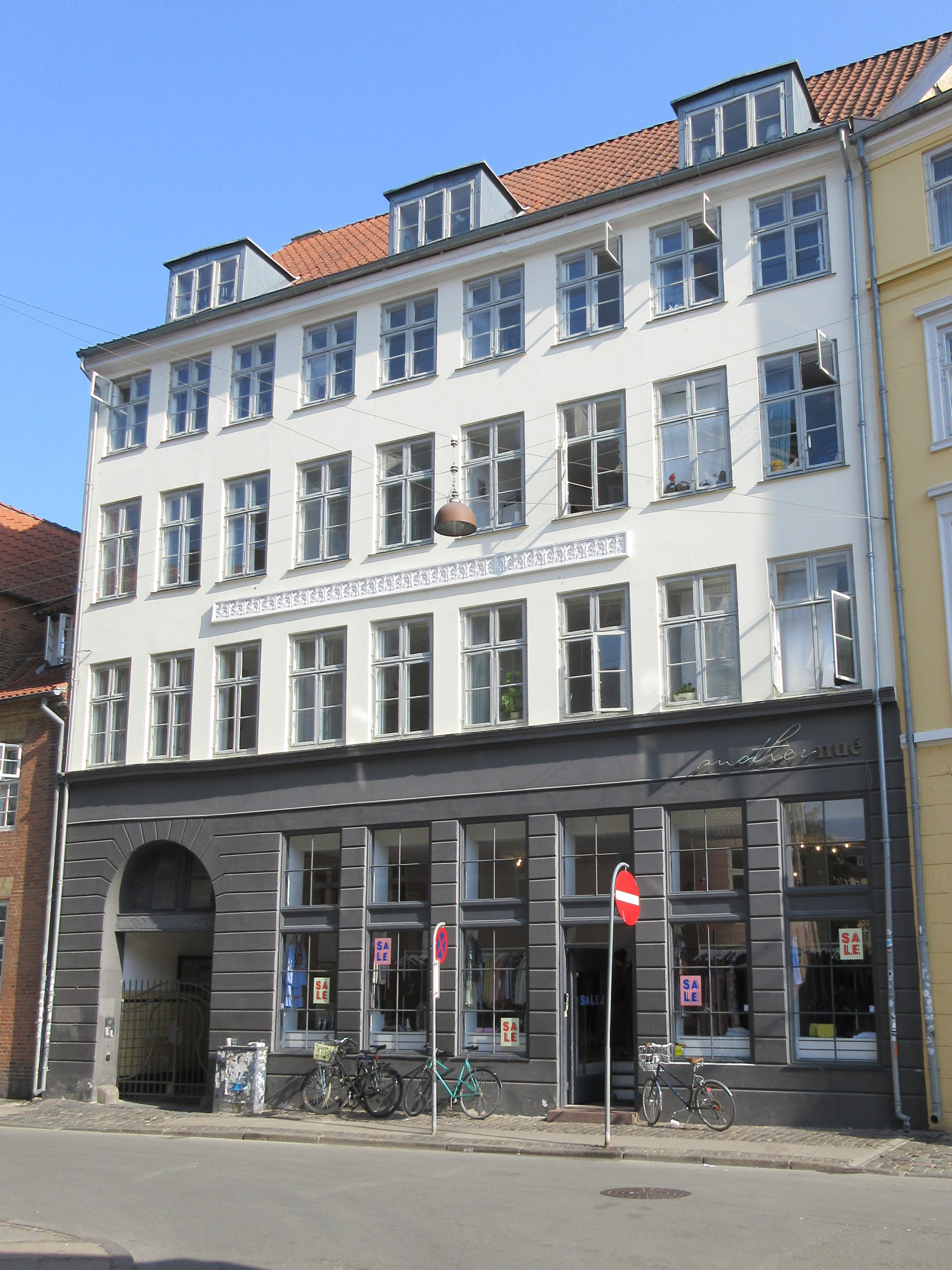
- Interactive map of the Krystalgade 3 area

General information
- Architectural style: Neoclassical
- Location: Copenhagen, Denmark
- Coordinates: 55°40′51.92″N 12°34′28.27″E
- Construction started: 1809

Krystalgade 3 is a Neoclassical property in the Old Town of Copenhagen, Denmark. It was listed in the Danish registry of protected buildings and places in 1986. Notable former residents include the book dealer Salomon Soldin, jurist J. Krag Høst (1772–1844) and writer Adolph von der Recke (1820–1867).

== History ==
=== 17th century ===
The site was formerly part of a larger property. It was listed in Copenhagen's first cadastre from 1689 as No. 43 in Klædebo Quarter, owned by former Vice-Chancellor Holger Vind's widow Margrethe Vind, née Giedde (died 18 January 1706). She was the daughter of Admiral Ove Giedde.

=== 18th century ===
The property was listed in the new cadastre of 1756 as No. 175 in Klædebo Quarter, owned by former president of the Supreme Court Didrik Seckman's widow, Hedvig Susanne Bornemann (1686–1758). The buildings were destroyed in the Copenhagen Fire of 1795.

=== 19th century ===
The property was listed in the new cadastre of 1806 as No. 50 in Klædebo Quarter. It was owned by Christian Frederik Wøhler at that time. The present building was constructed in 1808-1809 for painter (skildrer) Chr. Fr. Wohlert.

The book dealer Salomon Soldin (1774–1837) was a resident in the building in 1811. He had until then lived in his brother Abraham Soldin's house at Fortunstræde 1. He only lived in the building for around a year before continuing to Nybrogade 6. J. Krag Høst (1772–1844), a jurist, resided in the building from 1818 to 1820. The printmaker S. H. Petersen (1788–1860) was among the residents from 1846 to 1850.

The property was home to a total of 44 residents at the 1860 census. Most of the residents were craftsmen and their respective families. They included a wainwright/wheelmaker, a master saddler, a master shoemaker, a master tailor and a joiner.

== Architecture ==
Krystalgade is in four storeys. It has a trapezoidal floor plan as a result of its location where Krystalgade changfes direction. The building is towards the street and yard constructed in brick while the two gables are constructed with timber framing. The front side has rusticated finishing in a dark grey colour on the ground floor while the three upper floors are rendered white. A palmette frieze is seen between the five central windows on the first and second storeys. The pitched roof is clad in red tiles and features three dormer windows on both sides.The building was listed in the Danish registry of protected buildings and places in 1986.

A parallel rear wing of approximately the same height and width is situated on the other side of a small courtyard. The two buildings are connected via a one-storey, perpendicular side wing in the east. These buildings are not part of the heritage listing.

== Today ==
The building is today owned by Saxkjærs A/S. It contains a retail space in the ground floor and two apartments on each of the upper floors.
