= Buurmester House =

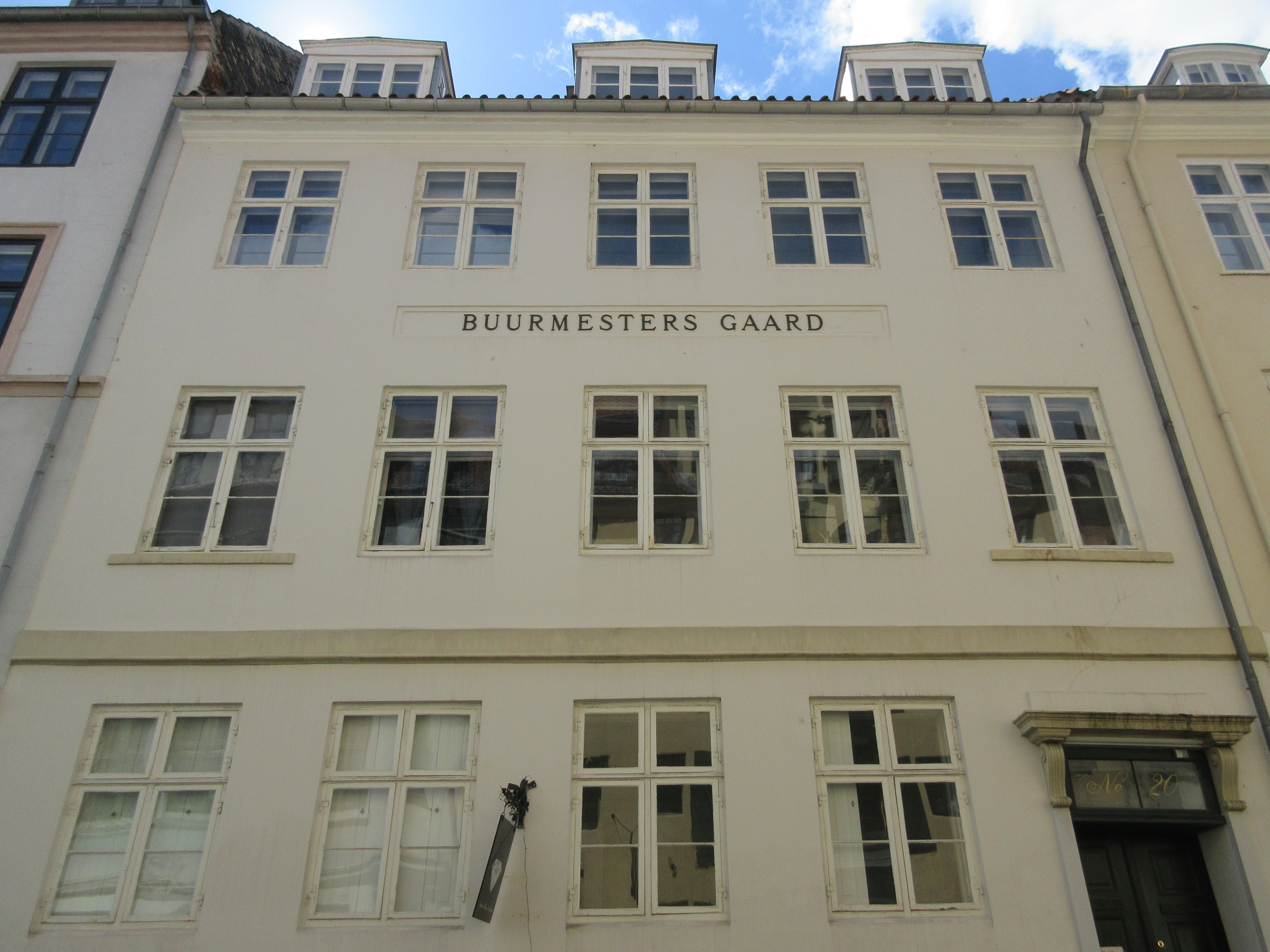
- Interactive map of the Buurmester House area

General information
- Architectural style: Neoclassical
- Location: Copenhagen, Denmark
- Coordinates: 55°40′40.66″N 12°34′54.16″E
- Completed: 1798

Design and construction
- Architect: Rrnst Burmeister

The Buurmester House (Danish: Buurmesters Gaard) is a Neoclassical property situated at Admiralgade 20 in central Copenhagen, Denmark. It is one of several buildings constructed by Ernst Burmeister as part of the rebuilding of the city following the Copenhagen Fire of 1795. It was listed in the Danish registry of protected buildings and places in 1959.

== History ==
=== 18th century ===
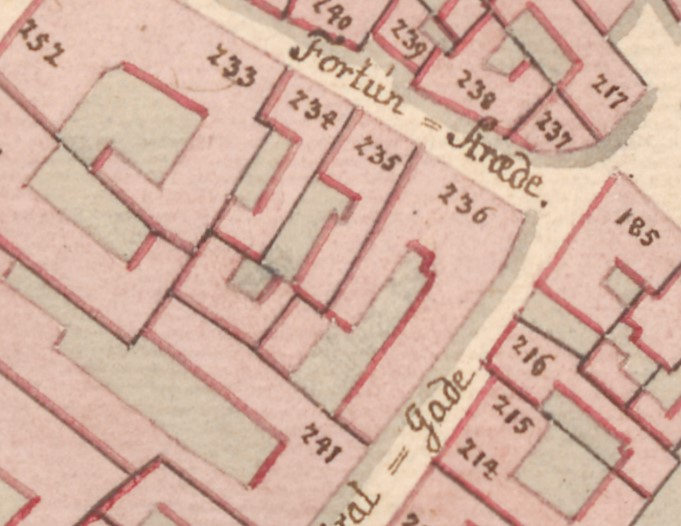
No. 236 seen in a detail from Christian Gedde's map of the East Quarter, 1757

The site was in 1689 part of a larger property (then No. 201) owned by former president of Borgerretten (The Civic Court) Hans Hiort's widow. In 1756, it was as No. 236 jointly owned by wine merchant Hans Christian Reimer and former colonial governor of the Danish Gold Coast Just Platfues.

The property was together with most of the other buildings in the area destroyed in the Copenhagen Fire of 1795. The large fire site was subsequently divided into two separate properties and sold to different buyers. The larger corner property at the corner of Fortunstræde was as No. 236A sold to master carpenter Johan Christopher Suhr (now Fortunstræde 1). The smaller property in Admiralgade was as No. 236A acquired by master carpenter Ernst Burmeister. The present building on the site was constructed by him in 1797–1798. He had in 1807 also constructed the more humble building around the corner at Fortunstræde 3.

=== 19th century ===
The property in Admiralgade was listed in the new cadastre of 1806 as No. 161. It was by owned by a woman (probably a widow) named Liunge (Ljunge, Lunge) at that time.

The actor Johan Christian Ryge (1780-1842) was among the residents from 1817 to 1821.

No. 161 was home to 22 residents in four households at the 1860 census. Marie Ølsted Sørensen, a coffee retailer (widow), resided in the building with her 21-year-old foster daughter and one maid. Christen Nielsen, a fireman in the Ministry of Naval Affairs, resided in the building with his wife Gjertrud Larsen, their four children (aged two to 10) and one maid. Joseph Levia Samson, a silk and textile merchant, resided in the building with his wife Emilie Samson, their two children (aged 12 and 13) and one maid. Frederikke Levin. a widow, resided in the building with four unmarried daughters (all of whom were teachers) and two lodgers.

== Architecture ==
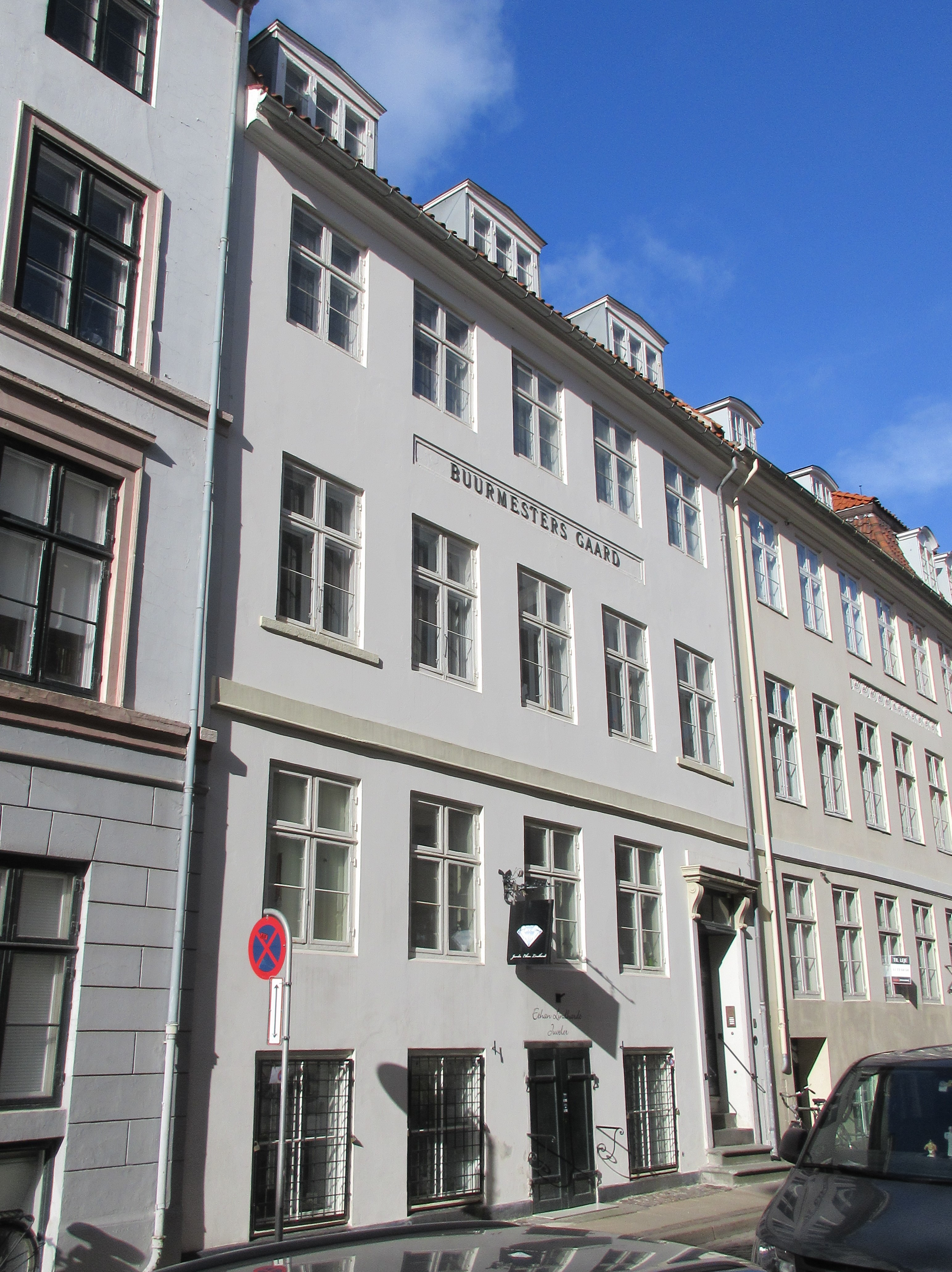
Admiralgade 20

Admiralgade 20 is constructed in brick with three storeys over a walk-out basement. The front is plastered and white-painted. It is finished by a yellow-painted belt course above the ground floor and a white-painted cornice under the roof. An inset band between the three central windows on the first and second floors, which originally featured a frieze similar to the ones seen on many of the surrounding buildings, is now inscribed with the name of the building ("Buurmesters Gaard").

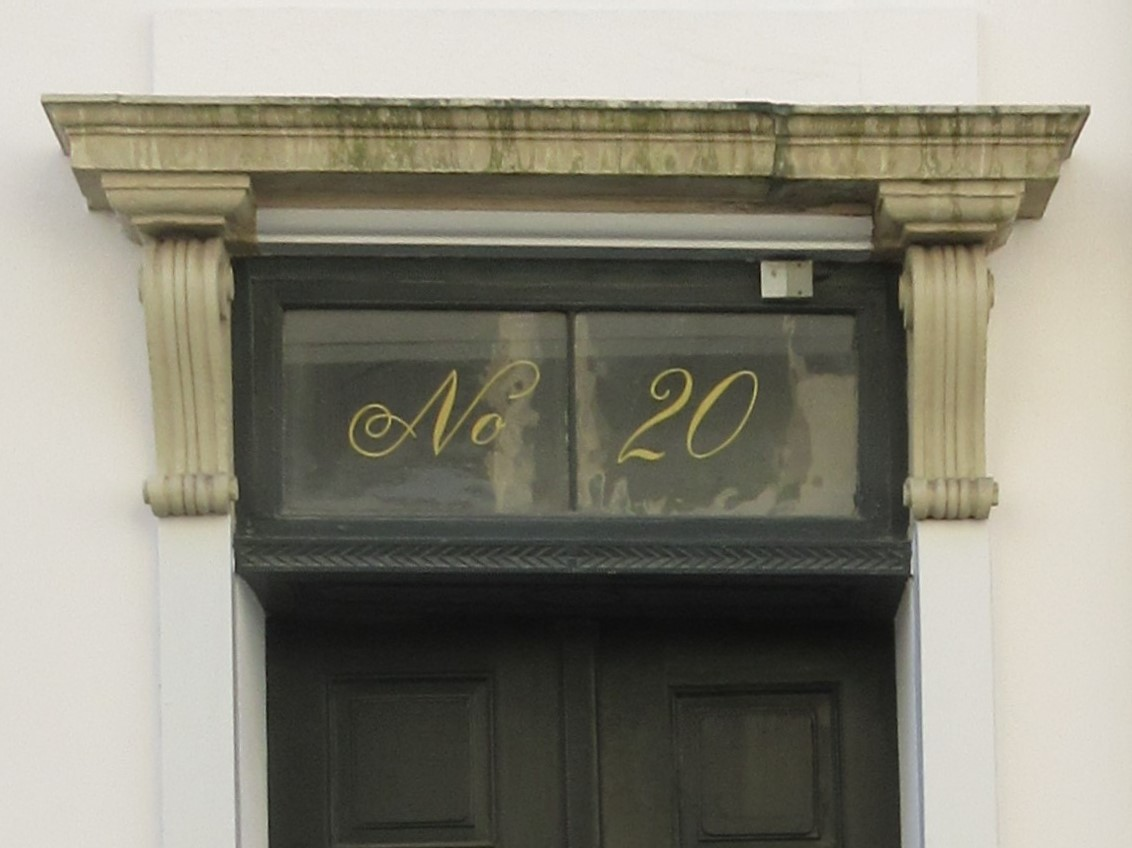
Detail of the door

The main entrance in the bay farthest to the right (north) is accessed via a steep flight of steps. The transom window features the house number. The door is topped by a hood mould supported by corbels. The basement entrance in the central bay was until 1870 also topped by a hood mould.

The building is via two diagonal bays attached to a narrow, parallel rear wing on the other side of an equally narrow courtyard. The courtyard is to the north bordered by Fortunstræde 1. The entire complex was listed on the Danish registry of protected buildings and places in 1945.

== Today ==
The building was as of 2008 owned by Trekantområdets Ejendomsselskab. The basement contains a retail space.
