= Nybrogade 6 =

Listed building in Copenhagen

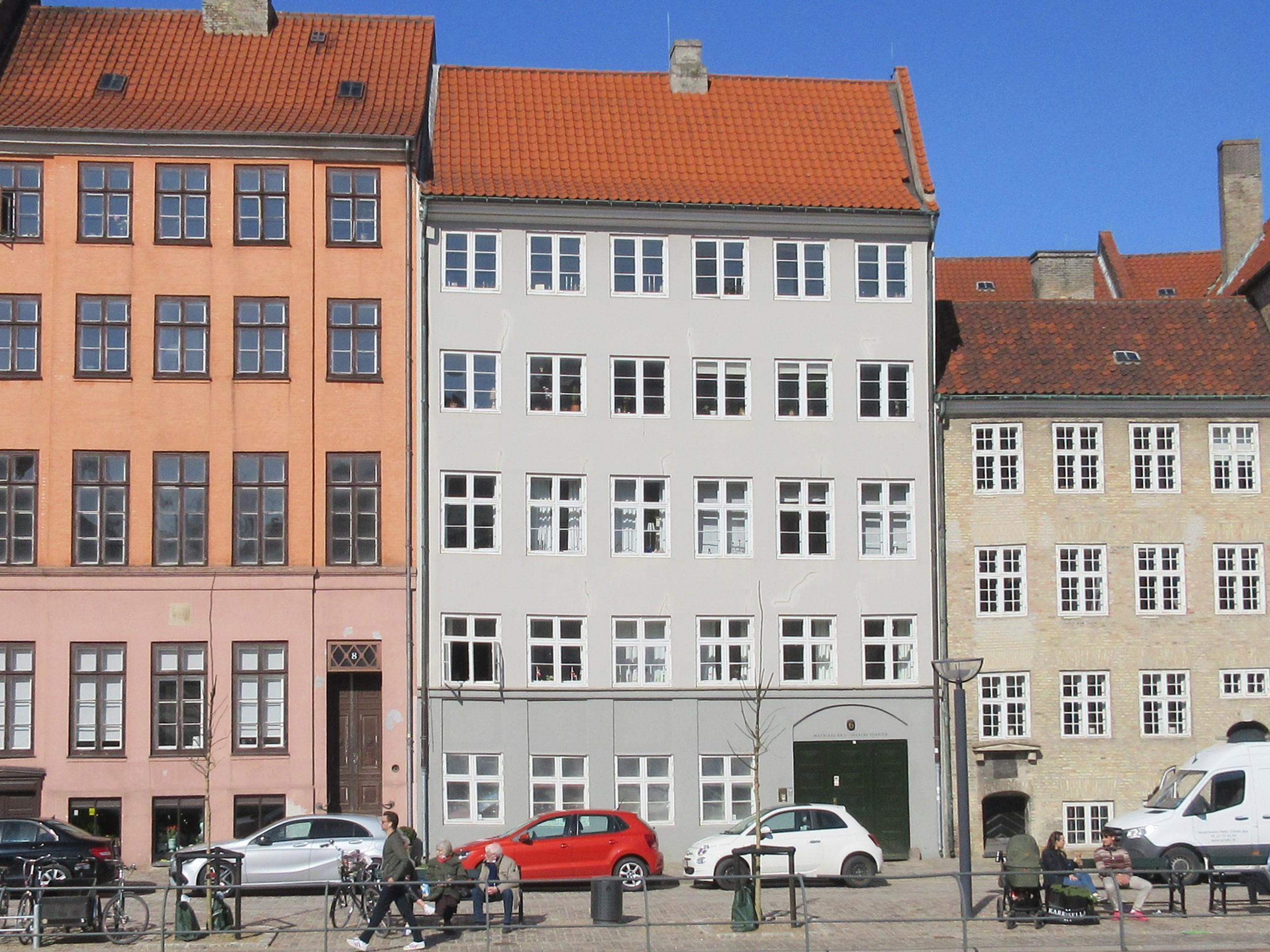
- Interactive map of the Nybrogade 6 area

General information
- Location: Copenhagen, Denmark, Denmark
- Coordinates: 55°40′36.73″N 12°34′36.7″E
- Completed: 1762–1784 (Nybrogade 6), 1733 (Snaregade 3)
- Renovated: 1797, 1827, 1845

Nybrogade 6/Snaregade 3 is an 18th-century building complex overlooking the Slotsholmens Kanal in the Old Town of Copenhagen, Denmark. It consists of a five-storeys-tall and six-bays-wide building in Nybrogade (1762–1784, heightened 1797–1827) and a half-timbered rear wing in Snaregade (1733) on the other side of the block, as well as a seven-bays-long half-timbered side wing that connects them to each other along one side of a central courtyard. The three buildings were jointly listed in the Danish registry of protected buildings and places in 1945. Notable former residents include the bookseller Salomon Soldin (1774–1837), composers Andreas Peter Berggreen (1801–1880) and Volkmar Busch, and Wollert Konow. The building is today used as extra offices for the Ministry of Culture, headquartered in Assistenshuset at Nybrogade 2.

== History ==
=== 18th century ===
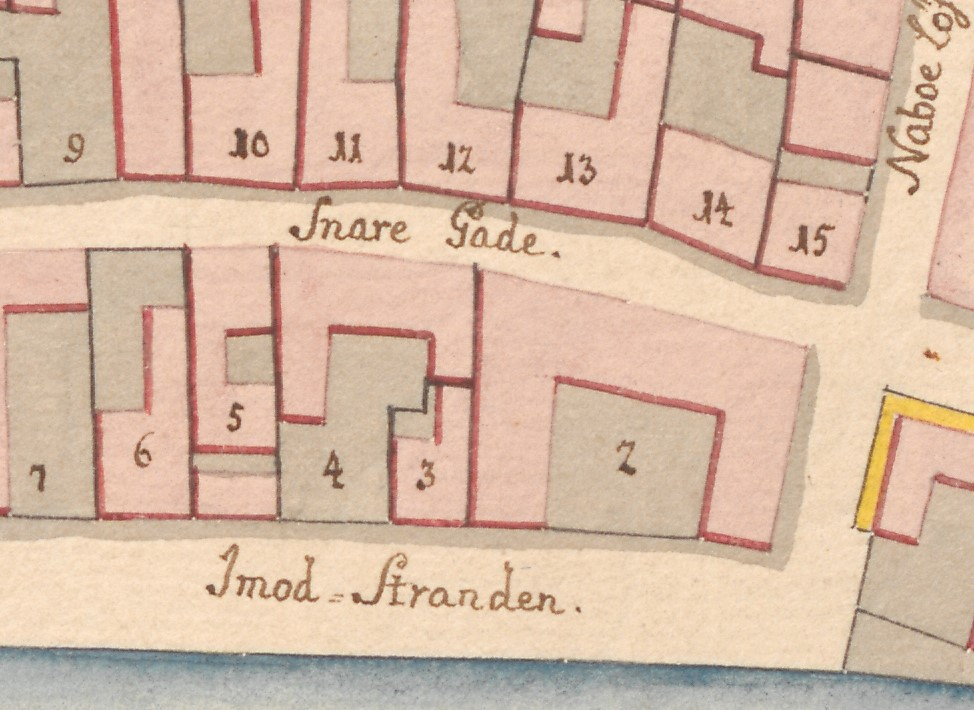
No. 4 seen in a detail from Christian Gedde's map of Snaren's Quarter, 1757

The properties now known as Nybrogade 6 and Nybrogade 4 were formerly part of the same property. This property was listed in Copenhagen's first cadastre of 1689 as No. 4 in Snaren's Quarter, owned by Morits Mandixen. The property was later divided into two separate properties. The western of these properties (now Nybrogade 6) was again listed as No. 4 in the new cadastre of 1756 and belonged to Hans Munch at that time.

The other property (No. 3, now Nybrogade 4) did not continue all the way through the block to Snaregade, leaving No. 3 as an L-shaped property (cf. the map detail from Christian Gedde's 1757 map of Snaren's Quarter). The Snaregade portion of the property was from 1833 the site of a 15-bays-long half-timbered building (shortened with six bays in 1845, cf. below). The building in Nybrogade was constructed with two storeys some time between 1762 and 1784.

The property belonged to master butcher Christen Nielsen Smidt at the time of the 1787 census. He lived there with his wife Helene Lind, their 15-year-old daughter, a 22-year-old son from his first marriage, seven butchers, five butcher's apprentices, a caretaker and three maids.

=== Christian Reinhardt Chartier ===
The property was later acquired by calico printer Christian Reinhardt Chartier (alternative spellings of his last name include Chartil and Schartie). He heightened the two-storey building in Nybrogade in 1797. His property was home to eight households at the 1801 census. Christian Reinhardt Chartier resided in the building with his wife Johanne Cathrine Rasmussen, his mother Engel Christine Chartier, his 16-year-old niece Engel Christine Lovise Chartier and one maid. Jochum Svitzer, a cooper (bødkersvend), resided in the building with his wife Margrethe Berthelsen, their five children (aged two to 13) and one maid. Karen Søsted, a widow porcelain merchant, resided in the building with her daughter Cecilia Margrethe Heegaard, one maid and two lodgers. Samson Salomon, a singer, resided in the building with his wife Ester Uri Cohn, four foster children (aged nine to 20) and two lodgers. Juliane Knag, a widow, resided in the building with her three children (aged two to 10) and one maid. Jacob Nielsen, a skipper, resided in the building with his wife Boel Andersen and their 10-year-old daughter Maren Kirstine Nielsen. Ane Schiøt, a widow waitress, resided in the building with her daughter Margrethe Schiøt. Johan Friderich Schreiber, a master shoemaker, resided in the building with his wife Dorthe Elydia, one shoemaker (employee) and one shoemaker's apprentice.

The property was listed in the new cadastre of 1806 as No. 3 in Snaren's Quarter. It was owned by textile printer Chartier at that time.

=== 1810–1850s ===
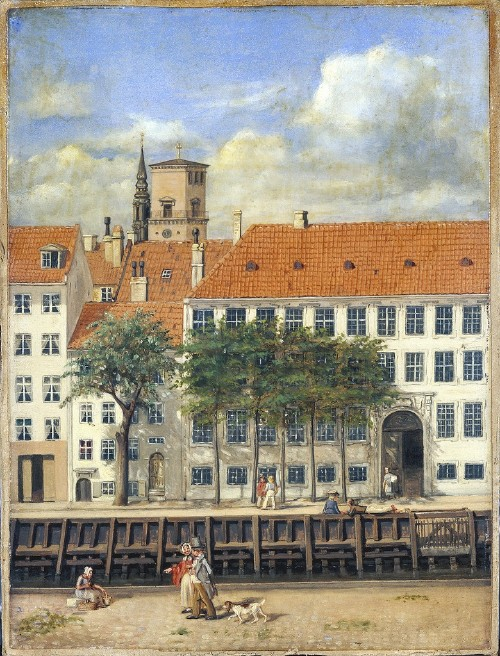
A glimpse of the western part of the building in 1840

The bookseller Salomon Soldin (1774–1837) resided in the building from 1813 to 1916. He later purchased the property at Fortunstræde 1. The composer Andreas Peter Berggreen (1801–1880) resided in the building in 1836. The building in Nybrogade was heightened with one storey in 1827.

The building was again heightened in 1827. Some sources state that it was heightened with two storeys in 1797 and that the last storey was added in 1827. Other sources state that it was heightened with one storey in 1797, 1827 and 1845. The census records from 1840 mention a fourth floor but no ground floor, leaving it open to interpretation whether it was then a four-storey building or a five-storey building with an uninhabited ground floor. An illustration of the adjacent building (Pæretræet, Nybrogade 4) from 1840 (see below) does, however, clearly show part of the building with five storeys.

The property was home to a total of 74 residents at the time of the 1840 census. Peter Ludvig Fabritius de Tengnagel (1792–1874), a book printer, resided on the first floor of the building in Nybrogade with his wife Sophie Amalie (Trolle), their four children (aged two to 16), his brother Ludvig Fabritius de Tengnagel and one maid. The eldest of the two sons was the later chamberlain and amtmand Conrad Alexander Fabritius de Tengnagel (1838–1892). Daniel Schmelling, a retired grocer (urtekræmmer), resided on the second floor with his wife Marthe Otto and two of their children (aged 27 and 29). Jens Hendricksen, a master mason, resided on the third floor with his wife Karen Marie Høffding, their three children (aged 22 to 27) and the lodger Jens Christopher von Astrup (Chancerry Secretary). Anna Schellerup (née Schram), widow of surveyor named Schellerup, resided on the fourth floor with her son Peter Schellerup and Ida Christine Schellerup. Mads Hansen Bjørn, a flour merchant, resided on the ground floor with his wife Marie Christine Tornved and his sister Stine Hansen. Lars Hansen Hjelm, a watchman associated with the Assistenshuset, resided on the ground floor of the side wing with his wife Magdalene Mortensen and their five-year-old son Johan Carl Hjelm. Peter Jensen Burup, an inspector at the Gældsarresten, resided on the first floor of the side wing with his wife Pauline Nielsen, their four children (aged one to 14) and one lodger. Hans Jonas Theden, a master shoemaker, resided on the second floor with his wife Johanne Jacobsen, their son Christian Theden, his sister Catherine Theden and the 55-year-old widow Marie Jørgensen. Benjamin Jacobsen, a butcher, resided on the same floor with his wife Mine Davisohn, their seven children (aged 13 to 20) and one maid. Hans Rasmussen, a royal coachman, resided on the ground floor of the Snaregade building with his wife Christine Hansen, their five children (aged two to 15) and two lodgers. Ole Møller, a gilder, resided on the second floor of the Snaregade building with his wife Sophie Langer, their four children (aged four to 16) and two lodgers. Johan Gotfredsen, a shoemaker, resided the same floor with his wife Christine Pedersen, their six children (aged five to 17) and one lodger. Anders Mathiasen, a master joiner, resided on the third floor with his daughter Boline Mathiasen, a joiner's apprentice and a maid. Øltapperske, a beer seller (øltapper), resided in the basement with his wife Hendes. Jens Hansen, a workman, resided in the basement with his wife Ane Hansen and five children (aged three to 15).

=== 1840 census ===
Peter Rahlff (1794–), a businessman (grosserer), resided on the ground floor with his wife Louise Netthropp, their seven children (aged three to 17), 28-year-old Caroline Nielsen and three maids. Wollert Konow, a man with means, resided on the first floor with his wife Marie Louise Oehlenschlager and two maids.

=== Government ownership ===
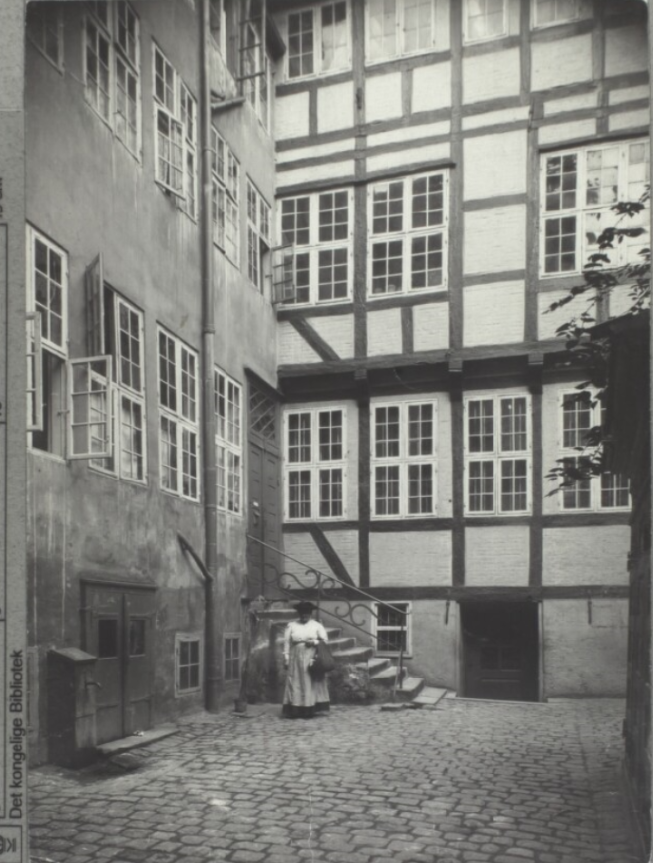
The courtyard, photographed by Kristian Hude

The property was at some point acquired by the government. It was partially used as residences available to employees at the Royal Pawn (Assistenshuset).

The property was home to 39 residents at the 1880 census. Adolph Salomon, a master painter, resided on the ground floor with his wife Emma Salomon, (née Lund), their eight children (aged one to 16) and one maid. Johan Henrik Valdemar Abel, an office manager (kontorbestyrer) at Assistenshuset, resided on the first floor with his wife Anna Katrine Abel (née Winther), their two children (aged two and three) and one maid. Marie Elisabeth Olsen (née Bøy), a widow, resided on the second floor with her sister Rebekka Frederikke Sophie Bøy and her niece Marguritte Eugenie Müller (principal of the Association of Women Teachers). Peter Nielsen, an official at Assistenshuset, resided on the third floor with his wife Mariane Nielsen (née Sengebusch), their two sons (aged 24 and 26) and the composer Volkmar Busch. Vilhelm Lejmann, a treasurer at Assistenshuset, resided on the fourth floor with his housekeeper Emma Nathalie Borchsenius. Søren Johansen, an official at the Assistenshuset, resided on the ground floor of the side wing with his wife Ane Margrethe Johansen, (née Christensen) and their two children (aged 14 and 23). Rasmus Mortensen, a courier at Assistenshuset, resided on the second floor of the side wing with his wife Bertha Mortensen (née Petersen) and their two daughters (aged 24 and 25). Laura Charlotte Skou (mée Nielsen), a widow, resided on the second floor of the rear wing with her two sons (aged 20 and 26), her brother Richard T. Rasmussen (painter/artist) and her nephew Almann Christian Frederik Nielsen (musician).

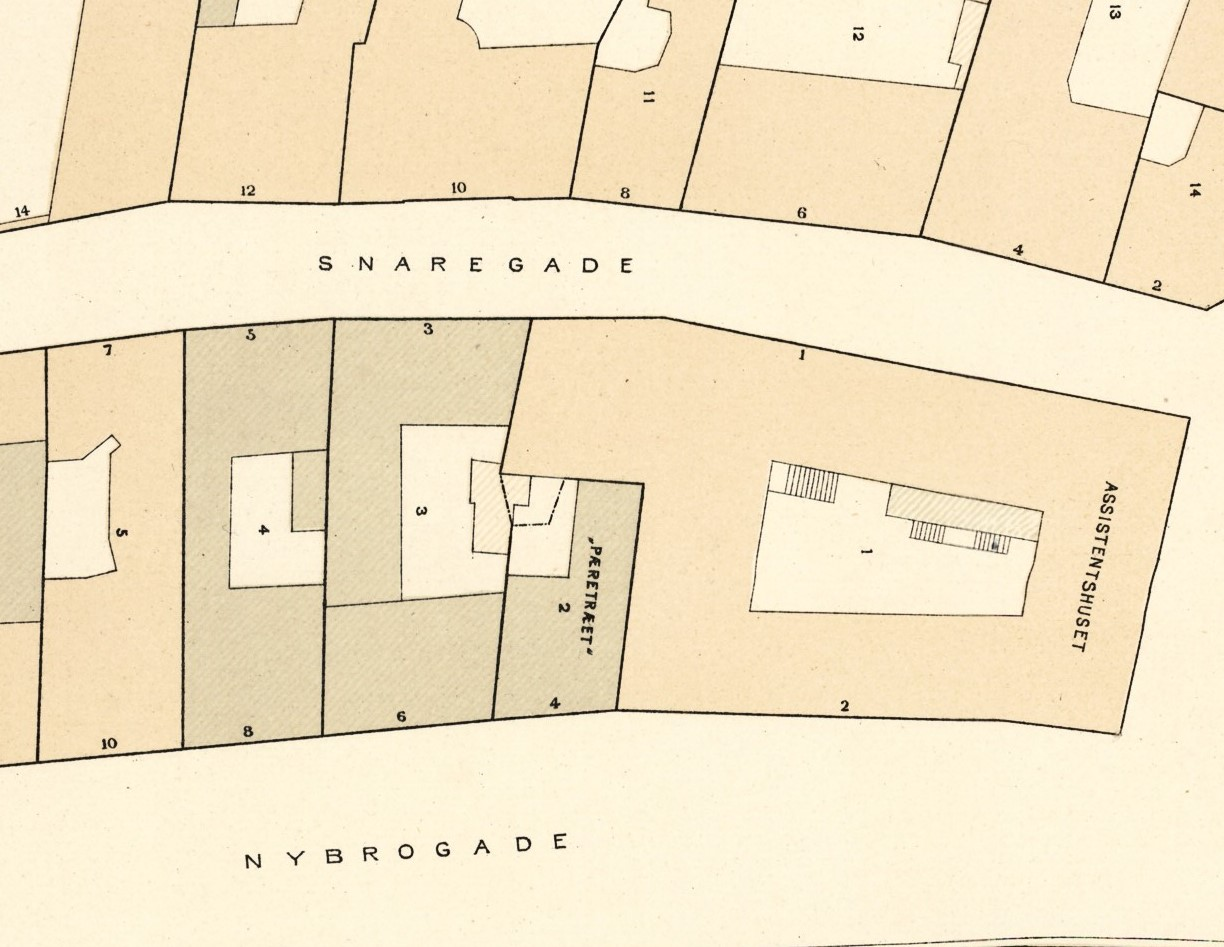
Nybrogade 6/Snaregade 3 seen on a detail from Berggreen's cadastral map of Snaren's Quarter, 1884

The property was home to 23 residents at the 1906 census. Johan Henrik Valdemar Abel, who was still employed as an office manager at Assistenshuset, was still residing on the first floor with his wife Abel Anna Cathrina and their 29-year-old son Güntelberg Aage Abel. Victor Alexander Fischer, a senior clerk (fuldmægtig) at Assistenshuset, resided on the second floor with his wife Alma Nicoline Fischer and their nine children (aged four to 20). Dagmar Sørensen, an appraiser at Assistenshuset, resided on the third floor with her daudhter and two sons. The daughter worked as a telephonist at Assistenshuset and one of the sons worked there as an assistant. The other son was a student. Carl Olsen, a caretaker (magasinbetjent) at Assistenshuset, resided on the ground floor of the side wing with his wife Dagmar Olsen and their five-year-old daughter.

== Architecture ==
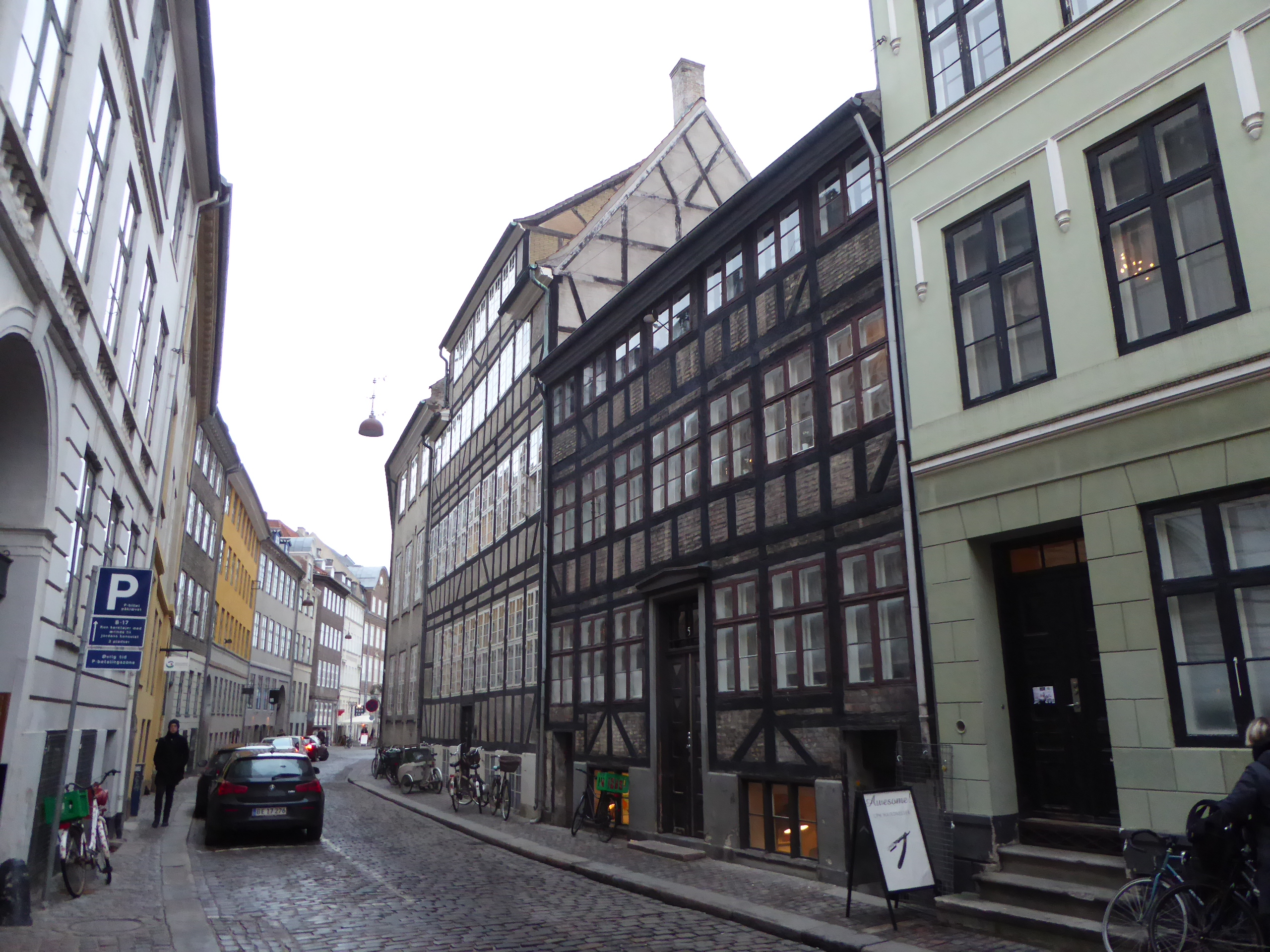
Snaregade 3 is the taller of the two half-timbered buildings. The other one is Snaregade 5.

Nybrogade 6 is a six-bays-wide, give-storey building, topped by a pitched roof clad in red tile. The roof ridge is pierced by a brick chimney. The plastered facade is finished with a belt course below the first-floor windows and a cornice below the roof. The gateway in the two bays furthest to the left is topped by a shallow arched niche with the house number.

Snaregade 3 is a nine-bays-wide, half-timbered building constructed with three storeys above a walk-out basement. It was shortened by six bays in 1845.

The side wing that connects the two building along the western side of the courtyard is a seven-bays-long half-timbered building constructed with three storeys above a walk-out basement. The facade is crowned by a gabled wall dormer.

== Today ==
The property is owned by the Agency for Culture and Palaces (Slots- og Kulturstyrelsen). It is used by the Ministry of Culture.
