= Fortunstræde 1 =

Building in Copenhagen, Denmark

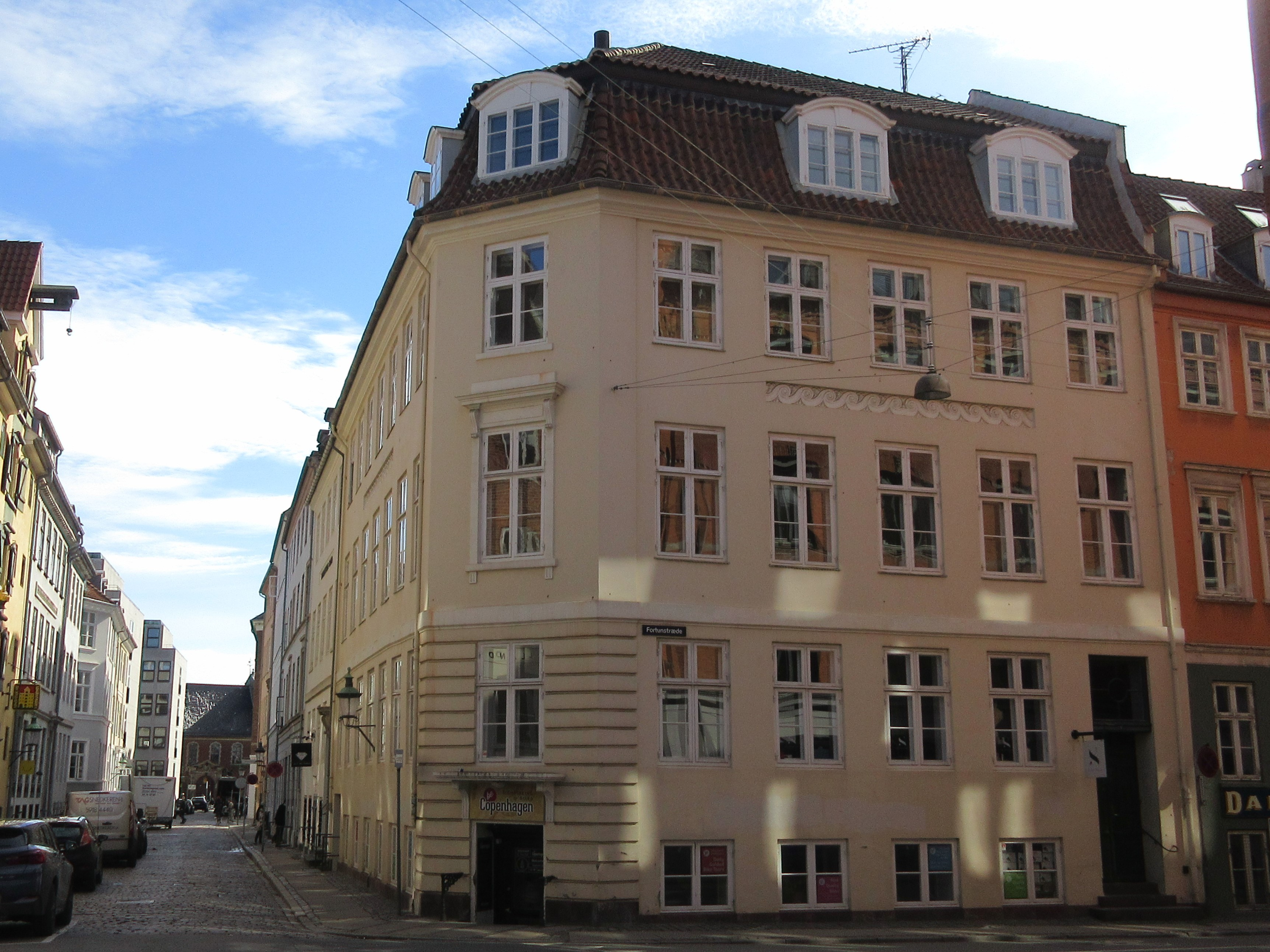
- Interactive map of the Fortunstræde 1 area

General information
- Architectural style: Neoclassical
- Location: Copenhagen, Denmark
- Coordinates: 55°40′41.12″N 12°34′53.44″E
- Completed: 1798

Fortunstræde 1 is a Neoclassical property situated at the corner of Fortunstræde and Admiralgade, opposite the former St. Nicolas' Church, now Kunsthallen Nikolaj, in central Copenhagen, Denmark. The building was like most of the other buildings in the area constructed after the Copenhagen Fire of 1795. It was shortly thereafter acquired by the bookseller Abraham Soldin who in partnership with his brother Salomon Soldin ran a bookshop and publishing business from the premises. The venture was later continued by his son Ferdinand Vilhelm Soldenfeldt as F. V. Soldenfeldt. The building is today owned by Borgervennen, a fraternal society founded in 1788, now based in the apartment on the first floor. The building was listed in the Danish registry of protected buildings and places in 1945.

== History ==
=== Early history ===
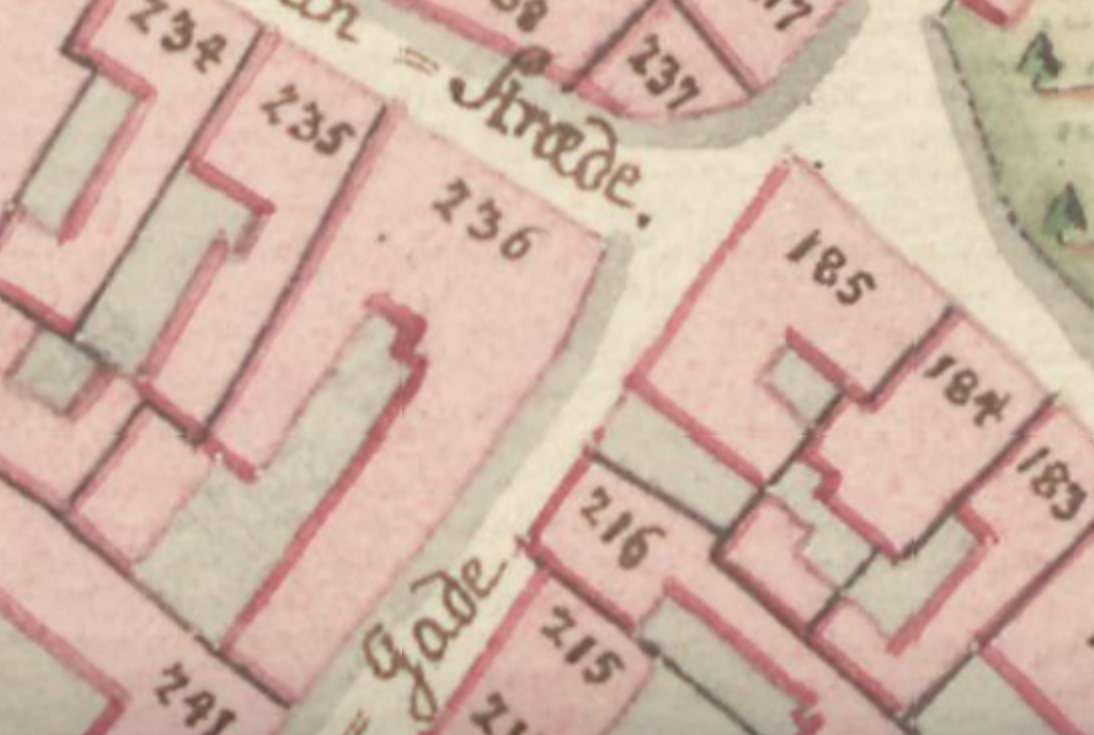
No. 236 seen on a detail from Christian Gedde's map of the East Quarter, 1757.

The property was listed in Copenhagen's first cadastre of 1689 as No. 201 in the city's East Quarter and belonged to former president of Borgerretten (The Civic Court) Hans Hiort's widow at that time. It was listed in the new cadastre of 1756 as No. 236 and was jointly owned by wine merchant Hans Christian Reimer and former colonial governor of the Danish Gold Coast Just Platfues at that time.

The property No. 236 A was at the time of the 1787 census home to a total of three households. The first household consisted of the vintner Joseph Bonfils, his wife Catharine Bonfils, their son Carl Georg and two servants. The second household consisted of Søren Høyer, his wife Margrethe Høyer and two maids. The third household consisted of host for Det Venskabelige Selskab (later Borups Selskab) Søren Ovdrup, his wife Ane Catrine, their five children and three maids.

The buildings was together with most of the other buildings in the area destroyed in the Copenhagen Fire of 1795. The large fire site was subsequently divided into two separate properties and sold to different buyers. The smaller of the two properties in Admiralgade was as No. 236A sold to Ernst Burmeister (now Admiralgade 20). The larger corner property was as No. 236A acquired by master carpenter Johan Christopher Suhr. He had served as alderman of the Carpenters' Guild from 1787 to 1791. The current building was constructed by him in 1797–98.

=== Soldin family ===
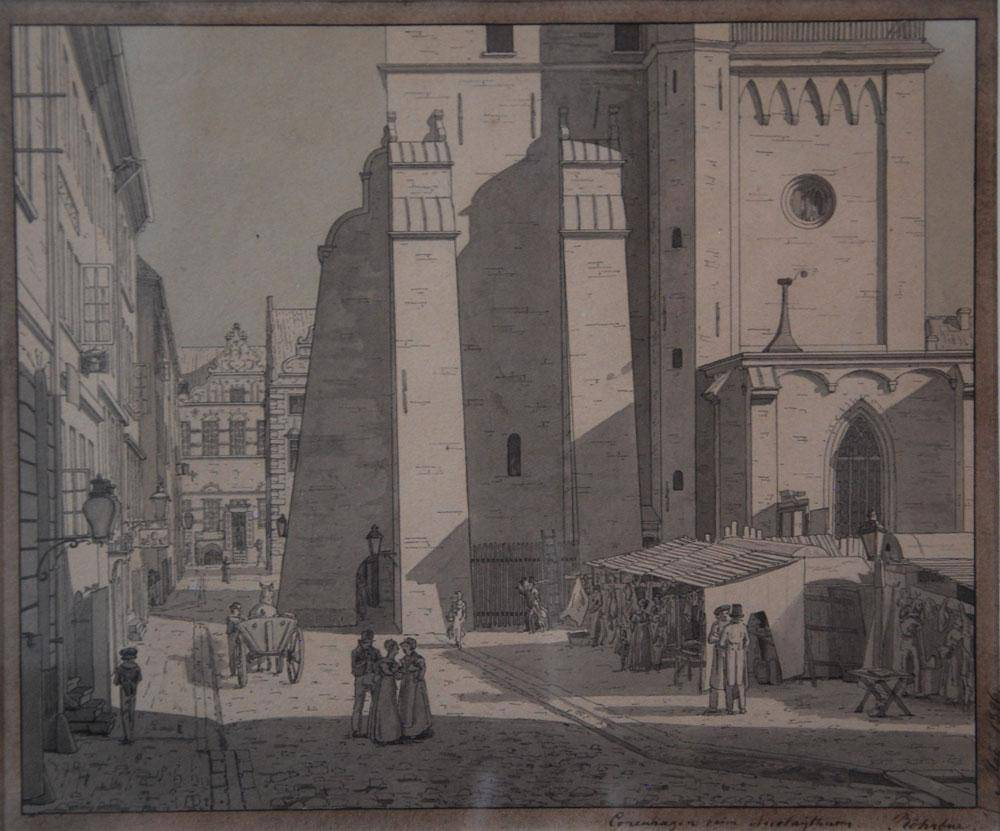
The view from the building seen on a drawing by Martinus Rørbye, 1826.

The property was in circa 1802 acquired by the Jewish bookseller Abraham Soldin (1769-1834). It was in the new cadastre of 1806 listed as No 148. Soldin and his younger brother and business partner Salomon Soldin ran a bookshop and later also a successful publishing business from the basement. Their publications included H. A. Kofod's first encyclopedia in 20 volumes (1816-), a popular series of travel books (34 volumes) and many school books. Salomon Soldin was editor of the journal Nyeste Skilderie af Kjøbenhavn from 1804 to 1825 and its publisher from 1811. He wrote many of the articles himself while other contributors included Rasmus Nyerup, Knud Lyhne Rahbek, N.F.S. Grundtvig and Christian Molbech. Salomon Soldin resided in his brother's house in Fortunstræde from 1802 to 1811. His next home was at Krystalgade 3 (then Skidenstræde 50).

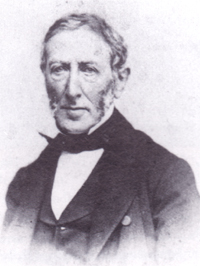
Ferdinand Vilhelm Soldenfeldt

Abraham Soldin was married to Rose Wallich (1769-1842). Two of their children converted to Christianity and assumed the name Soldenfeldt in 1820. The firm was on Abraham Soldin's death in 1834 continued by his son Ferdinand Vilhelm Soldenfeldt (1803-1881). His brother Joseph C. Soldenfeldt (1806–91) had a successful career as a civil servant before joining the brothers firm in 1859. The two brothers never married and lived together in the house at Fortunstræde for their entire lives. Their unmarried sister Henriette was at the time of the 1845 census also part of the household. The two brothers maintained a very modest lifestyle in spite of their considerable wealth. They were on the other hand known for handing alms out from their home in Fortunestræde to those in need on Friday evenings.

The publishing house was on Ferdinand Vilhelm Soldenfeldt's death in 1882 sold on auction. His brother lived in the building until his death. The brothers left their considerable wealth to charity. Soldenfeldts Stiftelse, opened in 1894.

== Architecture ==
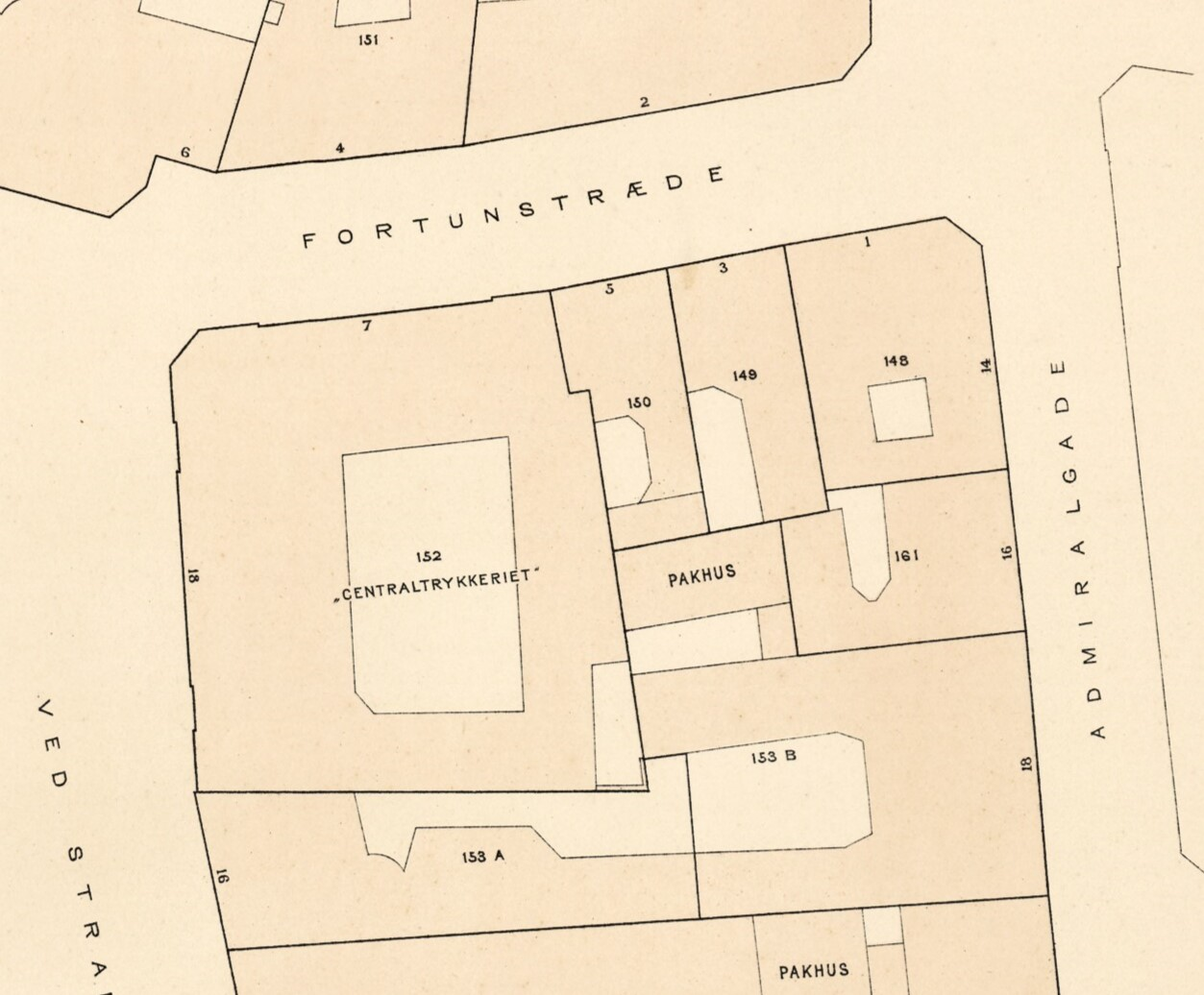
The layout of the property (upper right corner) seen on a detail from one of Berggreen's block plans of East Quarter, 1886-88.

Fortunstræde 1 is a four-winged complex, constructed with three storeys over a walk-out basementsurrounding a small quadratic courtyard. The front towards Fortunstræde is five bays long and the one towards Admiralgade is seven bays long. The chamfered corner bay was dictated for all corner buildings by Jørgen Henrich Rawert's and Peter Meyn's guidelines for the rebuilding of the city after the fire so that the fire department's long ladder companies could navigate the streets more easily. The front of the building is plastered and painted in a pale yellowish colour with white cornices and other ornamental details. The ground floor of the corner chamfer is finished with shadow joints on the ground floor. A Vitruvian scroll frieze is seen between the three central windows on the two upper floors towards both streets. The corner window on the first floor is accentuated by an ornamental sill and a hood mould, both white-painted supported by bels, below and above it. The complex is actually constructed as two individual buildings, each with a perpendicular side wing on their rear, but the uniform facade design makes this only immediately visible due to a difference in the roofs. The corner building, which comprises the three first wings towards Admiralgade, has a Mansard roof with five dormer windows towards the street. The other building, comprising the four last bays towards Admiralgade, has a pitched roof. The main entrance is situated in the bay furthest to the right (west) in Fortunstræde. The inset doorway, topped by a transom window, is raised three stone steps from street level. The basement entrance in the corner bay is topped by a hood mould. A second basement entrance is located in the bay furthest to the left (south) in Admiralgade.

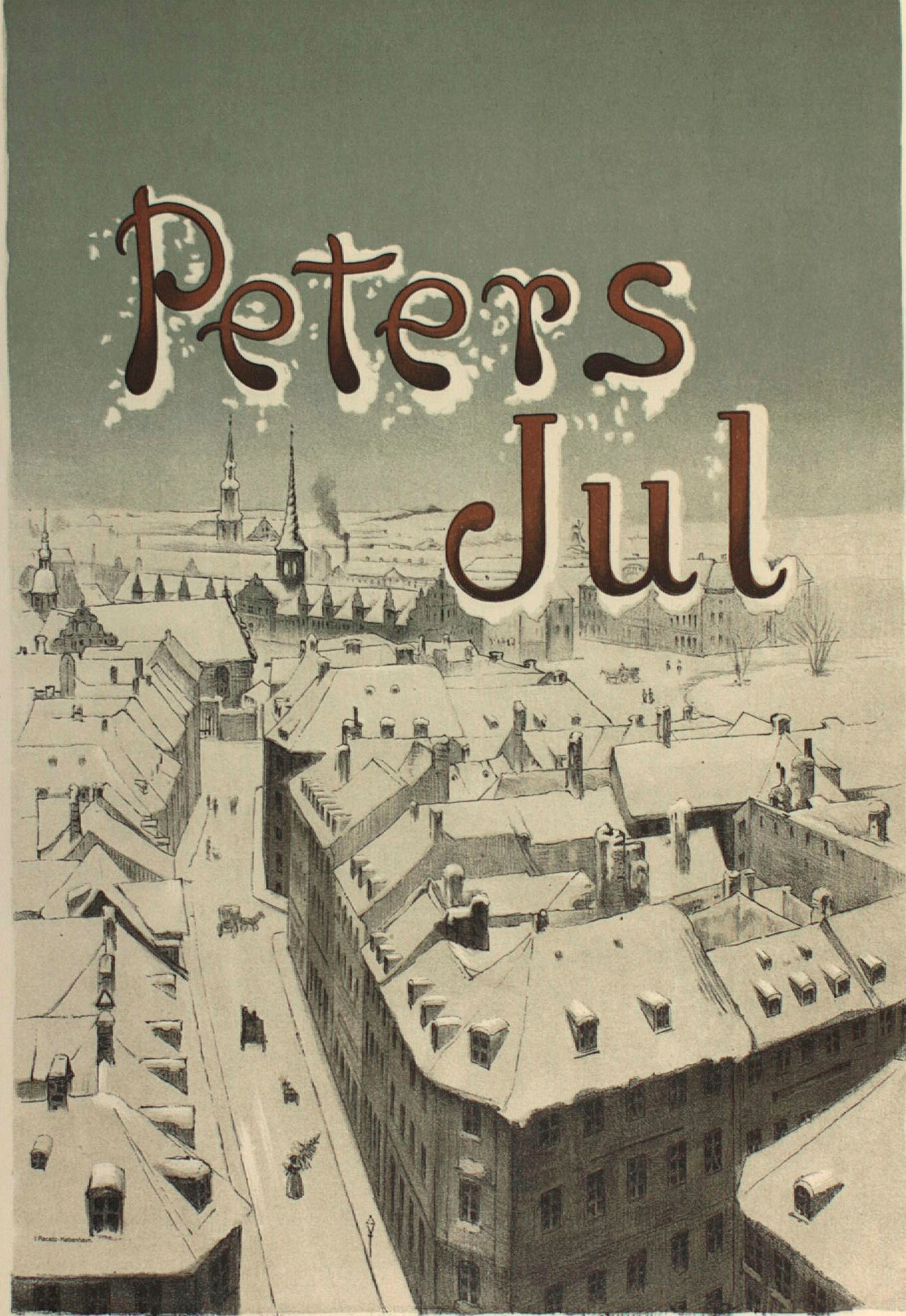
Admiralgade seen on the cover of Peters Jul with Fortunstræde 1 in the foreground.

== Today ==
Borgervennen, a fraternal society founded in 11688, purchased the building in 1973 via Borgervennens Ejendomsfond. The association's office and meeting room is located in the apartment on the first floor. There is a retail space in the basement and apartments on the other floors.

== Cultural references ==
The building is seen in the foreground on Frants Henningsen's bird's eye view drawing for the cover of the 1889 edition of Johan Krohn's classic Danish Christmas storey Peters Jul.

== Gallery ==
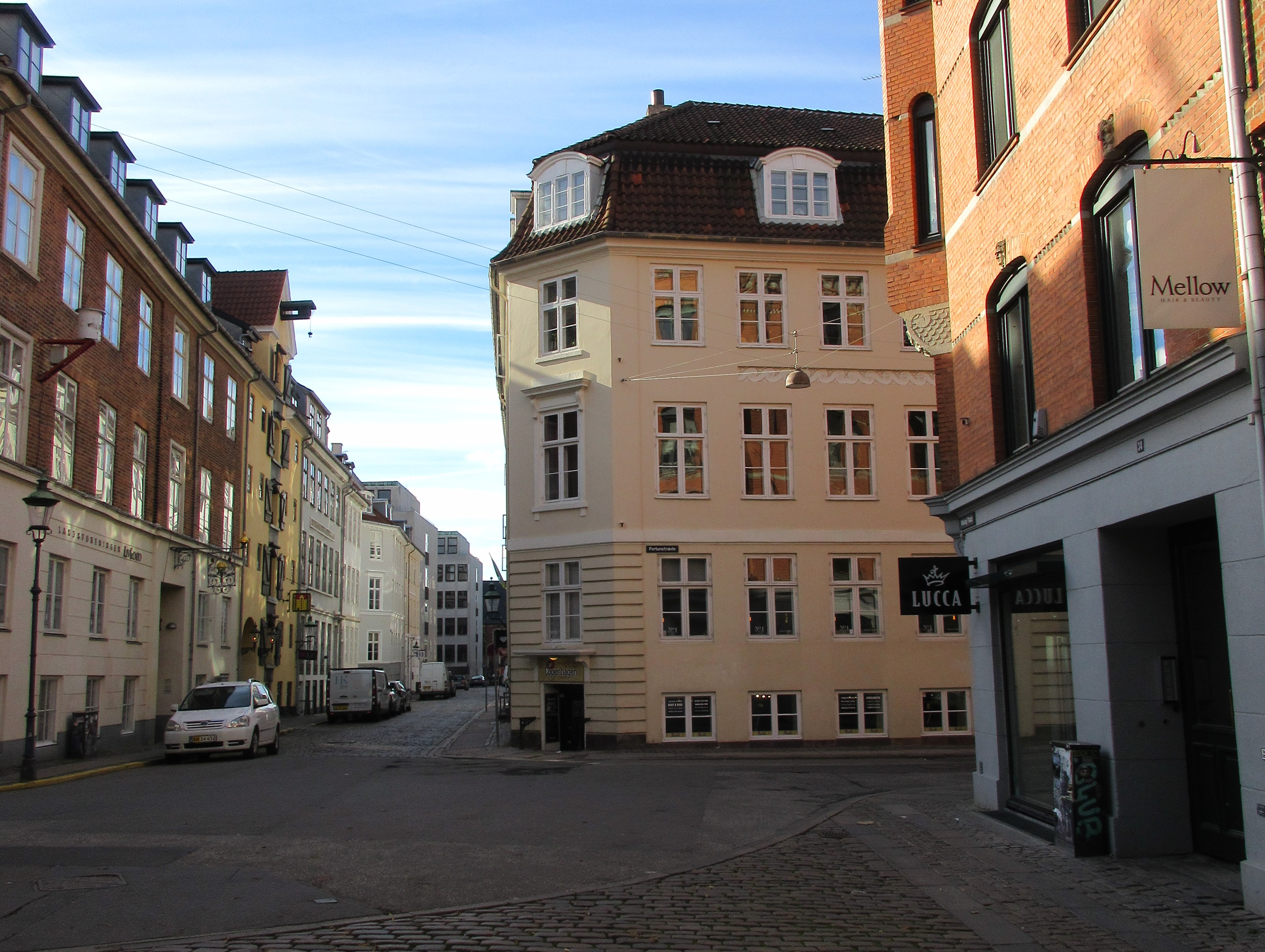
The building seen from Nikolaj Plads

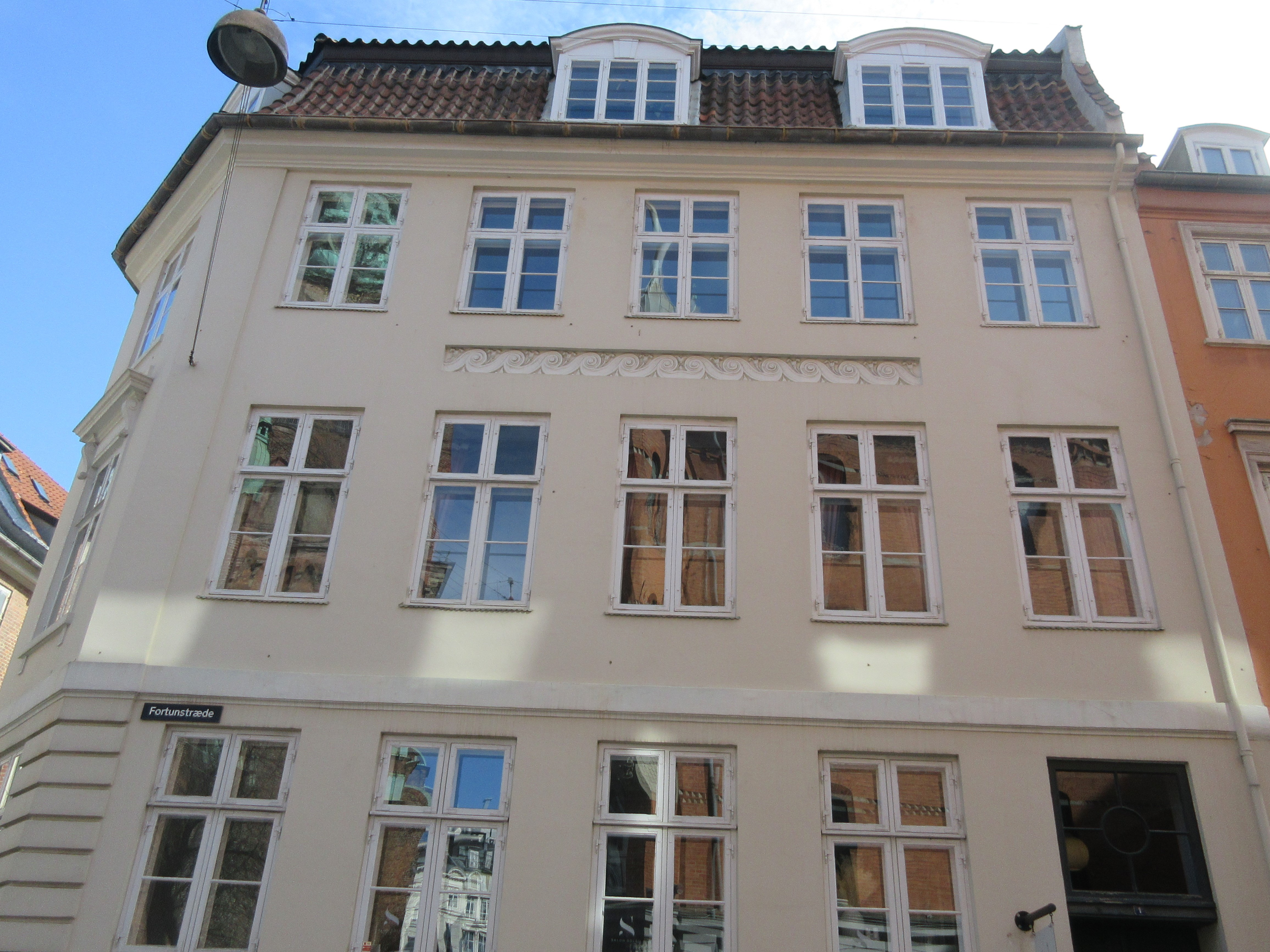
Facade towards Fortunstræde

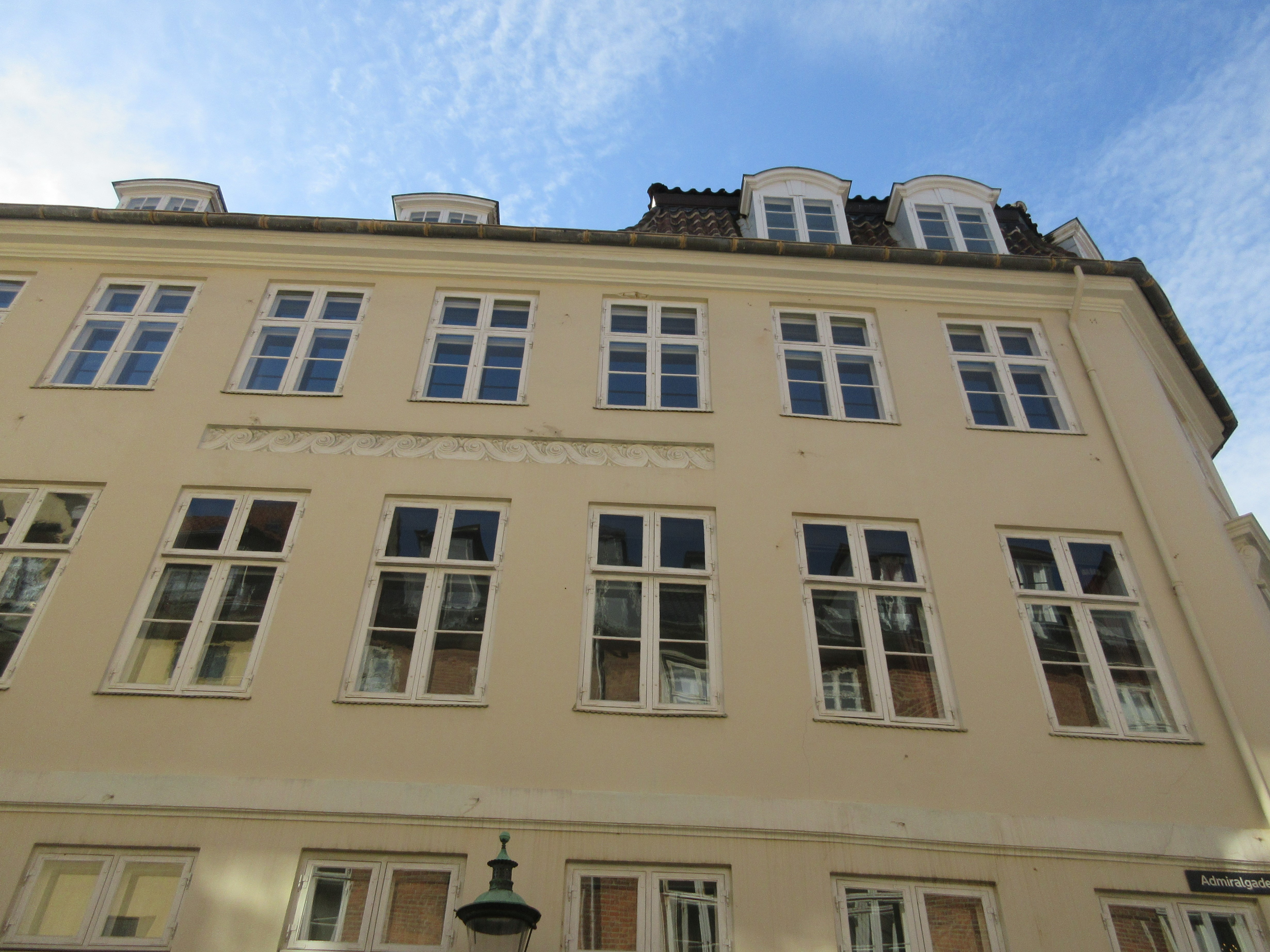
The facade towards Admiralgade

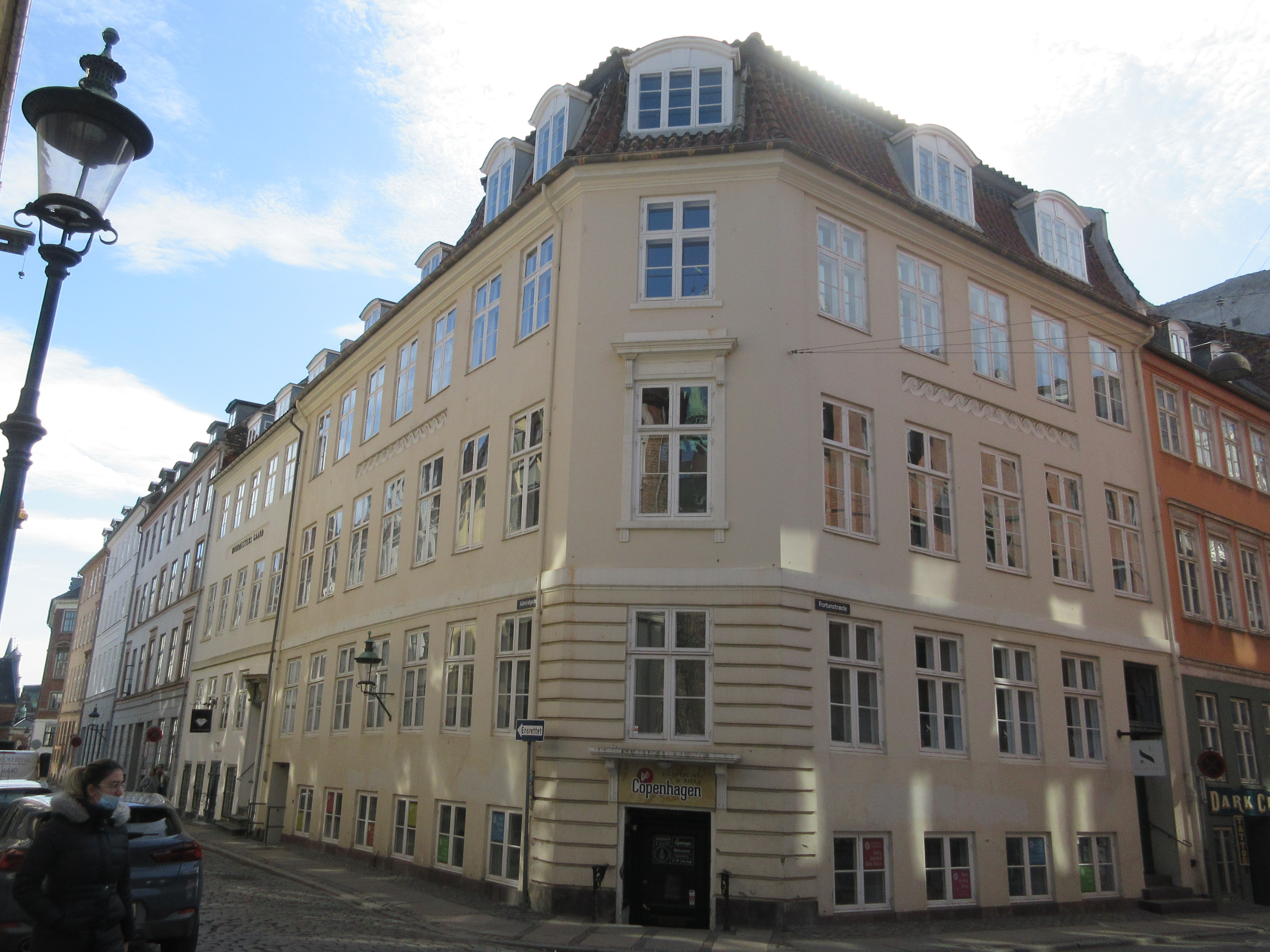
Fortunstræde 1 seen from the corner

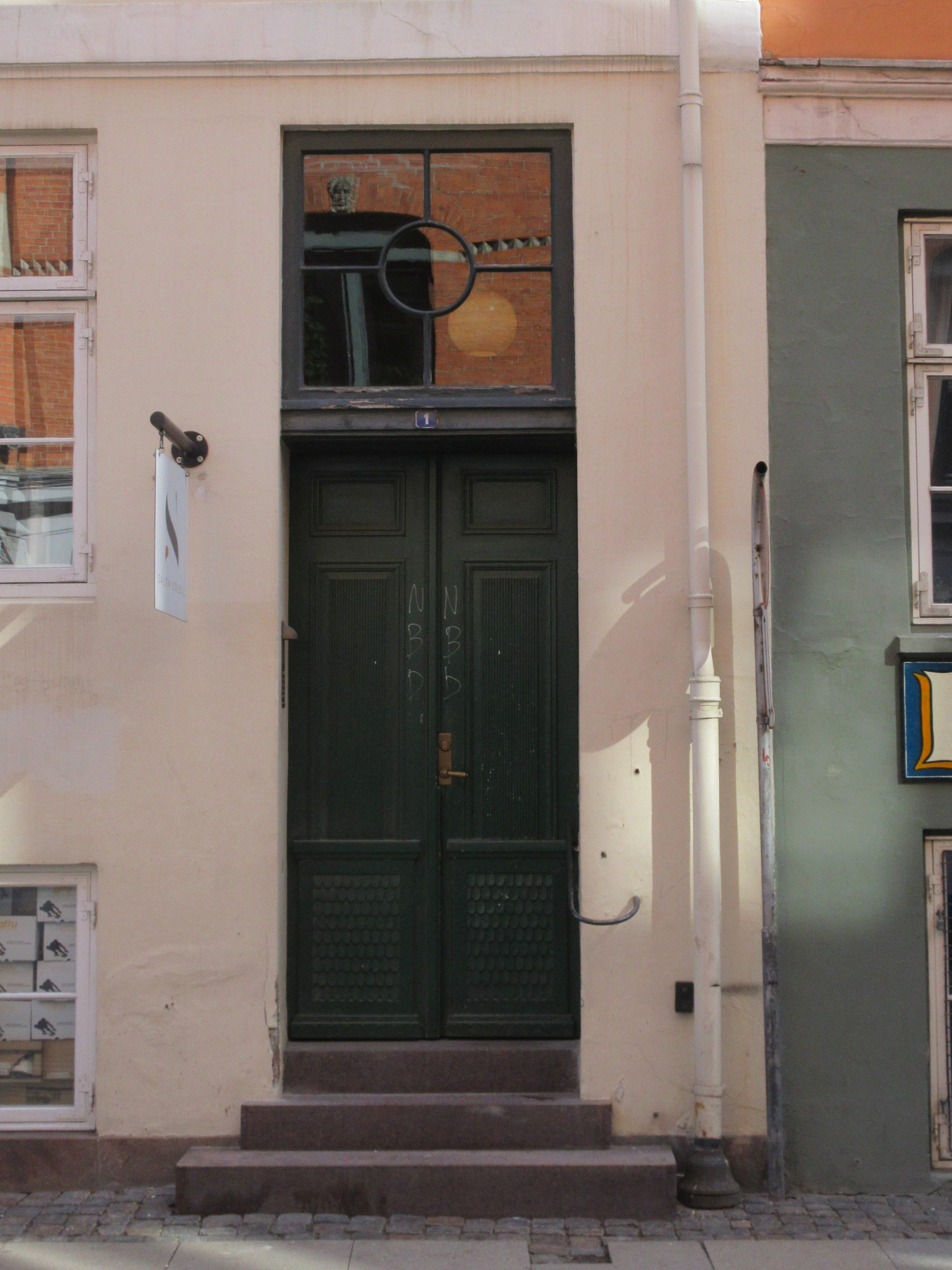
Main entrance in Fortunstræde

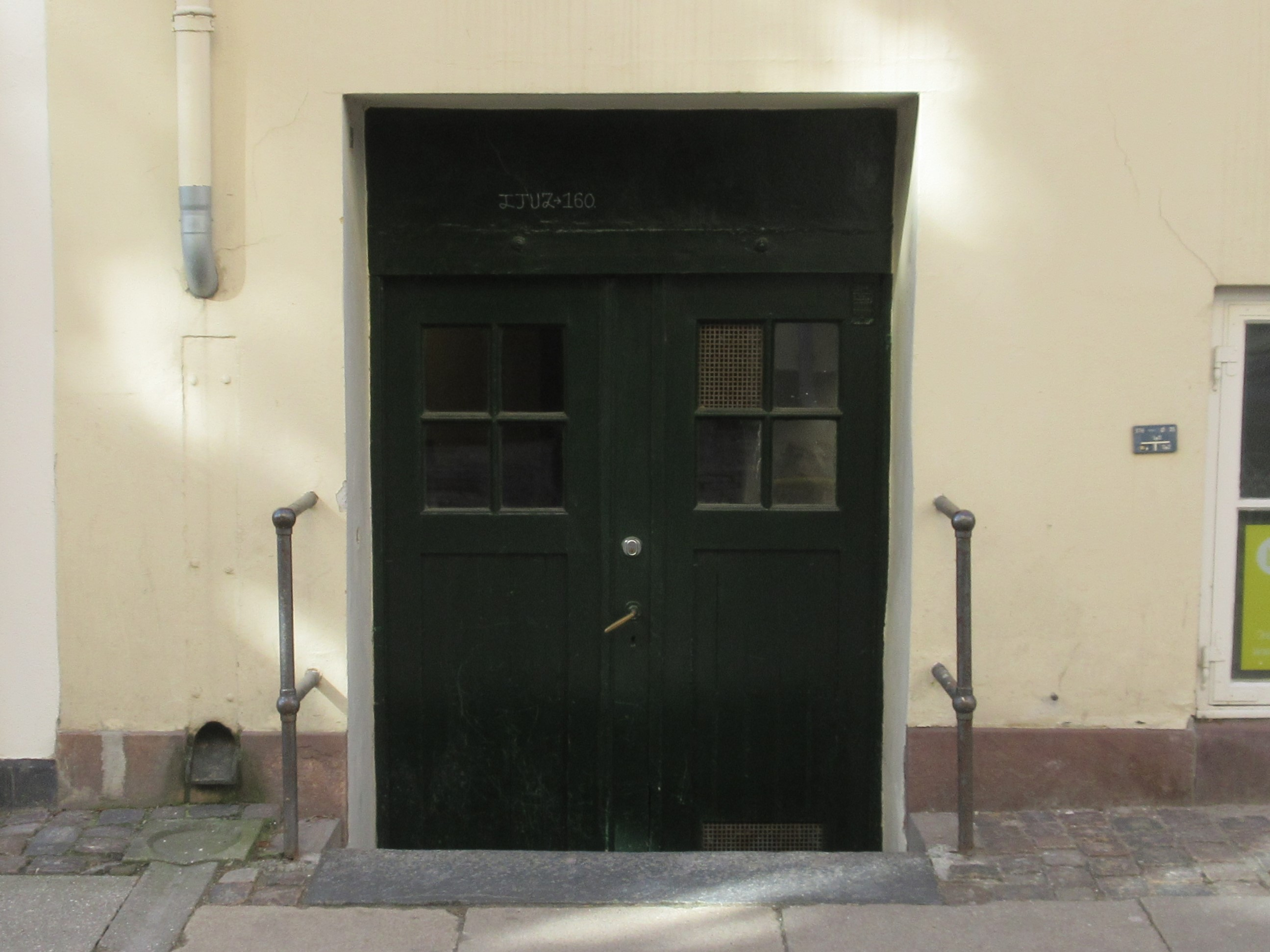
Basement entrance in Admiralgade
