= Jens Edvard Kraft =

Norwegian literary historian (1784–1853)

Jens Edvard Kraft (22 December 1784 – 21 July 1853) was a Norwegian judicial officer, statistician, bibliographer, and literary historian. His writings are a valuable source of knowledge about pre-industrial Norway. He was jointly the author of a historic lexicon of Scandinavian Literature.

== Biography ==
Jens Kraft was born in Kristiansand, Norway. He was the son of Even Jensen Kraft (1745–1814) and Marie Hielm (1744–1820). In 1800, Kraft went to the University of Copenhagen where he studied first theology and then law. In 1807, he took a law degree.

From 1808–14, Kraft worked as a translator at the court in Kristiansand. From 1814 he was deputy in the Ministry of the Interior. From 1818, he served in the Ministry of Finance, then served as bureau chief in the Ministry of Audit from 1822 and in the Ministry of Finance from 1823. In 1828 he became expeditionary secretary in the Ministry of Audit. From 1832 until his death in 1853 he was Magistrate in Mandal.

In the years 1751–1753, he published a number of short textbooks on logic, ontology, cosmology, psychology and natural theology. In 1812, he entered into a collaboration with Danish librarian Rasmus Nyerup and jointly published (in 1818–20) Almindelig Morskabslæsning i Danmark og Norge igjennem Aarhundreder, a lexicon of the literature of Denmark, Norway and Iceland. Kraft was a member of the Royal Norwegian Society of Sciences and Letters from 1821. He was knighted by the Swedish Order of Vasa in 1838 and the Order of St. Olav in 1847.

== Selected works ==
- Almindelig Morskabslæsning i Danmark og Norge igjennem Aarhundreder (1818–20)
- Topographisk-statistisk Beskrivelse over Kongeriget Norge (1820–32)
- Historisk-topographisk Haandbog over Kongeriget Norge (1845–48)
- Norsk Forfatter-Lexikon 1814–1856 (1857)
- Norsk Forfatter-Lexicon: 1814–1856 (1863)
