= Volkmar Busch =

Danish composer

Joseph Marie François Volkmar Busch (20 November 1812 – 3 November 1893) was a Danish composer. He studied music with Friedrich Wieck in Leipzig.
