= Salomon Soldin =

Danish bookseller and publisher (1774–1837)

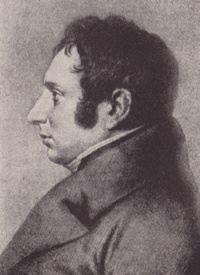
- Born: 15 March 1774; Copenhagen, Denmark
- Died: 27 November 1837 (aged 63); Copenhagen, Copenhagen
- Occupations: Publisher, editor, bookseller, writer
- Known for: Soldins Stiftelse

Salomon Soldin (15 March 1774 - 27 November 1837) was a Danish bookseller, publisher, editor, writer and translator.

== Early life and background ==
Soldin was born into a Jewish family in Copenhagen, the son of Israel Isak Soldin, a merchant, and Malka (née Isserl)m who had emigrated to Denmark from Germany. He had four brothers and four sisters.

== Career ==
Salomon Soldin trained as a bookseller with his elder brother Abraham Soldin (1769–1834) and became a partner in the company in an early age. A third brother was the antique book seller Hartvig Soldin (1763–1843). The brothers Salomon and Abraham Soldin created a publishing house of considerable size. Their publications included H. A. Kofod's first encyclopedia which was published in 20 volumes from 1816, a popular series of travel books (34 volumes) and many school books.

Soldin was editor of the journal Nyeste Skilderie af Kjøbenhavn from 1804–25 and its publisher from 1811. He wrote many of the articles himself while other contributors included Rasmus Nyerup, Knud Lyhne Rahbek, N.F.S. Grundtvig and Christian Molbech.

== Personal life ==
Soldin married Hanne Ruben (16 January 1775 - 15 November). She was the daughter of merchant in Helsingør Ephraim Magnus Ruben (1732–1813) and Sara Ruben née Moses (c. 1746 – 1815). The couple had no children.

== Philanthropy ==
Salomon and Hanne Soldin founded the charity Salomon Soldin og hustru Hanne Soldins stiftelse in their will. It purchased Trøstens Bolig at Skindergade 34 in Copenhagen in 1854, converting it into a home for indigent widows and unmarried women of the middle class.
