= Ernst Burmeister =

Danish architect

Joachim Ernst Burmeister ( –1806) was a German-Danish architect and master carpenter. He made a significant contribution to the rebuilding of Copenhagen in the years after the Copenhagen Fire of 1795. He was the father of master builder Andreas Burmeister:

== Early life and education ==
Burmeister was born in Hamburg but the year of his birth is not known. He moved to Copenhagen in an early age where worked as a carpenter for Andreas Kirkerup and attended the Royal Danish Academy of Fine Arts, winning its large gold medal in 1774.

== Career ==
Burmeister was licensed as a master carpenter in 1790. He employed a total of 77 carpenters in 1794. He was very active in the rebuilding of the city during the years after the Copenhagen Fire of 1795. His buildings were designed with inspiration from Caspar Frederik Harsdorff's Neoclassicism.

== Personal life ==
Burmeister married Anna Catherina Gockler (Gorgler, Kochler) in 1780. She was a daughter of beer vendor (øltapper) Valentin Gockler.

== Selected works ==
Burmeisters works include:

- Fortunstræde 3, Copenhagen (1796)
- Admiralgade 20, Copenhagen (1797–1798)
- Vestergade 8, Copenhagen (1798)
- Lille Kirkestræde 3, Copenhagen (1798–1799 with M. Bälchow)
- Badstuestræde 10A, Copenhagen (1798–1799)
- Badstuestræde 12, Copenhagen (1799–1800)
- Knabrostræde 9, Copenhagen (1799–1800)

== Gallery ==
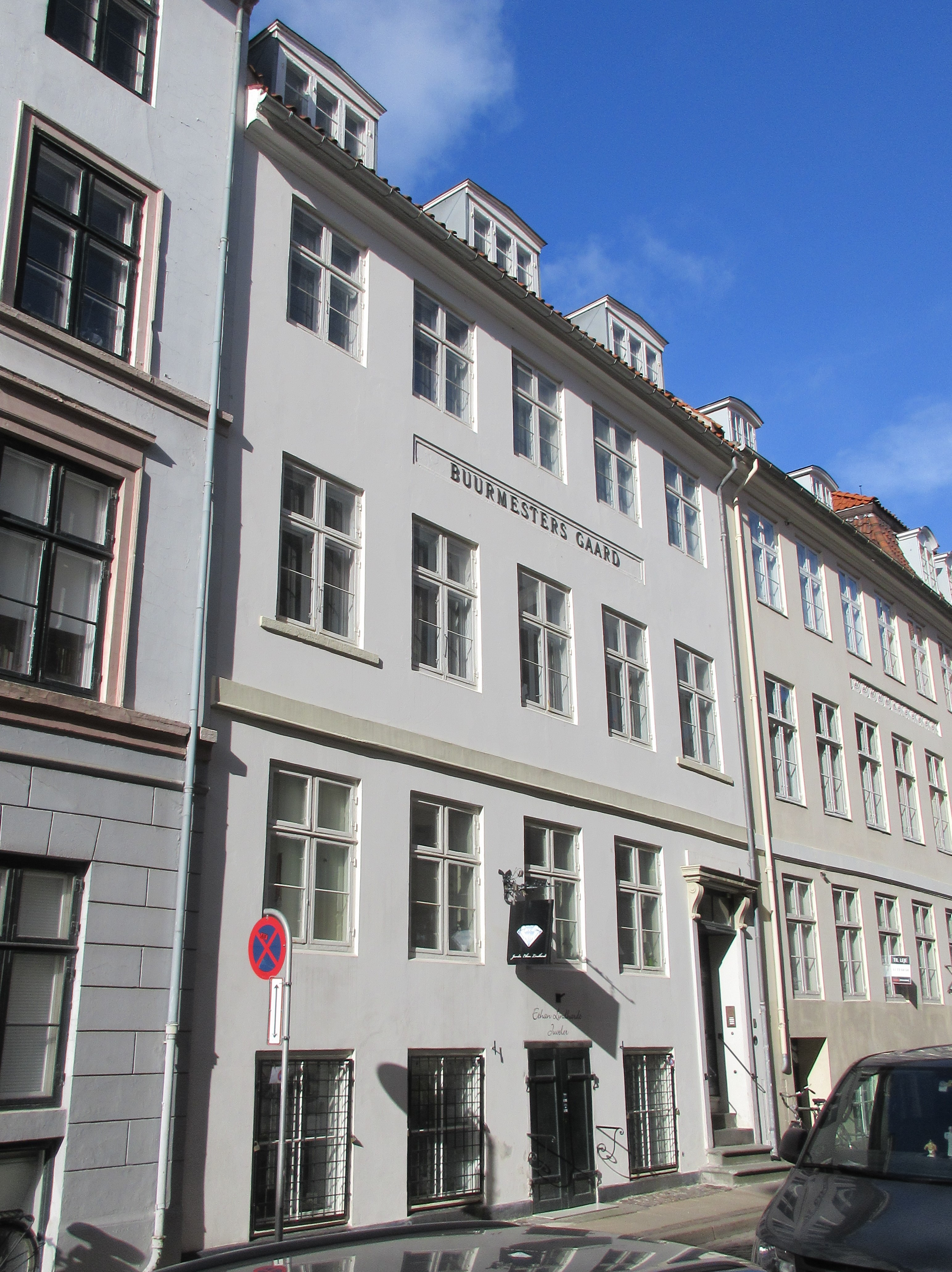
Admiralgade 20, Copenhagen

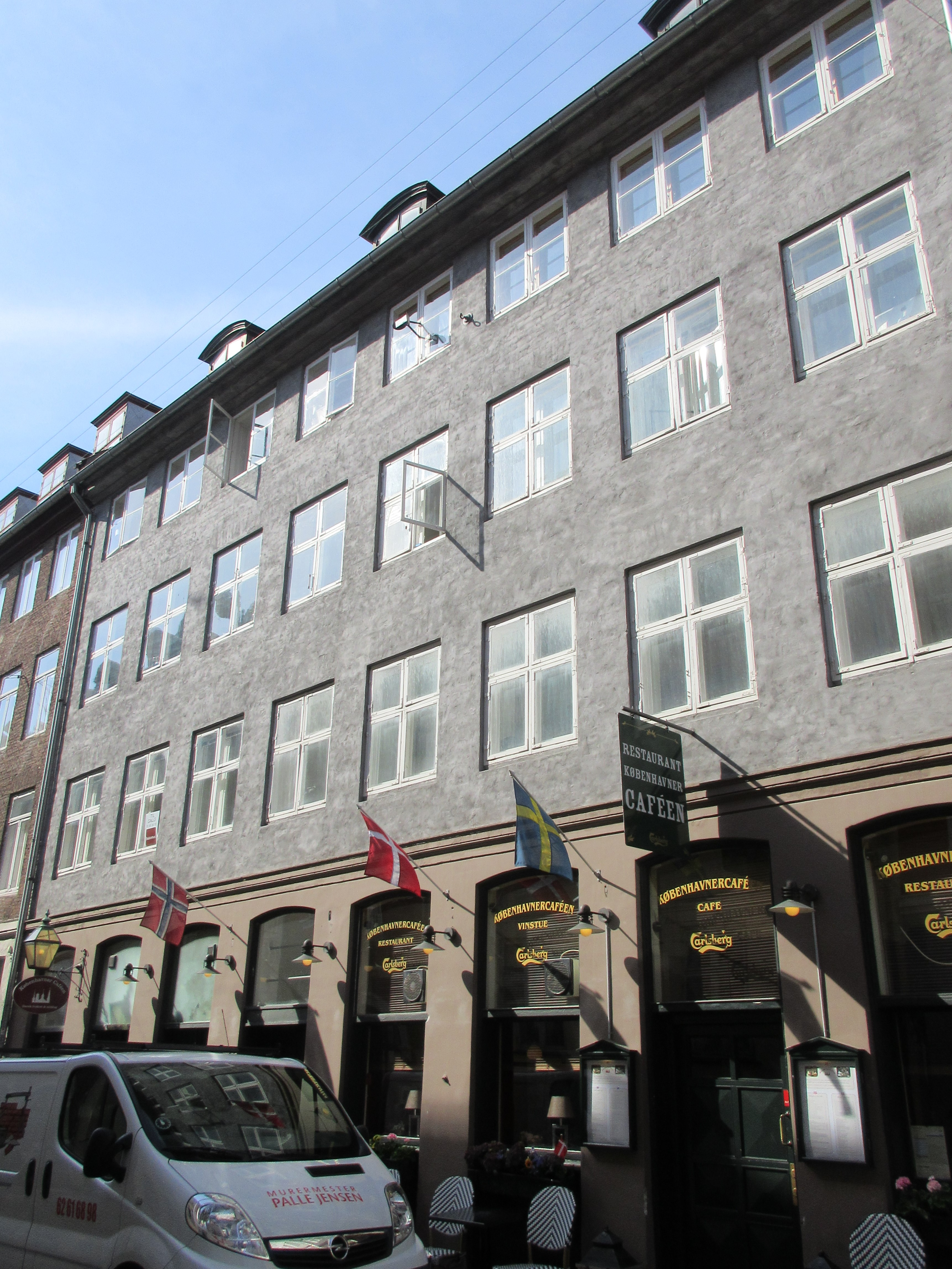
Badsturestræde 10, Copenhagen

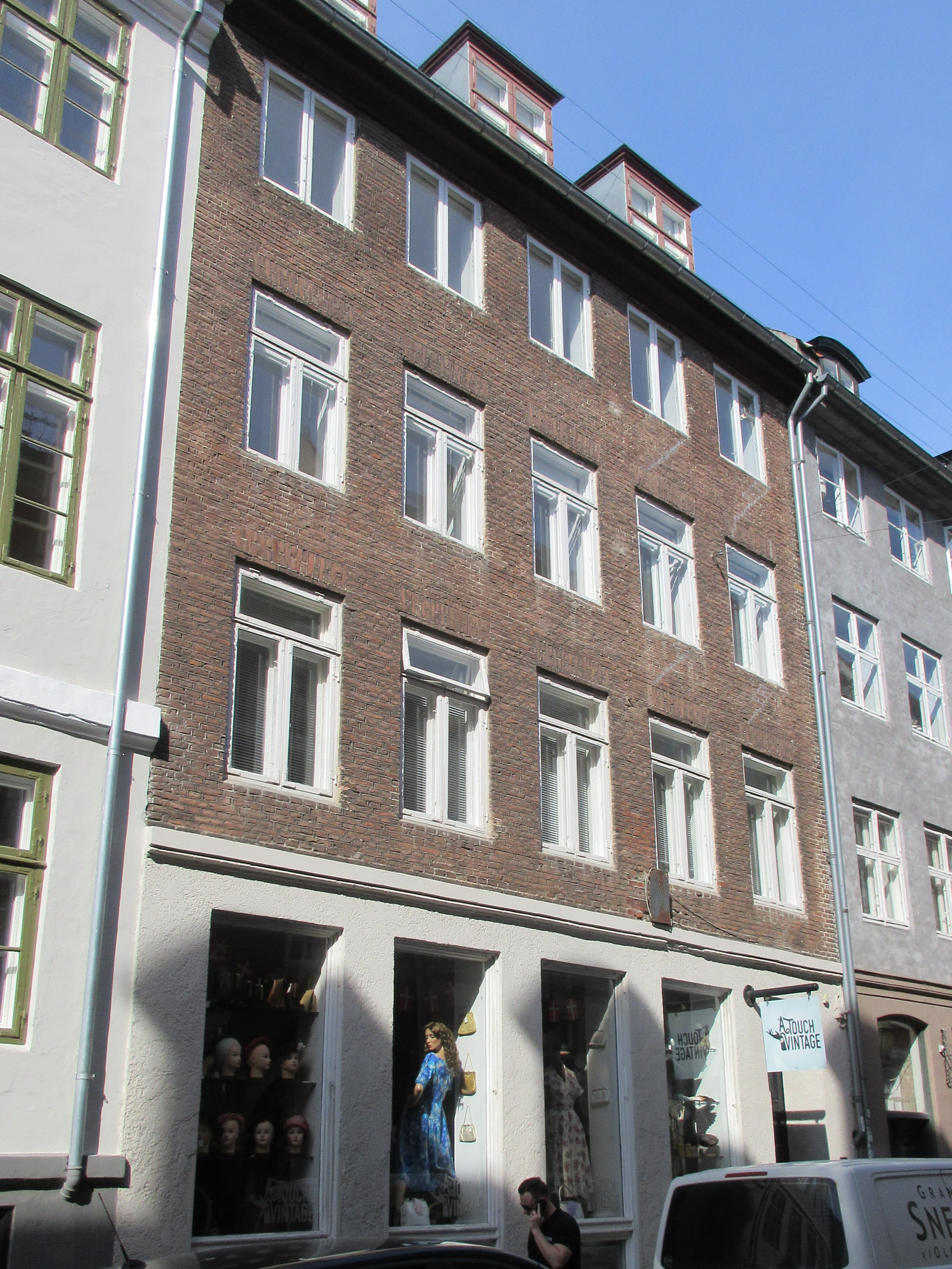
Badstuestræde 12, Copenhagen

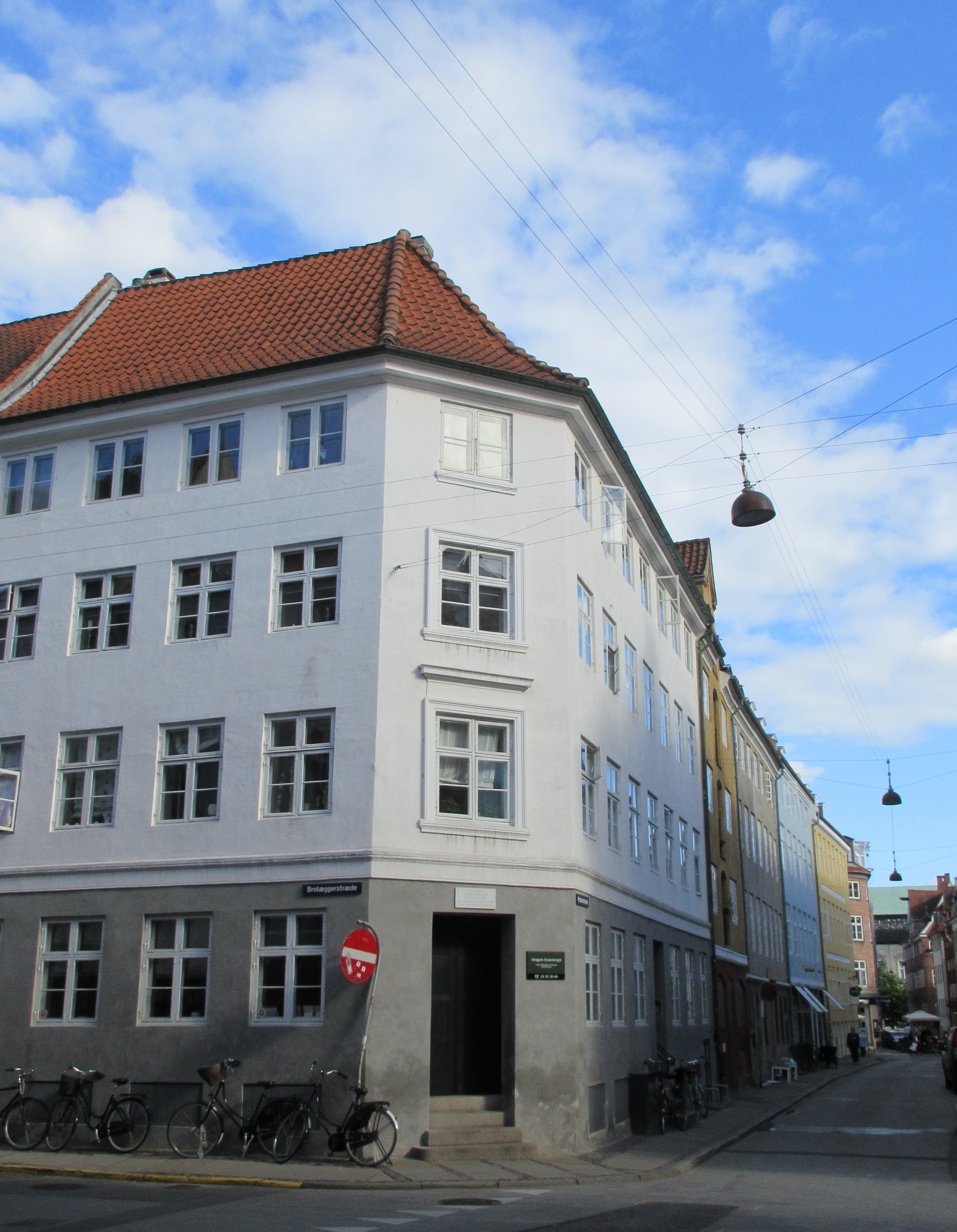
Knabrostræde 9, Copenhagen
