= Rasmus Nyerup =

Danish literary historian, philologist, folklorist and librarian

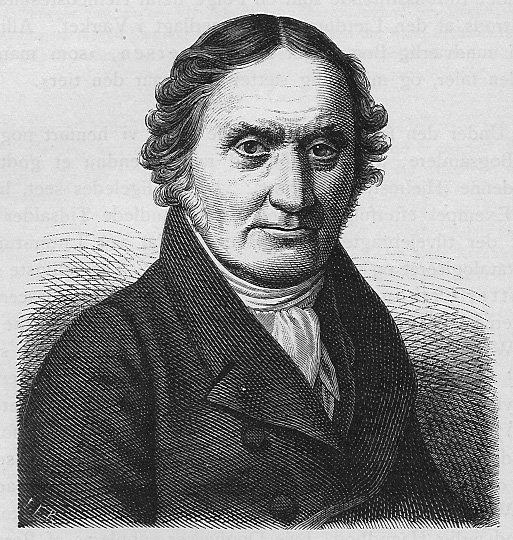

Rasmus Nyerup (12 March 1759–28 June 1829) was a Danish literary historian, philologist, folklorist and librarian.

== Biography ==
He was born at the village of Nyrup near Glamsbjerg on Funen, Denmark. After graduating from Odense Lærde Skole, Nyerup studied philology and theology and took exams in resp. 1779 and 1780. He was assistant at the Royal Library from 1778, and its secretary during 1709–1803. In the period 1790–1797, he was editor of the literary-critical journal Kiøbenhavnske lærde Efterretninger. He became a professor of literary history at the University of Copenhagen in 1796. From 1803, he was head librarian of Copenhagen University Library.

Nyerup wrote and published a number of historical, literary-historical and cultural-historical works. Together With Rasmus Rask (1787–1832), he published a Danish translation of the Prose Edda in 1808, and with Jens Edvard Kraft (1784–1853) a general literary history of Denmark, Norway and Iceland (1818/9). Together with Knud Lyne Rahbek (1760–1830) and Werner Abrahamson (1744-1812), Nyerup was also responsible for the publication of folk songs from the Middle Ages in Udvalgte Danske Viser fra Middelalderen (Copenhagen: J. F. Schulz, 1812–14).

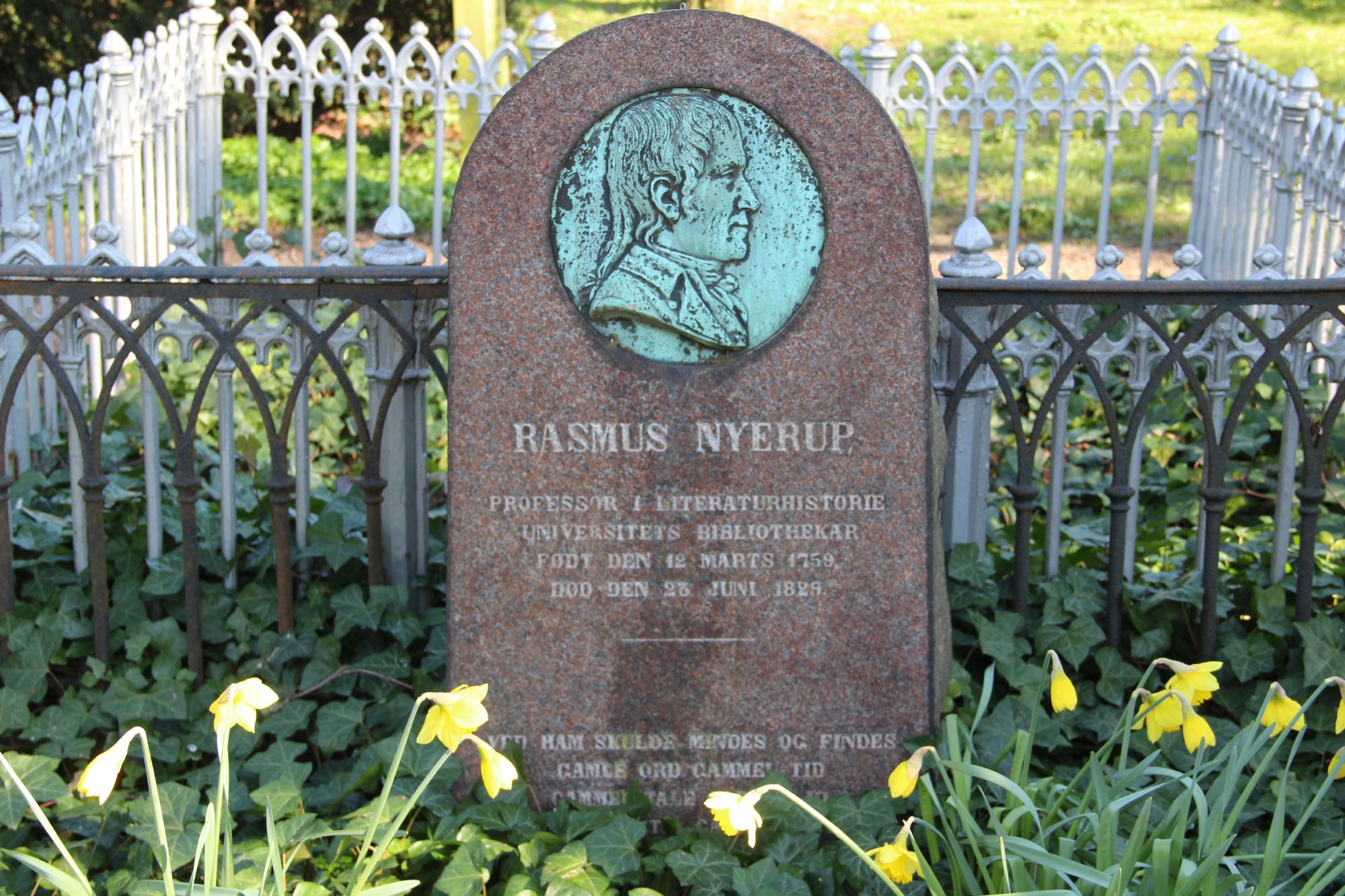
The tomb of Rasmus Nyerup at Assistens Cemetery in Copenhagen.

Nyerup was co-founder of the society Selskabet for Efterslægten (1786) and the Scandinavian Literary Society (1796). As secretary of the Royal Commission on the Preservation of Antiquities (Den kongelige Commission til Oldsagers Opbevaring), Nyerup also helped Christian Jürgensen Thomsen (1788–1865) initiate the foundation of the National Museum of Denmark.

== Other sources ==
- C.L.Ström, Professor og Ridder Rasmus Nyerups Levnetslöb, beskrevet af ham selv (1829).
- Hjort, N.: List of Professor Rasmus Nyrup of hans Slægt, Historisk Samfund (1927)
