= 1850 in Denmark =

- Decades: 1830s; 1840s; 1850s; 1860s; 1870s
- See also: Other events of 1850; List of years in Denmark

Events from the year 1850 in Denmark.

== Incumbents ==
- Monarch – Frederick VII
- Prime minister – Adam Wilhelm Moltke

== Events ==
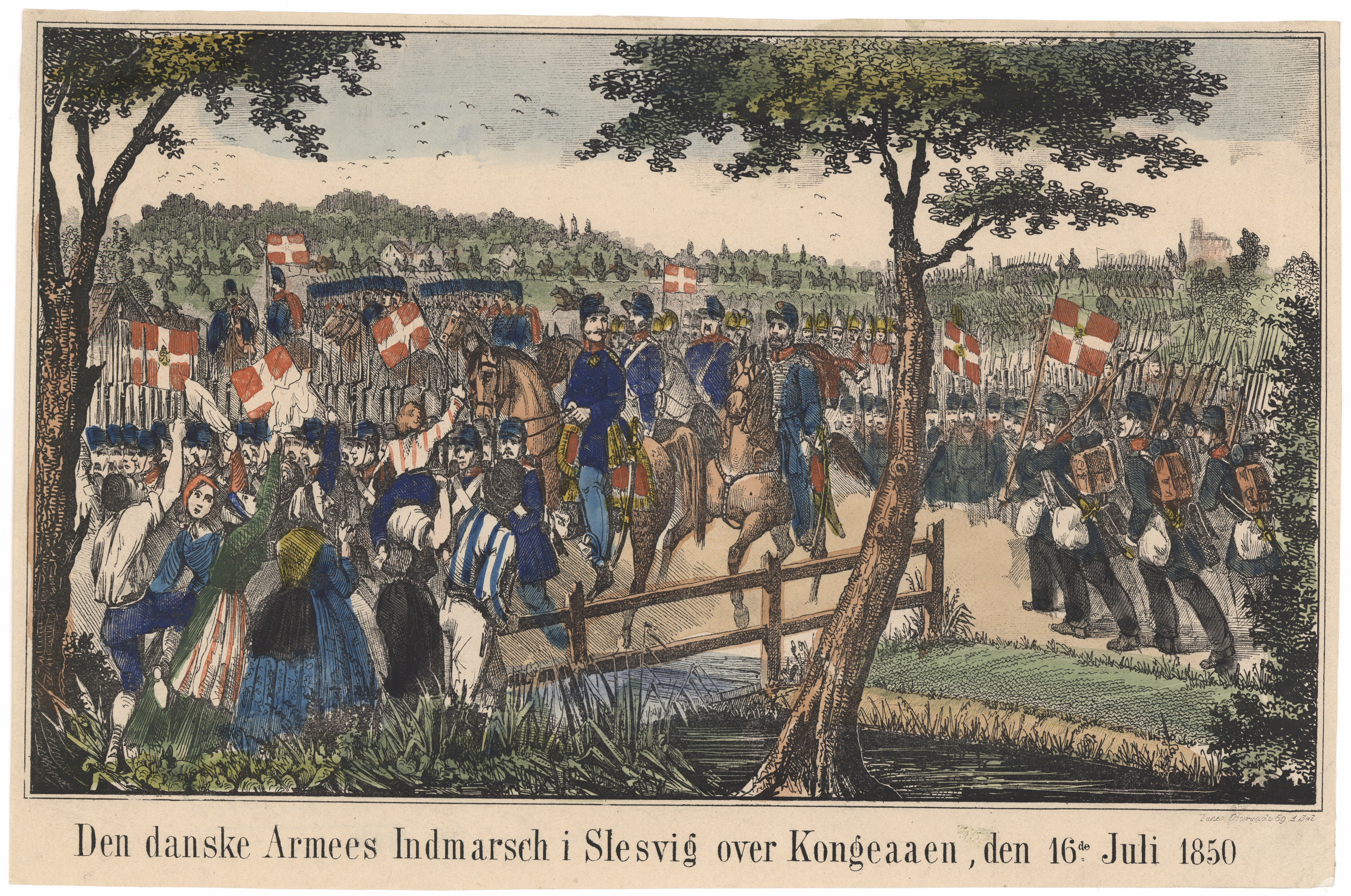
16 July: The Danish army moves into Slesvig.

- 30 March – All Danish Gold Coast Settlements are sold to Britain and incorporated into the British Gold Coast
- 16 July: The Danish army moves into Slesvig.

=== Undated ===
- 30 March – Denmark sells the Danish Gold Coast to the United Kingdom

== Culture ==
- 5 March – Hans Christian Andersen's poem Danmark, mit fædreland is published in the newspaper Fædrelandet.
- 8 May – Hans Christian Andersen's Danmark, mit fædreland is first time performed publicly as a song by a men's choir to a melody by Henrik Rung at a concert arranged by the Scandinavian Society in the Casino Theatre in Copenhagen to raise money for a monument commemorating the Danish victory in the Battle of Fredericia.

== Births ==
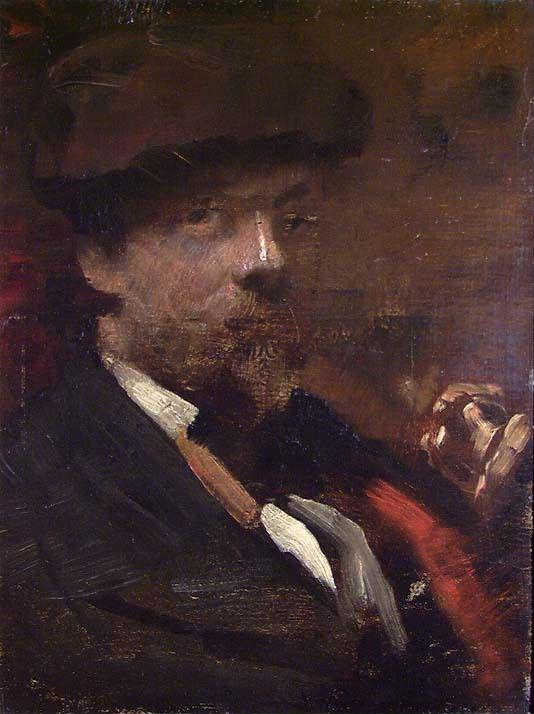
Frants Henningsen

=== January–March ===
- 14 January – Elisabeth Wandel, painter (died 1926)
- 25 February – Anders Thiset, archivist (died 1917)
- 16 March – Agnes Lunn, painter and sculptor (died 1941)

=== April–June ===
- 10 June – Nielsine Nielsen, businesswoman (died 1916)
- 22 June – Frants Henningsen, painter (died 1908)
- 27 June – Jørgen Pedersen Gram, mathematician (died 1017)

=== July–September ===
- 10 July – Valdemar Gætje, master baker and the first director of the Union of Danish Employers and Master Craftsmen (died 1905)

=== October–December ===
- 2 November – Antonio Jacobsen, painter (died 1921)
- 29 December – Valdemar Irminger, painter (died 1938)

== Deaths ==
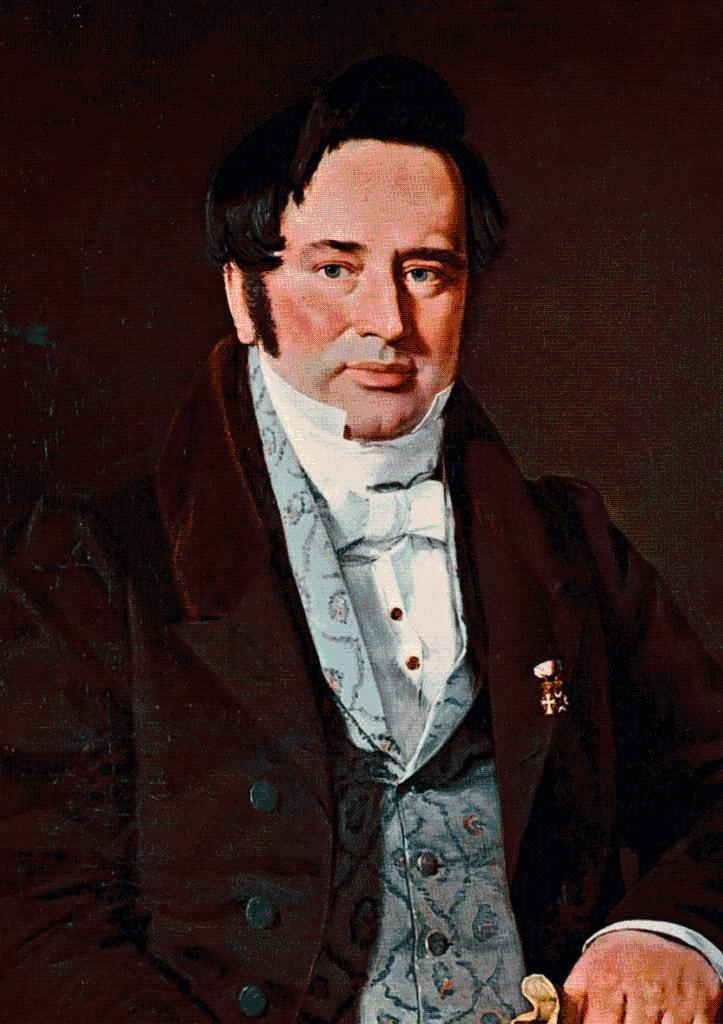
Adam Oehlenschläger

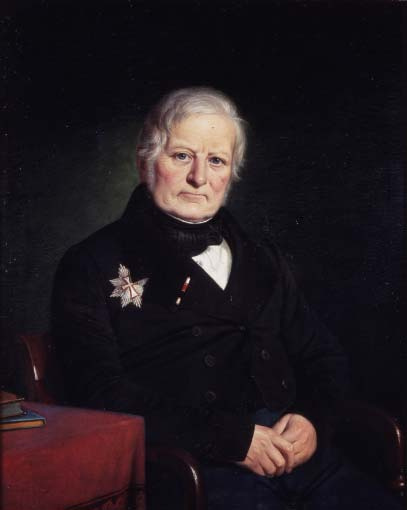
Nicolai Abraham Holten

=== January–March ===
- 8 January – Frederik Christian Kielsen, educator and publisher (born 1774)
- 20 January – Adam Oehlenschläger, poet (born 1779)
- 9 May – Princess Juliane Sophie of Denmark, princess of Denmark (born 1788)

=== April–June ===
- 12 May – Nicolai Abraham Holten, banker and civil servant (born 1775)
- 2 August – Carl Neergaard, landowner and politician (born 1800)
- 12 November – Christian Frederik Zeuthen, landowner (born 1794)

=== July–September ===
- 25 July – Adolph Stramboe, ballet dancer (born 1801)

=== October–December ===
- 38 December– Heinrich Christian Schumacher, astronomer (died 1780)
