= Admiralgade 22 =

Apartment building in Copenhagen, Denmark

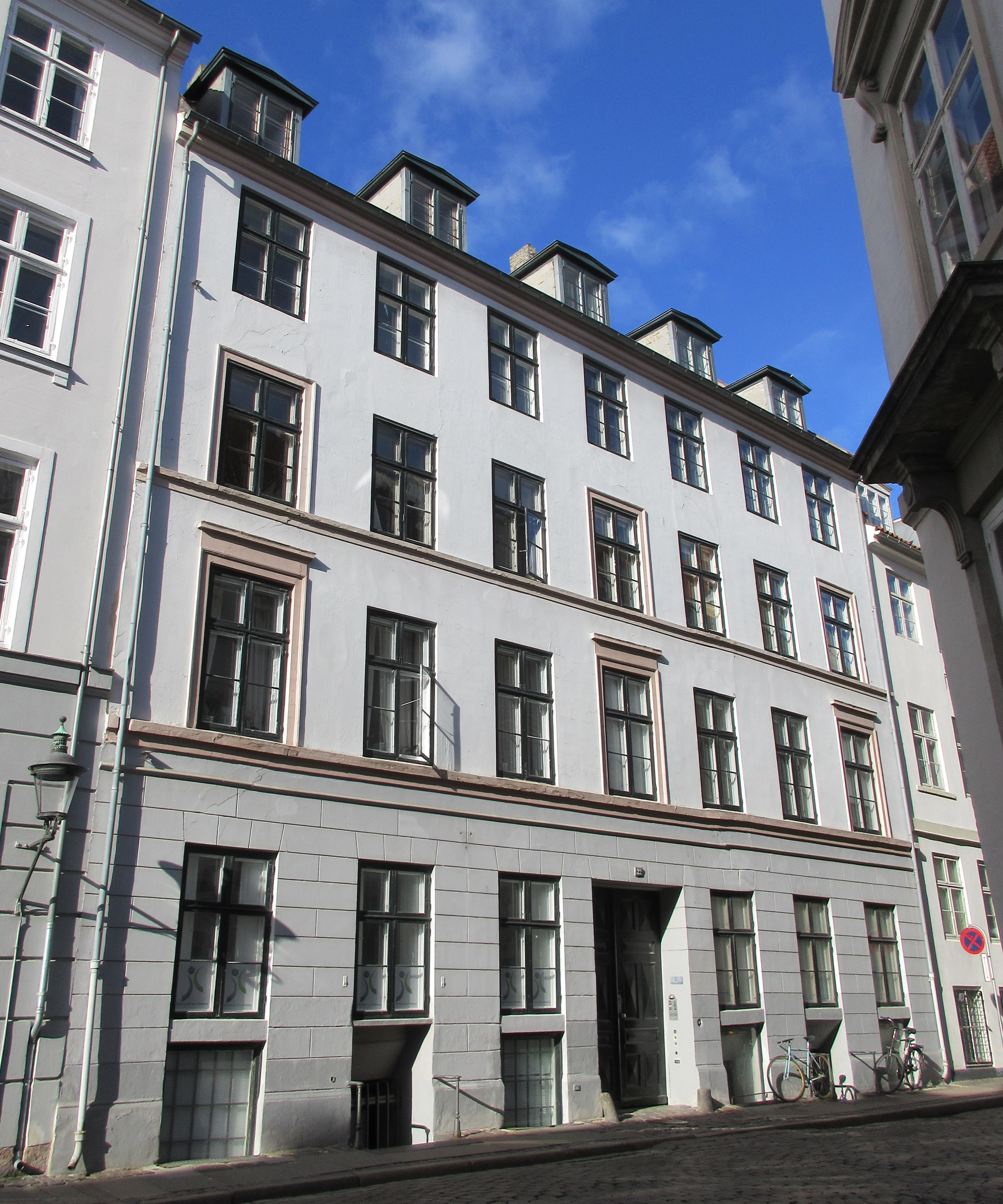
- The building seen from Boldhusgade
- Interactive map of the Admiralgade 22 area

General information
- Architectural style: Neoclassical
- Location: Copenhagen, Denmark
- Coordinates: 55°40′40.26″N 12°34′54.59″E
- Completed: 1845

Admiralgade 22 (1859–1894: Admiralgade 18) is a Neoclassical apartment building situated close to Nikolaj Plads in Copenhagen, Denmark. It was constructed in 1845–46 for a wholesale merchant named Harboe for whom Ved Stranden 16 on the other side of the block was also heightened by one storey. The two buildings was at the same time divided into two separate properties. Admiralgade 22 was listed in the Danish registry of protected buildings and places in 1959. The scope of the heritage listing was extended in 1988. Notable former residents include the ballet dancer Adolph Stramboe.

== History ==
=== Site history, 1689–1845 ===
The site in Admiralgade was formerly made up of two smaller properties. The larger northern property was listed in Copenhagen's first cadastre of 1689 as No. 205 in Eastern Quarter, owned by kancelliforvalter Rasmus Rasmussen. Rasmussen was the first owner of the property. On 14 June 1668, he had purchased a portion of No. 201 (now Fortunstræde 1) from Karen Andersdatter (widow of Peder Martensen Kreitun). On 6 April 1786, he also purchased the much larger adjacent property No. 213 on the other side of the block. No. 205 was after Rasmussen's death on 11 January 1708 sold to his daughter Christine Rasmusdatter, widow of secretary Gerhard Neve. On 14 June 1709, she sold it to regiment quarter master Johan Merezien. On 11 June 1722, he sold it to court scribe (hofskriver) Iver Jentoft. He remained the owner of the property until at least 1728. The smaller southern property in Admiralgade was listed in the cadastre of 1689 as No. 206 and belonged to royal pastry chef (hofkonditor) Henrik Lydersen. He had acquired the property on 21 September 1668 from Anders Søebøtker. The property was after Lydersen's death on 5 January 1701 sold to inspector at Øresund Costum House Johan Frederik Meyer. On 6 February 1701, he sold it to auctionholder at Hofretten Peder Alexandersen. On his death, it was by his widow on 11 December 1720 sold to Laurids Christensen Møller. He remained the owner until at least 1728.

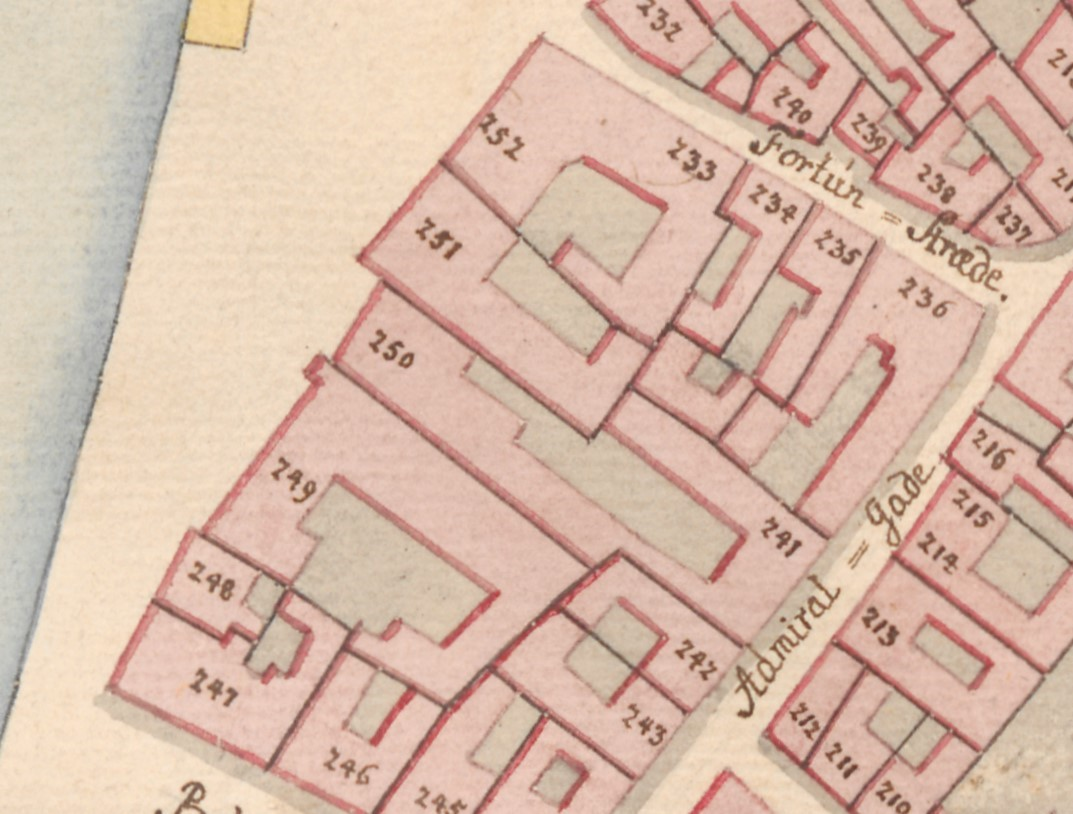
No. 242-243 and No. 250 seen on a detail from Christian Gedde's map of East Quarter, 1757.

Rasmussen's former properties were later acquired by Stephen Hansen. They were listed in the new cadastre of 1756 as No. 241 (Admiralgade) and No. 250 (Ved Stranden). The adjacent property in Admiralgade (old No. 206) was listed as No. 242 and belonged to Josef Volandt at that time.

Stephen Hansen's former properties were later acquired by the sugar manufacturer Valentin Madsen. No. 241 was not registered with any residents at the time of the 1787, indicating that the small property in Admiralgade was probably either the site of his sugar house or of a stable, warehouse or some other secondary building. No. 242 belonged to barkeeper Karen Issing at the time of the 1787 census. She resided in the building with her niece Abigael Reinberg (aged 21), her second husband's daughter Willum Willumsen (aged 17), two maids and one lodger at that time.

The buildings in Admiralgade were both destroyed in the Copenhagen Fire of 1795. Madsen's house on the other side of the block was on the other hand one of few buildings in the area that survived the fire. He subsequently purchased the fire site of No. 242. The three properties were subsequently merged into a single property. It was listed in the new cadastre of 1806 as No. 153 in Easterb Quarter and were still owned by Madsen at that time.

=== Harboe and the new building ===
No. 153 was acquired by a wholesale merchant (grosserer) Harboe in the early 1840s, probably as a speculative investment. In 1845–46, he constructed a new four-storey apartment building on the part of the property that faced Admiralgade. He also heightened the existing building on the other side of the block by one storey. In 1845, No. 153 was divided into two separate properties (No. 153 A in Ved Stranden and No. 153 B in Admiralgade). In 1948, Harboe also constructed the building at Ny Kongensgade 4.

=== 1850 census ===
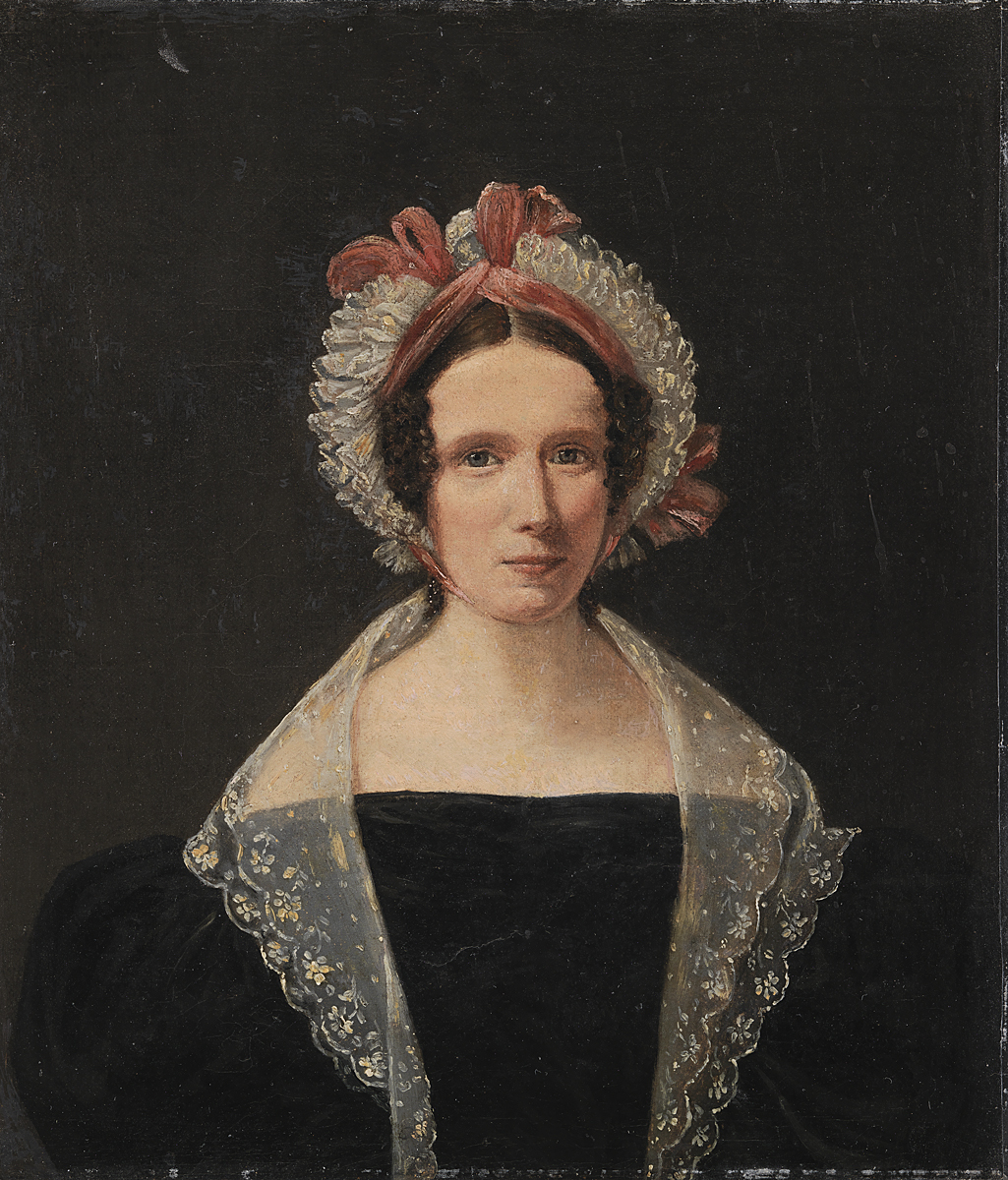
Sophie Stramboe painted by David Monies.

The property was home to 59 residents in 11 households at the 1850 census. Adolph Stramboe, a dancer at the Royal Danish Ballet, resided on the ground floor to the right with his wife Sophie Stramboe, their three daughters (aged 17 to 26). The daughter Laura Stramboe was also a dancer. Rasmus Bernhard Boesen, a building painter, resided on the ground floor to the left with his wife Laura Michaline Wilhelmine Boesen (née Koefoed), two lodgers and two maids. L. Chr. Schou, a senior bank clerk, resided on the first floor to the right with his wife Elisabeth Lind, their four children (aged 12 to 25) and one maid. Michael Weggelund Kildal Lund, a military surgeon, resided on the first floor to the left with 35-year-old Sallev Wilhelm Furst and one maid. D.A. Davidsen, a whilesale merchant (grosserer) resided on the second floor to the right with his wife Annette Davidsen and one maid. Morten Johansen, a grocer (urtekræmmer), resided on the second floor to the left with his wife Wilhelmine født Andersen, their seven children (aged one to 14), an employee in the grocery business, a male servant and three maids. Anna Lasson, widow of Major-General Iver Christian Lasson, resided on the third floor to the right with her daughter Sophie Lasson, jer son Georg Henr. Lasson (lieutenant) and three grandchildren. S.M. Block, a businessman, resided on the third floor to the left with sjip captain Niels Hansen, Hansen's wife Meta Kierstine Hansen, their six-uear-old daughter, the wife's sister Juliana Maria Petersen and one maid- Carl Ferdinand Lund, a brick-layer, resided in the garret to the left. Carl Julius Ferdinant Johansen, a grocer (urtekræmmer), resided in the rear wing with one employee. Carl Börge Möller, a manufacturer of wallpaper, resided on the first floor of the rear wing with his wife Johanne Caroline Bech and their two-year-old daughter.

=== 1860 census ===
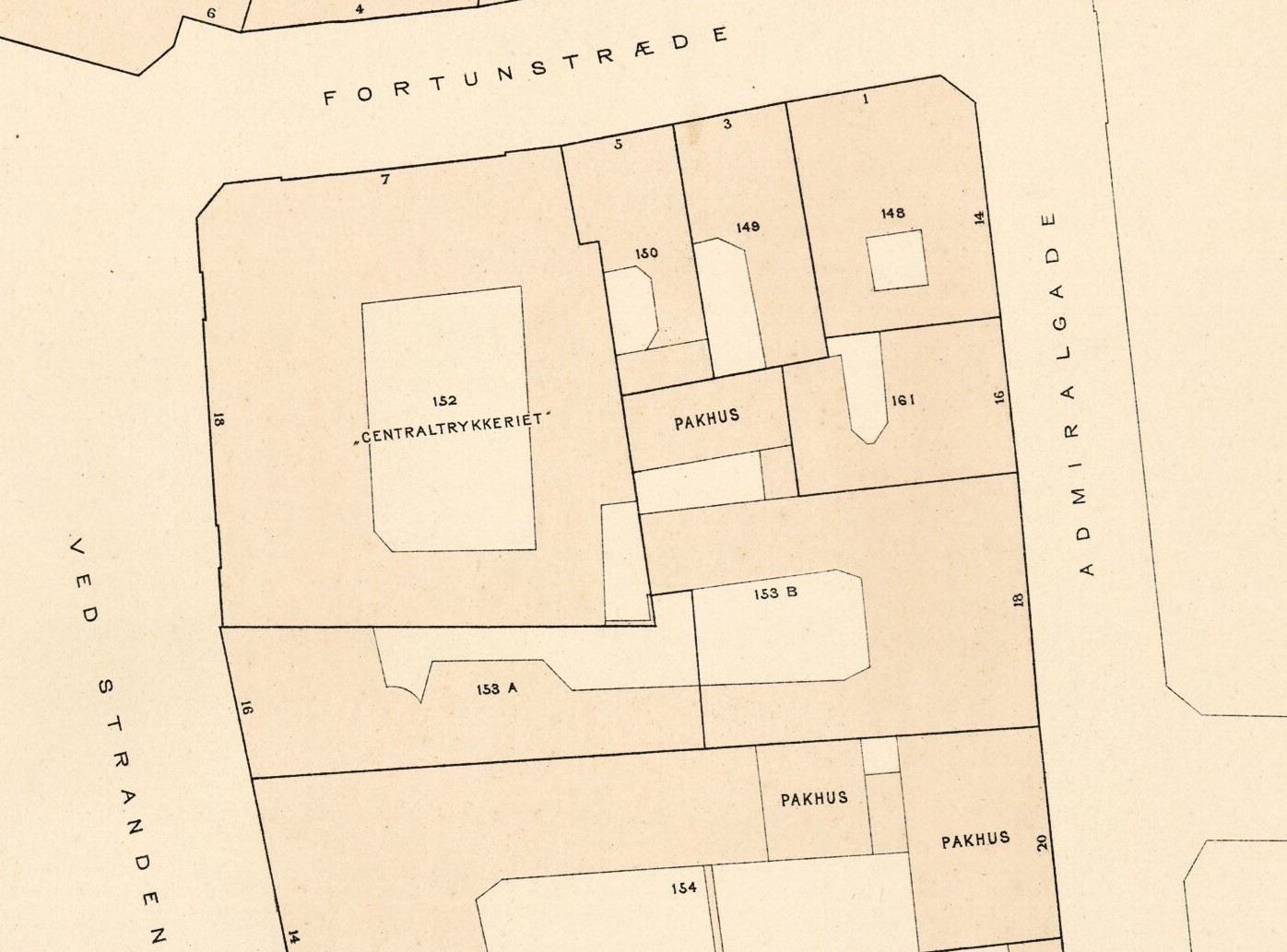
The layout of the property (right) seen on a detail from one of Berggreen's block plans of East Quarter, 1886-88.

The building was initially listed as Admiralgade 18 when house numbering by street was introduced in 1859 as a supplement to the old cadastral numbers by quarter. In 1894 it was changed to Admiralgade 22.

The building was home to 43 residents in seven households at the 1860 census. Joseph Jeremias Israel, a former glazier from Hillerød, resided in the building with his wife Rosa Israel (née Frøsmkel), their four children (aged seven to 17), two widows, an unmarried woman and a maid. C. A. Birch, a schoolmistress, lived in the building with her sister Agnete S Birch, five female teachers, a 14-year-old lodger, one male servant and two maids. Elias Christian Carl Tukon and his wife Fanny Tukon and 42-year-old Martine Lovise Kirstine Svendsen. Robert Schrøder, a businessman (forretningsfører), lived in the building with his wife Karen Agnes Valborg Schrøder, their one-year-old son, two lodgers and one maid. Robert Schrøder, a widow who supplemented her pension with the income from having lodgers, resided in the building with ger 17-year-old daughter Tommie Gorgine Hansen, six lodgers and one maid. Poul Julius Holst, a craftsman, resided in the building with his wife Marie Elisabeth Holst. Carl Wilhelm Olsen, a 26-year-old man, resided in the building on his own.

=== 1885 census ===
The building was home to 43 people at the 1884 census. Magdalene Marie Busk, a schoolmistress, lived on the first and second floors to the left with two widows, a female school teacher, a maid and a lodger.

=== 20th and 21st centuries ===
In the 2000s, Admiralgade belonged to the property investor Poul Kjærgaard Balle-Petersen. He also owned the Niels Aagesen House in Amaliegade.

== Architecture ==
Admiralgade 22 is constructed with four storeys over a walk-out basement. The plastered seven-bays-wide facade is finished with shadow joints on the ground floor, cornice bands below the first- and second-floor windows and a cornice below the roof. The windows of the central and two outer bays have framing painted in the same pinkish colour as Neksø sandstone. The central first-floor window is furthermore topped by a hood mould. A green-painted gate in the central opens to a cobbled courtyard. Two side wings, both of which are integrated with the main wing via a canted corner bay, extends from the rear side of the building along each of their side of the courtyard. The rear side of the building facing the courtyard) is rendered with iron vitriol yellow mortar. The roof has five dormer windows facing the street and four dormer windows facing the yard.

== Today ==
The building contains office space on the ground floor and in the basement and two condominiums on each of the three upper floors. The apartments to the right of the central staircase are slightly larger than those to the left since the one-bay room above the gate belongs to them.
