= P. S. Rung-Keller =

Danish organist and composer (1879-1966)

Paul Sophus Christian Henrik Rung-Keller or P. S. Rung-Keller (11 March 1879 – 22 March 1966) was a Danish organist and composer.

== Biography ==
He was the son of lawyer Emil Keller and operatic soprano Sophie Keller; grandson of composer Henrik Rung. He trained from 1907 at Hornemans Konservatorium operated by C. F. E. Horneman and at the Royal Danish Academy of Music from 1917. He was a student of organist Thomas Laub (1852–1927).

He was employed as organist and cantor at the Church of Our Saviour (Danish: Vor Frelsers Kirke) from 1903 to 1949. He was conductor of Cecilia Association (Caeciliaforening) of Copenhagen from 1912 to 1934, a post he took over after his uncle, composer Frederik Rung.

== See also ==
- List of Danish composers
- Free scores by P. S. Rung-Keller at the International Music Score Library Project (IMSLP)
