= Frederik Rung =

Danish conductor and composer (1854–1914)

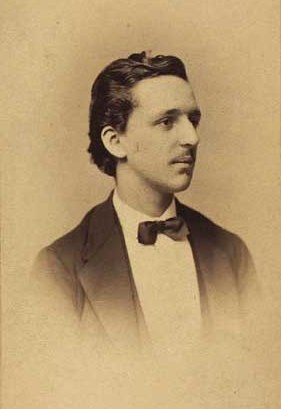
Frederik Rung

Frederik Rung (June 14, 1854 - January 22, 1914) was a Danish conductor and composer.

== Biography ==
He was the son of composer Henrik Rung (1807–1871). His sister Sophie Keller (1850–1929) was an opera singer at the Royal Danish Theatre. His son P. S. Rung-Keller (1879–1966) was also an organist and composer.

He studied 1867–70 at the Royal Danish Academy of Music under Johan Peter Emilius Hartmann and Niels Gade. from 1881 to 1893, he was a piano teacher at the Conservatory of Music. In 1877, he became conductor of the special Madrigal choir at the Cecilia Association (Caeciliaforening) of Copenhagen. From 1884 until his death in 1914, he was a conductor of the Royal Danish Orchestra.

== Works, editions and recordings ==
- Songs and guitar pieces on Roser og Kjerlighed: Inspired by Norway with songs by his father Henrik Rung. Singers Helene Wold, Per Andreas Tønder, Vegard Lund guitar, piano Eugene Asti. Lawo 2011.
- Fogli d'album, performed by Alberto La Rocca (10-string guitar), CD GuitArt 10/2015. Contains 10 pieces from Albumsblade: La melanconia; Praeludium; Dans; Berceuse; Humoreske; Romance; Gavotte; Idyl; Capriccio; Pastorale.

== See also ==
- List of Danish composers
