= Højskolesangbogen =

Danish songbook established in 1894

The recording at Det Kongelige Bibliotek released on Dacapo Records in 2006

Højskolesangbogen of the Danish adult Folk high schools is a songbook established by Heinrich von Nutzhorn in 1894 and substantially revised into a 1922 standard edition.

Twelve of the songs were selected as part of the Danish Culture Canon and freshly recorded under the auspices of Det Kongelige Bibliotek in 2006 by soprano Signe Asmussen, tenor David Danholt and pianist Ulrich Stærk, released as Fra Højskolesangbogen on the government-funded Dacapo Records label.

== Content ==
=== Morning (Morgen) ===
- 1. Den signede dag
- 2. Den mørke nat forgangen er
- 3. Nu rinder solen op
- 4. Vågn op og slå på dine strenge
- 5. Morgenhanen atter gol
- 6. Morgenstund har guld i mund
- 7. Nu ringer alle klokker mod sky
- 8. Lysets engel går med glans
- 9. Nu vågne alle Guds fugle små
- 10. I østen stiger solen op
- 11. Gud ske tak og lov
- 12. Nu titte til hinanden
- 13. Se, nu stiger solen af havets skød
- 14. Begynd daen med en sang
- 15. Nu drejer vort land sig mod solen
- 16. Som sol der rammer klodernes gang
- 17. Svantes lykkelige dag
- 18. Morning has broken
- 19. Morgenens grålys
- 20. Nu blitzer edderkoppespind i graner
- 21. Vi ser det i de klare nætters himmel
- 22. Denne morgens mulighed
- 23. Solen begynder at gløde
- 24. Godmorgen lille land
- 25. Morgen, lys af muligheder
- 26. Lyset er vendt
- 27. Så kom den lyse morgen
- 28. Lyset springer pluds'lig ud
- 29. Når det spirer som i dag
- 30. Daggryet lister sig frem over himlen
- 31. Lyset vælder ind i verden

=== Faith (Tro) ===
- 32. Aleneste Gud i Himmerig
- 33. Nu fryde sig hver kristen mand
- 34. Vor Gud han er så fast en borg
- 35. Nu takker alle Gud
- 36. Befal du dine veje
- 37. Herre Gud! Dit dyre navn og ære
- 38. Om alle mine lemmer
- 39. Op, al den ting, som Gud har gjort
- 40. Her vil ties, her vil bies
- 41. Hvad vindes på verdens vidtløftige hav
- 42. Jeg kender et land
- 43. Himlene, Herre, fortælle din ære
- 44. Giv mig, Gud, en salmetunge
- 45. Kirken den er et gammelt hus
- 46. At sige verden ret farvel
- 47. Kirkeklokken
- 48. Min Jesus, lad mit hjerte få
- 49. Sov sødt, barnlille
- 50. Alt, hvad som fuglevinger fik
- 51. O kristelighed
- 52. Vi kan føle, vi skal lære
- 53. Alle mine kilder skal være hos dig
- 54. Lille Guds barn, hvad skader dig?
- 55. Til himlene rækker din miskundhed, Gud
- 56. Dejlig er jorden
- 57. Amazing Grace
- 58. Nåden er din dagligdag
- 59. Du, som gir os liv og gør os glade
- 60. Du satte dig selv i de nederstes sted
- 61. Menneske, din egen magt
- 62. Uberørt af byens travlhed
- 63. Spænd over os dit himmelsejl
- 64. Du kom til vor runde jord
- 65. Usynlige
- 66. Blinkende dråber fra træernes grene
- 67. Troen er ikke en klippe
- 68. Vi trækker streger
- 69. Du skal elske din næste som dig selv
- 70. Grøn salme
- 71. Et hus at komme til
- 72. Du lagde livstid i min krop
- 73. Når vintermørket blæser sorg og længsel ind
- 74. Min nåde er dig nok
- 75. Og Gud sang

=== Life (Liv) ===
- 76. Sorrig og glæde de vandre til hobe
- 77. Tit er jeg glad
- 78. Hulde engel, du min barndoms ven
- 79. Udrundne er de gamle dage
- 80. Menneske først og kristen så
- 81. Nu skal det åbenbares
- 82. Er lyset for de lærde blot
- 83. Folkeligt skal alt nu være
- 84. Hvad solskin er for det sorte muld
- 85. Ingen har guldtårer fældet
- 86. Menneskelivet er underligt
- 87. Et jævnt og muntert, virksomt liv på jord
- 88. Jeg elsker den brogede verden
- 89. På det jævne, på det jævne
- 90. Gøglervise
- 91. Jens Vejmand
- 92. Lirekassen
- 93. Jeg ved en lærkerede
- 94. En strimma hav
- 95. En sømand har sin enegang
- 96. De små børns smil
- 97. Storbyens ensomhed
- 98. Sangen om Larsen
- 99. Ud ad landevej'n der sku' man gå
- 100. Manden på risten
- 101. Byens lys
- 102. I dit korte liv
- 103. Solen står stille i Gibeons dal
- 104. Du skal plante et træ
- 105. Så länge skutan kan gå
- 106. Barndommens gade
- 107. Gå stille og tyst
- 108. Vi, der valgte regnen
- 109. Være-digtet
- 110. Et mannakorn
- 111. Du ska få en dag i mårå
- 112. Har du visor, min vän
- 113. Let it be
- 114. Life on Mars
- 115. Noget om kraft
- 116. Et samfund kan være så stenet
- 117. Mens jorden driver roligt rundt
- 118. Vi har kun én sol
- 119. Duerne flyver af og til op
- 120. Raindrops Keep Fallin' on My Head
- 121. Both Sides Now
- 122. What a Wonderful World
- 123. Perfect Day
- 124. For livet, ikke for skolen
- 125. Jeg ejer både mark og eng
- 126. Tænk, at livet koster livet
- 127. Når jeg bli'r gammel
- 128. Mørkets sang
- 129. Barndommens land
- 130. Udsigt i kikkert
- 131. Svantes sorte vise
- 132. Svantes Svanesang
- 133. Langebro
- 134. Masser af succes
- 135. Om lidt bli'r her stille
- 136. Papirsklip
- 137. De smukke unge mennesker
- 138. Moder Jord
- 139. Den lige vej
- 140. Kys det nu, det satans liv
- 141. Åbent landskab
- 142. Livstræet
- 143. Hvad er vel livet uden musik
- 144. Jâ va lidinj horra
- 145. Those Who Were
- 146. I've Seen it All
- 147. Linedanser
- 148. Sat her i forvirringstiden
- 149. Nu regner det så stille
- 150. Tænd et lys for mig
- 151. Vår beste dag
- 152. Dåser rasler i morgengry
- 153. Eg ser
- 154. I'm a photographer
- 155. Mirakelnatten
- 156. Har du fyr
- 157. Vi henter tidevandet ind
- 158. Vidunderligt tænkt
- 159. Undertiden
- 160. Hvad tænker Ingrid på
- 161. Natskygge
- 162. Som en hvisken gennem kornet
- 163. Har døden taget noget fra dig, så giv det tilbage
- 164. Ramadan I København
- 165. At dø er at rejse
- 166. Der findes en livstid for alting på jorden
- 167. For vist vil de komme
- 168 Kaos i min hjerne
- 169. Afmagtssang
- 170. Solhverv
- 171. Blomsterkransebrud

=== Sorrow and spiritual (Sprog og ånd) ===
- 172. Moders navn er en himmelsk lyd
- 173. Jeg gik mig ud en sommerdag
- 174. Velkommen i den grønne lund
- 175. Vort modersmål er dejligt
- 176. Sangen har lysning
- 177. Derfor kan vort øje glædes
- 178. Mi nååbo, Pe Sme
- 179. Den danske sang er en ung blond pige
- 180. Sproget
- 181. At lære er at ville befri sin ensomhed
- 182. Der truer os i tiden
- 183. Egetræet tungt af alder
- 184. Jeg ser de lette skyer
- 185. Julies sprog
- 186. I hjerterne begynder
- 187. De ord, jeg synger
- 188. Jeg lærte som lille, at tonerne gror
- 189. Billeder af brand og mord
- 190. Hvad findes der mee

=== Freedom and Community (Frihed og fællesskab) ===
- 191. Frihed er det bedste guld
- 192. Freude, schöner Götterfunken
- 193. Skuld gammel venskab rejn forgo
- 194. Auld Lang Syne
- 195. At samles, skilles ad
- 196. Die Gedanken sind frei!
- 197. Folket er endnu forblindet
- 198. Over de høje fjelde
- 199. Den trænger ud til hvert et sted
- 200. Ole sad på en knold og sang
- 201. Kringsatt av fiender
- 202. Noget om helte
- 203. Noget om billigrejser
- 204. Ulandsvise
- 205. In My Life
- 206. With a Little Help from My Friends
- 207. Imagine
- 208. Så dyrker de korn på et alter i Chile
- 209. Giv dem himlen tilbage
- 210. Sång til friheten
- 211. Der findes en frihed
- 212. Danskerne findes i mange modeller
- 213. At kende sig selv
- 214. You've Got a Friend
- 215. Hvor du sætter din fod
- 216. Jeg drømmer så tit om et sted
- 217. En sång til modet
- 218. Gi' os lyset tilbage
- 219. Syv kjoler for synligheden
- 220. Frit land
- 221. Er de rsteder hvor sandheden synger
- 222. Åbent hjerte
- 223. I mit grænseland
- 224. De unges sang
- 225. Dommen er faldet, ingen appel
- 226. Frihedens lysdøgn

=== Seasonal; Advent (Året - Advent) ===
- 227. Vær velkommen, herrens år (advent)
- 228. Skyerne gråne, og løvet falder
- 229. Det første lys er Ordet, talt af Gud
- 230. Gør døren høj, gør porten vid
- 231. Blomstre som en rosengård
- 232. Der er noget i luften
- 233. Hold håbet op
- 234. December: årets endeligt

=== Seasonal: Christmas (Året - Jul) ===
- 235. Lovet være du, Jesus Krist
- 236. En rose så jeg skyde
- 237. Hjerte, løft din glædes vinger
- 238. I denne søde juletid
- 239. Den yndigste rose er funden
- 240. Mit hjerte altid vanker
- 241. Det kimer nu til julefest
- 242. Et barn er født i Betlehem
- 243. Velkommen igen, Guds engle små
- 244. Lad det klinge sødt i sky
- 245. Julen har englelyd
- 246. Kimer, I klokker!
- 247. Barn Jesus i en krybbe lå
- 248. Julen har bragt velsignet bud
- 249. Glade jul
- 250. Stille Nacht, heilige Nacht
- 251. Silent Night, Holy Night
- 252. O Come, All Ye Faithful
- 253. Hark! The Herald Angels Sing
- 254. Away in a Manger
- 255. Nu tændes tusind julelys
- 256. En stjerne skinner i natt
- 257. Happy Xmas (War Is Over)
- 258. Lille Messias
- 259. Juletræet med sin pynt
- 260. Højt fra træets grønne top
- 261. Decembernat

=== Seasonal: New Year (Året - Nytår) ===
- 262. Solhvervssang
- 263. Vær velkommen, herrens år (nytår)
- 264. Dejlig er den himmel blå

=== Seasonal: Winter (Året - Vinter) ===
- 265. Som året går
- 266. Januar puster sin rastløse vilje
- 267. Januar har sne på huen
- 268. Sneen dækker mark og mose
- 269. I sne står urt og busk i skjul
- 270. Det er hvidt herude
- 271. Der er ingenting i verden så stille som sne
- 272. Sneflokke kommer vrimlende
- 273. Spurven sidder stum bag kvist
- 274. Den nye sne
- 275. Tidlig vår
- 276. Guds nåde er en vintergæk
- 277. Februar
- 278. Det lyser koldt i februar
- 279. Kom, maj, du søde, milde!
- 280. Liden sol i disse uger

=== Seasonal - Early Spring (Året - Tidligt forår) ===
- 281. Den blå anemone
- 282. Lysfyldt morgen, til marven kold
- 283. Frydeligt med jubelkor
- 284. Den kedsom vinter gik sin gang
- 285. Når vinteren rinder i grøft og i grav
- 286. Som de første forårsdage
- 287. Det er i dag et vejr - et solskinsvejr
- 288. Velkommen, lærkelil!
- 289. Det er lærkernes tid
- 290. Nu hælder Europa mod sol igen
- 291. Bedstefar, tag dine tænder på
- 292. Luk døren op og se
- 293. Forårssang uden håb
- 294. Sommerfuglen
- 295. Den gamle skærslippers forårssang
- 296. Verden er våd og lys

=== Seasonal: Easter (Året - Påske) ===
- 297. Påskemorgen
- 298. Som den gyldne sol frembryder
- 299. Påskeblomst! hvad vil du her
- 300. Tag det sorte kors fra graven
- 301. Hil dig, frelser og forsoner
- 302. Krist stod op af døde
- 303. Som forårssolen morgenrød
- 304. Hold da op! Hvad sker der her

=== Seasonal: Late Spring (Året - Sent forår) ===
- 305. Jeg vælger mig april
- 306. Hej april
- 307. Forårsdag
- 308. Hilsen til forårssolen
- 309. Det er så køhnt, det er så dejle
- 310. Grøn er vårens hæk
- 311. Den grønne søde vår
- 312. Opvåvni
- 313. Han kommer med sommer
- 314. Storken sidder på bondens tag
- 315. Å, så let er dit fodtrin
- 316. Det dirrer i luften af dråbestøv
- 317. Vårvise
- 318. Når æbletræets hvide gren
- 319. Idas sommarvisa
- 320. Se, det summer af sol over engen
- 321. Lyse nætter

=== Seasonal: Pentacost [sic?] (Året - Pinse) ===
- 322. Nu bede vi den Helligånd
- 323. I al sin glans nu stråler solen
- 324. Gak ud, min sjæl, betragt med flid

=== Seasonal: Early Summer (Året - Tidlig sommer) ===
- 325. Sommersalme
- 326. Nu blomstertiden kommer
- 327. Når egene knoppes
- 328. Nu lyser løv i lunde
- 329. Fyldt med blomster blusser
- 330. Dagvise
- 331. Hvor skoven dog er frisk og stor
- 332. I skyggen vi vanke
- 333. Danmark nu blunder den lyse nat
- 334. Lige før timerne mørkner i juni

=== Seasonal: Midsymmer (Året - Midsommer) ===
- 335. Midsommervise
- 336. Sommersolhvervssang
- 337. Døber, sanger, knægte, flammer

=== Seasonal: High Summer (Året - Højsommer) ===
- 338. Herligt, en sommernat
- 339. Du danske sommer jeg elsker dig
- 340. Tordenbygen
- 341. Sommersang uden sol
- 342. Se dig ud en sommerdag
- 343. Jeg er havren. Jeg har bjælder på
- 344. Vi skal ikkje sova bort sumarnatta
- 345. Den lyse nat
- 346. Nu er dagen fuld af sang
- 347. Sommerens ø

=== Seasonal: Late Summer (Året - Sensommer) ===
- 348. Vipper springe
- 349. En stille, høstlig brusen
- 350. Marken er mejet, og høet er høstet
- 351. Nu er det længe siden
- 352. Det lysner over agres felt
- 353. Sensommervise
- 354. Vägen hem var mycket lång
- 355. Septembers himmel er så blå
- 356. Sæsonen er slut

=== Seasonal: Early Autumn (Året - Tidligt efterår) ===
- 357. Vi pløjed, og vi så'de
- 358. Du gav mig, o Herre, en lod af din jord
- 359. Nu falmer skoven trindt om land
- 360. Du bakkebløde bondeland
- 361. Efterårsblæst
- 362. Det løvfald, som vi kom så alt for nær
- 363. Oktoberdagens skiften
- 364. Oktoberdag i flammer

=== Seasonal: All Saints' (Året - Allehelgen) ===
- 365. Den store hvide flok vi se
- 366. De sniger sig så hemmligt afsted
- 367. Dagen bliver så kort ved Allehelgen

=== Seasonal; Late Autumn (Året - Sent efterår) ===
- 368. Regnvejrsdag i november
- 369. Efterår
- 370. Den sorte fugl er kommet
- 371. Mørk er november
- 372. Fra vest står blæsten
- 373. November går tungt gennem byen
- 374. November igen
- 375. Dybt hælder året i sin gang

=== Denmark (Danmark) ===
- 376. Der er et yndigt land
- 377. Underlige aftenlufte
- 378. Kær est du, fødeland
- 379. Rosen blusser alt i Danas have
- 380. Langt højere bjerge så vide på jord
- 381. Kærlighed til fædrelandet
- 382. Fædreneland!
- 383. Danmarks Engel
- 384. I Danmark er jeg født
- 385. Hist, hvor vejen slår en bugt
- 386. Jylland mellem tvende have
- 387. Jyden han æ stærk å sej
- 388. Jeg ved hvor der findes en have så skøn
- 389. Jeg elsker de grønne lunde
- 390. I Synnerjylland, dér er æ føjt
- 391. Venner, ser på Danmarks kort
- 392. Vi sletternes sønner
- 393. Jeg ser de bøgelyse øer
- 394. Der dukker af disen min fædrenejord
- 395. Du kære blide danske bæk
- 396. Havet omkring Danmark
- 397. Som en rejselysten flåde
- 398. Du gav os de blomster, som lyste imod os
- 399. For en fremmed barskt og fattigt
- 400. Hvor smiler fager den danske kyst
- 401. Cykelsangen
- 402. Blæsten går frisk over Limfjordens vande
- 403. Her har hjertet hjemme
- 404. Danmarks dale
- 405. Årstiderne
- 406. Danmark, dit indre ocean
- 407. Dejlighedssang
- 408. Stenen slår smut på det danske vand
- 409. Farvernes landskab
- 410. Danmark
- 411. Gamle Danmark
- 412. Der er et venligt lille land
- 413. Mit land
- 414. Fædrelandet
- 415. Danmarksfilm
- 416. Er Vesterhavet vest nok

=== The Nordic Countries (Norden) ===
- 417. Nordisk Hymne

=== Nordic: Greenland (Norden - Grønland) ===
- 418. Vort ældgamle land
- 419. Nunarput utoqqarsuanngoravit (Vort ældgamle land)
- 420. Et vældigt klippeland
- 421. Nuna Asiilasooq (Et vældigt klippeland)
- 422. Højt over jorden den blånende himmel
- 423. Ung har jeg været
- 424. Som en morgen, når solen står strålende op
- 425. Arnajaraqs vandringssang

=== Nordic: The Faroe Islands (Norden - Færøerne) ===
- 426. O Færø, så fager
- 427. Tú alfagra land mítt (O Færo, så fager)
- 428. Den mindste klump
- 429. Kom nu veninde
- 430. Min blomst

=== Nordic: Iceland (Norden - Island) ===
- 431. Vort hjemlands Gud
- 432. Ó, Guð, vors lands (Vort hjemlands Gud)
- 433. O sommersol, så signefuld!
- 434. Rid nu, rid nu rask hen over sandet

=== Nordic: Norway (Norden - Norge) ===
- 435. Ja, vi elsker dette landet

=== Nordic: Sweden (Norden - Sverige) ===
- 436. Du gamla, du fria
- 437. Gubben Noak
- 438. Fjäriln vingad syns på Haga
- 439. Hvila vid denna källa
- 440. Ack, Värmeland, du sköna

=== Nordic Åland (Norden - Åland) ===
- 441. Ålandsvisen

=== Nordic Finland (Norden - Finland) ===
- 442. Vårt land, vårt land
- 443. Finlandia

=== Love (Kærlighed) ===
- 444. En yndig og frydefuld sommertid
- 445. Greensleeves
- 446. It was a lover and his lass
- 447. Chrysillis, du mit verdens guld
- 448. Jag vet en dejlig rosa
- 449. Vem kan segla förutan vind?
- 450. Uti vår hage där växa blå bär
- 451. Heidenröslein
- 452. Jeg kan se på dine øjne
- 453. Det var en lørdag aften
- 454. Det var en lørdag aften (PH)
- 455. Visa från Utanmyra
- 456. Roselil' og hendes moder
- 457. Hun er sød
- 458. Mads Doss
- 459. Hvad er det, min Marie
- 460. Det er så yndigt at følges ad
- 461. Til en veninde
- 462. Hvis jeg kunne synge
- 463. Landskab
- 464. Den milde dag er lys og lang
- 465. Min pige er så lys som rav
- 466. Den första gång jag såg dig
- 467. Hvorfor er lykken så lunefuld
- 468. Så tag mit hjerte
- 469. Stille nat
- 470. Til en følsom veninde
- 471. Dansevise
- 472. Å, den som var en løvetann
- 473. Veronica, Veronica
- 474. Visen om de atten svaner
- 475. Smuk og dejlig
- 476. Lille sang til Nina
- 477. Aftentur med Rosalina
- 478. Da jeg mødte dig
- 479. Hallelujah
- 480. Forelskelsessang
- 481. Kærlighedssang ved et tab
- 482. Fields of Gold
- 483. Undantag
- 484. Right next to the right one
- 485. Skybrud
- 486. Fortabt er jeg stadig
- 487. De milde vinde en forårsnat

=== Folk songs and ballads (Folkeviser og ballader) ===
- 488. Dronning Dagmars død
- 489. Ebbe Skammelsøn
- 490. Elveskud
- 491. Harpans kraft
- 492. Agnete og Havmanden
- 493. Ramund var sig en bedre mand
- 494. Der stode tre skalke
- 495. Der står en lind i min faders gård
- 496. To søstre
- 497. Stolt Vesselil
- 498. Ravnen
- 499. Bonden og Elverpigen
- 500. Leonoras vise
- 501. Jeg husker det hele, jeg husker ingenting
- 502. Velfærdsdødedansen

=== History (Historien) ===
- 503. Bladet i bogen sig vender
- 504. Du bærer din fortid
- 505. Som dybest brønd gi'r altid klarest vand
- 506. Universet var tavst
- 507. Drømte mig en drøm i nat
- 508. I alle de riger og lande
- 509. På Sjølunds fagre sletter
- 510. Sol er oppe
- 511. Kong Vermund den gamle
- 512. Danmark, dejligst vang og vænge
- 513. Morten Luther
- 514. På Tave bondes ager ved Birkende by
- 515. Skipper Klements morgensang
- 516. Kong Christian stod ved højen mast
- 517. Leonoras morgendigt
- 518. Udrust dig, helt fra Golgata
- 519. Kommer hid, I piger små
- 520. Sig nærmer tiden, da jeg må væk
- 521. Dengang jeg drog afsted
- 522. Her rejses en skole som så mange før
- 523. Det var en sommermorgen
- 525. Du skønne land med dal og bakker fagre
- 526. Hvad synger du om så højt i det blå
- 527. Det, som lysner over vangen
- 528. En vise om andemad
- 529. Det haver så nyligen regnet
- 529. Vi sålde våra hemman
- 530. Waltzing Matilda
- 531. Madeleine
- 532. Det lyder som et eventyr
- 533. Rejs jer, fordømte her på jorden
- 534. Flyv højt, vor sang, på stærke vinger
- 535. Snart dages det, brødre, det lysner i øst
- 536. Jeg bærer med smil min byrde
- 537. Det er os, det er os
- 538. Når jeg ser et rødt flag smælde
- 539. Danmark for folket
- 540. Die Moorsoldaten
- 541. De mørke fugle fløj
- 542. Man binder os på mund og hånd
- 543. DEN TIENDE MUSE
- 544. Det mørkner i vort år
- 545. Men det bli'r atter stille efter stormen
- 546. En lærke letted, og tusind fulgte
- 547. Det kom som en susen ved aften
- 548. Forår over Europa
- 549. Jutlandia
- 550. Where Have All the Flowers Gone?
- 551. We Shall Overcome
- 522. Blowin' in the Wind
- 553. Penny Lane
- 554. I kan ikke slå os ihjel (Christiania)
- 555. Wind of Change
- 556. Fuglene
- 557. Man må trække en grænse
- 558. Hver dag en ny dag

=== Biblical History (elhistorien) ===
- 559. Paradiset
- 560. Abraham sad i Mamre-lund
- 561. Kong Farao var en ugudelig krop
- 562. Jeg gik i marken og vogtede får
- 563. Guldkalven
- 564. Der sad en fisker så tankefuld
- 565. I kvæld blev der banket på helvedes port

=== Evening (Aften) ===
- 566. Nu hviler mark og enge
- 567. Den klare sol går ned
- 568. Sig månen langsomt hæver
- 569. Der Mond ist aufgegangen
- 570. Nu er jord og himmel stille
- 571. Natten er så stille
- 572. Der står et slot i vesterled
- 573. Dagen går med raske fjed
- 574. Bliv hos os, når dagen hælder
- 575. Fred hviler over land og by
- 576. Kølig det lufter i måneskin mat
- 577. Altid frejdig, når du går
- 578. Wiegenlied
- 579. Tunge, mørke natteskyer
- 580. Jeronimus' sang
- 581. Sænk kun dit hoved, du blomst
- 582. Stille, hjerte, sol går ned
- 583. Sov, min egen, sov, lille nor
- 584. Byssan lull
- 585. Solen er så rød, mor
- 586. Forårsnat
- 587. Herre min Gud, vad den månen lyser
- 588. Sov på min arm
- 589. Noget om en dejlig nat
- 590. Nu går solen sin vej
- 591. Du, som har tændt millioner af stjerner
- 592. Go' nu nat
- 593. Et hav, der vugger sig til ro
- 594. Ró
- 595. Sov nu sødt
- 596. De blå og grønne nætter
- 597. Nirvana
- 598. Så, min sol, gå bare ned
- 599. Dagen slipper grebet
- 600. Aftenbøn
- 601. I skovens dybe stille ro
