= Adolph Stramboe =

Danish ballet dancer

Johan Adolph Frederik Stramboe (28 August 1801 – 25 July 1850) was a Danish ballet dancer.

== Early life ==
Stramboe was born in Copenhagen, the son of glovemaker Johannes Stramboe (1768–1841) and Ane Christine Gunkel (c. 1776–1826). After his mother's death in 1828, his father married Cathrine Bothilda Svenson.

== Career ==
Stramboe was trained as a ballet dancer under Vincenzo Galeotti at the Royal Danish Ballet. In 1833, he was employed by the ballet. He was most successful in comic roles in some of August Bournonville's ballets.

In February 1850, Stramboe had to discontinue his career due to mental illness.

== Personal life ==
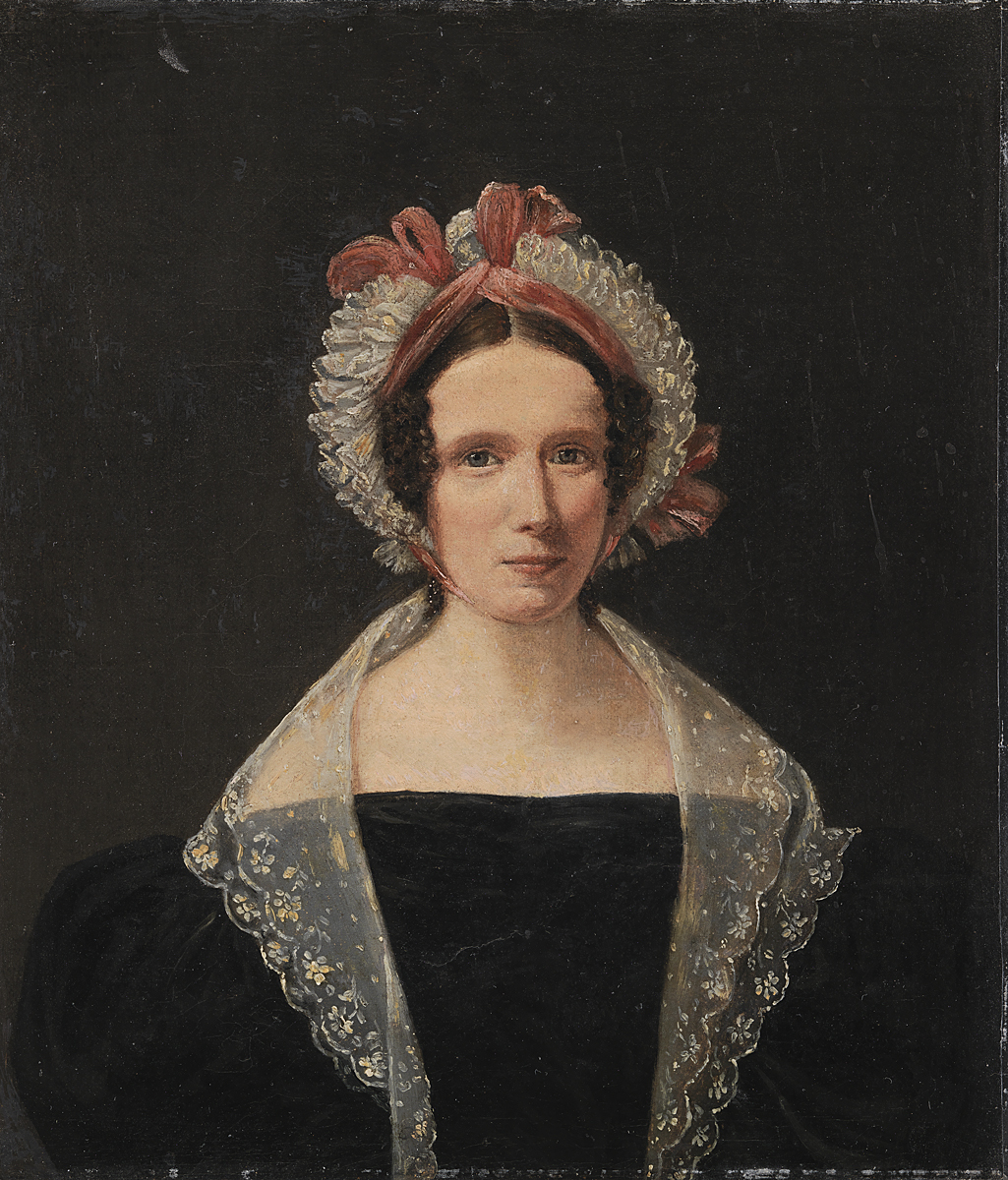
Sophie Stramboe painted by David Monies

On 27 March 1824 Stramboe married actress at the Royal Danish Theatre Sophie Frederikke Svanemann (1803–1865), daughter of joiner Lorentz Svanemann (c. 1767–1811) and Mette Marie Larsen.

Their son Edvard Julius Lorentz Stramboe (20 December 1825 – 27 October 1895) and daughter Laura Stillmann (married to the architect Johan Andreas Stillmann) would also become ballet dancers.

At the time of the 1850 census (1 February) Stramboe and his wife resided with their three daughters in an apartment at Admiralgade 22. He was shortly thereafter hospitalized at Sankt Hans Hospital after being stricken by mental illness. He died just a few months later. He is buried at Holmens Cemetery. His wife later married soldier Casper Olsen.
