= Danmark, mit fædreland =

Song by Hans Christian Andersen

Danmark, mit Fædreland (English: Denmark, my Fatherland), also known by its first line as I Danmark er jeg født (English: In Denmark Am I Born), is an 1850 song by Hans Christian Andersen, frequently proposed as a new Danish national anthem instead of Der er et yndigt land, It has been included in the Folk High School Song Book since 1922, initially accompanied by an 1850 melody by Henrik Rung and now by an alternative melody composed by Poul Schierbeck in 1926. It was included in the 2004 Danish Culture Canon as one of 12 songs from the Folk High School Song Book.

== History ==
Denmark's involvement in the First Schleswig War (1848–50) and the adoption of the Danish constitution (1849) prompted a strong focus on patriotism and national identity.

Andersen's poem Danmark, mit Fædreland was first published on 5 March 1850 in the newspaper Fædrelandet. The first melody for it was composed by Henrik Rung. It was first performed publicly at a fund-raising event arranged by the Scandinavian Society (Skandinavisk Forening), on 8 May 1850 in the Casino Theatre, aimed at raising funds for a monument commemorating the Danish victory in the Battle of Fredericia. Rung served as conductor of the Scandinavian Society's men's choir and the song was performed by the choir as the opening act of the concert. The monument—Herman Wilhelm Bissen's Landsoldaten in Fredericia—was inaugurated in 1858.

In 1926, Poul Schierbeck composed an alternative melody which has later gained more popularity. In 1996, Sebastian composed a third melody for the song. It was created for use in the musical Hans Christian Andersen at Gladsaxe Theatre.

== Publications and recordings ==
The poem is included in Hans Christian Andersen's Complete Works as one of 13 poems in a section entitled called Fædrelandske Digte under Krigen I Danmark er jeg født was first included in Højskolesangbogen in 1922, accompanied by Rung's melody. In the 1928 edition of Højskolesangbogen, it was again accompanied by Rung's melody. In the 1940 and 1958 editions of Højskolesangbogen, it was accompanied both by Rung's and Schierbecks's melodies. In the 1976 and 1993 editions, it was only accompanied by Schierbeck's melody. In the Edition Wilhelm Hansen publication Sangbogen I-II (1988 og 1996), it is accompanied by all three melodies.

== Reception ==
Andersen's poem was enthusiastically received when it was first published. On several occasions, it has been proposed to adopt it as the official national anthem of Denmark instead of Der er et yndigt land.

In 1996, it was included in the Danish Culture Canon as one of 12 songs from Højskolesangbogen.

== Lyrics ==
I Danmark er jeg født, dér har jeg hjemme,
dér har jeg rod, derfra min verden går;
du danske sprog, du er min moders stemme,
så sødt velsignet du mit hjerte når.
Du danske, friske strand,
hvor oldtids kæmpegrave
står mellem æblegård og humlehave.
Dig elsker jeg! - Danmark, mit fædreland!

Hvor reder sommeren vel blomstersengen
mer rigt end her ned til den åbne strand?
Hvor står fuldmånen over kløverengen
så dejligt som i bøgens fædreland?
Du danske, friske strand,
hvor Dannebrogen vajer -
Gud gav os den - Gud giv den bedste sejer! -
Dig elsker jeg! - Danmark, mit fædreland!

Engang du herre var i hele Norden,
bød over England - nu du kaldes svag;
et lille land, og dog så vidt om jorden
end høres danskens sang og mejselslag.
Du danske, friske strand,
plovjernet guldhorn finder -
Gud giv dig fremtid, som han gav dig minder!
Dig elsker jeg! - Danmark, mit fædreland!

Du land, hvor jeg blev født, hvor jeg har hjemme,
hvor jeg har rod, hvorfra min verden går,
hvor sproget er min moders bløde stemme
og som en sød musik mit hjerte når.
Du danske, friske strand,
med vilde svaners rede,
I grønne øer, mit hjertes hjem hernede!
Dig elsker jeg! - Danmark, mit fædreland!
