= Henrik Rung =

Danish composer (1807-1871)

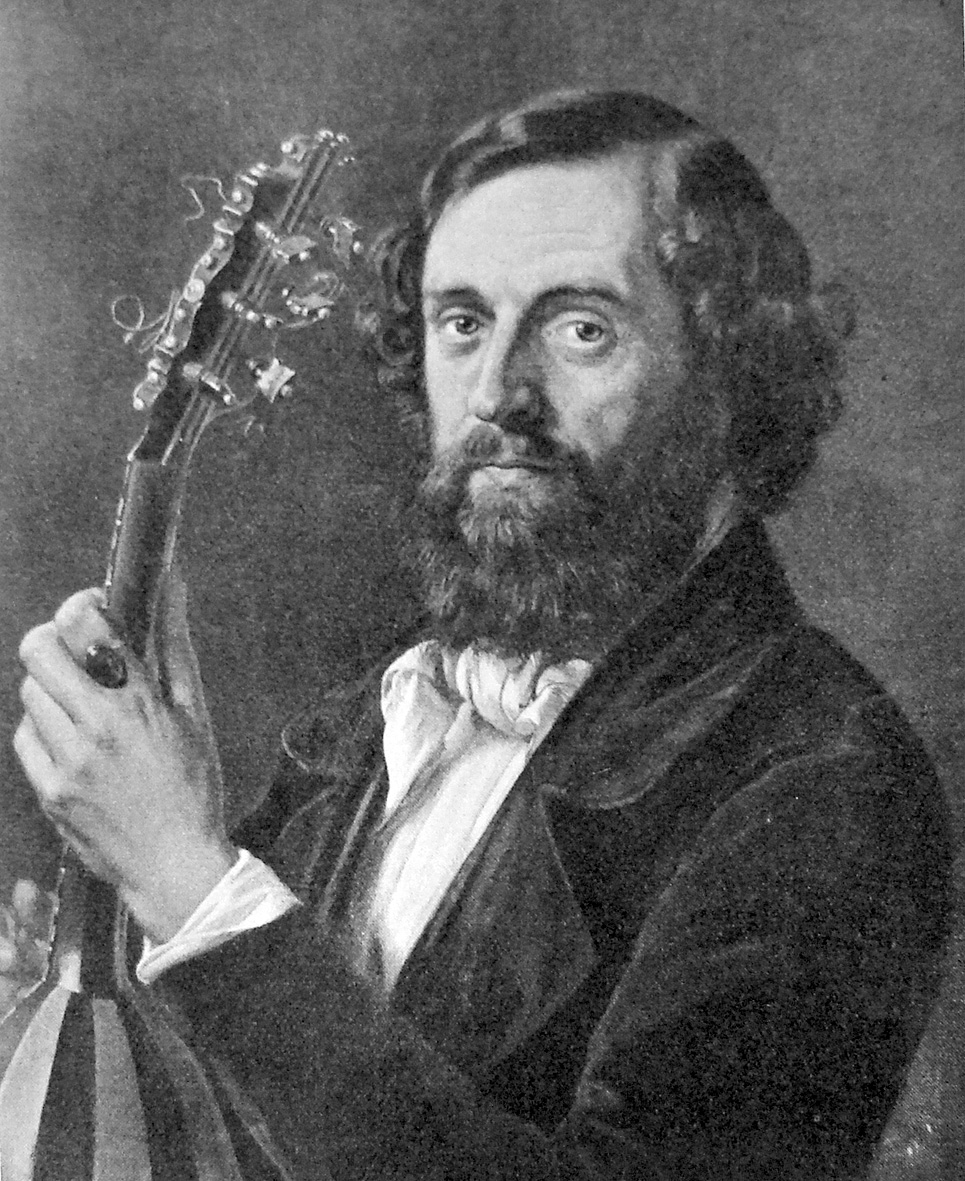
- Born: March 31, 1807; Copenhagen, Denmark
- Died: December 12, 1871 (aged 64); Copenhagen, Denmark
- Resting place: Holmen Cemetery
- Children: Frederik Rung; Sophie Keller; Georg Rung
- Honours: Order of the Dannebrog

Henrik Rung (March 30, 1807 – December 12, 1871) was a Danish composer.

== Early life and education ==
Henrik Rung was born in Copenhagen. Rung received training with the Royal Danish Orchestra in Copenhagen. He received a travel grant to study in Germany, Italy and Paris (1837-1840).

== Career ==
In 1842, Rung became a singing master and held a lifelong position as a director of the opera at the Royal Danish Theatre.

== Personal life ==
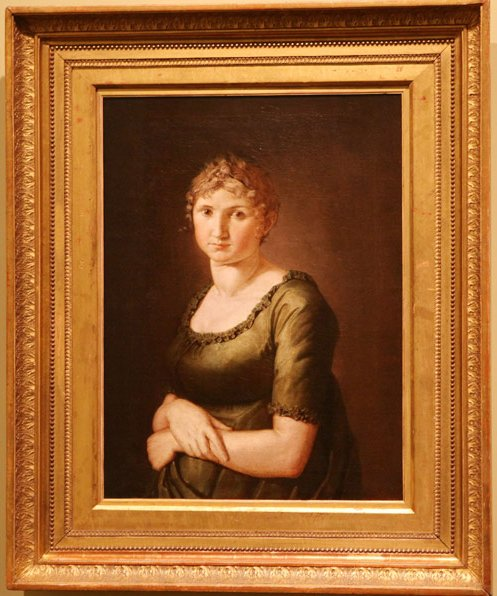
Pauline Rung nee Lichtenstein, painted by Philipp Otto Runge

In 1841 he married the opera singer Pauline Lichtenstein. His son Frederik Rung (1854-1914) was also a composer and his daughter Sophie Keller (1850–1929) was an opera singer at the Royal Danish Theatre.

== Compositions ==
- I Danmark er jeg født (1850)
- Kirkeklokke, ej til Hovedstæder (1853)
- Alt står i Guds faderhånd (1856)

== Recordings ==
- Songs on Roses and Love. Helene Wold (Soprano), Per Andreas Tonder (Baritone), Eugene Asti (Piano), Vegard Lund (Guitar) Lawo 2011
- Waltz Serenade. Mair-Davis Duo, Marilyn Mair, mandolin; Mark Davis, guitar: "Vienna Nocturne" North Star Records, 1991

== Link ==
- Henrik Rung - A Danish Counterpart to Fernando Sor, by Jens Bang-Rasmussen
