= David Monies =

Danish painter

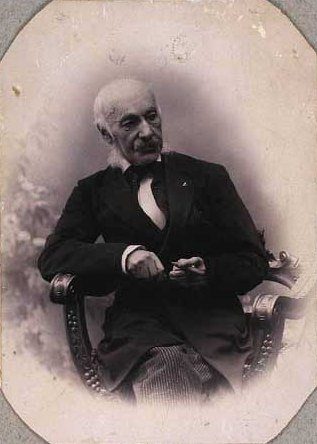
David Monies (date unknown)

David Monies (3 June 1812, Copenhagen - 29 April 1894, Frederiksberg) was a Danish portrait and genre painter.

== Biography ==
His father, Salomon (1786-1853) was a Jewish businessman from the Netherlands. Originally wealthy, the family lost all of its money during the Danish state bankruptcy of 1813 and the children were raised in poverty. He and his brothers were forced to work at their father's small cigar factory and peddle what they made in the street.

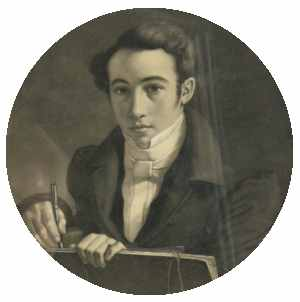
An early self-portrait

However, when he was only twelve, he had already gained access to classes at the Royal Danish Academy of Fine Arts, where he studied with J.L. Lund. He soon began painting and exhibiting portraits. During the early 1830s, he gained many supporters and admirers in the professional and artistic communities, although his female portraits are generally considered to be too conventional and less interesting; possibly related to shyness due to his youth. He also began to do genre paintings at this time. Many featured his fellow artists as part of the ensembles.

He applied for the "Fonden ad usus publicos", an arts and sciences fund created by King Frederick V, but the Academy found his drawing skills deficient; advising him to travel and create sketches that could be developed later. As a result, he was given a small travel stipend. Initially, he went with Wilhelm Marstrand and Louis Gurlitt, but later travelled to Munich by himself. After sending several works back home to the Academy, he was awarded money from the fund. Feeling more secure, in 1837 he married Bolette Jacobsen, the daughter of a local merchant.

In 1847, he became an "Agré" (a type of member candidate) at the Academy and was promoted to full member the following year. He first won larger public notice with his paintings of troops returning from the First Schleswig War. Other historical works fared well, but his attempts to portray the history of the Jewish community were not successful.

In 1859, he was named a "Titular Professor" and, in 1867, was awarded the "Anckerske Rejselegat", a travel scholarship for poets, composers and artists. In 1874, he was appointed Knight of the Order of the Dannebrog. By this time his, eyesight had already declined to the point where painting was difficult. Two years before his death, he received the "Dannebrogordenens Hæderstegn".

== Selected paintings ==
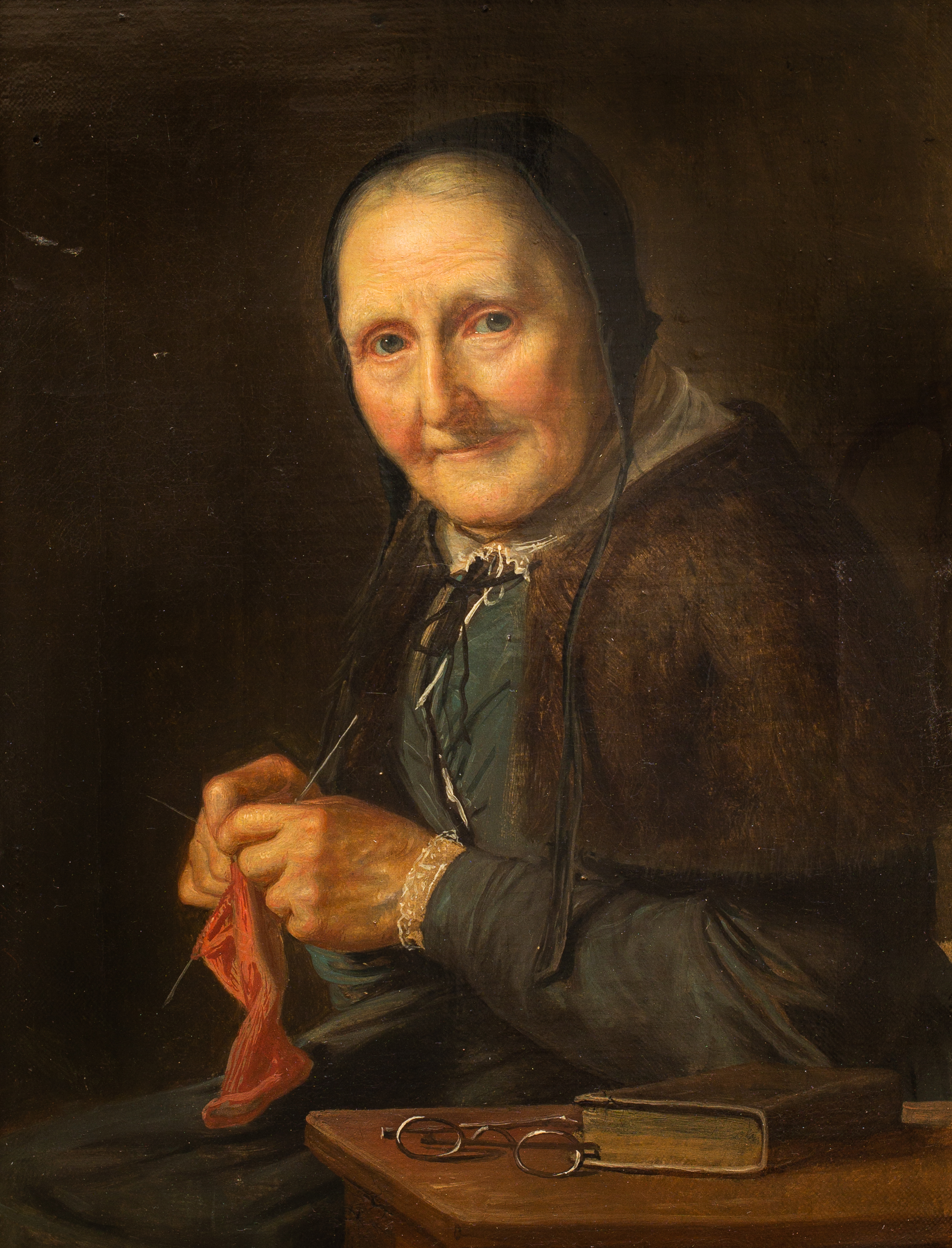
Old Woman Knitting

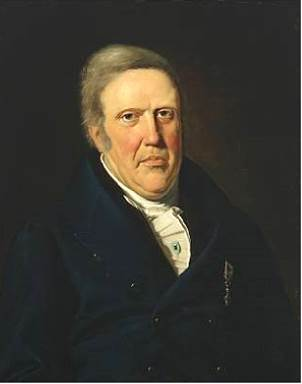
War Commissioner
Johan Rubring Harboe
(1762-1840)

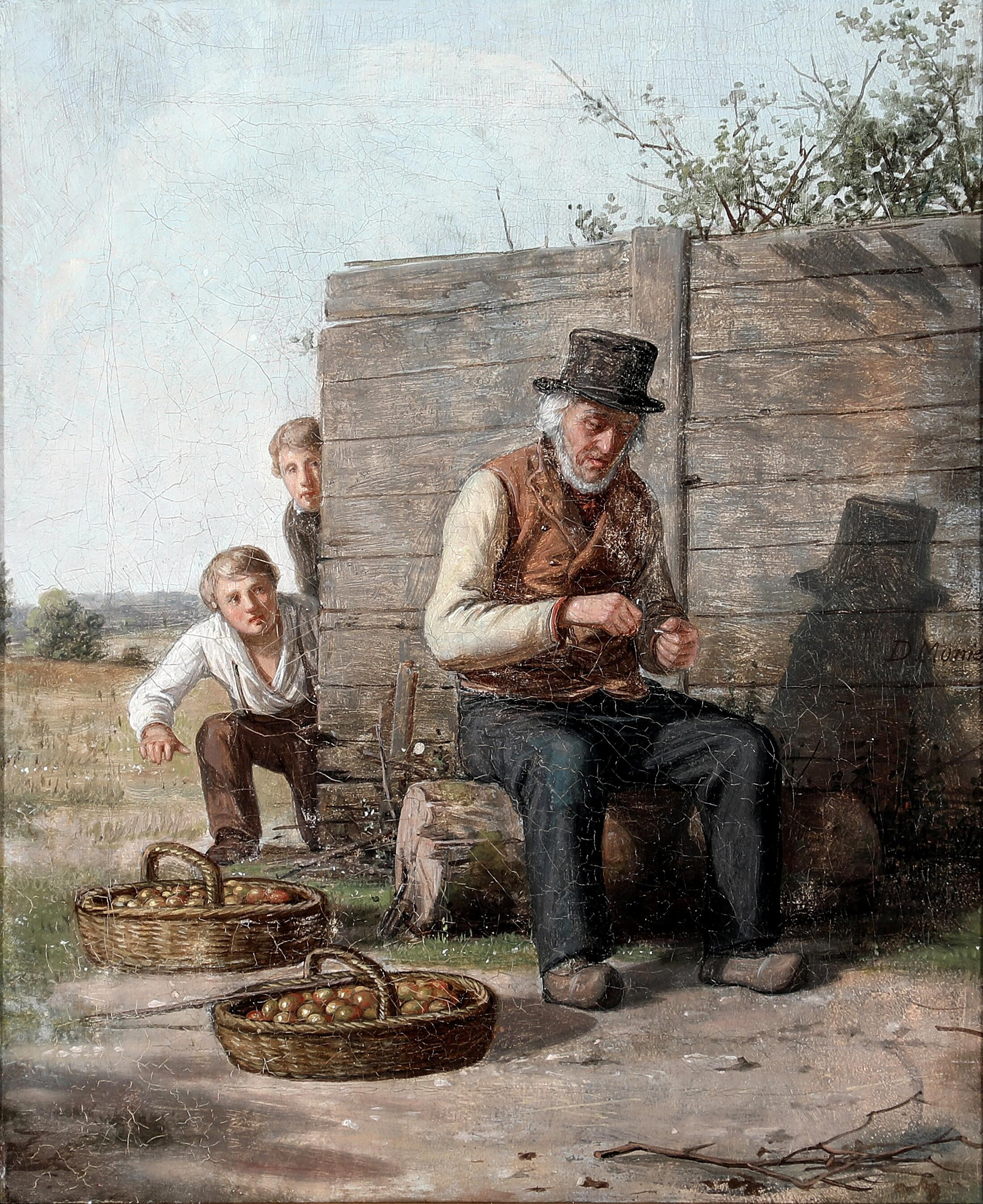
Stealing Apples

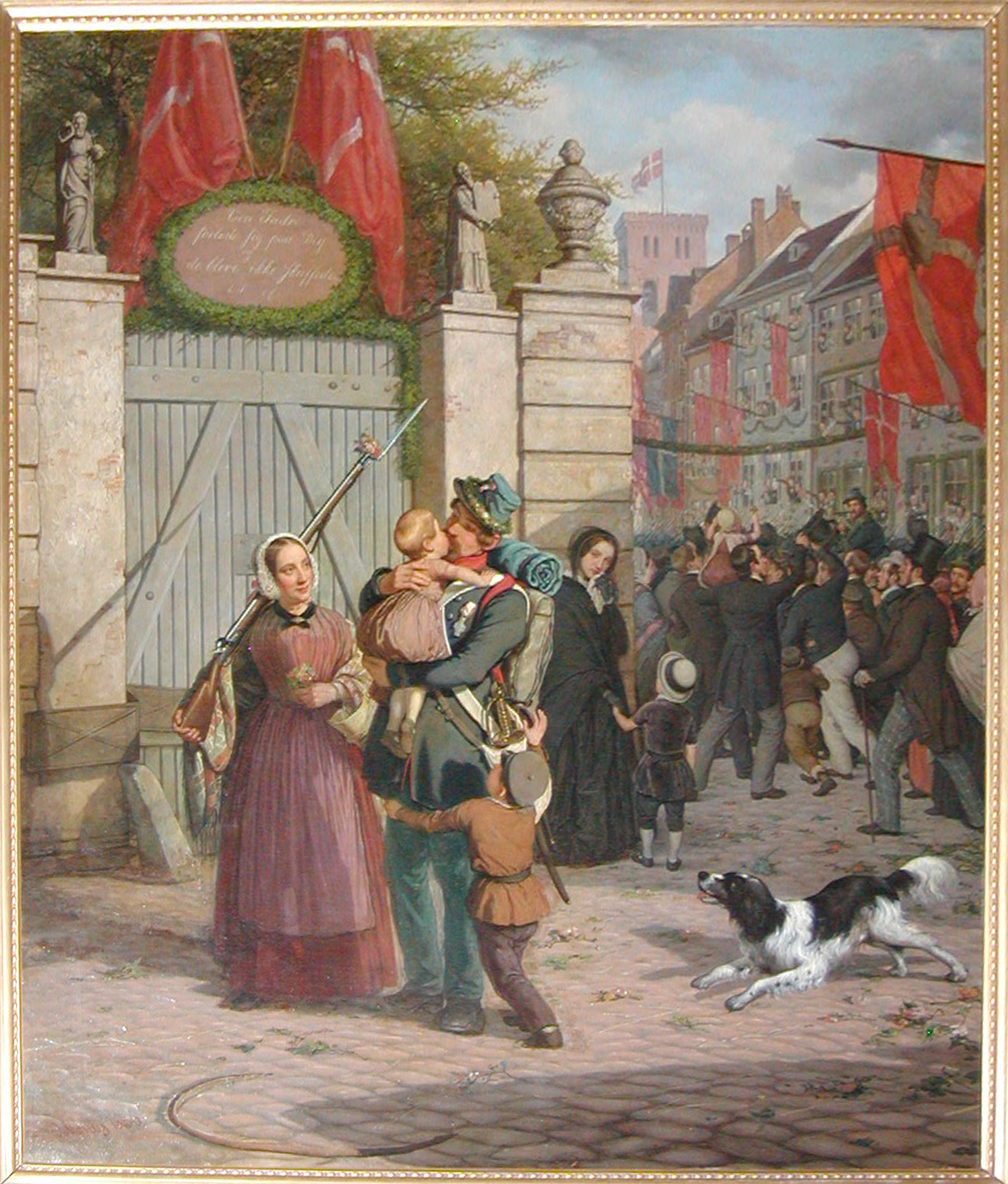
Soldier returning
from the First Schleswig War

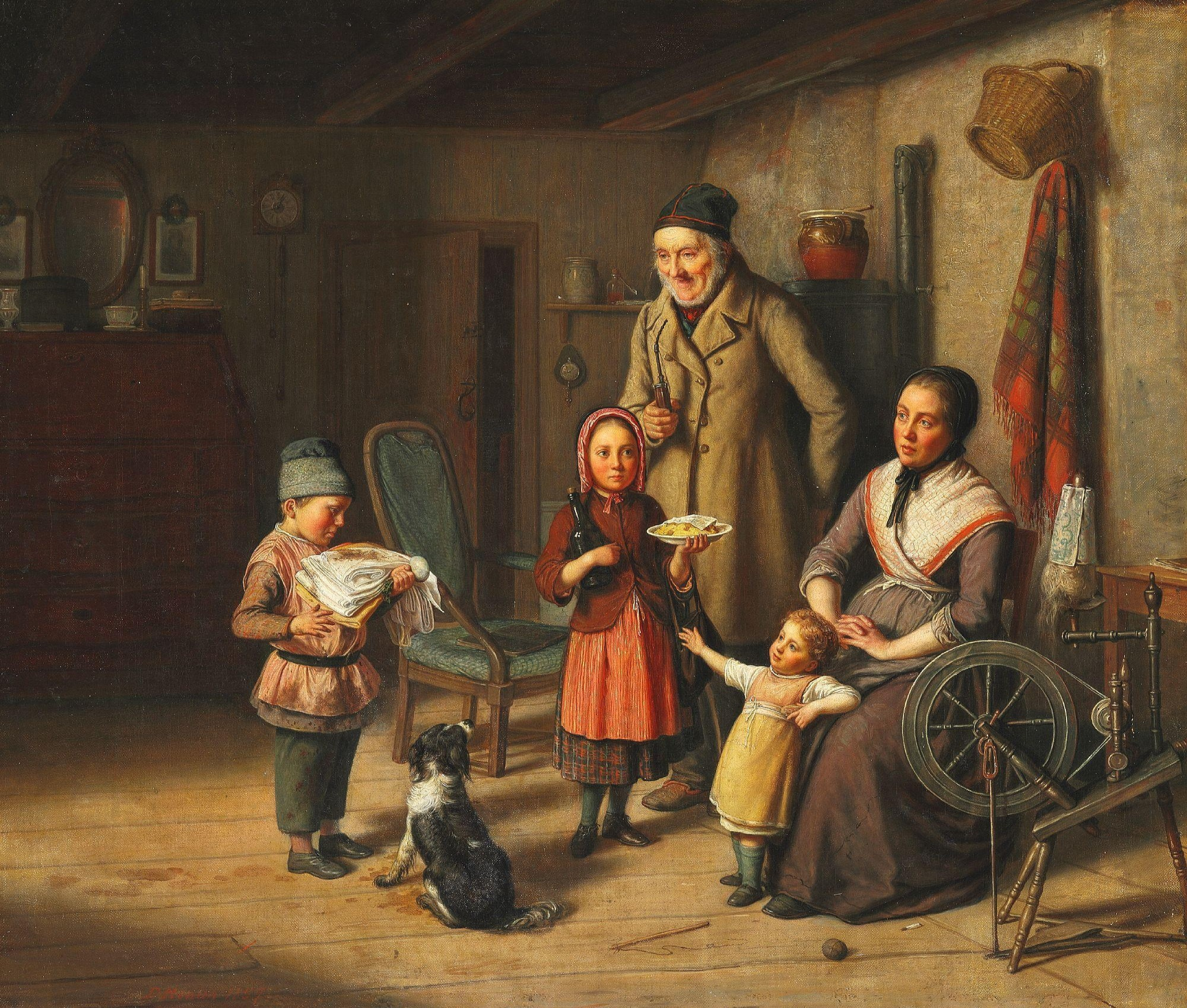
The Dirty Bundle
